= Diocesan Schools Group of Pagadian =

Network of Catholic schools in the Philippines

Diocesan Schools Group of Pagadian (also referred as the Diocesan Schools of Pagadian) is the network of sixteen schools under the administration and control of the Diocese of Pagadian. The schools are governed by the Bishop of Pagadian, Most Rev. Emmanuel T. Cabajar, C.Ss.R, through the Diocesan Schools Superintendent, Rev. Foelan G. Echavez, M.A.

Prior to the takeover in the 1970s under Bishop Jesus B. Tuquib, Holy Child Academy, Star of the Sea High School, Immaculate Heart Academy, and Saint Columban College were run by the Missionary Society of St. Columban.

== Tertiary ==
=== Saint Columban College ===
Columban is the largest among the diocesan schools. Operating in three campuses in Pagadian City, the college offers elementary, secondary, and tertiary education.

=== Sta. Maria Goretti College ===
Sta. Maria Goretti has not developed its own undergraduate programs. It offered undergraduate programs while serving as a satellite campus for Saint Columban College. However, due to the preference of students to attend college in cities like Ozamiz and Pagadian, it ceased offering the same programs.

== Major Secondary Institutions ==
=== Holy Child Academy ===
Holy Child Academy or "HCA", is the oldest diocesan school. Established in 1940, HCA is also the second oldest school in Pagadian City and the Province of Zamboanga del Sur following the Southern Mindanao Colleges. HCA began as a parochial school, pioneering Catholic education in the Province.

=== Star of the Sea High School ===
Star of the Sea is the only private academic institution in the Municipality of Tukuran in Zamboanga del Sur.

=== Immaculate Heart Academy ===
Immaculate Heart Academy or "IHA", colloquially pronounced as [iha], is the largest academic institution in the Municipality of Dumalinao in Zamboanga del Sur.

== Other Institutions ==
The following are the other academic institutions in the Province of Zamboanga del Sur under the control of the Diocese of Pagadian.

Institution	Location
Sta. Teresita Academy	Municipality of Aurora
Holy Family High School	Municipality of Ramon Magsaysay
Holy Trinity High School	Municipality of Midsalip
San Isidro High School	Municipality of Tambulig
Sacred Heart Diocesan School	Municipality of Molave
San Jose Academy	Municipality of Dumingag
St. Andrew's Academy	Municipality of San Pablo
Lourdes Academy	Municipality of San Miguel
Immaculate Conception High School	Municipality of Pitogo
St. Ambrose High School	Municipality of Tabina
Pax High School	Municipality of Margosatubig

== See also ==
- Diocese of Pagadian
- Missionary Society of St. Columban
- Zamboanga del Sur
