= Star of the Sea High School =

Roman Catholic school in Zamboanga del Sur, Philippines

Star of the Sea High School, Inc.

Location
- Brgy. Sto. Niño, Tukuran, Zamboanga del Sur; Philippines
- Coordinates: 7°51′12″N 123°34′48″E

Information
- Type: Private school, Roman Catholic
- Opened: 1967; 58 years ago
- Superintendent: Fr. Foelan G. Echavez, MA
- CEEB code: 404268
- Principal: Airen S. Dela Torre, MA
- Grades: Grades 7 to 10
- Campus type: suburban
- Color(s): blue and white
- Newspaper: Starian Sage
- Affiliations: Diocesan Schools Group of Pagadian; Catholic Educational Association of the Philippines

Star of the Sea High School (SSHS) is a parochial high school in the coastal municipality of Tukuran, Zamboanga del Sur, Philippines. Previously controlled by the Missionary Society of St. Columban, Star of the Sea is run by Diocese of Pagadian as with the other Diocesan Schools of Pagadian.

== Basic Information ==
Rev. Fr. Kenneth Koster, a priest, founded the school in 1967.

== Sister Schools ==
- Saint Columban College in Pagadian City
- Holy Child Academy in Pagadian City
- Immaculate Heart Academy in Dumalinao, Zamboanga del Sur
