= Emmanuel Cabajar =

Filipino bishop

His Excellency, The Most Reverend Emmanuel Cabajar C.Ss.R, D.D.
- Bishop Emeritus of Pagadian
- Province: Ozamis
- See: Pagadian
- Appointed: May 14, 2004
- Installed: September 2, 2004
- Retired: November 22, 2018
- Predecessor: Zacharias Jimenez
- Successor: Ronald I. Lunas

Orders
- Ordination: December 18, 1966
- Consecration: August 14, 2004 by Ricardo J. Vidal

Personal details
- Born: Emmanuel Treveno Cabajar; October 8, 1942 (age 84) Jandayan Island, Jetafe, Talibon, Bohol, Philippines
- Denomination: Roman Catholicism
- Residence: Bishop's Residence, Balangasan District, Pagadian City, Philippines
- Education: St. Alphonsus Seminary
- Alma mater: St. Anthelmo in Rome
- Motto: Notam fac mihi viam tuam Domine ("Make the way known to me, my Lord")

Ordination history
History
Episcopal consecration
- Principal consecrator: Ricardo Vidal
- Co-consecrators: Antonio Franco; Ireneo A. Amantillo
- Styles
- Reference style: His Excellency; The Most Reverend
- Spoken style: Your Excellency
- Religious style: Bishop

Emmanuel "Manny" Treveno Cabajar (born October 8, 1942) is a Filipino bishop of the Catholic Church. He was Bishop of Pagadian from 2004 to 2018.

== Background ==
Cabajar was born on October 8, 1942, in Jandayan Island, Jetafe, Talibon, Bohol, Philippines. He entered priesthood as a member of the Congregation of the Most Holy Redeemer.

He attended Philosophy at the St. Alphonsus Seminary in Cebu City. He attained a master's degree and doctorate in Moral theology from St. Anthelmo in Rome and in Madrid, Spain, respectively.

== Priest ==
Cabajar lectured extensively on moral theology. He also served the Church in key positions.

Position	Term of Office	Organization
Professor of Moral Theology	1978–1985	Major Seminary in Remase, Davao City
Professor	1978–1985	St. Francis Xavier Seminary, Davao City
Superior	1984–1990	Redemptorist Community of Iligan City
Superior	1990–1993	Redemptorist Itinerant Community in Mindanao
Councilor	1990–1997	Vice Provincial
Vicar Provincial	1996	Cebu
Provincial Vicar and Superior	1996–1997	Community Holy Family
Member	1997–2004	General Council of the Redemptorist in Rome

== Bishop ==
Pope John Paul II named him Bishop of Pagadian on May 14, 2004. He received his episcopal consecration from Cardinal Ricardo Jamin Vidal on August 14 and was installed on September 2. As Bishop of Pagadian, he governed the sixteen Diocesan Schools of Pagadian. He also sits as chairman of the Board of Trustees of Saint Columban College.

In the Catholic Bishops' Conference of the Philippines, he has served as chairman, Vice Chairman, and member of episcopal commissions.

Position	Term of Office	Organization
Chairman	2007–2011	CBCP Episcopal Commission on Culture
Member	2007–2011	CBCP Episcopal Commission on Ecumenical Affairs
Vice Chairman	2011–2013	CBCP Episcopal Commission on Culture
Member	2011–2013	Commission on Inter-religious Dialogue
Member	2013–2015	Commission on Ecumenical Affairs

In February 2017, Cabajar played host to Msgr. Jose R. Manguiran, Bishop Emeritus of Dipolog, and delegates of the Mindanao Convention on Family and Life held in Pagadian City. A week after, he played host again to the delegates of the National Convention on Family and Life, led by Archbishop Gilbert A. Garcera of the Archdiocese of Lipa.

Pope Francis accepted his resignation as bishop on November 22, 2018.

Catholic Church titles
Preceded by Zacharias Jimenez	Bishop of Pagadian; September 2, 2004 – November 22, 2018	Succeeded by Ronald Lunas
