= Herrmann Jungraithmayr =

Austrian Africanist (born 1931)

- Born: Herrmann Rudolf Jungraithmayr; 7 May 1931 (age 95); Eferding, Austria
- Occupation: Linguist

Academic background
- Education: University of Vienna (1950–1953) and University of Hamburg (1953–1956)

Academic work
- Doctoral students: Al-Amin Abu-Manga
- Main interests: Chadic languages

Herrmann Rudolf Jungraithmayr (born 7 May 1931) is an Austrian Africanist and retired university professor. Until 1996, he was the chair of African linguistics at the Goethe University Frankfurt in Germany.

Herrmann Jungraithmayr is a brother of Alfred Jungraithmayr.

== Career ==
Jungraithmayr studied African Studies, Egyptology and Ethnology at the University of Vienna (1950–1953) and the University of Hamburg (1953–1956). He studied under Wilhelm Czermak (Vienna) and Johannes Lukas (Hamburg).

From 1956 to 1959, he was a lecturer at the Goethe-Institut Cairo, and taught at Orman and Ibrahimiyya high schools. In 1957, he taught German at Al-Azhar University. From 1960 to 1963, he was a research assistant at the Seminar for African Languages at the University of Hamburg. From 1963 to 1967, he was an assistant at Philipps University in Marburg, where he habilitated in 1967 and then worked as a private lecturer. In 1968/69, he was an assistant professor at Howard University in Washington, D.C. From 1972 to 1985, he was a professor of African Studies at Philipps University, Marburg. In between, he was also a visiting professor at the University of Maiduguri in Nigeria in 1983. From 1985 to 1996 he was chair of African linguistics at Johann Wolfgang Goethe University in Frankfurt am Main. There, he founded the Institute for African Linguistics, now known as the Institute for African Studies.

=== Research trips ===
- 1958/9: Darfur expedition (Sudan and Chad), together with Alfred Jungraithmayr and Franz Ortner, with the support of the Wenner Gren Foundation, New York
- 1962: One year of field research in Northern Nigeria, as a research assistant at Johannes Lukas, Hamburg, with the support of the German Research Foundation (DFG)
- 1969: Southern Nigeria and Western Cameroon: voice recordings as part of the DFG project Africa Maps
- 1970–1980: Several trips to Chad to document Chadic languages (Mubi, Migama, Mokilko, etc.)
- 1989–2002: Several research trips to Northern Nigeria

=== Scientific work ===
Jungraithmayr has carried out extensive documentation of Chadic languages spoken in Central Africa.

He has found that Chadic languages are more conservative in the east than in the west.

== Publications ==
=== Books ===
- Die Ron-Sprachen. Glückstadt 1970: ISBN noch nicht existent
- Märchen aus dem Tschad. Düsseldorf/Köln 1981. ISBN 3-424-00707-2
- Lexique mokilko. Berlin 1990. ISBN 3-496-00558-0
- A Dictionary of the Tangale Language. Berlin 1991. ISBN 3-496-00593-9
- (with Wilhelm J. G. Möhlig) Lexikon der afrikanistischen Erzählforschung. Köln 1998. ISBN 3-927620-64-5
- Sindi. Tangale Folktales. Berlin 2002. ISBN 3-89645-110-3
- La langue mubi (République du Tchad). Berlin 2013. ISBN 978-3-496-02852-9
- Der perfekte Ton. Stuttgart 2008. ISBN 978-3-515-09207-4
- (with Wilhelm J. G. Möhlig) Einführung in die Hausa-Sprache. Berlin 1976; 3. Aufl. 1985
- (with Wilhelm J. G. Möhlig und Anne Storch) Lehrbuch der Hausa-Sprache. Köln 2004. ISBN 3-89645-006-9
- (with Wilhelm J. G. Möhlig) Lexikon der Afrikanistik. Berlin 1983. ISBN 3-496-00146-1
- (with D. Ibriszimow) Chadic Lexical Roots, 2 Bände. Berlin 1994. ISBN 3-496-00560-2
- (with P. I. Diyakal) Lyang Lu. One thousand and one proverbs, idioms and sayings in Mushere (N. Nigeria). Stuttgart 2008. ISBN 978-3-515-09231-9
- Die Dreidimensionalität afrikanischer Sprachen. Marburg 2015, ISBN 978-3-943556-45-2
- (with Miroslawa Holubavá) The Ngas Language (Shik Ngas). Berlin 2016. ISBN 978-3-496-01555-0
- (with Marie Ngom) workgeheimisse afrikanischer Sprachen. Marburg 2018. ISBN 978-3-943556-78-0

=== Periodicals ===
- Chadic Newsletter 1970–1998
- (with Hans-Jürgen Greschat, Wolf Haenisch and Wilhelm Rau) Marburger Studien zur Afrika- und Asienkunde 1973 ff.
- (with H.-J. Greschat) Africana Marburgensia 1968–1989
- (with N. Cyffer and R. Vossen) Westafrikanische Studien 1994 ff.
- Sprache und Oralität in Afrika, 1989–2010

=== Audio documentation ===
- Sprachaufnahmen aus Sudan and Tschad, 1958/9, unter anderem zur Daju-Sprache, 13 Tonbänder, archiviert in Frankfurt a. M.
- Sprachaufnahmen aus Nigeria and Tschad, 1962–2004, archiviert im Phonogrammarchiv der Österreichischen Akademie der Wissenschaften unter „Sammlung Herrmann Jungraithmayr 1962–2004“

== Bibliography ==
- H. Jungraithmayr: Ein Leben mit afrikanischen Sprachen, Paideuma 52 (2006) and 53 (2007)
- Gábor Takács (ed.) Semito-Hamitic Festschrift for A. B. Dolgopolsky and H. Jungraithmayr. Berlin 2008. ISBN 978-3-496-02810-9
- Studia Chadica (Festschrift zum 80. Geb.), Köln 2011
