= Anne Storch =

German linguist in African studies

- Born: 16 September 1968; Frankfurt am Main, Germany
- Occupation: Linguist

Academic work
- Main interests: African linguistics

Anne Storch (born 16 September 1968 in Frankfurt am Main, Germany) is a German linguist and professor of African studies at the University of Cologne.

== Career ==
Storch studied African linguistics, ethnology, and history at Frankfurt am Main.

From 1995 to 1999, she worked as a researcher at the University of Frankfurt. As a doctoral student, she documented the Hõne language during several research trips to Nigeria. In 1999, she completed her PhD in African linguistics. From 2000 to 2004, she held a junior professorship position at the Institute for African Linguistics at the University of Frankfurt. Since 2004, she has been a full professor and member of the board at the Institute for African Studies at the University of Cologne.

In addition to Nigeria, Anne Storch has performed linguistic fieldwork in Sudan and Uganda.

From 2006 to 2009, she was chair of the German African Studies Association. From 2014 to 2016, she was also President of the International Association for Colonial and Postcolonial Linguistics, together with Eeva Sippola.

In 2017, she was awarded a Gottfried Wilhelm Leibniz Prize from the German Research Foundation.

In 2018, Storch was elected to the North Rhine-Westphalian Academy of Sciences, Humanities and the Arts.

== Research interests ==
Anne Storch's work focuses on Benue-Congo (especially Jukun), Atlantic, West Nilotic, comparative linguistics, typology, and sociolinguistics. Recently, for example, she has also studied language acquisition and use among African migrants working as street artists and other tourism-related occupations in the Balearic Islands.

== Selected publications ==
- Die Anlautpermutation in den westatlantischen Sprachen. Frankfurter Afrikanistische Blätter, Sondernummer 2, 1995, ISBN 978-0-00937-303-9
- Das Hone und seine Stellung im Zentral-Jukunoid. (Dissertation), Köppe, Köln 1999, ISBN 978-3-89645-107-1
- Forthcoming. Tourism and Discourses on Ruination (with Angelika Mietzner)
- Magic and Gender (with Sabine Dinslage). Köppe, Köln 2000, ISBN 978-3-89645-108-8
- Lehrbuch der Hausa-Sprache (with Herrmann Jungraithmayr, Wilhelm J.G. Möhlig). Köppe, Köln 2004, ISBN 978-3-89645-006-7
- The Noun Morphology of Western Nilotic. Köppe, Köln 2005, ISBN 978-3-89645-139-2
- Secret Manipulations: Language and Context in Africa. Oxford University Press, New York 2011, ISBN 978-0-19976-902-5
- Repertoires and Choices in African Languages. (with Friederike Lüpke) De Gruyter Mouton, Berlin 2013, ISBN 978-1-61451-194-6
- A Grammar of Luwo. An Anthropological Approach. (Culture and Language Use Studies in Anthropological Linguistics) John Benjamins Publishing, Amsterdam 2014, ISBN 978-9-02720-295-6
