= Al-Amin Abu-Manga =

Sudanese linguist

- Born: January 1, 1951; Maiurno, Sudan

Academic background
- Thesis: (1986)
- Doctoral advisor: Herrmann Jungraithmayr

Academic work
- Discipline: Linguistics
- Institutions: University of Khartoum

Al-Amin Abu-Manga (Arabic: الأمين أبومنقة) is a Sudanese linguist (born 1951), whose research focuses on language contact and description of language practice among Sudanese of West African origins (Fulani, Hausa, Songhay, Kanuri).

== Life ==
Al-Amin Abu-Manga was born in Maiurno (Sennar State) in 1951, to a Fulani family. He began his higher education at the University of Khartoum (1970-1976), and studied in France before finally completing a Ph.D. at the University of Marburg in Germany.

He has been Head of the Department of Sudanese and African Languages, Institute of African and Asian Studies, University of Khartoum since 1991.

He is Chairperson of Sudan's National Council of Cultural Heritage and Promotion of the National Languages (since 2017), and former Chairman of the Council for Development and Promotion of the National Languages (2009-2017).

== Linguistic research ==
Among other linguistic and ethnographic research, Abu-Manga has published monographs on Fulfulde and Hausa in the Sudan, addressing the influence of Arabic on these languages as spoken far from their West African heartlands.
