= Ronald Lunas =

Filipino Roman Catholic bishop (1966–2024)

His Excellency, The Most Reverend Ronald Ignacio Lunas D.D.
- Bishop of Pagadian
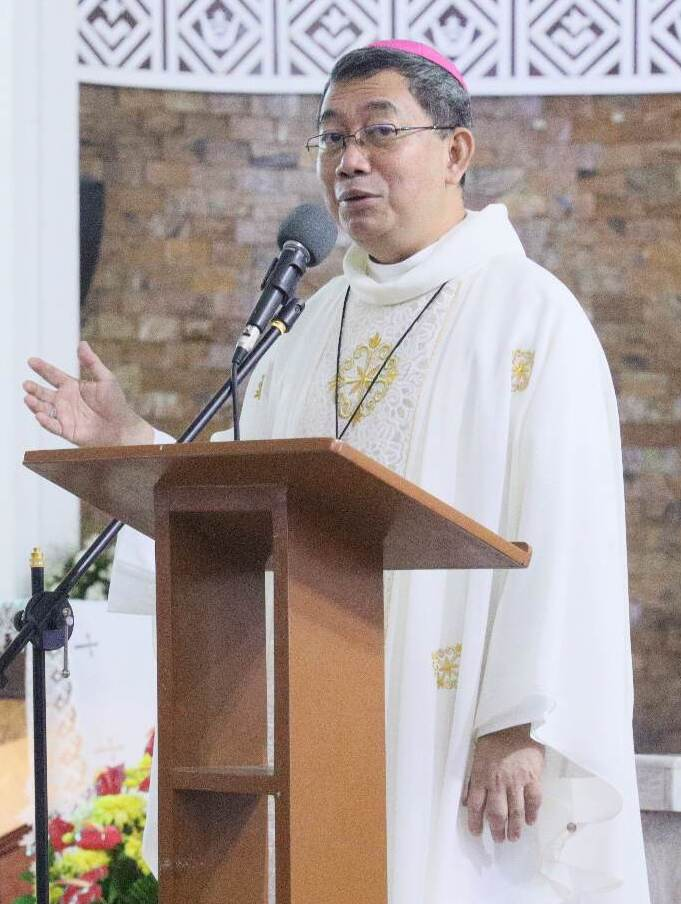
- Lunas in 2023
- Province: Ozamis
- See: Pagadian
- Appointed: November 22, 2018
- Installed: March 25, 2019
- Term ended: January 2, 2024
- Predecessor: Emmanuel Cabajar
- Successor: Ronald Timoner

Orders
- Ordination: April 7, 1992 by Generoso Cambronero Camiña
- Consecration: February 11, 2019 by Guillermo Dela Vega Afable

Personal details
- Born: Ronald Ignacio Lunas; November 27, 1966 Magsaysay, Philippines
- Died: January 2, 2024 (aged 57) Davao City, Philippines
- Denomination: Roman Catholicism
- Motto: Emmanuel ('God is with us')
- Coat of arms: Ronald Ignacio Lunas's coat of arms

Ordination history
History
Diaconal ordination
- Ordained by: Antonio Mabutas
Priestly ordination
- Ordained by: Generoso Cambronero Camiña
Episcopal consecration
- Principal consecrator: Guillermo Dela Vega Afable
- Co-consecrators: Martin Jumoad; Emmanuel Cabajar

Ronald Ignacio "Bong" Lunas (November 27, 1966 – January 2, 2024) was a Filipino Roman Catholic prelate who served as the fifth Bishop of Pagadian from 2018 until his death in 2024.

== Biography ==
Lunas studied philosophy and Catholic theology in Davao City and received the sacrament of ordination for the diocese of Digos on April 7, 1992.

After a short period of work in pastoral care in the Immaculate Conception Parish in Caburan, Lunas stayed in Rome from 1993 to 1996 for further studies. He obtained a licentiate in theology at the Pontifical Gregorian University. After returning home, he was initially a lecturer and later director of the St. Francis Xavier regional seminary in Davao City. From 2005 to 2008, he was chancellor of the diocesan curia and then pastor in Davao City. Beginning in 2013 he was episcopal vicar for the clergy of the diocese of Digos and was a member of the college of consultors and the priests' council. From 2014 until his appointment as bishop, he was also pastor of the parish of St. Joseph the Worker in Santa Cruz.

Lunas was appointed by Pope Francis as Bishop of Pagadian on November 22, 2018, succeeding Emmanuel Cabajar. He was installed on the Feast of the Annunciation in 2019.

Lunas died due to complications from heart bypass surgery on January 2, 2024, at the age of 57.

Catholic Church titles
Preceded by Emmanuel Cabajar	Bishop of Pagadian; March 25, 2019 – January 2, 2024	Succeeded by Ronald Timoner
