= Chavacano =

Spanish-based creole of the Philippines

- Chabacano
- Lengua Chavacano; Criollo Chavacano
- Native to: Philippines
- Region: Zamboanga City and Basilan (Zamboangueño and Basileño); Cavite City (Caviteño) and Ternate (Ternateño/Bahra)
- Ethnicity: Zamboangueño; Spanish Filipino
- Native speakers: 405,798 native speakers of Zamboangueño (2010) 10,840 native speakers of other varieties 1.2 million Zamboangueño speakers as a second language (1992)
- Language family: Spanish-based creole: Chavacano
- Writing system: Latin (Spanish alphabet)

Official status
- Official language in: Regional language in the Philippines
- Regulated by: Komisyon sa Wikang Filipino

Language codes
- ISO 639-3: cbk
- Glottolog: chav1241
- Linguasphere: 51-AAC-ba
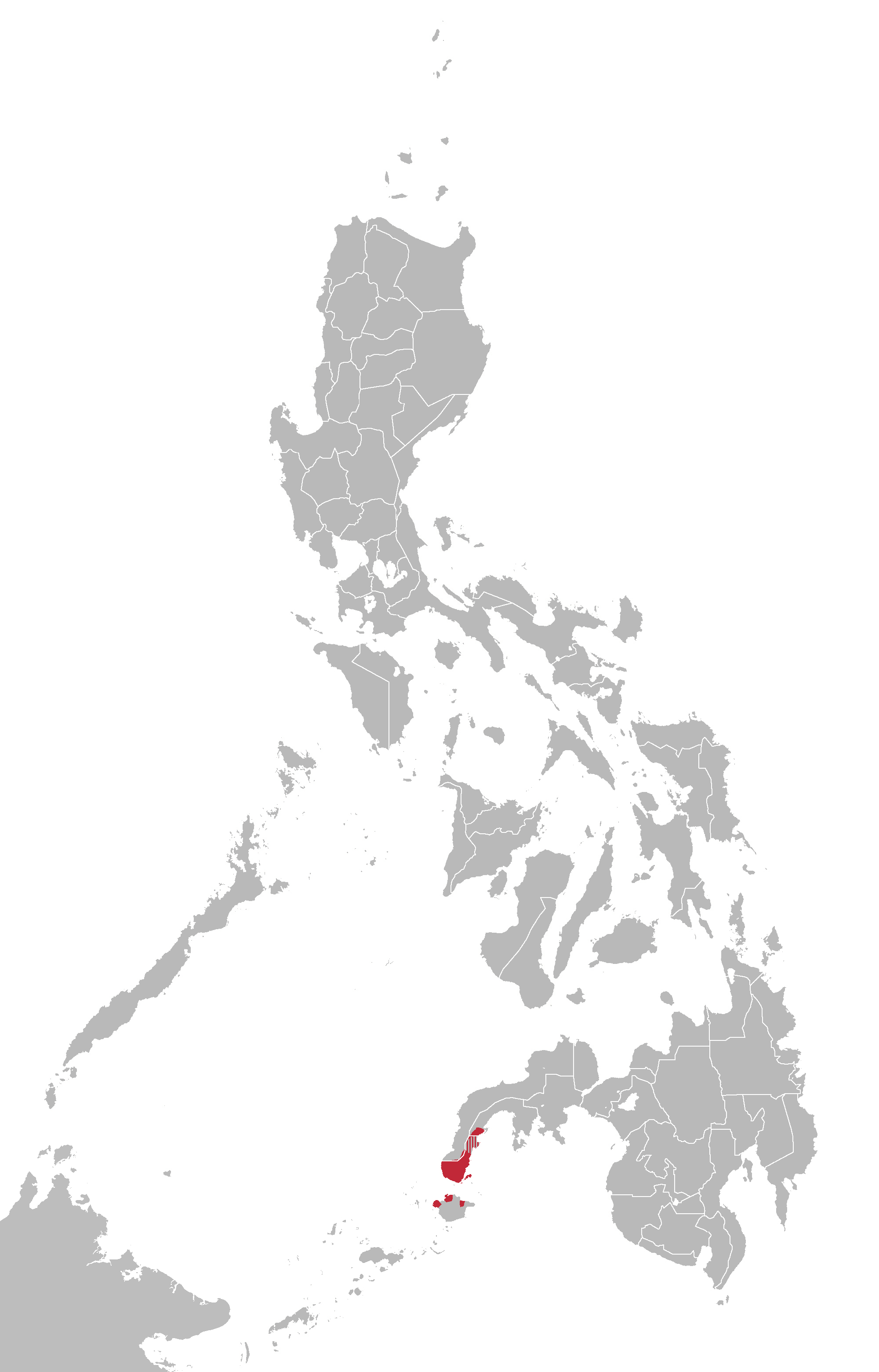
- Areas where Zamboangueño Chavacano is mainly spoken

Chavacano, also known as Chabacano (Spanish pronunciation: [tʃaβaˈkano]), is a Spanish-based creole language spoken in the Philippines. The variety spoken in Zamboanga City, located in the southern Philippine island group of Mindanao, has the highest concentration of speakers. Other currently existing varieties are found in Cavite City and Ternate, located in the Cavite province on the island of Luzon. Chavacano is the only Spanish-based creole in Asia. The 2020 Census of Population and Housing counted 106,000 households generally speaking Chavacano.

Zamboangueño-Chavacano is the most populous variety, the individual most commonly credited for the spread of this Spanish creole is Don Sebastián Hurtado de Corcuera, then governor of Panama. He settled Zamboanga City by recruiting soldiers and colonists from the New Kingdom of Granada and Viceroyalty of Peru, to establish a Spanish and Latin-American presence there. There was also a transpacific trade route that developed, where Spanish merchants would trade silver that was transported from Peru through Panama where it would reach Acapulco, Kingdom of Mexico before sailing to Manila using the famed Manila galleons. The Spanish chroniclers Vendrell & Eduard (1887:62), in speaking of Zamboanga, observed the following:

Estos indgenas, la inmensa mayoría mestizos españoles, proceden en su origen de otras provincias del Archipélago, y muchos de Méjico, de donde llegaron á principios de este siglo, cuando perdimos aquel imperio.

These indigenous people, the great majority of whom are Spanish mestizos, originally come from other provinces and from México, whence they arrived at the beginning of this century when we lost that empire.

Additionally, Argentines and Uruguayans like Juan Fermin de San Martin settled and made families in Zamboanga.

As for Ternateño-Chavacano, which is concentrated in; Ternate, Cavite, Two hundred families of Merdicas (of mixed Mexican-Filipino-Spanish and Papuan-Indonesian-Portuguese descent) from Ternate, Indonesia were resettled in a sandbar near the mouth of the Maragondon River (known as the Bahra de Maragondon) and Tanza, Cavite. Among them was their ruler, Sultan Said Din Burkat, who deported to Manila together with his entourage and family and later converted to Christianity.

Meanwhile, Caviteño-Chavacano and Ermiteño-Chavacano, of Cavite City, Cavite; and, Ermita, Manila; their main lexifiers were Peninsular-Spanish, from Spain, and Mexican-Spanish, from Mexico, and most of their immigrants were Spaniards and Mexicans.

The different varieties of Chavacano differ in certain aspects like vocabulary but they are generally mutually intelligible by speakers of these varieties, especially between neighboring varieties. While a majority of the lexicon of the different Chavacano varieties derive from Spanish, their grammatical structures are generally similar to other Philippine languages. Among Philippine languages, it is the only one that is not an Austronesian language, but like Malayo-Polynesian languages, it uses reduplication.

The word Chabacano is derived from Spanish, roughly meaning "poor taste" or "vulgar", though the term itself carries no negative connotations to contemporary speakers.

== Distribution and variants ==
=== Varieties ===
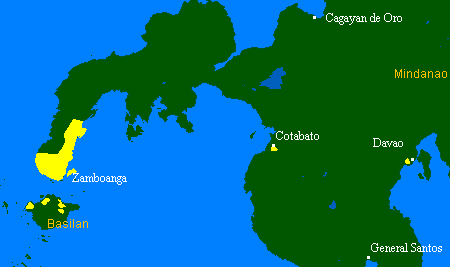
Native Zamboangueño speakers in Mindanao

Linguists have identified at least six Spanish creole varieties in the Philippines. Their classification is based on their substrate languages and the regions where they are commonly spoken. The three known varieties of Chavacano with Tagalog as their substrate language are the Luzon-based creoles of which are Caviteño (spoken in Cavite City), Bahra or Ternateño (spoken in Ternate, Cavite) and Ermitaño (once spoken in the old district of Ermita in Manila and is now extinct).

| Variety | Places | Main language of households (2020 census) | Native speakers |
|---|---|---|---|
| Zamboangueño (Zamboangueño; Chavacano/Chabacano de Zamboanga) | Zamboanga City, Tungawan; Isabela de Basilan; Lantawan, Basilan, Sulu; Tawi-Tawi; Zamboanga del Sur; Zamboanga del Norte; Zamboanga Sibugay | 104,470 | 359,000 (Rubino 2008, citing 2000 census) |
| Caviteño (Chabacano di Nisos/Chabacano de Cavite) | Cavite City, Cavite | 921 | 4,000 (2013) |
| Cotabateño (Chabacano de Cotabato) | Cotabato City, Maguindanao del Norte, South Cotabato | 442 | No data |
| Castellano Abakay (Chabacano Davaoeño) | Davao Region, Davao City | 542 | No data |
| Ternateño (Bahra) | Ternate, Cavite | No data | 3,000 (2013) |
| Ermitaño (Ermitense) | Ermita, Manila | 0 (extinct) | Extinct |

There are a number of theories on how these different varieties of Chavacano have evolved and how they are related to one another. According to some linguists, Zamboangueño Chavacano is believed to have been influenced by Caviteño Chabacano as evidenced by prominent Zamboangueño families who descended from Spanish Army officers (from Spain and Latin America), primarily Caviteño mestizos, stationed at Fort Pilar in the 19th century. When Caviteño officers recruited workers and technicians from Iloilo to man their sugar plantations and rice fields to reduce the local population's dependence on the Donativo de Zamboanga, the Spanish colonial government levied taxes on the islanders to support the fort's operations. With the subsequent migration of Ilonggo traders to Zamboanga, the Zamboangueño Chavacano was infused with Hiligaynon words as the previous migrant community was assimilated.

Most of what appears to be Bisaya words in Zamboangueño Chavacano are actually Hiligaynon. Although Zamboangueño Chavacano's contact with Bisaya began much earlier when Bisaya soldiers were stationed at Fort Pilar during the Spanish colonial period, it was not until closer to the middle of the 20th century that borrowings from Bisaya accelerated from more migration from the Visayas as well as the current migration from other Visayan-speaking areas of the Zamboanga Peninsula.

Zamboangueño (Chavacano) is spoken in Zamboanga City, Basilan, parts of Sulu and Tawi-Tawi, and Zamboanga del Sur, Zamboanga Sibugay and Zamboanga del Norte. Zamboangueño Chavacano is the most dynamically spoken language of Philippine Creole Spanish. It is used as a lingua franca between both Muslim and Christians in the Southwestern Mindanao and Basilan Islands communities. Its influence has spread to other islands in the west, such as the Jolo Islands, as well as to Cotabato and Davao in Mindanao. The other varieties of Chavacano with Cebuano as their primary substrate language are the Mindanao-based creoles of which are Castellano Abakay or Chavacano Davaoeño (spoken in some areas of Davao), influenced by Hokkien Chinese and Japanese, and divided into two varieties, Castellano Abakay Chino and Castellano Abakay Japón, and Cotabateño (spoken in Cotabato City). Both Cotabateño and Davaoeño are very similar to Zamboangueño.

=== Characteristics ===
The Chavacano languages in the Philippines are creoles based on Mexican Spanish, southern peninsular Spanish and possibly, Portuguese. In some Chavacano languages, most words are common with Andalusian Spanish, but there are many words borrowed from Nahuatl, a language native to Central Mexico, which aren't found in Andalusian Spanish. Although the vocabulary is largely Mexican, its grammar is mostly based on other Philippine languages, primarily Ilonggo, Tagalog and Bisaya. By way of Spanish, its vocabulary also has influences from the Native American languages Nahuatl, Taino, Quechua, etc. as can be evidenced by the words chongo ("monkey", instead of Spanish mono), tiange ("mini markets"), etc.

In contrast with the Luzon-based dialects, the Zamboangueño variety has the most borrowings and/or influence from other Philippine Austronesian languages including Hiligaynon and Tagalog. Words of Malay origin are present in the Zamboangueño variety; the latter is included because although not local in Philippines, it was the lingua franca of maritime Southeast Asia and is still spoken in Muslim areas of Mindanao. As the Zamboangueño variety is also spoken by Muslims, the variety has some Arabic loanwords, most commonly Islamic terms. In spite of this, it's difficult to trace whether these words have their origin in the local population or in Spanish itself, given that Spanish has about 6,000 words of Arabic origin. Chavacano also contains loanwords of Persian origin which enter Chavacano via Malay and Arabic; both Persian and Spanish are Indo-European languages.

=== Demographics ===
The highest number of Chavacano speakers are found in Zamboanga City and in the island province of Basilan. A significant number of Chavacano speakers are found in Cavite City and Ternate. There are also speakers in some areas in the provinces of Zamboanga del Sur, Zamboanga Sibugay, Zamboanga del Norte, Davao, and in Cotabato City. According to the official 2000 Philippine census, there were altogether 607,200 Chavacano speakers in the Philippines in that same year. The exact figure could be higher as the 2000 population of Zamboanga City, whose main language is Chavacano, far exceeded that census figure. Also, the figure doesn't include Chavacano speakers of the Filipino diaspora. All the same, Zamboangueño is the variety with the most number of speakers, being the official language of Zamboanga City whose population is now believed to be over a million; is also an official language in Basilan.

Chavacano speakers are also found in Semporna and elsewhere in Sabah via immigration to Sabah during the Spanish colonial period and via Filipino refugees who escaped from Zamboanga Peninsula and predominantly Muslim areas of Mindanao like Sulu Archipelago.

A small number of Zamboanga's indigenous peoples and of Basilan, such as the Tausugs, the Samals, and the Yakans, majority of those people are Sunni Muslims, also speak the language. In the close provinces of Sulu and Tawi-Tawi areas, there are Muslim speakers of the Chavacano de Zamboanga, all of them are neighbors of Christians. Speakers of the Chavacano de Zamboanga, both Christians and Muslims, also live in Lanao del Norte and Lanao del Sur. Christians and Muslims in Maguindanao del Norte, Maguindanao del Sur, Sultan Kudarat, Cotabato, South Cotabato, Cotabato City, and Saranggani speak Chavacano de Zamboanga. Take note that Zamboanga Peninsula, Basilan, Sulu, Tawi-tawi, Maguindanao del Norte, Maguindanao del Sur, Cotabato City, Soccsksargen (region that comprises Sultan Kudarat, Cotabato, South Cotabato, and Saranggani) and Davao Region became part of short-lived Republic of Zamboanga, which chose Chavacano as official language. As a result of Spanish colonization, according to a genetic study written by Maxmilian Larena, published in the Proceedings of the National Academy of Sciences of the United States, the Philippine ethnic groups with the highest amount of Spanish/European descent are the Chavacanos, with 4 out of 10 Chavacanos having detectable Spanish descent, followed by Bicolanos, with 1–2 out of 10, while most of the lowland urbanized Christian ethnic groups have some Spanish descent.

=== Social significance ===
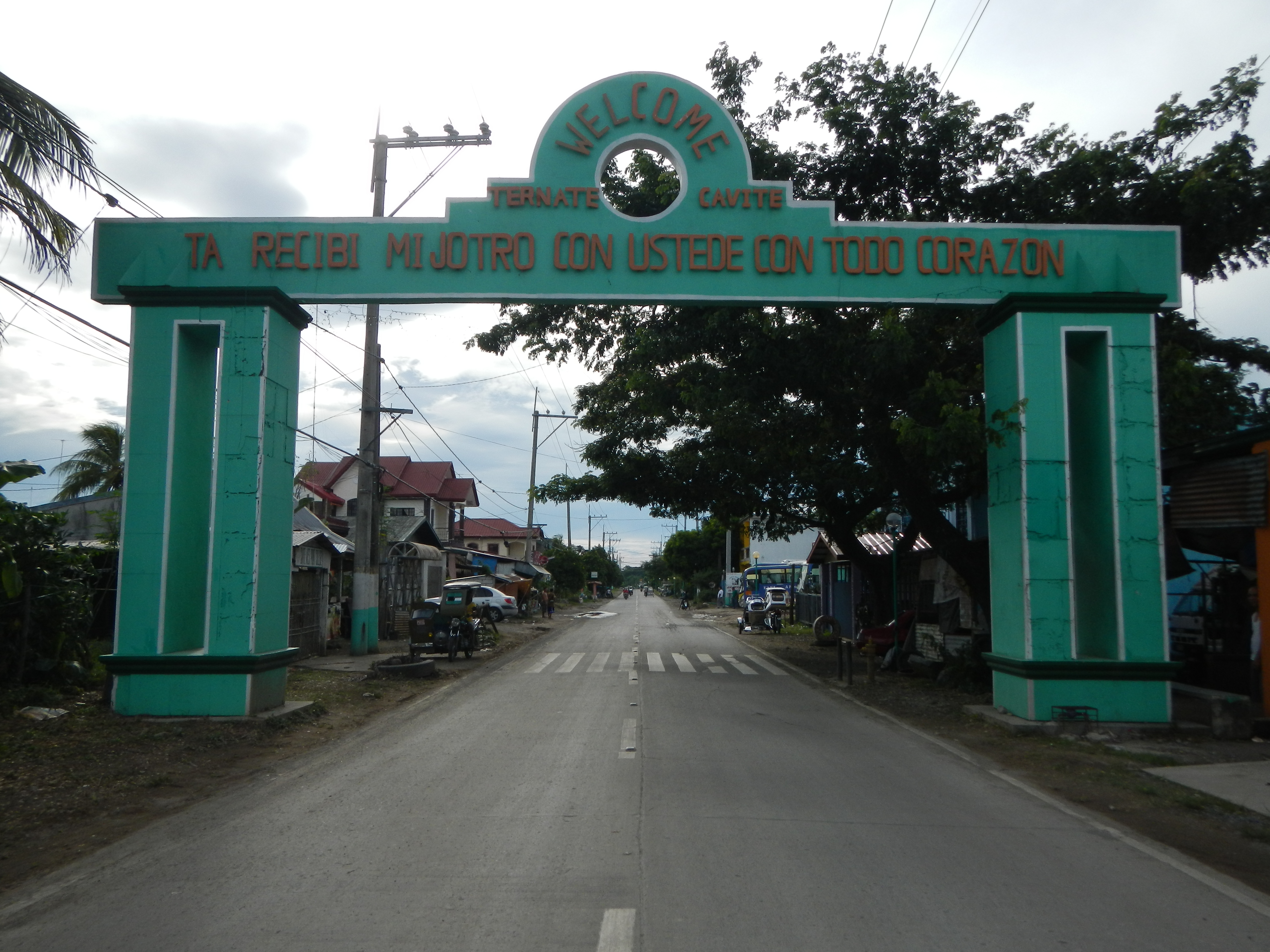
A welcome arch in Ternate with a Chavacano message that reads, "Ta recibi mijotro con ustede con todo corazon" ("We receive you with all our hearts")

Chavacano has been primarily and practically a spoken language. In the past, its use in literature was limited and chiefly local to the geographical location where the particular variety of the language was spoken. Its use as a spoken language far exceeds its use in literary work in comparison to the use of Spanish in the Philippines which was more successful as a written language than a spoken language. In recent years, there have been efforts to encourage the use of Chavacano as a written language, but the attempts were mostly minor attempts in folklore and religious literature and few pieces of written materials by the print media. In Zamboanga City, while the language is used by the mass media, the Catholic Church, education, and the local government, there have been few literary work written in Zamboangueño and access to these resources by the general public isn't readily available; Bibles of Protestant Christians are also written in standard Chavacano. As Chavacano is spoken by Muslims as second language not only in Zamboanga City and Basilan but even in Sulu and Tawi-tawi, a number of Qur'an books are published in Chavacano.

The Zamboangueño variety has been constantly evolving especially during half of the past century until the present. Zamboangueño has been experiencing an infusion of English and more Tagalog words and from other languages worldwide in its vocabulary and there have been debates and discussions among older Chavacano speakers, new generation of Chavacano speakers, scholars, linguists, sociologists, historians, and educators regarding its preservation, cultivation, standardization, and its future as a Spanish-based creole. In 2000, The Instituto Cervantes in Manila hosted a conference entitled "Shedding Light on the Chavacano Language" at the Ateneo de Manila University. Starting school year 2012–13, the Zamboangueño variant has also been taught at schools following the implementation of the Department of Education's policy of Mother Tongue-Based Multilingual Education (MTB-MLE). It serves as a medium of instruction from kindergarten to grade 3 and as a separate subject (Mother Tongue) from grades 1 to 3.

Because of the grammatical structures, Castilian usage, and archaic Spanish words and phrases that Chavacano (especially Zamboangueño) uses, between speakers of both contemporary Spanish and Chavacano who are uninitiated, both languages appear to be non-intelligible to a large extent. For the initiated speakers, Chavacano can be intelligible to some Spanish speakers, and while most Spanish words can easily be understood by Chavacano speakers, many would struggle to understand a complete Spanish sentence.

== Terminology ==
The term Chavacano or Chabacano originated from the Spanish word chabacano which literally means "poor taste", "vulgar", "common", "of low quality", or "coarse". Chavacano has since evolved into a word of its own in different spellings with no negative connotation, but to simply being the name of the language itself (Banquicio, 2021).

During the Spanish colonial period, what is today called Chavacano was also called by the Spanish-speaking population as the "lenguaje de la calle", "lenguaje de parian" (language of the street), or "lenguaje de cocina" (language of the kitchen) to refer to the Chabacano spoken by the people of Manila, particularly in Ermita) to distinguish it from the Spanish language spoken by those of the upper class, which consisted of Spaniards and educated Natives.

Linguists use the term Philippine Creole Spanish which can be further divided into two geographic classifications: Manila Bay Creoles (which includes Ternateño and Caviteño) and Mindanao Creole (including Zamboangueño). The varieties of the language are geographically related. The Manila Bay Creoles have Tagalog as their substrate language while The Mindanao Creoles have Visayan (mostly Cebuano, Tausug, and Hiligaynon), Subanon, and Sama as their substrate language(s).

Chavacano/Chabacano speakers themselves have different preferences on whether to spell the language with a V or a B. They emphasise the difference between their variety and others using their own geographical location as a point of reference. Language speakers in Ternate also use the term Bahra to refer to their language and their city. Chavacano varieties usually have their area name attached to the language.

In Zamboanga City, most people are using the V in spelling the language as Chavacano. In the three-day Chavacano Orthography Congress held on Nov 19–21, 2014, wherein it included the presentation by researchers on Chavacano, mostly results from surveys conducted among selected respondents in the city, the newly organized Chavacano Orthography Council met with the officials of the Department of Education and agreed among others that the language is to be spelled with the V. Most people in support of this move would like to distance their language Chavacano to the word Chabacano which also means ‘vulgar” in Spanish.

Chavacano/Chabacano varieties and alternative names
| Location | Geographical area | Alternative names and spellings |
|---|---|---|
| Zamboanga | Mindanao | Chavacano, Zamboangueño, Zamboangueño Chavacano |
| Cavite | Manila Bay | Chabacano de Cavite, Caviteño, Chabacano Caviteño, Linguaje de Niso |
| Basilan | Mindanao | Zamboangueño, Chavacano de Zamboanga |
| Cotabato | Mindanao | Cotabateño, Chavacano Cotabateño |
| Davao | Mindanao | Davaoeño, Chavacano Davaoeño, Castellano Abakay, Davao Chavacano |
| Ermita | Manila Bay | Ermitense, Ermita Chabacano |
| Ternate | Manila Bay | Ternateño, Ternateño Chabacano, Bahra, Linguaje di Bahra |

== Historical background ==
There is no definite conclusion on the precise history of how these different varieties of Chavacano developed.

Prior to the formation of what is today the Philippines, what existed were a collection of various islands and different ethnolinguistic groups inhabiting them. The Spanish colonisation of the Philippine islands had led to the presence of the Spanish language in the islands. Though Spanish was the language of the government, the various languages originating and found in the islands remained the mother tongue of the various inhabitants. Instead of using Spanish to spread Christianity, Spanish missionaries preferred to learn the various local languages. With over 300 years of Spanish colonial rule, the Spanish language came to influence the various Philippine languages to varying degrees by way of aspects like new loanwords and expressions.

Creole languages (such as French-based creoles) have formed at various points in time around the world due to colonialism. As a result of contact between speakers of two mutually non-intelligible languages, creole languages have evolved in some cases to facilitate communication. This usually involves taking the vocabulary of another language and grammatical features of the native language. In contrast to the numerous French-based creole languages, only three creole languages have been found to be Spanish-based or heavily influenced: Papiamento, Palenquero, and Chavacano. In the Philippines, a major difficulty in tracing the development of Chabacano is the confusion attributed to in accounts of travelers to the Philippines between a coherent creole language, `broken Spanish', and fluent Spanish. The earliest believed attestation of a coherent creole language spoken in Cavite City comes from the Augustinian priest Martínez de Zúñiga who in his 1803 accounts of his travels in the Philippines, Estadismos de las Islas Filipinas, notes that "In Cavite and in its suburb of San Roque, a very corrupted Spanish is spoken, whose phraseology is entirely taken from the language of the country". Mentions of a vernacular referred to as "kitchen Spanish" and "language of the market" (referring to the Manila variety), or other terms are found in a number of texts of the 19th century. However, the kind of vernacular referred to by these terms are imprecise and these terms may refer to a fully fledged creole or to a Spanish-pidgin spoken by Chinese and Filipino merchants.

The manner of formation of this type of speech found in a number of communities around the Philippines remains unclear today. A sample of what is today called Chabacano may be found in dialogues contained in chapters 18 (Supercherías) and 28 (Tatakut) of Filipino writer José Rizal's 1891 work El Filibusterismo. The dialogue found in chapter 18 is:

¿Porque ba no di podí nisós entrá? preguntaba una voz de mujer.

―Abá, ñora, porque ‘tallá el maná prailes y el maná empleau, contestó un hombre; ‘ta jasí solo para ilós el cabesa de espinge.

―¡Curioso también el maná prailes! dijo la voz de mujer alejándose; ¡no quiere pa que di sabé nisos cuando ilos ta sali ingañau! ¡Cosa! ¡Querida be de praile el cabesa!

In the 1883 work of German linguist Hugo Schuchardt Uber das Malaiospanische der Philippinen, he presents fragments of texts and comments of what he calls "Malayo-Spanish". However, the first to give a general study and investigation of the varieties of Chavacano as a group was by Keith Whinnom in his 1956 work The Spanish Contact Vernaculars in the Philippine Islands . Whinnom gives an overall view of the history and grammar of what he calls "Ermitaño" of Ermita in Manila, "Caviteño" of Cavite and "Zamboangueño" of Zamboanga. In it, he also postulates his monogenetic theory on the origin of these vernaculars.

Linguists are unsettled about how these vernaculars formed and how they connect to one another, if any. There are many theories, but the two main theories of the origin of Chavacano are Whinnom's "monogenetic theory" and a "parallel-development" theory proposed by Frake in 1971.

=== Monogenetic theory ===
According to the monogenetic theory or one-way theory advanced by Whinnom, all varieties of Chavacano result from a single source, and all such varieties are related to each other.

=== Parallel-development theory ===
The parallel development theory or two-way theory as advocated by Frake in 1971, the variants found in Luzon and Mindanao had evolved autonomously from each other.

=== Zamboangueño ===
On 23 June 1635, Zamboanga City, which was part of the Subanon people's ancestral land, became a permanent foothold of the Spanish government with the construction of the San José Fortress. Bombardment and harassment from pirates and raiders of the sultans of Mindanao and Jolo and the determination to spread Christianity further south (as Zamboanga was a crucial strategic location) of the Philippines forced the Spanish missionary friars to request reinforcements from the colonial government.

The military authorities decided to import labour from Luzon and the Visayas. Thus, the construction workforce eventually consisted of Spanish, Mexican and Peruvian soldiers, masons from Cavite (who comprised the majority), sacadas from Cebu and Iloilo, and those from the various local tribes of Zamboanga like the Samals and Subanons.

Language differences made it difficult for one ethnic group to communicate with another. To add to this, work instructions were issued in Spanish. The majority of the workers were unschooled and therefore did not understand Spanish but needed to communicate with each other and the Spaniards. A pidgin developed and became a full-fledged creole language still in use today as a lingua franca and/or as an official language, mainly in Zamboanga City.

When the Sultanate of Sulu gave up its territories in Sulu Archipelago to Spain within late 1700s (Sulu Sultanate gave up Basilan to Spain in 1762, while Sulu and Tawi-tawi were not given up by sultanate because the Sulu Sultanate only recognised partial Spanish sovereignty to Sulu and Tawi-tawi), Spanish settlers and soldiers brought the language to the region until Spain, Germany, and United Kingdom signed an agreement named the Madrid Protocol of 1885 that recognised Spanish rule of Sulu Archipelago. Chavacano becomes a lingua franca of Sulu Archipelago (composing of Sulu, Tawi-tawi, Basilan), as these were formerly part of Western Mindanao (presently named Zamboanga Peninsula), only Isabela City (Basilan's capital) remained part of Zamboanga Peninsula; although North Borneo (now Sabah) is not included on the Spanish East Indies area as stated on the Protocol and control by the United Kingdom, Chavacano has still a little impact in Semporna.

From then on, constant Spanish military reinforcements as well as increased presence of Spanish religious and educational institutions have fostered the Spanish creole.

=== Caviteño/Ternateño ===
The Merdicas (also spelled Mardicas or Mardikas) were Catholic natives of the islands of Ternate and Tidore of the Moluccas in the vicinity of New Guinea, converted during the Portuguese occupation of the islands by Jesuit missionaries. The islands were later captured by the Spanish who vied for their control with the Dutch. In 1663, the Spanish garrison in Ternate was forced to pull out to defend Manila against an impending invasion by Koxinga, the new ruler of Kingdom of Tungning in Formosa (Taiwan) (sacrificing the Moluccas to the Dutch in doing so). A number of Merdicas volunteered to help, eventually being resettled in a sandbar near the mouth of the Maragondon river (known as the Barra de Maragondon) and Tanza, Cavite, Manila.

The invasion did not occur as Koxinga fell ill and died. The Merdicas' community eventually integrated into the local population. Today, the location of the community is called Ternate after the island of Ternate in the Moluccas, and the descendants of the Merdicas continue to use their Spanish creole (with Portuguese influence), which has come to be known as Caviteño or Ternateño Chavacano.

== Samples ==
=== Zamboangueño ===
Donde tu (ay) anda?
Spanish: ¿A dónde vas?
(‘Where are you going?’)
Ya mirá yo con José.
Spanish: Yo vi a José.
(‘I saw José.’)
Ya empezá ele buscá que buscá entero lugar con el sal.
Spanish: El/Ella empezó a buscar la sal en todas partes.
(‘He/She began to search everywhere for the salt.’)
Ya andá ele na escuela.
Spanish: Él/Ella se fue al colegio / a la escuela.
(‘He/She went to school.’)
Si Mario ya dormí na casa.
Spanish: Mario durmió en la casa.
(‘Mario slept in the house.’)
El hombre, con quien ya man encuentro tu, es mi hermano.
Spanish: El hombre que encontraste, es mi hermano.
(The man [whom] you met is my brother.)
El persona con quien tu tan cuento, bien alegre gayot.
Spanish: La persona con la que estás hablando es muy alegre. / La persona con quien tú estás conversando es bien alegre.
(The person you are talking to is very happy indeed.)

==== Another sample of Zamboangueño Chavacano ====
| Zamboangueño Chavacano | Spanish | English |
|---|---|---|
| Treinta y cuatro kilometro desde el pueblo de Zamboanga el Bunguiao, un diutay barrio que estaba un desierto. No hay gente quien ta queda aquí antes. Abundante este lugar de maga animales particularmente maga puerco 'e monte, gatorgalla, venao y otro más pa. Solamente maga pajariadores lang ta visitá con este lugar. | El Bunguiao, a treinta y cuatro kilómetros desde el pueblo de Zamboanga, es un pequeño barrio que una vez fue un área salvaje. No había gente que se quedara a vivir ahí. En este lugar había en abundancia animales salvajes tales como cerdos, gatos monteses, venados, y otros más. Este lugar era visitado únicamente por cazadores de pájaros. | Bunguiao, a small village, thirty four kilometers from the city of Zamboanga, was once a wilderness. No people lived here. The place abounded with wild animals such as pigs, wildcats, deer, and still others. The place was visited only by bird hunters. |

=== Ermitaño ===
En la dulzura de mi afán,
Junto contigo na un peñon
Mientras ta despierta
El buan y en
Las playas del Pasay
Se iba bajando el sol.

Yo te decía, "gusto ko"
Tu me decías, "justo na"
Y de repente
¡Ay nakú!
Ya sentí yo como si
Un asuáng ta cercá.

Que un cangrejo ya corré,
Poco a poco na tu lao.
Y de pronto ta escondé
Bajo tus faldas, ¡amoratáo!

Cosa que el diablo hacé,
Si escabeche o kalamáy,
Ese el que no ta sabé
Hasta que yo ya escuché
Fuerte-fuerte el voz: ¡Aray!

The following is a sample of Ermitaño taken from the April 1917 publication of The Philippine Review. The poem was written by the Filipino Spanish-language writer Jesús Balmori (who also wrote other texts in Ermitaño), and it is entitled "Na Maldito Arena":

Ta sumí el sol na fondo del mar, y el mar, callao el boca. Ta jugá con su mana marejadas com'un muchacha nerviosa con su mana pulseras. El viento no mas el que ta alborota, el viento y el pecho de Felisa que ta lleno de sampaguitas na fuera y lleno de suspiros na dentro...

According to Keith Whinnom's "Spanish contact vernaculars in the Philippine Islands" (1956), there were reportedly still an estimated 12,000 speakers in 1942 of Ermitaño. After World War II, much of Manila was destroyed and its citizens displaced. This variety is considered to be virtually extinct.

=== Caviteño/Ternateño ===
Nisós ya pidí pabor cun su papáng.
Spanish: Nosotros ya pedimos un favor de tu padre.
(We have already asked your father for a favor.)

Ternateño follows a pronominal system of three different pronouns, including subjects, objects and possession. The system follows the same pattern as Spanish, including both singular and plural conjugations based on what the speaker is explaining. For example yo (Spanish singular) becomes bo (Ternateño), whereas nosotros (Spanish plural) becomes mihótro (Ternateño). Additionally Ternateño incorporates alternate language forms for different participles to denote the relationship with the individual being the speaker as well as the listener. This includes polite as well as casual foundations of speech, for example, yo (casual) versus (éle).

==== Another sample of Caviteño Chavacano ====
Caviteño Chavacano:

Puede nisós hablá: que grande nga palá el sacrificio del mga héroes para niso independencia. Debe nga palá no niso ulvida con ilos. Ansina ya ba numa? Debe hací niso mga cosa para dale sabí que ta aprecia niso con el mga héroes. Que preparáo din niso hací sacrificio para el pueblo. ¿Qué laya? ¿Escribí mga novela como José Rizal?

Spanish:

Nosotros podemos decir qué grandes sacrificios ofrecieron nuestros héroes para obtener nuestra independencia. Entonces, no nos olvidemos de ellos. ¿Cómo lo logramos? Necesitamos hacer cosas para que sepan que apreciamos a nuestros héroes; que estamos preparados también a sacrificarnos por el pueblo. ¿Cómo lo haremos? ¿Hay que escribir también novelas como José Rizal?

English:

We can say what great sacrifices our heroes have done to achieve our independence. We should therefore not forget them. How do we do that? We should do things to let it be known that we appreciate the heroes; that we are prepared to make sacrifices for our people. How? Should we write novels like José Rizal?

=== Castellano Abakay (Davaoeño Chavacano) ===
Below are samples of dialogues and sentences of Davaoeño in two spoken forms: Castellano Abakay Chino (Chinese style) by the Chinese speakers of Chabacano and Castellano Abakay Japon (Japanese style) by the Japanese speakers.

==== Castellano Abakay Chino ====
- Note: only selected phrases are given with Spanish translations, some are interpretations and rough English translations are also given.

La Ayuda
Ayudante: Señor, yo vino aquí para pedir vos ayuda.
(Spanish: Señor, he venido aquí para pedir su ayuda.)
(English: Sir, I have come here to ask for your help.)

Patron: Yo quiere prestá contigo diez pesos. Ese ba hija tiene mucho calentura. Necesita llevá doctor.
(Spanish: Quiero pedirle diez pesos prestados. Mi hija tiene calentura. Necesita un médico.)
(English: I want borrow ten pesos from you. My daughter has a fever. She needs a doctor.)

Valentina y Conching (Conchita)
Valentina: ¿¡Conching, dónde vos (tu) papá?! ¿No hay pa llegá?
Spanish: ¿¡Conching, dónde está tu papá?! ¿No ha llegado todavía?
English: Conching, where is your dad? Hasn't he arrived yet?
Conching: Llegá noche ya. ¿Cosa quiere ako (yo) habla cuando llegá papa?
Spanish: Llegará esta noche. ¿Qué quiere que le diga cuando llegue?
English: He will arrive this evening. What do you want me to tell him when he comes?

Ako (yo) hablá ese esposa mio, paciencia plimelo (primero). Cuando male negocio, comé nugaw (lugaw – puré de arroz). Pero, cuando bueno negocio, katáy (carnear) manok (pollo).
Spanish: Me limitaré a decir a mi esposa, mis disculpas. Cuando nuestro negocio va mal, comemos gachas. Pero si funciona bien, carneamos y servimos pollo.
English: I will just tell my wife, my apologies. We eat porridge when our business goes very badly. But if it goes well, then we will butcher and serve chicken.

¡Corre pronto! ¡Caé aguacero! Yo hablá contigo cuando salé casa lleva payóng (paraguas). No quiere ahora mucho mojáo.
Spanish: ¡Corre rápido! ¡La lluvia está cayendo! Ya te dije que cuando salgas de tu casa, debes llevar un paraguas. No quiero que te mojes.
English: Run quickly! It's raining! I already told you to take an umbrella when you leave the house. I don't want you to get wet.

¿Ese ba Tinong (Florentino) no hay vergüenza? Anda visita casa ese novia, comé ya allí. Ese papa de iya novia, regañá mucho. Ese Tinong, no hay colocación. ¿Cosa dale comé esposa después?
Spanish: ¿Que Florentino no tiene vergüenza? Fue a visitar a su novia, y comió allí. El padre de su novia lo regaña mucho. Florentino no tiene trabajo. ¿Qué le proveerá a su esposa después?
English: Doesn't Florentino have any shame? He went to visit his girlfriend and ate dinner there. Her father scolds him a lot. That Florentino has no job. What will he provide for his wife then?

==== Castellano Abakay Japon ====
Estimated English translations provided with Japanese words.

¿Por qué usted no andá paseo? Kará tiene coche, viaje usted. ¿Cosa hace dinero? Trabaja mucho, no gozá.
Why don't you go for a walk? You travel by your car. What makes money? You work a lot, you don't enjoy yourself.

- Kará (から) – por (Spanish); from or by (English)

Usted mirá porque yo no regañá ese hijo mío grande. Día-día sale casa, ese ba igual andá oficina; pero día-día pide dinero.
Look because I don't tell off that big son of mine. Every day he leaves the house, the same for walking to the office; but every day he asks for money.

Señora, yo dale este pescado usted. No grande, pero mucho bueno. Ese kirei y muy bonito. (op. cit.)
Madam, I give this fish to you. It's not big, but it's very good. It is gorgeous and very nice.

- Kirei (綺麗) – hermosa, bonita, bella (Spanish); beautiful, bonny (English)

=== Pledge of Allegiance to the Philippine Flag ===
==== Zamboangueño ====
Yo (soy) un Filipino.
Yo ta prometé mi lealtad
na bandera de Filipinas
y el País que ese ta representá
Con Honor, Justicia y Libertad
que ya pone na movemiento el un nación
para Dios,
para'l pueblo,
para naturaleza,
y para Patria.

==== Spanish ====
(Yo) soy un filipino.
yo prometo mi lealtad
a la bandera de las Filipinas
y al país que esta representa
con honor, justicia y libertad
puestos en movimiento por una nación
por Dios,
por el pueblo,
por la naturaleza
y por la patria.

==== English ====
I am a Filipino
I pledge my allegiance
To the flag of the Philippines
And to the country it represents
With honour, justice and freedom
Put in motion by one Nation
For God
for the People,
for Nature and
for the Country.

== Vocabulary ==
=== Forms and style ===
Chavacano (especially Zamboangueño) has two registers or sociolects: The common, colloquial, vulgar or familiar and the formal register/sociolects. Broadly speaking, the formal register is closer to Spanish, and the colloquial register to the local Austronesian languages.

In the common, colloquial, vulgar or familiar register/sociolect, words of local origin or a mixture of local and Spanish words predominate. The common or familiar register is used ordinarily when conversing with people of equal or lower status in society. It is also used more commonly in the family, with friends and acquaintances. Its use is of general acceptance and usage.

In the formal register/sociolect, words of Spanish origin or Spanish words predominate. The formal register is used especially when conversing with people of higher status in society. It is also used when conversing with elders (especially in the family and with older relatives) and those in authority. It is more commonly used by older generations, by Zamboangueño mestizos, and in the barrios. It is the form used in speeches, education, media, and writing. The formal register used in conversation is sometimes mixed with some degree of colloquial register.

The following examples show a contrast between the usage of formal words and common or familiar words in Chavacano:

| English | Chavacano (formal) | Chavacano (common/colloquial/vulgar/familiar) | Spanish |
|---|---|---|---|
| slippery | resbalozo/resbaladizo | malandug | resbaloso/resbaladizo |
| rice | morisqueta | kanon/arroz | morisqueta (understood as a Filipino rice dish)/arroz |
| rain | lluvia/aguacero | aguacero/ulan | lluvia/aguacero |
| dish | vianda/comida | comida/ulam | vianda/comida |
| braggart/boastful | orgulloso(a) | bugalon(a)/ hambuguero(a) | orgulloso(a) |
| car | coche | auto | auto/coche |
| housemaid | muchacho (m)/muchacha (f) | ayudanta (female); ayudante (male) | muchacha(o)/ayudante |
| father | papá (tata) | pápang (tata) | papá (padre) |
| mother | mamá (nana) | mámang (nana) | mamá (madre) |
| grandfather | abuelo | abuelo/lolo | abuelo/lolo |
| grandmother | abuela | abuela/lola | abuela/lela |
| small | chico(a)/pequeño(a) | pequeño(a)/diutay | pequeño/chico |
| nuisance | fastidio | asarante/salawayun | fastidio |
| hard-headed | testarudo | duro cabeza/duro pulso | testarudo/cabeza dura |
| slippers | chancla | chinelas | chancla/chinelas |
| married | de estado/de estao | casado/casao | casado |
| (my) parents | (mis) padres | (mi) tata'y nana | (mis) padres |
| naughty | travieso(a) | guachi/guachinanggo(a) | travieso(a) |
| slide | rezbalasa/deslizar | landug | resbalar/deslizar |
| ugly | feo (masculine)/fea (feminine) | malacara, malacuka | feo(a) |
| rainshower | lluve | talítih | lluvia |
| lightning | rayo | rayo/quirlat | rayo |
| thunder/thunderstorm | trueno | trueno | trueno |
| tornado | tornado/remolino, remulleno | ipo-ipo | tornado/remolino |
| thin (person) | delgado(a)/flaco(a)/chiquito(a) | flaco/flaquit | delgado/flaco/flaquito |

== Writing system ==
Chavacano is written using the Latin script. As Chavacano has mostly been a spoken language than a written one, multiple ways of writing the different varieties of Chavacano exist. Most published Chavacano texts utilize spelling systems nearly identical to Spanish, adjusting certain spellings of words to reflect how they are pronounced by native Chavacano speakers. Since the propagation of the usage of the Filipino language in education and the media as the national language, Filipino's orthography has affected how certain persons might spell Chavacano, especially since recent generations have grown unfamiliar with Spanish orthography; Most published works, and the general media, however, more often retain Spanish-based spelling systems.

The kind of writing system used to write Chavacano may differ according to the writer of the text. Writing may be written using a Spanish-derived writing system, where all words (including words of local origin) are spelled adhering to basic Spanish orthographic rules; it may also be written "phonetically", similar to the modern orthography of Filipino; another writing style uses a mixture of the two, spelling words based on an etymological approach, using phonetic spelling for words of Filipino origin and Spanish spelling rules for words of Spanish origin.

in Zamboanga, an etymological-based approach was formally recently endorsed by the local city government and this is the system used in public schools as part of the mother-tongue policy of the Department of Education for kindergarten to grade 3. In principle, words of Spanish origin are to be spelled using Spanish rules while Chavacano words of local origin are spelled in the manner according to their origin. Thus, the letter k appear mostly in words of Austronesian origin or in loanwords from other Philippine languages (words such as kame, kita, kanamon, kaninyo).

It is uncommon in modern written works to include the acute accent and the trema in writing except in linguistic or highly formalized texts. Also, the letters ñ and ll are sometimes replaced by ny and ly in informal texts.

=== Alphabet ===
The Chavacano alphabet has 30 letters, including ⟨ch⟩, ⟨ll⟩, ⟨ñ⟩, and ⟨rr⟩:

a, b, c, ch, d, e, f, g, h, i, j, k, l, ll, m, n, ñ, o, p, q, r, rr, s, t, u, v, w, x, y, z

==== Letters and letter names ====
| A a | a /a/ | J j | jota /ˈxota/ | R r | ere /ˈeɾe/ |
| B b | be /be/ | K k | ka /ka/ | Rr rr | erre /ˈere/ |
| C c | ce /se/ | L l | ele /ˈele/ | S s | ese /ˈese/ |
| Ch ch | che /tʃe/ | Ll ll | elle /ˈeʎe/ | T t | te /te/ |
| D d | de /de/ | M m | eme /ˈeme/ | U u | u /u/ |
| E e | e /e/ | N n | ene /ene/ | V v | uve /ˈube/ |
| F f | efe /ˈefe/ | Ñ ñ | eñe /ˈeɲe/ | W w | doble u /ˈuve doble/ |
| G g | ge /xe/ | O o | o /o/ | X x | equis /ˈekis/ |
| H h | hache /ˈatʃe/ | P p | pe /pe/ | Y y | ye /ɟʝe/ |
| I i | i /i/ | Q q | cu /ku/ | Z z | zeta /ˈseta/ zeda /ˈseda/ |

Other letter combinations include rr (erre), which is pronounced /xr/ or /r/, and ng, which is pronounced /ŋɡ/. Another combination was ñg, which was pronounced /ŋ/ but is now obsolete and is only written as ng.

Some sounds are not represented in the Chavacano written language. These sounds are mostly in words of Philippine and foreign origin. Furthermore, the pronunciation of some words of Spanish origin have become distorted or Philippinized in modern Chavacano. Some vowels have become allophonized ('e' and 'o' becomes 'i' and 'u' in some words) and some consonants have changed their pronunciation. (i.e. escoger became iscují in informal speech; tiene /tʃɛnɛ/; Dios /dʒɔs/; Castilla became /kastilla/ instead of /kastiʎa/).

Glottal stops, as in Filipino languages, are not also indicated (â, ê, î, ô, û). These sounds are mainly found in words of Philippine origin and are only indicated in dictionaries (i.e. jendê = not; olê = again) and when they are, the circumflex accent is used.

Other pronunciation changes in some words of Spanish origin include:

f ~ /p/
j, g (before 'e' and 'i') ~ /h/ (in common with dialects of Caribbean and other areas of Latin America and southern Spain)
ch ~ /ts/
rr ~ /xr/
di, de ~ /dʒ/ (when followed or preceded by other vowels: Dios ~ /jos/; dejalo ~ /jalo/)
ti, te ~ /tʃ/ (when followed or preceded by other vowels: tierra ~ /chehra/; tiene ~ /chene/)
ci, si ~ /ʃ/ (when followed or preceded by other vowels: conciencia ~ /konʃenʃa/)

/b, d, ɡ/, which are pronounced as fricatives in other Spanish dialects when between vowels, are uniformly pronounced as stops in Chavacano.

=== Other sounds ===
-h /h/ (glottal fricative in the final position); sometimes not written
-g /k/; sometimes written as just -k
-d /t/; sometimes written as just -t
-kh [x]; only in loanwords of Arabic origin, mostly Islamic terms

=== Sounds from English ===
“v” pronounced as English “v” (like: vase) (vi)
“z” pronounced as English “z” (like: zebra) (zi)
“x” pronounced as English “x” (like: X-ray) (ex/eks)
“h” like: house (/eitsh/); sometimes written as 'j'

=== Diphthongs ===
| Letters | Pronunciation | Example | Significant |
|---|---|---|---|
| ae | aye | caé | fall, to fall |
| ai | ay | caido | fallen, fell |
| ao | aow | cuidao | take care, cared |
| ea | eya | patéa | kick, to kick |
| ei | ey | reí | laugh |
| eo | eyo | vídeo | video |
| ia | ya | advertencia | warning, notice |
| ie | ye | cien(to) | one hundred, hundred |
| io | yo | canción | song |
| iu | yu | saciút | to move the hips a little |
| uo | ow | institutuo | institute |
| qu | ke | qué, que | what, that, than |
| gu | strong g | guía | to guide, guide |
| ua | wa | agua | water |
| ue | we | cuento | story |
| ui | wi | cuidá | care, to take care |
| oi | oy | oí | hear, to hear |

== Grammar ==
=== Simple sentence structure (verb–subject–object word order) ===
Chavacano is a language with the verb–subject–object sentence order. This is because it follows the Hiligaynon or Tagalog grammatical structures. However, the subject–verb–object order does exist in Chavacano but only for emphasis purposes (see below). New generations have been slowly and vigorously using the S-V-O pattern mainly because of the influence of the English language. These recent practices have been most prevalent and evident in the mass media particularly among Chavacano newswriters who translate news leads from English or Tagalog to Chavacano where the "who" is emphasized more than the "what". Because the mass media represent "legitimacy", it is understood by Chavacano speakers (particularly Zamboangueños) that the S-V-O sentence structure used by Chavacano journalists is standardized.

==== Declarative affirmative sentences in the simple present, past, and future tenses ====
Chavacano generally follows the simple verb–subject–object or verb–object–subject sentence structure typical of Hiligaynon or Tagalog in declarative affirmative sentences:

Ta comprá (verb) el maga/mana negociante (subject) con el tierra (object).
Ta comprá (verb) tierra (object) el maga/mana negociante (subject).

Hiligaynon: Nagabakal (verb) ang mga manogbaligya (subject) sang duta (object).
Hiligaynon: Nagabakal (verb) sang duta (object) ang mga manogbaligya (subject).
Tagalog: Bumibili (verb) ang mga negosyante (subject) ng lupa (object).
Tagalog: Bumibili (verb) ng lupa (object) ang mga negosyante (subject).

(‘The businessmen are buying land.’)

The subject always appears after the verb, and in cases where pronominal subjects (such as personal pronouns) are used in sentences, they will never occur before the verb:

Ya andá yo na iglesia enantes.

(‘I went to church a while ago.’)

==== Declarative negative sentences in the simple present, past, and future tenses ====
When the predicate of the sentence is negated, Chavacano uses the words hindê (from Tagalog ’hindi’ or Hiligaynon 'indi' which means ’no’; the Cebuano uses 'dili', which shows its remoteness from Chavacano as compared to Hiligaynon) to negate the verb in the present tense, no hay (which literally means ’none’) to negate the verb that was supposed to happen in the past, and hindê or nunca (which means ’no’ or ’never’) to negate the verb that will not or will never happen in the future respectively. This manner of negating the predicate always happens in the verb–subject–object or verb–object–subject sentence structure:

Present Tense

Hindê ta comprá (verb) el maga/mana negociante (subject) con el tierra (object).
Hindê ta comprá (verb) tierra (object) el maga/mana negociante (subject).

(Eng: The businessmen are not buying land. Span: Los hombres de negocios no están comprando tierras)

Past Tense

No hay comprá (verb) el maga/mana negociante (subject) con el tierra (object).
No hay comprá (verb) tierra (object) el maga/mana negociante (subject).

(Eng: The businessmen did not buy land. Span: Los hombres de negocios no compraron tierras)

Future Tense

Ay hindê comprá (verb) el maga/mana negociante (subject) con el tierra (object).
Ay hindê comprá (verb) tierra (object) el maga/mana negociante (subject).

(Eng: The businessmen will not buy land. Span: Los hombres de negocios no comprarán tierras)

Nunca ay/Ay nunca comprá (verb) el maga/mana negociante (subject) con el tierra (object).
Nunca ay/Ay nunca comprá (verb) tierra (object) el maga/mana negociante (subject).

(Eng: The businessmen will never buy land. Span: Los hombres de negocios nunca comprarán tierras)

The negator hindê can appear before the subject in a subject–verb–object structure to negate the subject rather than the predicate in the present, past, and future tenses:

Present Tense

Hindê el maga/mana negociante (subject) ta comprá (verb) con el tierra (object) sino el maga/mana empleados.

(Eng: It is not the businessmen who are buying land but the employees. Span: No son los hombres de negocios los que están comprando tierras, sino los empleados)

Past Tense

Hindê el maga/mana negociante (subject) ya comprá (verb) con el tierra (object) sino el maga/mana empleados.

(Eng: It was not the businessmen who bought the land but the employees. Span: No fueron los hombres de negocio los que compraron tierras, sino los empleados)

Future Tense

Hindê el maga/mana negociante (subject) ay comprá (verb) con el tierra (object) sino el maga/mana empleados.
Ay hindê comprá (verb) el maga/mana negociante(s) (subject) con el tierra (object) sino el maga/mana empleados.

(Eng: It will not be the businessmen who will buy land but the employees. Span: No serán los hombres de negocios los que compren tierras, sino los empleados)

The negator nunca can appear before the subject in a subject–verb–object structure to strongly negate (or denote impossibility) the subject rather than the predicate in the future tense:

Future Tense

Nunca el maga/mana negociante (subject) ay comprá (verb) con el tierra (object) sino el maga/mana empleados.
Nunca ay comprá (verb) el mana/maga negociante (subject) con el tierra (object) sino el maga/mana empleados.

(Eng: It will never be the businessmen who will buy land but the employees. Span: Nunca serán los hombres de negocios los que compren tierras, sino los empleados)

The negator no hay and nunca can also appear before the subject to negate the predicate in a subject–verb–object structure in the past and future tenses respectively. Using nunca before the subject to negate the predicate in a subject–verb–object structure denotes strong negation or impossibility for the subject to perform the action in the future:

Past Tense

No hay el maga/mana negociante (subject) comprá (verb) con el tierra (object).

(Eng: The businessmen did not buy land. Span: Los hombres de negocios no compraron tierras)

Future Tense

Nunca el maga/mana negociante (subject) ay comprá (verb) con el tierra (object).

(Eng: The businessmen will never buy land. Span: Los hombres de negocios nunca comprarán tierras)

=== Nouns and articles ===
The Chavacano definite article el precedes a singular noun or a plural marker (for a plural noun). The indefinite article un stays constant for gender as 'una' has almost completely disappeared in Chavacano, except for some phrases like "una vez". It also stays constant for number as for singular nouns. In Chavacano, it is quite common for el and un to appear together before a singular noun, the former to denote certainty and the latter to denote number:

el cajón (’the box’) – el maga/mana cajón(es) (’the boxes’)
un soltero (’a bachelor’) – un soltera (’a spinster’)
el un soltero (’the bachelor’) – el un soltera (’the spinster’)

Nouns in Chavacano are not always preceded by articles. Without an article, a noun is a generic reference:

Hindê yo ta llorá lagrimas sino sangre.

(’I do not cry tears but blood’.)

Ta cargá yo palo.

(’I am carrying wood’).

Proper names of persons are preceded by the definite article si or the phrase un tal functioning as an indefinite article would:

Un bonita candidata si Maria..

(’Maria is a beautiful candidate’.)

un tal Juancho

(’a certain Juancho’)

==== Singular nouns ====
Unlike in Spanish, Chavacano nouns derived from Spanish do not follow gender rules in general. In Zamboangueño, the article 'el' basically precedes every singular noun. However, this rule is not rigid (especially in Zamboangueño) because the formal vocabulary mode wherein Spanish words predominate almost always is the preferred mode especially in writing. The Spanish article 'la' for feminine singular nouns does exist in Chavacano, though it occurs rarely and mostly in the formal medium of writing, such as poems and lyrics. When accompanying a Spanish feminine noun, the 'la' as the article is more tolerated than acceptable. Among the few exceptions where the 'la' occurs is as a formal prefix when addressing the Blessed Virgin Mary, perhaps more as an emphasis of her importance in Christian devotion. But the real article is still the 'el', which makes this use of a "double article" quite unique. Thus it is common to hear the Blessed Virgin addressed in Chavacano as 'el La Virgen Maria' (the "L" of the 'la' capitalized to signify its permanent position within the noun compound). In general, though, when in doubt, the article 'el' is always safe to use. Compare:

| English singular noun | Chavacano singular noun (general and common) | Chavacano singular noun (accepted or uncommon) |
|---|---|---|
| the virgin | el virgen | la virgen (accepted) |
| the peace | el paz | la paz (accepted) |
| the sea | el mar | la mar (accepted) |
| the cat | el gato | el gato (la gata is uncommon) |
| the sun | el sol | el sol |
| the moon | el luna | el luna (la luna is uncommon) |
| the view | el vista | la vista (accepted) |
| the tragedy | el tragedia | el tragedia (la tragedia is uncommon) |
| the doctor | el doctor | el doctora (la doctora is uncommon) |

And just like Spanish, Chavacano nouns can have gender but only when referring to persons. However, they are always masculine in the sense (Spanish context) that they are generally preceded by the article 'el'. Places and things are almost always masculine. The -o is dropped in masculine nouns and -a is added to make the noun feminine:

| English singular noun | Chavacano singular noun (masculine) | Chavacano singular noun (feminine) |
|---|---|---|
| the teacher | el maestro | el maestra |
| the witch | el burujo | el buruja |
| the engineer | el engeniero | el engeniera |
| the tailor/seamstress | el sastrero | el sastrera |
| the baby | el niño | el niña |
| the priest/nun | el padre/sacerdote | el madre/monja |
| the grandson/granddaughter | el nieto | el nieta |
| the professor | el profesor | el profesora |
| the councilor | el consejal | el consejala |

Not all nouns referring to persons can become feminine nouns. In Chavacano, some names of persons are masculine (because of the preceding article 'el' in Spanish context) but do not end in -o.

Examples: el alcalde, el capitan, el negociante, el ayudante, el chufer

All names of animals are always masculine—in Spanish context—preceded by the article 'el'.

Examples: el gato (gata is uncommon), el puerco (puerca is uncommon), el perro (perra is uncommon)

Names of places and things can be either masculine or feminine, but they are considered masculine in the Spanish context because the article 'el' always precedes the noun:

el cocina, el pantalón, el comida, el camino, el trapo, el ventana, el mar

==== Plural nouns ====
In Chavacano, plural nouns (whether masculine or feminine in Spanish context) are preceded by the retained singular masculine Spanish article 'el'. The Spanish articles 'los' and 'las' have almost disappeared. They have been replaced by the modifier (a plural marker) 'maga/mana' which precedes the singular form of the noun. Maga comes from the native Hiligaynon 'maga' or the Tagalog 'mga'. The formation of the Chavacano plural form of the noun (el + maga/mana + singular noun form) applies whether in common, familiar or formal mode. It may be thought of as roughly equivalent to saying in English, "the many (noun)" instead of "the (noun)s", and in fact "the many (noun)s" is used more in Philippine English than elsewhere.

There are some Chavacano speakers (especially older Caviteño or Zamboangueño speakers) who would tend to say 'mana' for 'maga'. 'Mana' is accepted and quite common, especially among older speakers, but when in doubt, the modifier 'maga' to pluralize nouns is safer to use.

| English plural noun | Chavacano plural noun (masculine) | Chavacano plural noun (feminine) |
|---|---|---|
| the teachers | el maga/mana maestro(s) | el maga/mana maestra(s) |
| the witches | el maga/mana burujo(s) | el maga/mana buruja(s) |
| the engineers | el maga/mana engeniero(s) | el maga/mana engeniera(s) |
| the tailors/seamstresses | el maga/mana sastrero(s) | el maga/mana sastrera(s) |
| the babies | el maga/mana niño(s) | el maga/mana niña(s) |
| the priests/nuns | el maga/mana padre(s) | el maga/mana madre(s) |
| the grandsons/granddaughters | el maga/mana nieto(s) | el maga/mana nieta(s) |
| the professors | el maga/mana professor(es) | el maga/mana profesora(s) |
| the councilors | el maga/mana consejal(es) | el maga/mana consejala(s) |

Again, this rule is not rigid (especially in the Zamboangueño formal mode). The articles 'los' or 'las' do exist sometimes before nouns that are pluralized in the Spanish manner, and their use is quite accepted:

los caballeros, los dias, las noches, los chavacanos, los santos, las mañanas, las almujadas, las mesas, las plumas, las cosas

When in doubt, it is always safe to use 'el' and 'maga or mana' to pluralize singular nouns:

el maga/mana caballero(s), el maga/mana día(s), el maga/mana noche(s), el maga/mana chavacano(s), el maga/mana santo(s), el maga/mana día(s) que viene (this is a phrase; 'el maga/mana mañana' is uncommon), el maga/mana almujada(s), el maga/mana mesa(s), el maga/mana pluma(s)

In Chavacano, it is common for some nouns to become doubled when pluralized (called Reduplication, a characteristic of the Malayo-Polynesian family of languages):

el maga cosa-cosa (el maga cosa/s is common), el maga casa casa (el maga casa is common), el maga gente gente (el maga gente is common), el maga juego juego (el maga juego is common)

But note that in some cases, this "reduplication" signifies a difference in meaning. For example, 'el maga bata' means 'the children' but 'el maga bata-bata' means one's followers or subordinates, as is a gang or mob.

In general, the suffixes -s, -as, -os to pluralize nouns in Spanish have also almost disappeared in Chavacano. However, the formation of plural nouns with suffixes ending in -s, -as, and -os are accepted. Basically, the singular form of the noun is retained, and it becomes plural because of the preceding modifier/plural marker 'maga' or 'mana':

el maga/mana caballeros (accepted)
el maga/mana caballero (correct)
el maga/mana días (accepted)
el maga/mana día (correct)

Adding the suffix -es to some nouns is quite common and accepted. Nouns ending in -cion can also be pluralized by adding the suffix -es:

el maga meses, el maga mujeres, el maga mayores, el maga tentaciones, el maga contestaciones, el maga naciones, el maga organizaciones

However, it is safer to use the general rule (when in doubt) of retaining the singular form of the noun preceded by the modifier/plural marker 'maga' or 'mana':

el maga mes, el maga mujer, el maga mayor, el maga tentación, el maga contestación, el maga nación, el maga organización

=== Pronouns ===
Chavacano pronouns are based on Spanish and native sources; many of the pronouns are not used in either but may be derived in part.

In contrast to the other varieties of Chavacano, the variety spoken in Zamboanga uses more pronouns derived from a native Philippine language (I.e. Hiligaynon) in addition to Spanish. In Zamboangueño, there are three different levels of usage for certain pronouns depending on the level of familiarity between the speaker and the addressee, the status of both in family and society, or the mood of the speaker and addressee at the particular moment: common, familiar, and formal. The common forms are, particularly in the second and third person plural, derived from Cebuano while most familiar and formal forms are from Spanish. The common forms are used to address a person below or of equal social or family status or to someone is who is acquainted. The common forms are used to regard no formality or courtesy in conversation. Its use can also mean rudeness, impoliteness or offensiveness. The familiar forms are used to address someone of equal social or family status. It indicates courteousness, and is commonly used in public conversations, the broadcast media, and in education. The formal forms are used to address someone older and/or higher in social or family status. It is the form used in writing.

Additionally, Zamboangueño is the only variety of Chavacano which distinguishes between the inclusive we (kita) – including the person spoken to (the addressee) – and the exclusive we (kame) – excluding the person spoken to (the addressee) – in the first person plural except in the formal form where nosotros is used for both.

==== Personal (nominative/subjective case) pronouns ====
Below is a table comparing the personal pronouns in three varieties of Chavacano.

| | Zamboangueño | Caviteño | Bahra | Castellano Abakay (de Davao) |
|---|---|---|---|---|
| 1st person singular | yo | yo | | yo (Chino, Japón) ako (Chino) |
| 2nd person singular | [e]vo[s] (common)/(informal) tú (familiar) usted (formal) | vo/bo tu usté | vo/bo usté | usted vos |
| 3rd person singular | él ele | eli | | él |
| 1st person plural | kamé (exclusive/common/familiar) kitá (inclusive/common/familiar) nosotros (formal) | nisos | mijotro mihotro motro | nosotros (Chino, Japón) |
| 2nd person plural | kamó (common) vosotros (familiar) ustedes (formal) | vusos busos | buhotro bujotro ustedi tedi | ustedes vosotros |
| 3rd person plural | silá (common/familiar) ellos (formal) | ilos | lojotro lohotro lotro | ellos |

==== Possessive pronouns (Zamboangueño Chavacano, Castellano Abakay) ====
The usage modes also exist in the possessive pronouns especially in Zamboangueño. Amon, aton, ila and inyo are obviously of Hiligaynon but not Cebuano origins, and when used as pronouns, they are of either the common or familiar mode. The inclusive and exclusive characteristics peculiar to Zamboangueño appear again in the 1st person plural. Below is a table of the possessive pronouns in the Chavacano de Zamboanga:

| | Zamboangueño | Castellano Abakay (de Davao) |
|---|---|---|
| 1st person singular | mi mío de mi de mío di mio/di mío | mi mío |
| 2nd person singular | de vos (common) de tu (familiar) tuyo (familiar) de tuyo/di tuyo (familiar) de usted (formal) | de tu |
| 3rd person singular | su suyo de su de suyo/di suyo | ese (Chino, Japón) de iya (Chino) |
| 1st person plural | de amón/diamon (common/familiar) (exclusive) de atón/diaton (common/familiar) (inclusive) nuestro (formal) de/di nuestro (formal) | nuestro |
| 2nd person plural | de iño/di inyo (common) de vosotros (familiar) de ustedes (formal) | vos |
| 3rd person plural | de ila (common/familiar) de ellos/di ellos (formal) | de ellos |

=== Verbs ===
In Zamboangueño, Chavacano verbs are mostly Spanish in origin. In contrast with the other varieties, there is rarely a Zamboangueño verb that is based on or has its origin from other Philippine languages. Hence, verbs contribute much of the Spanish vocabulary in Chavacano de Zamboanga.

Generally, the simple form of the Zamboangueño verb is based upon the infinitive of the Spanish verb, minus the final /r/. For example, continuar, hablar, poner, recibir, and llevar become continuá, hablá, poné, recibí, and llevá with the accent called "acento agudo" on the final syllable.

There are some rare exceptions. Some verbs are not derived from infinitives but from words that are technically Spanish phrases or from other Spanish verbs. For example, dar (give) does not become 'da' but dale (give) (literally in Spanish, to "give it" [verb phrase]). In this case, dale has nothing to do with the Spanish infinitive dar. The Chavacano brinca (to hop) is from Spanish brincar which means the same thing.

==== Verb tenses – simple tenses ====
Chavacano of Zamboangueño uses the words ya (from Spanish ya [already]), ta (from Spanish está [is]), and ay plus the simple form of the verb to convey the basic tenses of past, present, and future respectively:

| English infinitive | Spanish infinitive | Zamboangueño infinitive | Past tense | Present tense | Future tense |
|---|---|---|---|---|---|
| to sing | cantar | cantá | ya cantá | ta cantá | ay cantá |
| to drink | beber | bebé | ya bebé | ta bebé | ay bebé |
| to sleep | dormir | dormí | ya dormí | ta dormí | ay dormí |
| to ask (of something) | pedir | pedí | ya pedí | ta pedí | ay pedí |

Caviteño uses the words ya, ta, and di plus the simple form of the verb to convey the basic tenses of past, present, and future respectively:

| English infinitive | Spanish infinitive | Caviteño infinitive | Past tense | Present tense | Future tense |
|---|---|---|---|---|---|
| to sing | cantar | cantá | ya cantá | ta cantá | di cantá |
| to drink | beber | bebé | ya bebé | ta bebé | di bebé |
| to sleep | dormir | dormí | ya dormí | ta dormí | di dormí |
| to ask (of something) | pedir | pedí | ya pedí | ta pedí | di pedí |

While Bahra uses the words a, ta, and di plus the simple form of the verb to convey the basic tenses of past, present, and future respectively:

| English infinitive | Spanish infinitive | Bahra ininitive | Past tense | Present tense | Future tense |
|---|---|---|---|---|---|
| to sing | cantar | cantá | a cantá | ta cantá | di cantá |
| to drink | beber | bebé | a bebé | ta bebé | di bebé |
| to sleep | dormir | dormí | a dormí | ta dormí | di dormí |
| to ask (of something) | pedir | pedí | a pedí | ta pedí | di pedí |

Unlike in the Zamboangueño, Caviteño, and Bahra, Castellano Abakay (Davaoeño) doesn't have the ya and ta prefix. The infinitives and their conjugations are somehow retained, and there are some that have simplified conjugations:

| English infinitive | Spanish infinitive | Castellano Abakay infinitive | Past tense | Present tense | Future tense |
|---|---|---|---|---|---|
| to sing | cantar | cantar | cantó | canta | cantá |
| to drink | beber | beber | bibío | bebe | bebé |
| to sleep | dormir | dormir | durmió | duerme | dormí |
| to ask (of something) | pedir | pedir | pidió | pide | pedí |

===== Perfect constructions =====
In Zamboangueño, there are three ways to express that the verb is in the present perfect. First, ya can appear both before and after the main verb to express that in the present perspective, the action has already been completed somewhere in the past with the accent falling on the final ya. Second, ta and ya can appear before and after the verb respectively to express that the action was expected to happen in the past (but did not happen), is still expected to happen in the present, and actually the expectation has been met (the verb occurs in the present). And third, a verb between ta and pa means an action started in the past and still continues in the present:

| Zamboangueño past perfect | Zamboangueño present perfect | Zamboangueño future perfect |
|---|---|---|
| ya cantá ya. | ta cantá pa. / ta canta ya. | ay cantá ya. |
| ya bebé ya. | ta bebé pa. / ta bebe ya. | ay bebé ya. |
| ya dormí ya. | ta dormí pa. / ta dormi ya. | ay dormí ya. |
| ya pedí ya. | ya pedí pa. / ya pedí ya. | ay pedí ya. |

The past perfect exists in Zamboangueño. The words antes (before) and despues (after) can be used between two sentences in the simple past form to show which verb came first. The words antes (before) and despues (after) can also be used between a sentence in the present perfect using ya + verb + ya and another sentence in the simple past tense:

| Past perfect (Zamboangueño) | Past perfect (English) |
|---|---|
| Ya mirá kame el película antes de ya comprá con el maga chichirías. | We had watched the movie before we bought the snacks. |

| Past perfect (Zamboangueño) | Past perfect (English) |
|---|---|
| Ya mirá ya kame el película después ya comprá kame con el maga chichirías. | We had watched the movie and then we bought the snacks. |

Zamboangueño Chavacano uses a verb between "hay" and "ya" to denote the future perfect and past perfect respectively:

| Future perfect (Zamboangueño) | Future perfect (English) |
|---|---|
| Hay mirá ya kame el película si hay llegá vosotros. | We will have watched the movie when you arrive. |

Zamboangueño Chavacano also uses a verb between "ta" and "ya" to denote the present perfect:

| Present perfect (Zamboangueño) | Present perfect (English) |
|---|---|
| Ta mirá ya kame con el película mientras ta esperá con vosotros. | We are already watching the movie while waiting for you. |

==== Passive and active voice ====
To form the Zamboangueño Chavacano active voice, Zamboangueños follow the pattern:

El maga soldao ya mata con el criminal The soldiers killed the criminal.

As illustrated above, active (causative) voice is formed by placing the doer el maga soldao before the verb phrase ya mata and then the object el criminal as indicated by the particle con

Traditionally, Zamboangueño does not have a passive construction of its own.

== Archaic Spanish words and false friends ==
Chabacano has preserved many archaic Spanish phrases and words in its vocabulary that modern Spanish no longer uses; for example:

- "En denantes" which means 'a while ago' (Spanish: "hace un tiempo"). This word is still used in some areas of southern Spain.
- "Masquen"/"Masquin" means 'even (if)' or 'although'. In Spanish, "mas que" is a somewhat out of fashion Spanish phrase meaning 'although'; nowadays, it is replaced by the Spanish word "aunque" most of the time.
- In Chavacano, the Spanish language is commonly called "castellano". Chavacano speakers, especially older Zamboangueños, call the language "castellano", implying the original notion of it as the language of Castille, while "español" is used to mean a Spaniard or a person from Spain.
- The formal second-person pronoun "vos" is still in use in Chavacano. While "vos" was used in the highest form of respect before the 16th century in classical Spanish, and is uncommon in modern Spanish (much like the English "thou"), in Chavacano it is used at the common level of usage (lower than "tu", which is used at the familiar level). This is the same usage as in the works of Miguel de Cervantes; likewise, certain Latin American countries such as Argentina use "vos" informally, in contrast with "usted", which is used formally. Chavacano followed the development of "vos" in same manner as in Latin America – (the voseo).
- "Ansina" means 'like that' or 'that way'. In modern Spanish, "así" is the evolved form of this archaic word. The word "ansina" can still be heard among the aged in Mexico and is the only way of expressing this meaning in Ladino.

On the other hand, some words from the language spoken in Spain have evolved or have acquired totally different meanings in Chavacano. Hence, for Castilian speakers who would encounter Chavacano speakers, some words familiar to them have become false friends. For example:

- "Siguro"/"Seguro" means 'maybe' in Chavacano. In Spanish, "seguro" usually means 'sure', 'secure', or 'stable'; although, it could imply probability as well, as in the phrase, "Seguramente vendrá" ("Probably he will come").
- "Siempre" means 'of course'. In Spanish, "siempre" means 'always'.
- "Firmi" means 'always'. In Spanish, "firme" means 'firm' or 'steady'.

== See also ==
- Philippine Spanish
- Portugis, extinct Portuguese-Malay creole language from Ternate and Ambon
- Spanish Filipino
- Spanish-based creole languages
- Spanish East Indies
- Hispanic
- Chavacano Wikipedia

== Bibliography ==
- Brooks, John (1 January 1933). "Más que, mas que and mas ¡qué!". Hispania. 16 (1): 23–34. doi:10.2307/332588. ISSN 0018-2133. JSTOR 332588.
- Castillo, Edwin Gabriel Ma., S.J. "Glosario Liturgico: Liturgical Literacy in the Chavacano de Zamboanga",(Unpublished) Archdiocese of Zamboanga.
- Chambers, John; Wee, Salvador, eds. (2003). English-Chabacano Dictionary. Ateneo de Zamboanga University Press.
- Holm, J. A. (1988). "Pidgins and creoles" (Vols. 1–2). Cambridge: Cambridge University Press.
- McKaughan, Howard P. (1954). "Notes on Chabacano grammar". Journal of East Asiatic Studies. 3: 205–226.
- Michaelis, Susanne, ed. (2008). Roots of Creole Structures: Weighing the contribution of substrates and superstrates. Creole Language Library. Vol. 33. Amsterdam: John Benjamins Publishing. doi:10.1075/cll.33. hdl:10197/6022. ISBN 978-90-272-5255-5. ISSN 0920-9026. LCCN 2008019875.
- Rubino, Carl (2008). "12. Zamboangueño Chavacano and the potentive mode". In Michaelis, Susanne (ed.). Roots of Creole Structures: Weighing the contribution of substrates and superstrates. Creole Language Library. Vol. 33. Amsterdam: John Benjamins Publishing. pp. 279–299. doi:10.1075/cll.33.15rub. ISBN 978-90-272-5255-5. ISSN 0920-9026.
- Steinkrüger, Patrick O. (2007). "Notes on Ternateño (A Philippine Spanish Creole)". Journal of Pidgin and Creole Languages. 22 (2): 367–378. doi:10.1075/jpcl.22.2.10ste. ISSN 0920-9034.
- Whinnom, Keith. Spanish contact vernaculars in the Philippine Islands. Hong Kong University Press. ISBN 9780608137933.
- Forman, Michael Lawrence (1972). Zamboangueño texts with grammatical analysis. A Study of Philippine Creole Spanish (PH D Dissertation, Cornell University). Ithaca, NY: Cornell University.
- Sippola, E. (2011-12-09). Una gramática descriptiva del chabacano de Ternate (PDF) (Doctoral dissertation (monograph)) (in Spanish). University of Helsinki. hdl:0138/28255. ISBN 978-952-10-7327-4.
- Lesho, Marivic (2013). The sociophonetics and phonology of the Cavite Chabacano vowel system (Ohio State University dissertation). Columbus, OH: The Ohio State University.
- Zamboangueño Chavacano por Jose Genaro Ruste Yap – Aizon, Ph.D.:

(http://www.evri.com/media/article;jsessionid=ud7mj8tleegi?title=Home+|+Zamboanga+ChavacanoZamboanga+Chavacano+|+by+Jose+Genaro+...&page=http://www.josegenaroyapaizon.com/&referring_uri=/location/chavacano-language-0x398c30%3Bjsessionid%3Dud7mj8tleegi&referring_title=Evri)
