= Tukuran =

Municipality in Zamboanga del Sur, Philippines

- Municipality
- Municipality of Tukuran
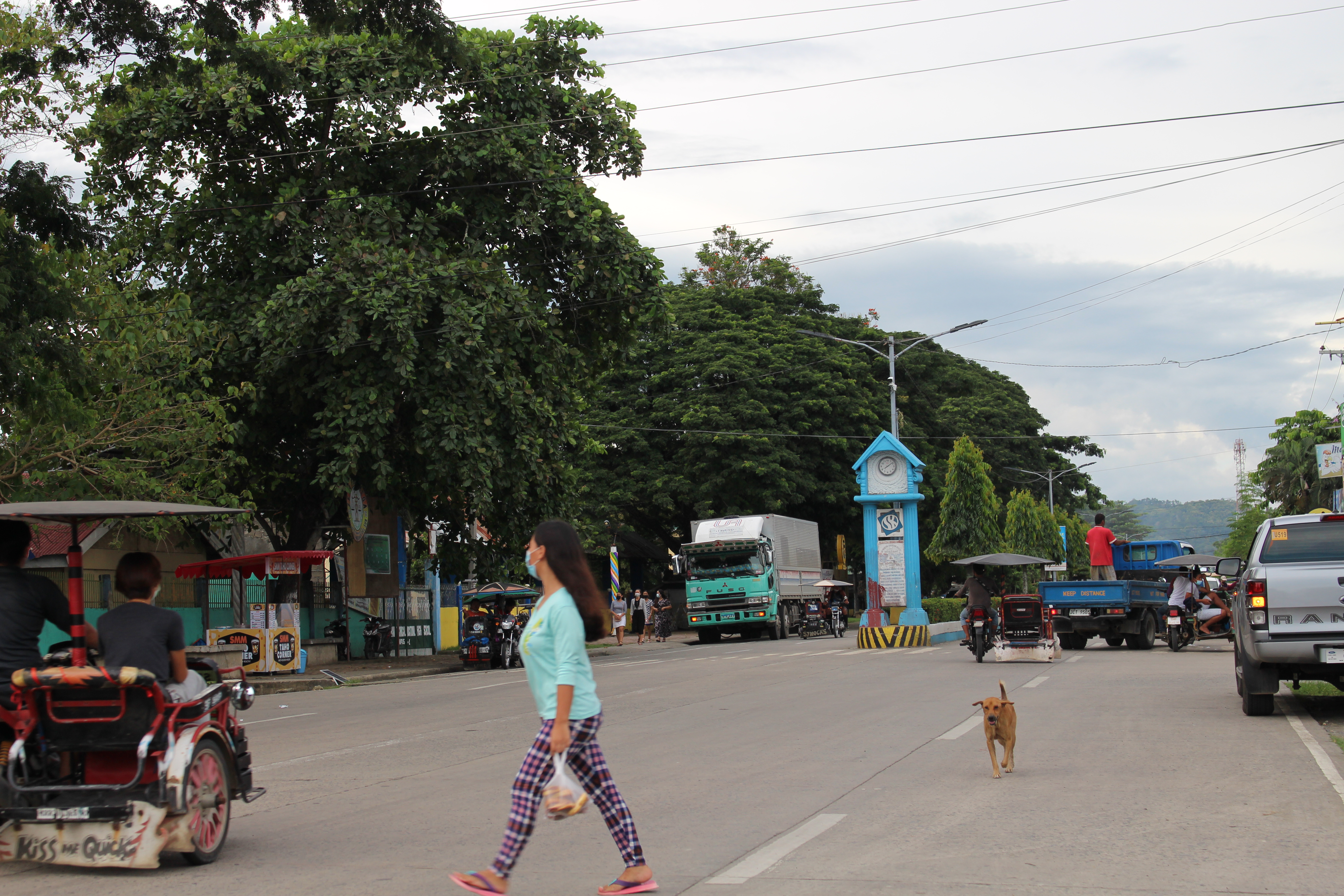
- Poblacion of Tukuran

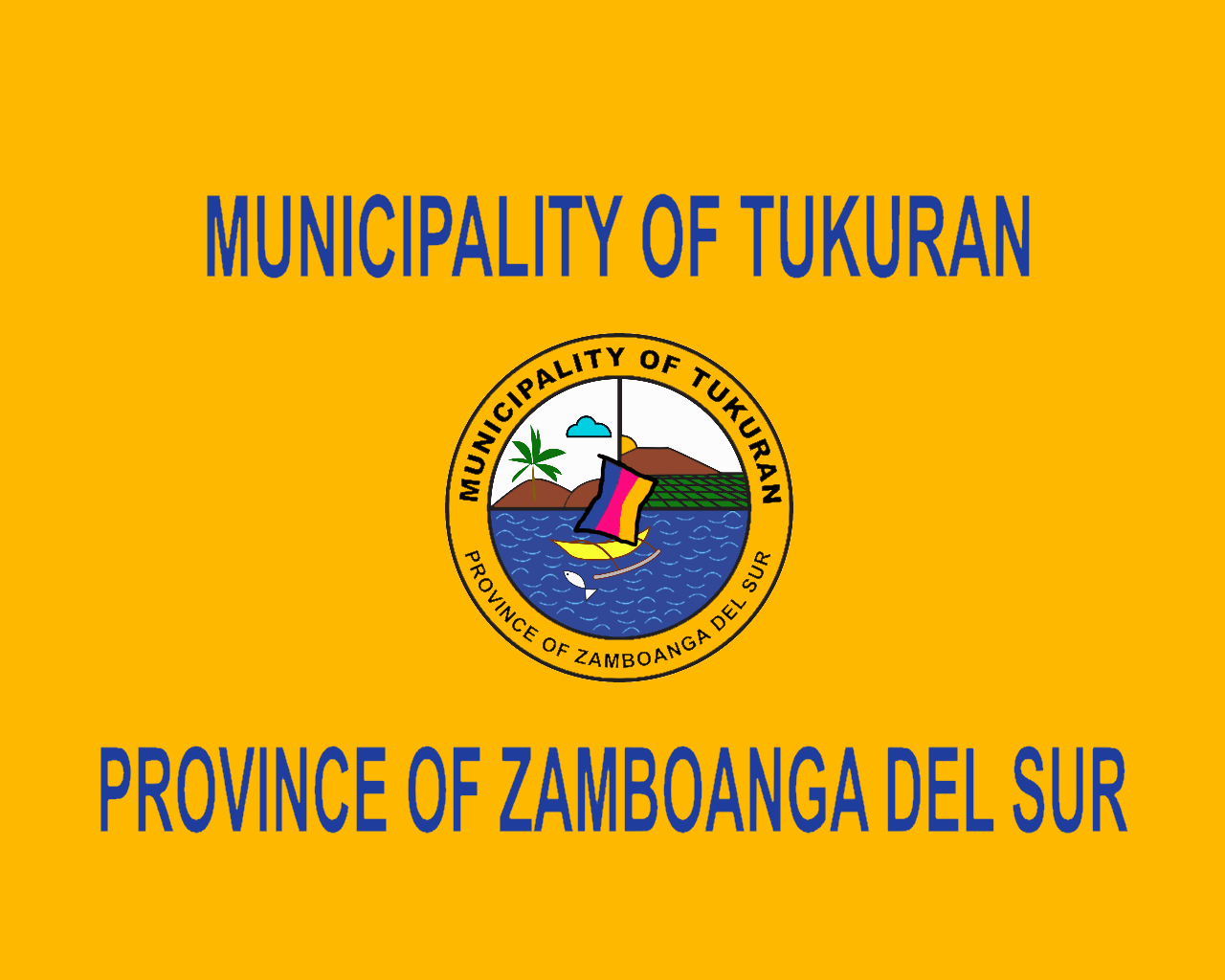
- Flag Seal
- Nickname: Swimming Capital of Zamboanga del Sur
- Motto: Lihok Tukuranon!
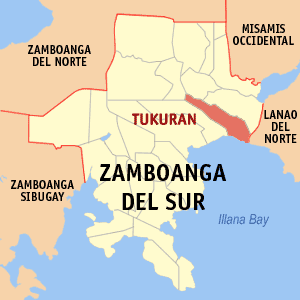
- Map of Zamboanga del Sur with Tukuran highlighted
- Interactive map of Tukuran
- Location within the Philippines
- Coordinates: 7°51′17″N 123°34′42″E
- Country: Philippines
- Region: Zamboanga Peninsula
- Province: Zamboanga del Sur
- District: 1st district
- Founded: November 29, 1958
- Barangays: 25 (see Barangays)

Government
  - Type: Sangguniang Bayan
  - Mayor: Macario V. Tingson
  - Vice Mayor: Delfina S. Cortina
  - Representative: Divina Grace C. Yu
  - Municipal Council: Members: Rolly S. Cortina; Elinore V. Chua; Jocyl Faith C. Vega; Macario B. Tutor Jr.; Benjamin A. de Jesus; Bobby H. Mamentong; Sukarno M. Mamasalagat; Victoria G. Pintac
  - Electorate: 28,987 voters (2025)

Area
  - Total: 144.91 km^{2} (55.95 sq mi)
- Elevation: 37 m (121 ft)
- Highest elevation: 319 m (1,047 ft)
- Lowest elevation: 0 m (0 ft)

Population (2024 census)
  - Total: 42,683
  - Density: 294.55/km^{2} (762.88/sq mi)
  - Households: 9,941

Economy
  - Income class: 2nd municipal income class
  - Poverty incidence: 28.69% (2023)
  - Revenue: ₱ 207.4 million (2024)
  - Assets: ₱ 773.1 million (2024)
  - Expenditure: ₱ 59.29 million (2024)
  - Liabilities: ₱ 250.5 million (2024)

Service provider
  - Electricity: Zamboanga del Sur 1 Electric Cooperative (ZAMSURECO 1)
- Time zone: UTC+8 (PST)
- ZIP code: 7019
- PSGC: 0907330000
- IDD : area code: +63 (0)62
- Native languages: Subanon; Cebuano; Chavacano; Tagalog; Iranun; Maranao
- Website: www.tukuran.com.ph

Tukuran, officially the Municipality of Tukuran (Cebuano: Lungsod sa Tukuran; Subanen: Benwa Tukuran; Iranun and Maranao: Inged a Tukudan; Chavacano: Municipalidad de Tukuran; Tagalog: Bayan ng Tukuran), is a municipality in the province of Zamboanga del Sur, Philippines. According to the 2024 census, it has a population of 42,683 people.

Kargado, a movie starring Gardo Versoza, was shot in Tukuran at Tabak E Beach Resort (now E and D beach) in 1998 (circa).

== History ==
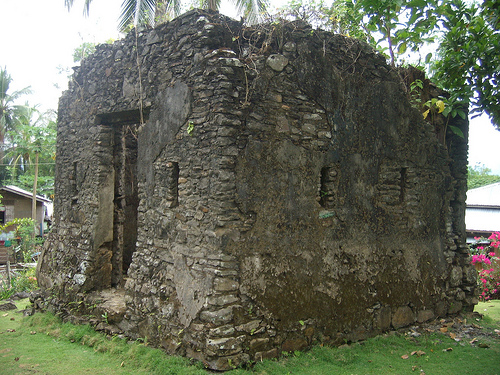
Old Spanish camp, Barangay Militar

Tukuran is derived from the word tukod meaning 'to build' or 'to construct'. Its original inhabitants were Subanons, Maranaons, Maguindanaons, and Iranuns.

Historically, Tukuran was a passing point of many merchants because of its location on the trade route. Merchants of different tribes regularly passed by the area, carrying with them their wares. These merchants usually came from the nearby provinces, most specifically, Zamboanga City and Southern Mindanao, as well as the places of Lanao and the Misamis region (Misamis Occidental and Misamis Oriental). When the Spaniards came, they tried to control the trade route, building the famous Fort Militar that overlooks Tukuran and the northern part of Illana Bay, as well as the so-called Spanish Trocha which then connected Tukuran directly to the regions of Lanao and Misamis. It came to be known as the Trocha de Tukuran (Trocha that means in Meranau Afta or Apazan).

Close to the end of the century, in 1899, the Muslims, under the leadership of Sultan Amay Untad Panduma, founded a settlement in Tukuran. They claimed to have come from the Iranon tribe. Since their number was large, they decided to divide themselves and settle in the neighboring sitios. Sultan Paduma's descendants succeeded him in ruling the group.

The first wave of Christian settlers followed a few years later, led by Feliz Ocampo, the grandfather of Felix Ocampo Sr. They hailed from far up north, in Manila. They chose to settle in the shores of Tukuran. They were later followed by the settlers from Pangasinan together with their families and farming equipment.

Before Tukuran became a municipality, it was a part of the municipality of Labangan, until November 29, 1958, when President Carlos P. Garcia, under the recommendation of the Zamboanga del Sur Provincial Board headed by Governor Bienvenido Ebarle, signed Executive Order No. 323 making Tukuran a municipality. The first municipal mayor appointed to head the municipality was Mayor Filomeno C. Villamero (who was then elected vice mayor of Labangan), with Sultan Mamadra Panduma as the vice mayor.

=== The Spanish period ===
An excerpt from the Treaty of Sultan Kudarat of Maguindanao and King Philip IV of Spain signed on June 24, 1645, proves that the place used to be vassalage of the Sultan of Maguindanao. Islam was the dominant religion of the land. There was no king to rule, nor there existed a single law signifying the rights and duties of the subjects. Each datu considered himself as the most outstanding and powerful chieftain of the place and yet he had no more loyal subjects than his relatives and slaves. According to Thomas Forrest in 1780 Tukuran is a place where Iranuns lived in, built and repaired prahus. There were several services conducted by Spaniards in the isthmus of Tukuran because of it being the strategic place for a Spanish stronghold and to shorten communication in the north of Pangil Bay to south of Illana Bay, as well. On March 12, 1890, a fortified station named after the member of the royal family fort Alfonso XII locally known as fort Militar was built to stop the Moro from their slave-raiding activities against the Subanu people to Christians, and to facilitate their pacification on Mindanao campaign of colonization in general. Governor General Valeriano Weyler proposed the construction of a canal across the isthmus. the plan, however, did not realize.

=== The American period and World War II liberation ===
Moro resistance on the hill of Tagulo, a sitio of Tukuran was pacified; the Moros were forced to abandon the place on October 15, 1900, and the place was occupied by American soldiers. In 1912, Tukuran was established as a military district and then became a municipal district in 1918 with a population of 3,921. Due to the ongoing piratical raids, the people transferred the seat of the government to Labangan in 1921; settlers began to arrive. As a result of the heavy influx of the settlers from Luzon and Visayas there was fragile co-existence among the indigenous Moro, Lumads and Christian populations. In Luy-a and Camanga, Subanens retreated to the hinterlands and the Iranun Muslims gradually transferred to Labangan. Moros from Kalibaw, Karumatan (municipality of Karomatan) continued to raid the town. With this marauding activity, the American soldiers' attention was divided. The beach (front and shell depot) played an important role as a landing site of series of landing of ammunitions from Australia to supply the Guerilla Movement in Mindanao. During the early days of resettlement, English was the lingua franca. The town fiesta was first celebrated in 1938 with San Isidro (Saint Isidore) as the patron.

The first contact with the Americans since World War II began was on March 5, 1943, when the US submarine Tambor passed by in Tukuran and distributed supplies. On board the submarine were Charles M. Smith and Commodore Charles Parson. These American officers informed Australia about the location of Tukuran as a good docking site. In the morning of January 25, 1945 at about 11:00 a US sea plane "Santa Catalina" landed on the beach to unload supplies. During liberation period, American planes in V-formation fly in the sky. Displaced Tukuranons returned home and started to fix their abandoned homes. Schools were reopened and life returned to normal.

=== Townhood and the 1960s ===
Mayor Filomino Villamero, the mayor of the town of Labangan considered the idea of making Tukuran a municipality by virtue of Executive Order 323 signed by his Excellency Carlos P. Garcia on November 29, 1958. Tukuran became a municipality. During the early 1960s many Tukuranons had experienced the abundance of the sea. Some of the family especially the taga-baybay, coastline dwellers found fortune in the fishing industry. Curvada was the trading center of Tukuran during this time. Lab-asiros (fish traders) have usually experienced difficulty in transporting the tuna to Curvada due to the sticky mud in going to Tukuran proper. This decade was considered by Tukuranons as the dawn of the fishing industry of the town.

The center of the trading is in Curvada (the present PNP visibility post). Cans from the shore to Curvada were manually handled and which contained fresh fish. The trading activity was very progressive. There were Chinese -Filipinos who once lived there but vanished later due to their superstitious beliefs that the town was not favorable for business. Lab-aseros(fish traders), had usually experienced a difficulty in transporting the tuna to Curvada due to its sticky muddy road going to the trading center. Lupoy, an ordinary fish during this time was even visible at Canawa creek during high tide, and even crabs and other marine creatures were of abundance. Trucks from Aurora stayed only at Curvada because of the poor road condition and only waited for the lab-aseros to come and sell.

=== The 1970s ===
This decade was characterized by military instability and natural calamities that affected the people's socio-economic activity.

Great Fire in Poblacion

On January 21, 1971, at about one o'clock after the stall keepers had taken their lunch a day on the festivity of Sr. Santo Niño of Pagadian, a great fire brought disaster on the first year of this decade. About a hundred houses and commercial establishments were burned down but luckily, no one was hurt. This caused an economic breakdown of the municipality as it was estimated to cost 2 million of the properties lost. Aid from the government through DSWD and some NGOs helped the townsfolk stand again from the ashes.

The Barracuda – Ilaga Conflict

Commander Toothpick, a Tiruray tribal warrior was known to fight against alleged Muslim terrorism and exploitation. It was this time that the term Ilaga was introduced into the vocabulary."Ilaga" means "rat" but Muslims of North Cotabato called it "Ilonggo Land Grabbing Association".The Ilaga was a Paramilitary Organization known for its anti-Muslim sentiments. It was composed initially, as reported in media, of some Ilonggo natives of Panay.

The physical pattern of events showed the spread of conflicts, from North Cotabato to Lanao del Sur, from Cotabato to Lanao del Norte, and from Cotabato to Zamboanga del Sur. Tukuran is the first coastal municipality from Lanao Sur in Illana Bay. The murder of Al Mirasan Tampogao, vice mayor of Carumatan, in Tukuran at Santo Niño, Tukuran is said to be one of catalyst of the Barracuda attacks in the area. The alleged assassin was a member of Ilaga, a group known for its anti-Muslim sentiments. After that incident, there had been fears of a Moro attack on the town to avenge the Vice Mayor's death. In May, the rebels in front of the burned Municipal hall of Labangan kidnapped Father O'Halpin, the parish priest of Tukuran, on his way back to the town, but he was released later. This related incident added to the suspicions that a conflict will soon come. At this time Labangan was in the hands of the Barracudas (black shirts). A suspected Barracuda attack on the town mayor's residence on the third week of April 1972 added to the tension between the two groups, although it was also suspected the attack was politically motivated. Consequently, the 29th IB, PA was able to intercept a message revealing that on July 27, 1973, there will be an attack on the town; the attack took place at early morning on the day before the set date, on the 26th.

Even though the 29th IB, Philippine Army had intercepted the rebels at Lambayong now Baranggay Panduma Sr. which is seventy five meters from the shore, the Barracudas were able to take hostage a pumpboat operator along the way and were successful in taking over the Shell Depot which is located just a few meters from the shore. The depot manager was killed. However, their alleged plan to destroy the depot was stopped because of the Army's intervention by then. The group split in two: one group retreated to Luy-a where they beheaded two civilians and slaughtered one carabao for consumption and fed on uncooked mais. It took them a week to retreat since there were blockades by the 29th Infantry Brigade in their way. Eventually, the rebels were able to escape going to Lanao del Norte. The other group attacked Militar and neighboring coastal barangays. Blockades by the 29th IB, PA at Tukuran River prevented them to penetrate the town center; they were forced to retreat to the hinterlands of Libertad. Some casualties were not being reported due to the tension being experienced by the people. As they retreated, passing Barangay Baclay, they ambushed the Parish Priest of Aurora, Father Paulo Kill and luckily, he survived. In the aftermath, the rebels left 46 civilians, 11 rebels and IPAs dead.

The Barracuda-Ilaga Conflict had greatly depopulated the municipality as majority of the people relocated to other towns. Atty. Francisco D. Boter, the municipal registrar, in his article in Pagadian Times reported:

"Like a volcano that had erupted, Tukuran became a ghost town with only a handful of people roaming the streets with the mournful howling of scraggy dogs now and then disturbing the cemetery-like silence and solitude that pervaded the ones buzzing and taming residents."

=== The tsunami of 1976 ===
On the evening of August 17, 1976, tsunami ravaged Illana Bay or 1976 Moro Gulf earthquake. It was caused by a 6.7 magnitude undersea earthquake. People that night living in the coast heard the roaring sound of the sea, ran to save their lives going to Curvada at about 9:30 in the evening. In Bayao, houses were washed out into the mangroves and into the Bayao River delta. This time the residents were given assistance by the joint group of social action center (SAC), Kapapagaria Foundation Inc. (KFI) in coordination with the Department of Social Welfare and Development (DSWD). Despite the devastation, only one casualty was reported.

The decade of 70s left three marks: first, as the years of ashes that brought destruction to Poblacion that caused severe economic breakdown of the municipality. Second, the tsunami on Illana Bay that destroyed properties. Third, was the Ilaga-Barracuda conflict in Tukuran that brought famine and hunger to the people and the very reason of the depopulation of the municipality. The general masses, both Christians and Muslims were caught in the middle of crossfire. Many of them transferred to neighboring towns of Aurora, Molave, Bonifacio, Pagadian, and even going back to Visayan islands, their homeland, if only to secure their life. Most of the Visayan people in the Poblacion took refuge in Dumaguete.

In 1978, right in his office, Mayor Antonio Jimenez, O.D. was arrested. An ASO or arrest and seizure order was issued against him from the national government. The remaining populace were baffled on the fate of the honorable mayor.

A series of related incidents on PA and CPP-NPA struggles in Tukuran during the 1980s. This was because of the Marcos dictatorship, communist movement had spread in the whole archipelago in an aim to change the routine style of the government. In this decade most of the barangay people fled or were forced and obliged to seek refuge in concentration camps and schools to protect them from the crossfire of two raging forces.

=== Post-EDSA Revolution to present ===
After the EDSA Revolution, Isaias Barrido was appointed as municipal mayor as part of the reorganization program of Aquino government. He was a former forest ranger assigned at the Baclay nursery, a reforestation project of the national government. The first challenge to his administration occurred on October 24, 1986, due to the intense operation of PA against CPP-NPA. A mistarget landed in Curvada rice field. Hundreds could have been killed if it landed in the public market.

In 1988, the new government of Corazon Aquino ordered the conduct of a local elections in the Philippines. Bonifacio Vega was elected town mayor. His first term was characterized as the height of CPP-NPA and PA struggle. In Tagulo incident, there were seven killed in the side of the government. PA strongly believes that it was done by the CPP-NPA. Because of the struggle of two raging forces, his administration adopted, through the advice of the military, the policy of hamleting. As a result, the farmers in the far-flung barangays suffered. The military had estimated 80% of the business sectors were influenced by the rebels. Some of the suspected members of the CPP-NPA were arrested. The mayor had a hard time solving the main problem of his municipality.

Vega won for the second time in the 1992 National Elections. The issue on the CPP-NPA struggle was eventually resolved due to the implementation of various projects which focused on both socio-economic and socio-cultural aspects. In the 1995 National Elections, Vega was set to run but then decided not to, for health reasons. Instead, he endorsed Isaias Barrido under the banner of Lakas-NUCD. Isaias Barrido won the election. By the advent of IRA the barangays comprising the municipality were provided with increased shares of the financial resources of the government with the aim of enhancing the delivery of basic services to the people for the second time he was elected. Municipal road concreting was one of his main programs, livelihood programs were his main focus. Because of the Internal Revenue Allotment (IRA) from the National Government, many projects were completed during his administration. He continued the construction of municipal streets, hanging bridge, solar driers, water reservoir, basketball courts, and farm to market roads to fasten the development of rural barangays. The municipal streets and other newly constructed infrastructures under the Barrido administration had changed greatly the profile of the municipality.

== Geography ==
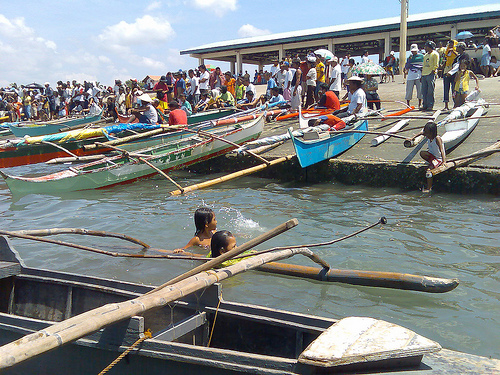
Tukuran Fish Port

The town of Tukuran is situated in the isthmus of Zamboanga peninsula of its southern part. After the construction of Maharlika Highway or the Tukuran-Dabliston Road, a national highway, Tukuran became the passageway of two regions – that are Region 9 and Region 10. The City of Pagadian can be reached within 20 minutes via private vehicle while 45–50 minutes via public utility vehicle or PUJ.

=== Climate ===
Climate data for Tukuran, Zamboanga del Sur
Month	Jan	Feb	Mar	Apr	May	Jun	Jul	Aug	Sep	Oct	Nov	Dec	Year
Mean daily maximum °C (°F)	29 (84)	30 (86)	31 (88)	31 (88)	30 (86)	30 (86)	29 (84)	30 (86)	30 (86)	30 (86)	30 (86)	30 (86)	30 (86)
Mean daily minimum °C (°F)	22 (72)	22 (72)	22 (72)	23 (73)	24 (75)	24 (75)	24 (75)	24 (75)	24 (75)	24 (75)	23 (73)	23 (73)	23 (74)
Average precipitation mm (inches)	69 (2.7)	58 (2.3)	67 (2.6)	60 (2.4)	109 (4.3)	114 (4.5)	83 (3.3)	78 (3.1)	76 (3.0)	92 (3.6)	86 (3.4)	63 (2.5)	955 (37.7)
Average rainy days	12.8	11.6	14.8	17.4	24.8	23.5	20.7	18.5	17.4	22.5	21.6	15.6	221.2
Source: Meteoblue

=== Barangays ===
Tukuran is politically subdivided into 25 barangays. Each barangay consists of puroks while some have sitios.

- Alindahaw
- Baclay
- Balimbingan
- Buenasuerte
- Camanga
- Curvada
- Laperian
- Libertad
- Lower Bayao
- Luy-a
- Manilan
- Manlayag
- Militar
- Navalan
- Panduma Senior (formerly Lambayong)
- Sambulawan
- San Antonio
- San Carlos (Poblacion)
- Santo Niño (Poblacion)
- Santo Rosario
- Sugod
- Tabuan
- Tagulo
- Tinotungan
- Upper Bayao

== Demographics ==
Population census of Tukuran
Year	Pop.	±% p.a.
1918	3,921	—
1960	14,607	+3.18%
1970	19,274	+2.81%
1975	18,846	−0.45%
1980	22,377	+3.49%
1990	26,854	+1.84%
1995	30,506	+2.42%
2000	33,747	+2.19%
2007	36,591	+1.12%
2010	37,883	+1.27%
2015	39,820	+0.95%
2020	42,429	+1.34%
2024	42,683	+0.14%
Source: Philippine Statistics Authority

== Economy ==
Poverty incidence of Tukuran (%)

Source: Philippine Statistics Authority

The town is primarily agricultural with rice as its main crop. It also has a thriving fishport. The town's long stretch of fine black sand is a popular weekend destination for people from Pagadian and neighboring towns.

One of the most important industries is fishery. Tukuran and Pagadian City and many of the western towns have rich fishing grounds and the fish caught in Tukuran and Pagadian City are transported to Ozamiz City, Iligan City and Cagayan de Oro. The fish caught in the western towns, due to costly transportation, are either salted or dried and sold to neighboring provinces. Life in Tukuran is relatively abundant.

== Culture ==
Tingson's Pangisda Festival Competition – Tribal dance competition every January organized by the owner of TS Fishing for yearly fiesta of Sr. Santo Niño of Cebu. On January 13, 2011, the second year competition was held with a grand prize of ₱50,000. This competition will hopefully be held annually in coordination with the barangay (Santo Niño) and Municipal LGUs.

Mutya ng Tukuran – An annual beauty competition highlighting the Araw ng Tukuran Celebration every April 1 of the calendar year. The pageant is regularly held every March 31.

Sakayan Festival – An annual exhibition/parade of floats and the conduct of relevant activities sharing the same "sakayan" concept on the occasion of the "Araw ng Tukuran".

Fluvial Parade – being conducted on the day before the town fiesta or during the vesperas.

Municipal Fiesta – A yearly celebration of the Our Lady of Star of the Sea under the Diocese of Pagadian City. This happens every last Saturday of October. However, when the last Saturday is too close to November 1, the fiesta is being celebrated on the Saturday preceding the last.

== Transportation ==
- Payong-Payong – A tricycle transportation derived from using payong, a Filipino term of UMBRELLA that protects the passengers against heat and rain and operates its route from town to beach resorts and to the various barangays of the Municipality.
- Habal-Habal – A mode of transport by single motorcycles to the Municipality of Sultan Naga Dimaporo or Also known as Karomatan, and to far-flung barangays which are not reachable by other modes of transportations.
- Rural Transit – Starts its operation in March 2010 from Tukuran to Ozamiz City via Aurora and Aurora To Pagadian City via Tukuran.
- Sikad-Sikad – Around the town, a gas-less way of transportation by using pedals to run.

== Government ==
Tukuran LGU Officers (from 2019 to 2022)
Title	Name
Mayor	Macario V. Tingson
Vice Mayor	Delfina S. Cortina
SB Member	Rolly S. Cortina
SB Member	Elinore V. Chua
SB Member	Jocyl Faith C. Vega
SB Member	Macario B. Tutor, Jr.
SB Member	Benjamin A. de Jesus
SB Member	Bobby H. Mamentong
SB Member	Sukarno M. Mamasalagat
SB Member	Victoria G. Pintac
LnB President	Romulo R. Gorpido
SK Fed. Pres.	Dante M. Sabal

Municipal Mayors and Vice Mayors
Year	Mayor	Vice Mayor	Reference
2019-2022	Macario V. Tingson	Delfina S. Cortina	
2018-2019	Maychel O. Velayo-Rota, MAGD (Interim)	Atty. Kenneth O. Alivio, CPA, MAGD (Interim)	
2016–2018	Atty. Francisvic S. Villamero	Maychel O. Velayo-Rota	
2013–2016	Atty. Francisvic S. Villamero	Maychel O. Velayo-Rota	
2010–2013	Atty. Francisvic S. Villamero	Caesar C. Rota	
2007–2010	Bonifacio C. Vega Jr.	Caesar C. Rota	
2004–2007	Bonifacio C. Vega Jr.	Caesar C. Rota	
2001–2004	Isaias P. Barrido	Rosalio O. Velayo, Sr.	
1998–2001	Isaias P. Barrido	Rosalio O. Velayo, Sr.	
1995–1998	Isaias P. Barrido	Marcelino C. Rota, Sr.	
1992–1995	Bonifacio Vega Sr.	Marcelino C. Rota, Sr.	
1988–1992	Bonifacio Vega Sr.	Francisco Dosdos	
1987–1988	Eduardo Salon	Nicanor Suarin	
Dec 1–15 1987	Idelfonso S. Catane		
1986–1987	Isaias P. Barrido	Bueno E. Cadungog	
1980–	Prudencio Calletor		
1978–	Dr. Antonio Jimenez, OD		
1962–	Prudencio Calletor		
1959–	Felomino C. Villamero	Sultan Mamadra Panduma	

== Education ==
=== Pre-school ===
- Stella Maris Learning Center (Nursery and Kinder 1 and 2)
- Liceo de Zamboanga Nursery, Kindergarten (K1) and Preparatory (K2)

=== Primary ===
Private

- SDA-Seventh Day Adventist Elementary School
- Liceo de Zamboanga Grade 1 & 2

Public

Tukuran West District

- TCES – Tukuran Central Elementary School - San Carlos
- TSC – Tukuran Sped School - San Carlos
- Panduma Sr. Elem. School - Panduma Sr.

Tukuran East District

- SNCES-Santo Niño Central Elementary School - Santo Niño
- Baclay Elementary School - Baclay
- Balimbingan Elementary School - Balimbingan
- Jose Suico Sr. Memorial Elementary School - Alindahaw
- Libertad Elementary School - Libertad
- M.R. Dablo Elementary School - M.R. Dablo
- Man-ilan Elementary School - Man-ilan
- Manlayag Elementary School - Manlayag
- Margarito V. Lagare Memorial Elementary School - Navalan
- Militar Elementary School - Militar
- Sambulawan Elementary School - Sambulawan
- San Antonio Elementary School - San Antonio
- Sugod Elementary School - Sugod
- Santa Rosario Elementary School
- Tabuan Elementary School - Tabuan
- Tinotongan Elementary School - Tinotongan

=== Secondary ===
Private

- SSHS – Star of the Sea High School – Sister School of Saint Columban High School in Pagadian City

Public

- TTVHS – Tukuran Technical-Vocational High School; Campuses:
1. TTVHS Campus 1–3rd and 4th year
2. TTVHS Campus 2–2nd year
3. TTVHS Campus 3–1st year
4. TTVHS Tagulo Extension Campus
5. TTVHS Tabuan Extension Campus
- NNHS – Navalan National High School
- LNHS – Laperian National High School

=== Tertiary ===
Public

- JHCSC – Josephina H. Cerilles State College Tukuran Campus

Private

- Hyrons Philippines College
