= Tukuran Technical-Vocational High School =

Public high school in Zamboanga del Sur, Philippines

Location
- Brgy. San Carlos, Tukuran, Zamboanga del Sur; Philippines
- Coordinates: 7°51′33″N 123°34′19″E

Information
- Type: Comprehensive Public High School
- Superintendent: Visminda G. Serrato, SDS
- Principal: Julie Doliente, Ed.D
- Grades: Grades 7,8,9,10,11 & 12
- Enrollment: May 2011
- Campus size: 5 campuses
- Campus type: Suburban
- Color(s): pink and white
- Newspaper: The Hills, Batikang Maninisid

Tukuran Technical-Vocational High School is a public high school located in Tukuran, Zamboanga del Sur, Philippines. It is composed of five campuses and the leading Public High School in the municipality. It is the Venue of SSDC meet in the cluster of Aurora, Labangan and Tukuran for the preparation for yearly provincial meet.

== Campuses ==
| Campus | Assigned Head Teacher | Occupation | Location |
|---|---|---|---|
| Campus 1 | Mr. Wilfredo Jabillo | Grade 7 | San Carlos, Tukuran, Zamboanga del Sur |
| Campus 2 | Mr. Filomeno Bahian | Grade 8 | San Carlos, Tukuran, Zamboanga del Sur |
| Campus 3 | Mrs. Luz F. Estrera | Grade 9 - Grade 10 | San Carlos, Tukuran, Zamboanga del Sur |
| Tagulo Extension Campus | Mr. Celso Pilones Sr. | Gr. 7,8,9 & 10 | Tagulo, Tukuran, Zamboanga del Sur |
| Tabuan Extension Campus | Dr. Kian Juster Aranez XVI | Gr. 7,8,9 & 10 | Tabuan, Tukuran, Zamboanga del Sur |

== Former names ==
- Tukuran Comprehensive National High School - 2004-2010
- San Carlos National High School - ?
- San Carlos Barangay High School - ?

== Principals ==
- Luther Castillo, Ed.D. - present
- Visminda E. Serrato, Ed.D.
- Mrs. Clara D. Hamoy
- Danilo P. Ungang, Ed.D.
- Exaltacion G. Jabone, Ed.D.

== See also ==
- Tukuran, Zamboanga del Sur
