= Saint Columban College =

Private college in Zamboanga del Sur, Philippines

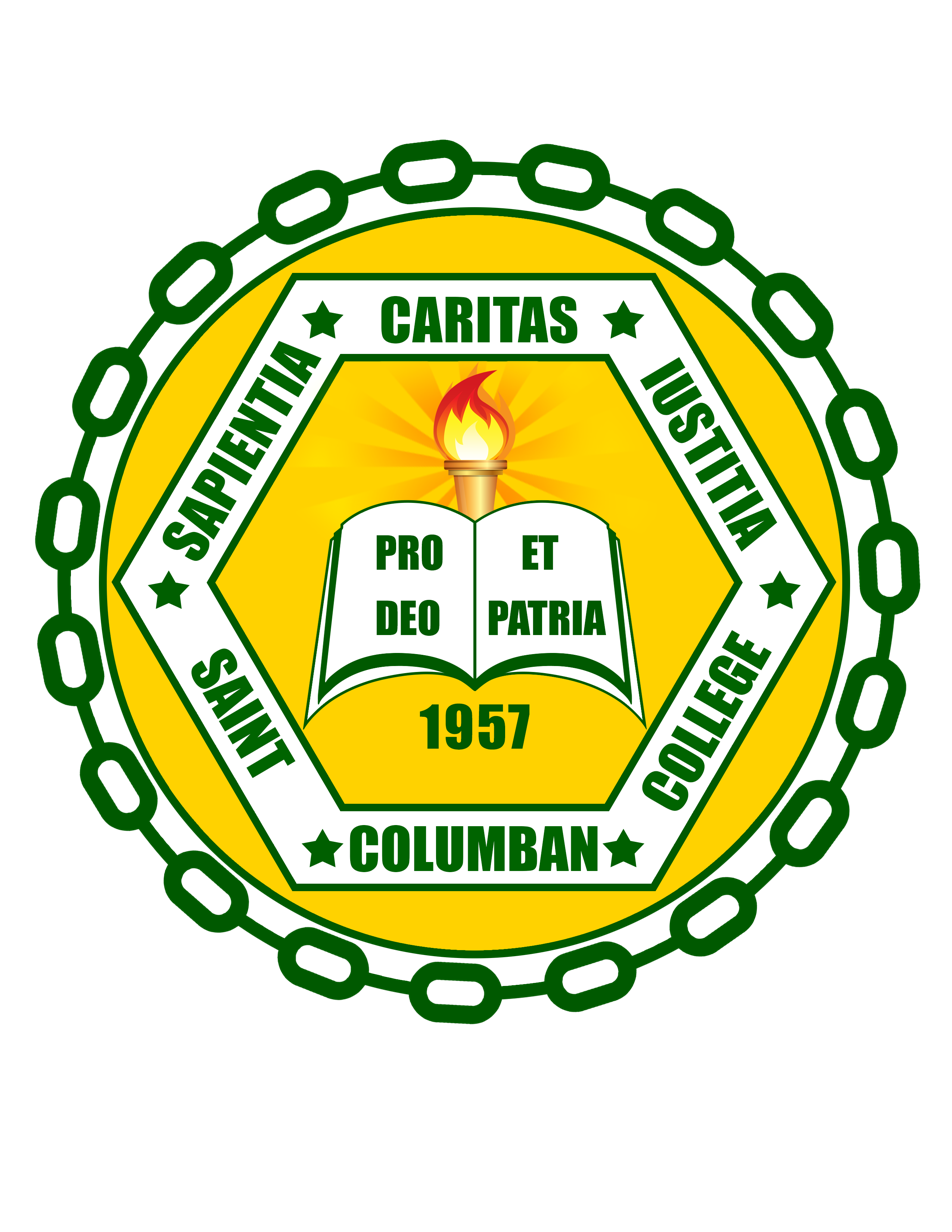
- Former name: Saint Columban School (1957–1967)
- Motto: Sapientia Caritas Iustitia (Latin)
- Motto in English: Wisdom Love Justice
- Type: Private Roman Catholic Non-profit Coeducational Basic and Higher education institution
- Established: 1957; 69 years ago
- Founders: Fr. Sean Nolan MSSC; Sr. Teresita del Niño Jesus Reyes, SPC; Sr. Isabel of the Angels Narciso, SPC; Sr. Marie Odille Cayetano SPC; Sr. Anne Bacomo SPC
- Religious affiliation: Catholic Church (Diocese of Pagadian)
- Academic affiliations: DSGP CEAP
- Chairman: Bishop Emmanuel T.Cabajar, C.Ss.R., D.D.
- President: Rev. Fr. Nestor Remasog, STL, PhD,
- Vice-president: Dr. Mary Jane B. Ommandam, RGC (VP for Administration) Dr. Mario F. Alayon (VP for Academic Affairs) Virginia A. Ruben, CPA (VP for Finance)
- Principal: Sr. Agnes Y. Suarin, CB (Senior High School)
- Dean: Dr. Susan Ramirez (College of Business Education) Dr. Genesis Naparan (College of Teacher Education, Arts, and Science) Dr. Philipcris C. Encarnacion (College of Computing Science) Mrs. Romelinda Salvacion (College of Criminology)
- Faculty: full-time: 100+; part-time: not available
- Students: 4,200+
- Location: Corner Cerilles & Sagun St., San Francisco District, Pagadian City 7016, Zamboanga del Sur, Philippines; 7°49′36″N 123°26′20″E
- Campus: Buenavista Pagadian City College: San Francisco District Main Campus and Senior High School: Sto. Niño District Grade and Junior High School: Balangasan District
- Alma Mater song: "SCC Hymn"
- Colors: Green - Yellow - Red
- Nicknames: Old: "Columban"; New: "SCCian"
- Mascot: "Dream hunter"
- Website: www.sccpag.edu.ph
- Location in Mindanao Location in the Philippines

Saint Columban College is a private, Catholic, coeducational basic and higher education institution run by the Diocese of Pagadian in Pagadian City, Zamboanga del Sur, Philippines. Founded in 1957 as Saint Columban School, it is the largest among the Diocesan Schools of Pagadian. Columban offers primary, secondary, tertiary, graduate and law education.

== History ==
=== Saint Columban School ===
Saint Columban College was founded as Saint Columban School in 1957 by Fr. Sean Nolan of the Missionary Society of St. Columban with Sisters Teresita del Niño Jesus Reyes, Isabel of the Angels Narciso, Marie Odille Cayetano, and Anne Bacomo of the Sisters of Saint Paul de Chartres. Under the leadership of Fr. Patrick Campion, S.S.C., Saint Columban School went "full operation" offering only secondary education.

In 1963, Columban started offering undergraduate programs in Liberal Arts, Education, Secretarial, and Commerce. To accommodate the new college students, a new three-story building was built on the main campus.

In 1965, Columban opened the elementary school under Sister Eugenie de Marie, SPC, as principal.

=== Saint Columbans College ===
Saint Columbans School grew into a college and in 1967 it was renamed Saint Columban College. By 1970, the college programs were transferred to the present college campus in Cerilles-Sagun Streets.

In 1978, the Diocese of Pagadian took over the administration and control of the college from the Missionary Society of St. Columban through Bishop Jesus B. Tuquib. Tuquib became chairman of the Board Trustees. Fr. Jose Maria Luengo was subsequently installed as the first Filipino President of the college. The "SCC Hymn" was later composed by Luengo with Bishop Patricio Getigan and Sister Agnes Lawrence Catalan.

On its 25th anniversary in 1982, Columban inaugurated a new four-storey building in the college campus which today houses the College of Business Education.

=== Recent history ===
The College of Computer Studies opened in 2002. Its Information Technology program is now recognized by the Commission on Higher Education as a Center for Excellence and Development.

On November 8, 2006, a fire incident reduced the main building at the high school campus into ashes displacing some classes for a year. Spare rooms and repurposed laboratories at the high school and grade school campuses housed the displaced classes.

In 2008, Columban inaugurated the first phase of the new and bigger main building at the high school campus. The building now houses majority of the classes, the chemistry laboratory, two computer laboratories, the audio-visual room, library, school clinic, and offices of the faculty, school treasurer, registrar, guidance counselor, and school principal.

The college campus received a facade overhaul in 2011 with the construction of the St. Therese Building. The building houses administrative offices, the guidance and counseling center, and the college chapel.

== Governance ==
Columban is governed by the Board of Trustees led by Bishop Emmanuel Cabajar of Pagadian, as chairman. In a concelebrated mass during the "Pasalamat Festival" in January 2017, Fr. Rico P. Sayson, J.C.L. was installed as School President replacing Fr. Gilbert M. Hingone, S.T.L.

== Campuses ==
Columban has four campuses. The grade school and high school campuses are divided only by the boundary between Balangasan and Sto. Niño districts of the city.

- Grade school campus in Balangasan district
- High school campus in Sto. Niño district
  - Since the implementation of the K-12 Program, the High School Department has been divided to two units; namely, the Junior and Senior High Schools. The high school campus houses the Junior High School.
- College campus at Cerilles-Sagun Streets in downtown Pagadian
  - The college campus houses the undergraduate programs and the Senior High School.
  - The new Buenavista Campus is occupied by the college of business education

=== Facilities ===
- Libraries
  - SCC has three libraries; one in each campus.
- Worship and Prayer
  - Grade school chapel
  - Chapel of the Immaculate Conception at the high school campus
  - College chapel
- Convention, Sports, and Recreation
  - SCC Youth Development Center (SCC-YDC) Gymnasium in Sagun Street, Pagadian City
  - SCC Alumni Association Sports Complex at the grade school campus
  - Kiosk-cum-gazebo at the high school campus
- Specialized Instruction
  - Hotel and Restaurant Management Laboratory at the Diocesan Pastoral Center
    - An operational hotel-school that provides training for students of the Hotel and Restaurant Management program.
  - iMac Computer Laboratory at the college campus
    - Equipped with iMac computers for the exclusive use of students of the Entertainment and Multimedia Computing program.

== Publications ==
- Grade School: Star Line Publication
- High School: The Link Publication
- Senior High School: The Capstone/Ang Hiraya Publication
- College: The Harp Publication

== Recognitions ==
- Center for Academic Excellence in Accountancy and Education for Region IX.
- Center for Academic Excellence and Development in Information Technology for Region IX.

== See also ==
- Diocese of Pagadian
- Diocesan Schools Group of Pagadian
- Pagadian City
- Zamboanga del Sur
