= Zacharias Jimenez =

Filipino Catholic bishop (1947–2018)

His Excellency, The Most Reverend Zacarias Cenita Jimenez D.D.
- Auxiliary Bishop Emeritus of Butuan
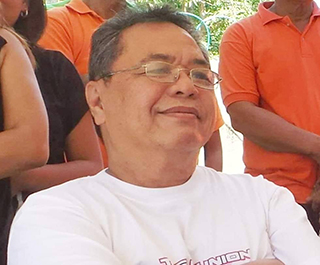
- Native name: "Bishop Ite"
- Province: Cagayan de Oro
- Diocese: Butuan
- See: Butuan
- Appointed: June 11, 2003
- Term ended: May 7, 2009
- Previous post: Bishop of Pagadian (1994–2003)

Orders
- Ordination: April 17, 1973
- Consecration: January 6, 1995 by Pope John Paul II

Personal details
- Born: Zacarias Cenita Jimenez; November 5, 1947 Inabanga, Bohol, Philippines
- Died: April 19, 2018 (aged 70) Butuan, Philippines
- Denomination: Roman Catholicism
- Coat of arms

Zacarias Cenita Jimenez (November 5, 1947 – April 19, 2018) was a Filipino Roman Catholic bishop.

== Biography ==
Born on November 5, 1947, in Inabanga, Bohol in the Philippines, Jimenez was ordained to the priesthood on April 17, 1973, at the St. Joseph's Cathedral in Tagbilaran. He was consecrated as bishop on January 6, 1995, at the St. Peter's Basilica in the Vatican City.. He also served as rector at St. Mary's Theologate, Gango, Ozamiz City for a short period of time.

He served as bishop of the Diocese of Pagadian, Philippines, from December 2, 1994, to June 11, 2003. He then served as auxiliary bishop of the Diocese of Butuan, Philippines and as titular bishop of Arba until his death.

He was discharged from a hospital on April 15, 2018, after suffering a second stroke but died at 8:01 a.m on April 19 due to acute respiratory failure in Butuan.

Catholic Church titles
Preceded by Antonio Tobias	Bishop of Pagadian; December 2, 1994 – June 11, 2003	Succeeded by Emmanuel Cabajar
Preceded by —	Auxiliary Bishop of Butuan; June 11, 2003 – May 7, 2009	Succeeded by —
Preceded by Cyryl Klimowicz	— TITULAR — Bishop of Arba; June 11, 2003 – April 19, 2018	Succeeded by Júlio César Souza de Jesus
