= Eeva Sippola =

Finnish linguist

Eeva Maija Sippola (born 1978) is a Finnish linguist. Her main areas include language contact, postcolonial sociolinguistics and typology, especially pidgins and creoles.

She received her PhD in Spanish philology from the University of Helsinki in 2011. Later on, she studied at Autonomous University of Madrid. From 2015 to 2017 she lectured Postcolonial Linguistics at the University of Bremen. Since 1 January 2023 she has been working at the University of Helsinki as a professor of Ibero-American Languages and Cultures.

Sippola advocates for the establishment of Colonial and Postcolonial Linguistics as an autonomous research field. Together with Anne Storch she was co-chair of the International Association for Colonial and Postcolonial Linguistics (IACPL), established 2014 in Bremen.

== Selected works ==
- Eeva Sippola: Una gramática descriptiva del chabacano de Ternate (doctoral thesis). University of Helsinki, 2011. http://urn.fi/URN:ISBN:978-952-10-7327-4
- Peter Bakker, Finn Borchsenius, Carsten Levisen and Eeva Sippola (eds.): Creole Studies: Phylogenetic Approaches. John Benjamins, 2017. https://doi.org/10.1075/z.211
- Carsten Levisen, Eeva Sippola, Britta Schneider: Language Ideologies in Music. Amsterdam: J. Benjamins, Special Issue of Language & Communication, 2017.
