= Diocese of Pagadian =

Latin Catholic diocese in the Philippines

Diocese of Pagadian Dioecesis Pagadianensis Diyosesis sa Pagadian Diyosesis ng Pagadian

Catholic
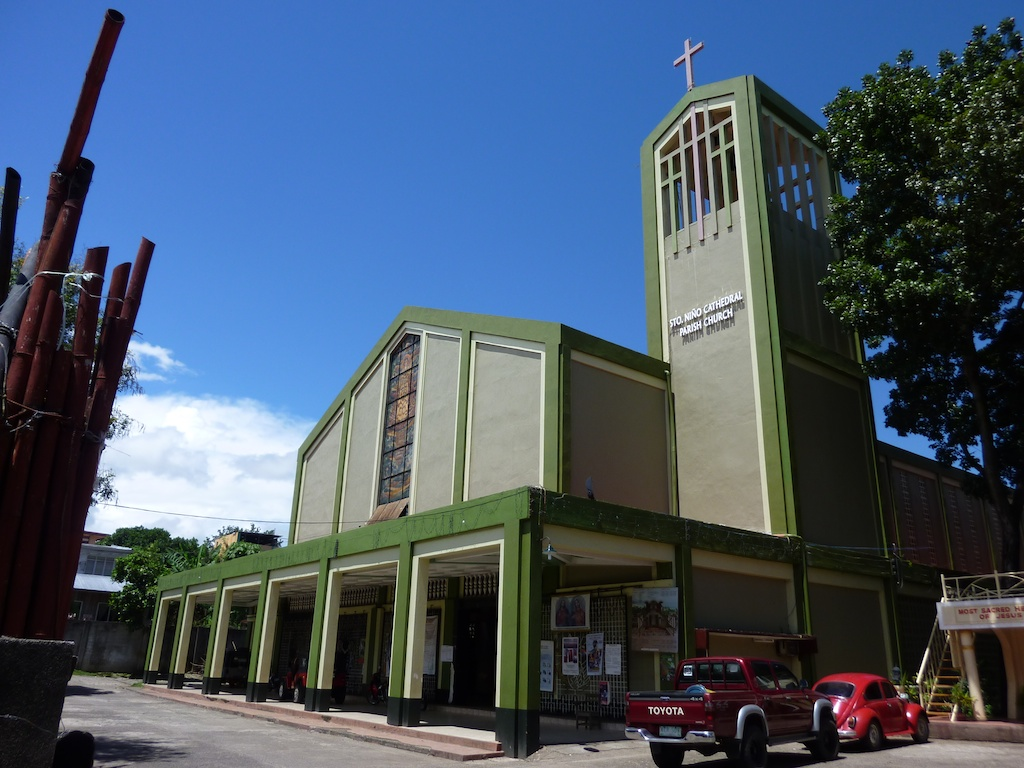
- Pagadian Cathedral

- Coat of arms

Location
- Country: Philippines
- Territory: Zamboanga del Sur (except for Bayog, Kumalarang, Lakewood)
- Ecclesiastical province: Ozamis
- Coordinates: 7°49′32″N 123°26′21″E

Statistics
- Area: 2,860 km^{2} (1,100 sq mi)
- Population: Total; Catholics: (as of 2021); 1,350,000; 1,085,000 (80.4%)

Information
- Denomination: Catholic Church
- Sui iuris church: Latin Church
- Rite: Roman Rite
- Established: November 12, 1971
- Cathedral: Cathedral of the Most Holy Name of Jesus
- Patron saint: Santo Niño de Pagadian
- Secular priests: 42

Current leadership
- Pope: Leo XIV
- Bishop: Ronald Anthony P. Timoner
- Metropolitan Archbishop: Martin Jumoad
- Vicar General: Rev. Fr. Paterno Dalumpines
- Bishops emeritus: Emmanuel Cabajar, CSsR

The Diocese of Pagadian (Latin: Dioecesis Pagadianensis) is a Latin Church ecclesiastical jurisdiction or diocese of the Catholic Church in the Philippines.

Created on November 12, 1971, the diocese was initially a suffragan of the Archdiocese of Zamboanga. With the ceding of the municipality of Margosatubig of the Ipil Prelature to the Diocese of Pagadian in January 1995, the diocese now has 24 parishes under its jurisdiction. The Catholic Christian population covered by the diocese is now 711,244 that comprises 72% of the total population of the area of about 2,860 square kilometers. The diocese is currently a suffragan to the Archdiocese of Ozamis.

The pastoral structure of the Diocese of Pagadian is organized into three areas of responsibility: consultative, judicial and administrative. Among its educational centers are one seminary, one college, 16 high schools and six pre-schools. The diocese has experienced no jurisdictional changes.

== Ordinaries ==
Bishop		Period in office	Coat of arms	Note
1.	Jesus Balaso Tuquib	24 February 1973 appointed – 31 March 1984		Appointed coadjutor archbishop of Cagayan de Oro
2.	Antonio Realubin Tobias	14 September 1984 appointed – 28 May 1993		Appointed bishop of San Fernando de La Union
3.	Zacharias Cenita Jimenez	2 December 1994 appointed – 11 June 2003		Appointed auxiliary bishop of Butuan
4.	Emmanuel Treveno Cabajar, C.SS.R.	14 May 2004 appointed – 22 November 2018		Retired
5.	Ronald Lunas, STL, DD	22 November 2018 - 2 January 2024		Died
6.	Ronald Anthony Timoner	2 April 2025 - present		
