= List of Catholic bishops in the Philippines =

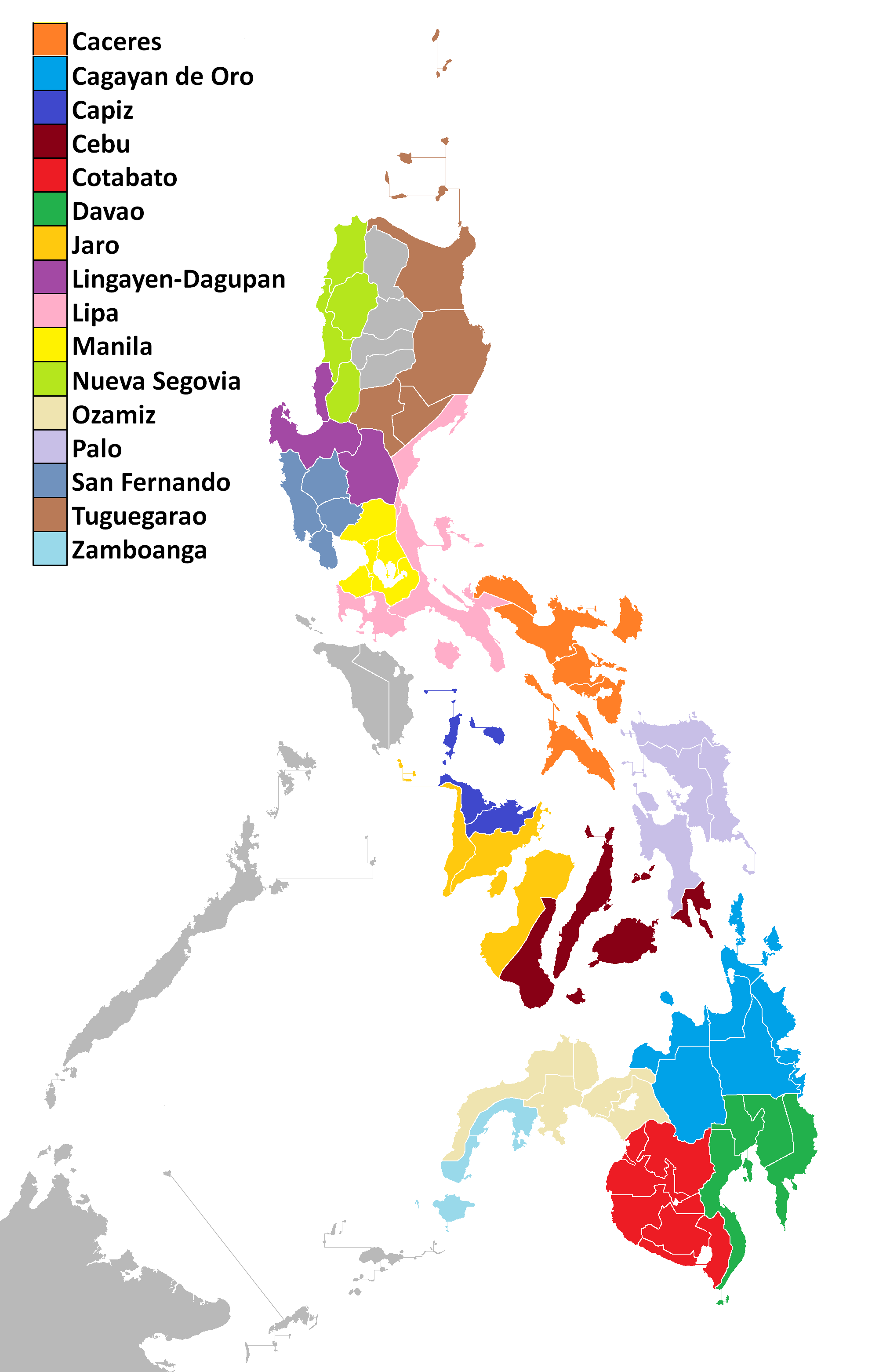
Philippines map showing each of the 16 Latin Church provinces. Each diocese is led by a bishop. In the Philippines, all archbishops are provincial metropolitans. Each color represents one of the 16 Latin Church provinces.

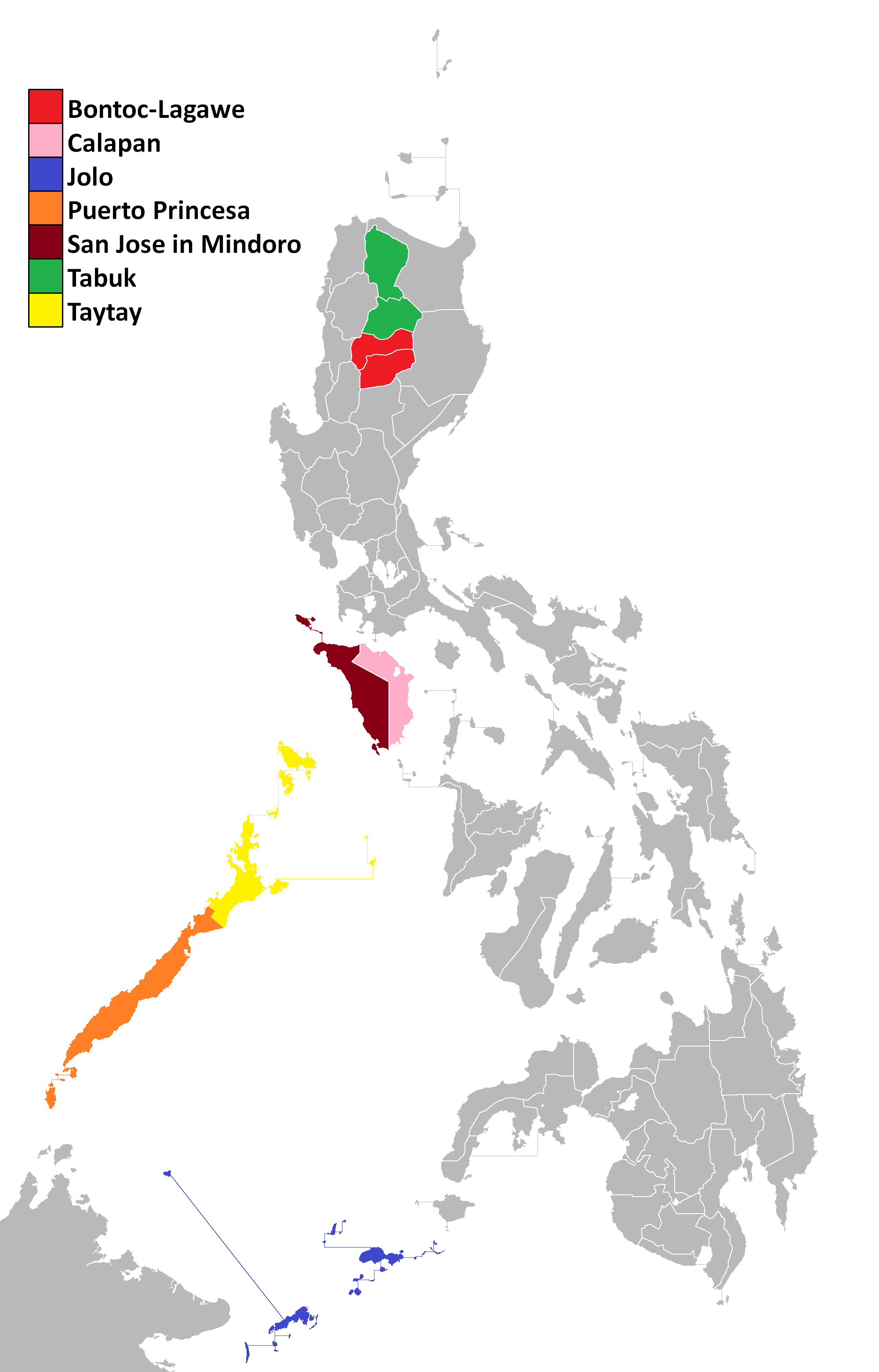
Map of apostolic vicariates of the Catholic Church in the Philippines, All apostolic vicars are under the jurisdiction of the Dicastery for Evangelization, through the apostolic nuncio.

The following is a list of bishops of the Catholic Church in the Philippines.

The Catholic Church in the Philippines comprises:

- 76 Latin Church dioceses led by bishops
- 6 apostolic vicariates led by apostolic vicars
- 4 territorial prelatures led by territorial prelates
- The Military Ordinariate of the Philippines, for military personnel

== Organization ==
The Catholic Church in the Philippines is divided into 76 dioceses in 16 ecclesiastical provinces, as well as 6 apostolic vicariates, 4 territorial prelatures and a military ordinariate. Each province has a metropolitan archdiocese led by an archbishop, and at least one suffragan diocese. The pope appoints all archbishops and bishops, who must be at least ordained priests. The pope chooses from a list of candidates provided by the Papal Nuncio of the Philippines to the Dicastery for Bishops in Rome.

- Most archdioceses and large dioceses have one or more auxiliary bishops, serving in association with the archbishop or diocesan bishop. After consultation with the Papal Nuncio to the Philippines, the pope appoints all auxiliary bishops.
- Some archdioceses and dioceses have a coadjutor archbishop or coadjutor bishop. The coadjutor assists an elderly or ailing archbishop or bishop with their administrative duties. After the archbishop or bishop retires or dies, the coadjutor normally succeeds him without an appointment by the pope. The pope appoints all coadjutors.

All Philippine (arch)bishops — active, retired, coadjutor, and auxiliary — are members of the Catholic Bishops' Conference of the Philippines (CBCP).

== Cardinals ==
As of December 8, 2024, one Latin Church metropolitan archbishop is a cardinal:

- Jose F. Advincula Jr. - Archdiocese of Manila

One suffragan diocese is led by a cardinal:

- Pablo Virgilio S. David - Diocese of Kalookan

Two archdioceses have retired archbishops who served as cardinal-archbishop:

- Gaudencio B. Rosales - Archdiocese of Manila
- Orlando B. Quevedo - Archdiocese of Cotabato

One cardinal, who was formerly a metropolitan archbishop, is assigned at the Roman Curia:

- Luis Antonio G. Tagle - Archdiocese of Manila

== List of current bishops ==
Ecclesiastical province map	Episcopal see coat of arms	Episcopal see	Ordinary	Date of installation	Title	Episcopal coat of arms
=== Ecclesiastical Province of Cáceres ===
		Archdiocese of Cáceres	Rex Andrew C. Alarcon	May 2, 2024 (2 years, 203 days)	Archbishop of Cáceres	
		Diocese of Daet	Herman G. Abcede, RCJ	May 1, 2025 (1 year, 204 days)	Bishop of Daet	
		Diocese of Legazpi	Joel Z. Baylon	Dec 10, 2009 (16 years, 346 days)	Bishop of Legazpi	
		Diocese of Libmanan	José R. Rojas Jr.	Jun 19, 2009 (18 years, 155 days)	Bishop of Libmanan	
		Diocese of Masbate	Sede vacante Since Dec 13, 2025 (343 days)		Bishop of Masbate	
		Diocese of Sorsogon	Jose Alan V. Dialogo	Dec 14, 2019 (6 years, 342 days)	Bishop of Sorsogon	
		Diocese of Virac	Luisito A. Occiano	Jun 26, 2024 (2 years, 148 days)	Bishop of Virac	
=== Ecclesiastical Province of Cagayan de Oro ===
		Archdiocese of Cagayan de Oro	Jose A. Cabantan	Aug 28, 2020 (6 years, 85 days)	Archbishop of Cagayan de Oro	
		Diocese of Butuan	Cosme Damian R. Almedilla	Jun 25, 2019 (7 years, 149 days)	Bishop of Butuan	
		Diocese of Malaybalay	Noel P. Pedregosa	Sep 14, 2021 (5 years, 68 days)	Bishop of Malaybalay	
		Diocese of Prosperidad	Ruben C. Labajo	Jan 28, 2025 (1 year, 297 days)	Bishop of Prosperidad	
		Diocese of Surigao	Antonieto D. Cabajog	Jul 24, 2001 (25 years, 120 days)	Bishop of Surigao	
		Diocese of Tandag	Raul B. Dael	Jun 14, 2018 (8 years, 160 days)	Bishop of Tandag	
=== Ecclesiastical Province of Capiz ===
		Archdiocese of Capiz	Victor B. Bendico	May 3, 2023 (3 years, 202 days)	Archbishop of Capiz	
		Diocese of Kalibo	Cyril B. Villareal	Apr 23, 2026 (212 days)	Bishop of Kalibo	
		Diocese of Romblon	Narciso V. Abellana, MSC	Jan 9, 2014 (12 years, 316 days)	Bishop of Romblon	
=== Ecclesiastical Province of Cebu ===
		Archdiocese of Cebu	Alberto S. Uy	Sep 30, 2025 (1 year, 52 days)	Archbishop of Cebu	
		Diocese of Dumaguete	Julito B. Cortes	Dec 5, 2013 (12 years, 351 days)	Bishop of Dumaguete	
		Diocese of Maasin	Precioso D. Cantillas, SDB	Mar 11, 1998 (28 years, 255 days)	Bishop of Maasin	
		Diocese of Tagbilaran	Crispin B. Varquez	Oct 27, 2026 (25 days)	Bishop of Tagbilaran	
		Diocese of Talibon	Patrick Daniel Y. Parcon	Aug 26, 2014 (12 years, 87 days)	Bishop of Talibon	
=== Ecclesiastical Province of Cotabato ===
		Archdiocese of Cotabato	Charlie M. Inzon, OMI	Dec 8, 2025 (348 days)	Archbishop of Cotabato	
		Diocese of Kidapawan	Jose Colin M. Bagaforo	Sep 6, 2016 (10 years, 76 days)	Bishop of Kidapawan	
		Diocese of Marbel	Cerilo U. Casicas	Jul 11, 2018 (8 years, 133 days)	Bishop of Marbel	
=== Ecclesiastical Province of Davao ===
		Archdiocese of Davao	Romulo G. Valles	May 22, 2012 (14 years, 183 days)	Archbishop of Davao	
		Archdiocese of Davao	George B. Rimando	May 25, 2006 (20 years, 179 days)	Auxiliary Bishop of Davao	
		Diocese of Digos	Guillermo V. Afable	Feb 11, 2003 (23 years, 283 days)	Bishop of Digos	
		Diocese of Mati	Abel C. Apigo	Apr 25, 2018 (8 years, 210 days)	Bishop of Mati	
		Diocese of Tagum	Medel S. Aseo	Jun 20, 2018 (8 years, 154 days)	Bishop of Tagum	
=== Ecclesiastical Province of Jaro ===
		Archdiocese of Jaro	Midyphil B. Billones	Apr 2, 2025 (1 year, 233 days)	Archbishop of Jaro	
		Diocese of Bacolod	Louie P. Galbines	Aug 11, 2026 (102 days)	Bishop of Bacolod	
		Diocese of Kabankalan	Sede vacante Since May 14, 2026 (191 days)		Bishop of Kabankalan	
		Diocese of San Carlos	Gerardo A. Alminaza	Nov 14, 2013 (13 years, 3 days)	Bishop of San Carlos	
		Diocese of San Jose de Antique	Marvyn A. Maceda	Apr 9, 2019 (7 years, 226 days)	Bishop of San Jose de Antique	
=== Ecclesiastical Province of Lingayen-Dagupan ===
		Archdiocese of Lingayen-Dagupan	Socrates B. Villegas	Nov 4, 2009 (17 years, 17 days)	Archbishop of Lingayen-Dagupan	
		Archdiocese of Lingayen-Dagupan	Fidelis B. Layog	May 8, 2019 (7 years, 197 days)	Auxiliary Bishop of Lingayen-Dagupan	
		Diocese of Alaminos	Napoleon B. Sipalay Jr., OP	Mar 19, 2024 (2 years, 247 days)	Bishop of Alaminos	
		Diocese of Cabanatuan	Prudencio P. Andaya, Jr., CICM	Feb 3, 2025 (1 year, 291 days)	Bishop of Cabanatuan	
		Diocese of San Fernando de La Union	Daniel O. Presto	Aug 2, 2018 (8 years, 111 days)	Bishop of San Fernando de La Union	
		Diocese of San Jose (Nueva Ecija)	Samuel N. Agcaracar, SVD	Feb 6, 2026 (288 days)	Bishop of San Jose (Nueva Ecija)	
		Diocese of Urdaneta	Nick A. Vaquilar	Jul 28, 2026 (116 days)	Bishop of Urdaneta	
=== Ecclesiastical Province of Lipa ===
		Archdiocese of Lipa	Gilbert A. Garcera	Apr 21, 2017 (9 years, 214 days)	Archbishop of Lipa	
		Diocese of Boac	Edwin O. Panergo	Dec 2, 2025 (354 days)	Bishop of Boac	
		Diocese of Calapan	Moises M. Cuevas	Aug 7, 2026 (106 days)	Bishop of Calapan	
		Diocese of Gumaca	Euginius L. Cañete, MJ	Jan 4, 2025 (1 year, 321 days)	Bishop of Gumaca	
		Diocese of Lucena	Mel Rey M. Uy	Nov 8, 2017 (9 years, 13 days)	Bishop of Lucena	
		Territorial Prelature of Infanta	Dave D. Capucao	Sep 5, 2025 (1 year, 77 days)	Prelate of Infanta	
=== Ecclesiastical Province of Manila ===
		Archdiocese of Manila	Jose F. Advincula Jr.	Jun 24, 2021 (5 years, 150 days)	Archbishop of Manila	
		Diocese of Antipolo	Ruperto C. Santos	Jul 22, 2023 (3 years, 122 days)	Bishop of Antipolo	
		Diocese of Cubao	Elias L. Ayuban Jr., CMF	Dec 3, 2024 (1 year, 353 days)	Bishop of Cubao	
		Diocese of Imus	Reynaldo G. Evangelista	Jun 5, 2013 (13 years, 169 days)	Bishop of Imus	
		Diocese of Kalookan	Pablo Virgilio S. David	Jan 2, 2016 (10 years, 323 days)	Bishop of Kalookan	
		Diocese of Malolos	Dennis C. Villarojo	Aug 21, 2019 (7 years, 92 days)	Bishop of Malolos	
		Diocese of Novaliches	Roberto O. Gaa	Aug 24, 2019 (7 years, 89 days)	Bishop of Novaliches	
		Diocese of Parañaque	Sede vacante Since Jun 6, 2026 (168 days)		Bishop of Parañaque	
		Diocese of Pasig	Mylo Hubert C. Vergara	Jun 23, 2011 (15 years, 151 days)	Bishop of Pasig	
		Diocese of San Pablo	Marcelino Antonio M. Maralit Jr.	Nov 21, 2024 (2 years, 0 days)	Bishop of San Pablo	
		Military Ordinariate of the Philippines	Oscar Jaime L. Florencio	Apr 3, 2019 (7 years, 232 days)	Military Ordinary of Military Ordinariate of the Philippines	
=== Ecclesiastical Province of Nueva Segovia ===
		Archdiocese of Nueva Segovia	David William V. Antonio	Jan 14, 2026 (311 days)	Archbishop of Nueva Segovia	
		Diocese of Baguio	Rafael T. Cruz	Sep 17, 2024 (2 years, 65 days)	Bishop of Baguio	
		Diocese of Bangued	Sede vacante Since Nov 7, 2026 (14 days)		Bishop of Bangued	
		Diocese of Laoag	Renato P. Mayugba	Dec 11, 2012 (14 years, 41 days)	Bishop of Laoag	
=== Ecclesiastical Province of Ozamis ===
		Archdiocese of Ozamis	Martin S. Jumoad	Nov 30, 2016 (9 years, 356 days)	Archbishop of Ozamis	
		Diocese of Dipolog	Severo C. Caermare	Oct 30, 2014 (12 years, 22 days)	Bishop of Dipolog	
		Diocese of Iligan	Jose R. Rapadas III	Sep 5, 2019 (7 years, 77 days)	Bishop of Iligan	
		Diocese of Pagadian	Ronald Anthony P. Timoner	Aug 13, 2025 (1 year, 100 days)	Bishop of Pagadian	
		Territorial Prelature of Marawi	Edwin A. de la Peña, MSP	Dec 27, 2001 (24 years, 329 days)	Prelate of Marawi	
=== Ecclesiastical Province of Palo ===
		Archdiocese of Palo	John F. Du	May 9, 2012 (14 years, 196 days)	Archbishop of Palo	
		Diocese of Borongan	Sede vacante Since Oct 27, 2026 (26 days)		Bishop of Borongan	
		Diocese of Calbayog	Isabelo C. Abarquez	Mar 8, 2007 (19 years, 258 days)	Bishop of Calbayog	
		Diocese of Catarman	Nolly C. Buco	Jan 15, 2025 (1 year, 310 days)	Bishop of Catarman	
		Diocese of Naval	Rex C. Ramirez	Jan 12, 2018 (8 years, 313 days)	Bishop of Naval	
=== Ecclesiastical Province of San Fernando ===
		Archdiocese of San Fernando	Florentino G. Lavarias	Oct 27, 2014 (12 years, 25 days)	Archbishop of San Fernando	
		Diocese of Balanga	Rufino C. Sescon Jr.	Mar 1, 2025 (1 year, 265 days)	Bishop of Balanga	
		Diocese of Iba	Bartolome G. Santos Jr.	May 25, 2018 (8 years, 180 days)	Bishop of Iba	
		Diocese of Tarlac	Roberto C. Mallari	Mar 27, 2025 (1 year, 239 days)	Bishop of Tarlac	
=== Ecclesiastical Province of Tuguegarao ===
		Archdiocese of Tuguegarao	Ricardo L. Baccay	Jan 14, 2020 (6 years, 311 days)	Archbishop of Tuguegarao	
		Diocese of Bayombong	Jose Elmer I. Mangalinao	Jul 25, 2018 (8 years, 119 days)	Bishop of Bayombong	
		Diocese of Ilagan	Sede vacante Since Jan 14, 2026 (311 days)		Bishop of Ilagan	
		Territorial Prelature of Batanes	Danilo B. Ulep	Aug 8, 2017 (9 years, 105 days)	Prelate of Batanes	
=== Ecclesiastical Province of Zamboanga ===
		Archdiocese of Zamboanga	Julius S. Tonel	Aug 22, 2023 (3 years, 91 days)	Archbishop of Zamboanga	
		Diocese of Ipil	Glenn M. Corsiga	Aug 14, 2025 (1 year, 99 days)	Bishop of Ipil	
		Territorial Prelature of Isabela	Leo M. Dalmao, CMF	May 24, 2019 (7 years, 181 days)	Prelate of Isabela	
=== Apostolic Vicariates ===
		Apostolic Vicariate of Tabuk	Sean B. Mejia	Jun 2, 2026 (172 days)	Apostolic Vicar of Tabuk	
		Apostolic Vicariate of Bontoc-Lagawe	Valentin C. Dimoc	Aug 4, 2015 (11 years, 109 days)	Apostolic Vicar of Bontoc-Lagawe	
		Apostolic Vicariate of San Jose in Mindoro	Pablito M. Tagura, SVD	Feb 25, 2023 (3 years, 269 days)	Apostolic Vicar of San Jose in Mindoro	
		Apostolic Vicariate of Taytay	Broderick S. Pabillo	Aug 19, 2021 (5 years, 94 days)	Apostolic Vicar of Taytay	
		Apostolic Vicariate of Puerto Princesa	Socrates C. Mesiona, MSP	Feb 10, 2017 (9 years, 284 days)	Apostolic Vicar of Puerto Princesa	
		Apostolic Vicariate of Jolo	Gerry Gamaliel S. delos Reyes, OMI		Apostolic Vicar-elect of Jolo	

== Living bishops-emeriti ==
Ecclesiastical province	Archbishop/Bishop	Title	Archdiocese/Diocese	Coat of arms
=== Local Sees ===
Cáceres	Rolando J. Tria Tirona, OCD	Archbishop Emeritus	Archdiocese of Cáceres	
Cáceres	Lucilo B. Quiambao	Auxiliary Bishop Emeritus	Diocese of Legazpi	
Cáceres	Manolo A. de los Santos	Bishop Emeritus	Diocese of Virac	
Cagayan de Oro	Antonio J. Ledesma, SJ	Archbishop Emeritus	Archdiocese of Cagayan de Oro	
Capiz	Jose Corazon T. Tala-oc	Bishop Emeritus	Diocese of Kalibo	
Cebu	Jose S. Palma	Archbishop Emeritus	Archdiocese of Cebu	
Cebu	Antonio R. Rañola	Auxiliary Bishop Emeritus	Archdiocese of Cebu	
Cebu	Leonardo Y. Medroso	Bishop Emeritus	Diocese of Tagbilaran	
Cotabato	Angelito R. Lampon, OMI	Archbishop Emeritus	Archdiocese of Cotabato	
Cotabato	Orlando B. Quevedo', OMI'	Archbishop Emeritus	Archdiocese of Cotabato	
Davao	Wilfredo D. Manlapaz	Bishop Emeritus	Diocese of Tagum	
Jaro	Jose Romeo Juanito O. Lazo	Archbishop Emeritus	Archdiocese of Jaro	
Jaro	Vicente M. Navarra	Bishop Emeritus	Diocese of Bacolod	
Jaro	Patricio A. Buzon, SDB	Bishop Emeritus	Diocese of Bacolod	
Lingayen-Dagupan	Jesus A. Cabrera	Bishop Emeritus	Diocese of Alaminos	
Lingayen-Dagupan	Sofronio A. Bancud, SSS	Bishop Emeritus	Diocese of Cabanatuan	
Lingayen-Dagupan	Jacinto A. Jose	Bishop Emeritus	Diocese of Urdaneta	
Lipa	Ramon C. Arguelles	Archbishop Emeritus	Archdiocese of Lipa	
Lipa	Emilio Z. Marquez	Bishop Emeritus	Diocese of Lucena	
Lipa	Bernardino C. Cortez	Prelate Emeritus	Territorial Prelature of Infanta	
Manila	Luis Antonio G. Tagle	Archbishop Emeritus	Archdiocese of Manila	
Manila	Gaudencio B. Rosales	Archbishop Emeritus	Archdiocese of Manila	
Manila	Crisostomo A. Yalung	Bishop Emeritus	Diocese of Antipolo	
Manila	Gabriel V. Reyes	Bishop Emeritus	Diocese of Antipolo	
Manila	Francisco M. de Leon	Bishop Emeritus	Diocese of Antipolo	
Manila	Honesto F. Ongtioco	Bishop Emeritus	Diocese of Cubao	
Manila	Deogracias S. Iñiguez Jr.	Bishop Emeritus	Diocese of Kalookan	
Manila	Teodoro C. Bacani Jr.	Bishop Emeritus	Diocese of Novaliches	
Manila	Antonio R. Tobias	Bishop Emeritus	Diocese of Novaliches	
Manila	Jesse E. Mercado	Bishop Emeritus	Bishop of Parañaque	
Manila	Leo M. Drona	Bishop Emeritus	Diocese of San Pablo	
Manila	Buenaventura M. Famadico	Bishop Emeritus	Diocese of San Pablo	
Nueva Segovia	Ernesto A. Salgado	Archbishop Emeritus	Archdiocese of Nueva Segovia	
Nueva Segovia	Marlo M. Peralta	Archbishop Emeritus	Archdiocese of Nueva Segovia	
Ozamis	Jose R. Manguiran	Bishop Emeritus	Diocese of Dipolog	
Ozamis	Emmanuel T. Cabajar, CSsR	Bishop Emeritus	Diocese of Pagadian	
Palo	Pedro R. Dean	Archbishop Emeritus	Archdiocese of Palo	
Palo	Emmanuel C. Trance	Bishop Emeritus	Diocese of Catarman	
Palo	Filomeno G. Bactol	Bishop Emeritus	Diocese of Naval	
San Fernando	Paciano B. Aniceto	Archbishop Emeritus	Archdiocese of San Fernando	
San Fernando	Florentino F. Cinense	Bishop Emeritus	Diocese of Tarlac	
Tuguegarao	Diosdado A. Talamayan	Archbishop Emeritus	Archdiocese of Tuguegarao	
Tuguegarao	Sergio L. Utleg	Archbishop Emeritus	Archdiocese of Tuguegarao	
Tuguegarao	Ramon B. Villena	Bishop Emeritus	Diocese of Bayombong	
Apostolic Vicariate	Pedro D. Arigo	Vicar Apostolic Emeritus	Apostolic Vicariate of Puerto Princesa	
Apostolic Vicariate	Edgardo S. Juanich	Vicar Apostolic Emeritus	Apostolic Vicariate of Taytay	
=== Foreign Sees and Apostolic Nunciatures ===
Apostolic Nuncio	Osvaldo M. Padilla	Apostolic Nuncio Emeritus	Korea and Mongolia	
Apostolic Nuncio	Adolfo Tito C. Yllana	Apostolic Nuncio Emeritus	Israel Jerusalem and Palestine	
Los Angeles	Alejandro D. Aclan	Auxiliary Bishop Emeritus	Archdiocese of Los Angeles (USA)	
Port Moresby	Rolando C. Santos, CM	Bishop Emeritus	Diocese of Alotau-Sideia (Papua New Guinea)	

== Filipino bishops serving outside of the Philippines ==
=== Bishop serving in the Roman Curia ===
Ordinary	Title	Appointment	Date of appointment	Coat of arms
Luis Antonio G. Tagle	Cardinal-Bishop	Dean of the College of Cardinals; Pro-Prefect for the Section of First Evangelization and New Particular Churches of the Dicastery for Evangelization	Jun 5, 2022 (4 years, 169 days)	

=== Bishops in the Vatican Diplomatic Corps ===
Ordinary	Title	Appointment	Date of appointment	Coat of arms
Bernardito C. Auza	Archbishop	Apostolic Nuncio to European Union	Mar 22, 2025 (1 year, 244 days)	
Arnaldo S. Catalan	Archbishop	Apostolic Nuncio to Rwanda	Jan 31, 2022 (4 years, 294 days)	
Francisco M. Padilla	Archbishop	Apostolic Nuncio to Guatemala	Apr 17, 2020 (6 years, 218 days)	

=== Bishops serving in foreign sees ===
Ordinary	See	Title	Date of appointment	Coat of arms
Pedro C. Baquero, SDB	Diocese of Kerema (Papua New Guinea)	Bishop of Kerema	Jan 20, 2017 (9 years, 305 days)	
Reynaldo B. Bersabal	Diocese of Sacramento (USA)	Auxiliary Bishop of Sacramento	Apr 20, 2024 (2 years, 215 days)	
Anthony C. Celino, CICM	Diocese of El Paso (USA)	Auxiliary Bishop of El Paso	Feb 8, 2023 (3 years, 286 days)	
Romeo D. Convocar	Diocese of Chalan Kanoa (Northern Mariana Islands)	Bishop of Chalan Kanoa	Nov 25, 2024 (1 year, 361 days)	
Joseph T. Durero	Diocese of Daru-Kiunga (Papua New Guinea)	Bishop of Daru-Kiunga	May 23, 2021 (5 years, 182 days)	
Efren V. Esmilla	Archdiocese of Philadelphia (USA)	Auxiliary Bishop of Philadelphia	Dec 8, 2023 (2 years, 348 days)	
Edgar C. Gacutan, CICM	Diocese of Sendai (Japan)	Bishop of Sendai	Dec 8, 2021 (4 years, 348 days)	
Reynaldo B. Getalado, MSP	Diocese of Rarotonga (Cook Islands)	Bishop of Rarotonga	Jun 29, 2024 (2 years, 145 days)	
Ryan P. Jimenez	Archdiocese of Agaña (Guam)	Archbishop of Agaña	Jul 6, 2024 (2 years, 138 days)	
Andres C. Ligot	Diocese of San José in California (USA)	Auxiliary Bishop of San José in California	Aug 29, 2025 (1 year, 84 days)	
Nelson A. Po	Archdiocese of Perth (Australia)	Auxiliary Bishop of Perth	Feb 2, 2026 (292 days)	
Rene A. Ramirez, RCJ	Diocese of Sandhurst (Australia)	Bishop of Sandhurst	Apr 11, 2026 (224 days)	
Oscar A. Solis	Diocese of Salt Lake City (USA)	Bishop of Salt Lake City	Jan 10, 2017 (9 years, 315 days)	

== Papal Nuncio to the Philippines ==
Name	Appointment	Date of appointment	Coat of arms
Charles John Brown	Apostolic Nuncio to the Philippines	Sep 28, 2020 (6 years, 54 days)	

== See also ==
- Catholic Church in the Philippines
- Historical list of the Catholic bishops of the Philippines
- List of Roman Catholic archdioceses
- List of Roman Catholic dioceses
- List of Catholic dioceses in the Philippines
