= President of the Catholic Bishops' Conference of the Philippines =

Leader of Filipino clergy group

- Pangulo ng Kapulungan ng mga Katolikong Obispo sa Pilipinas

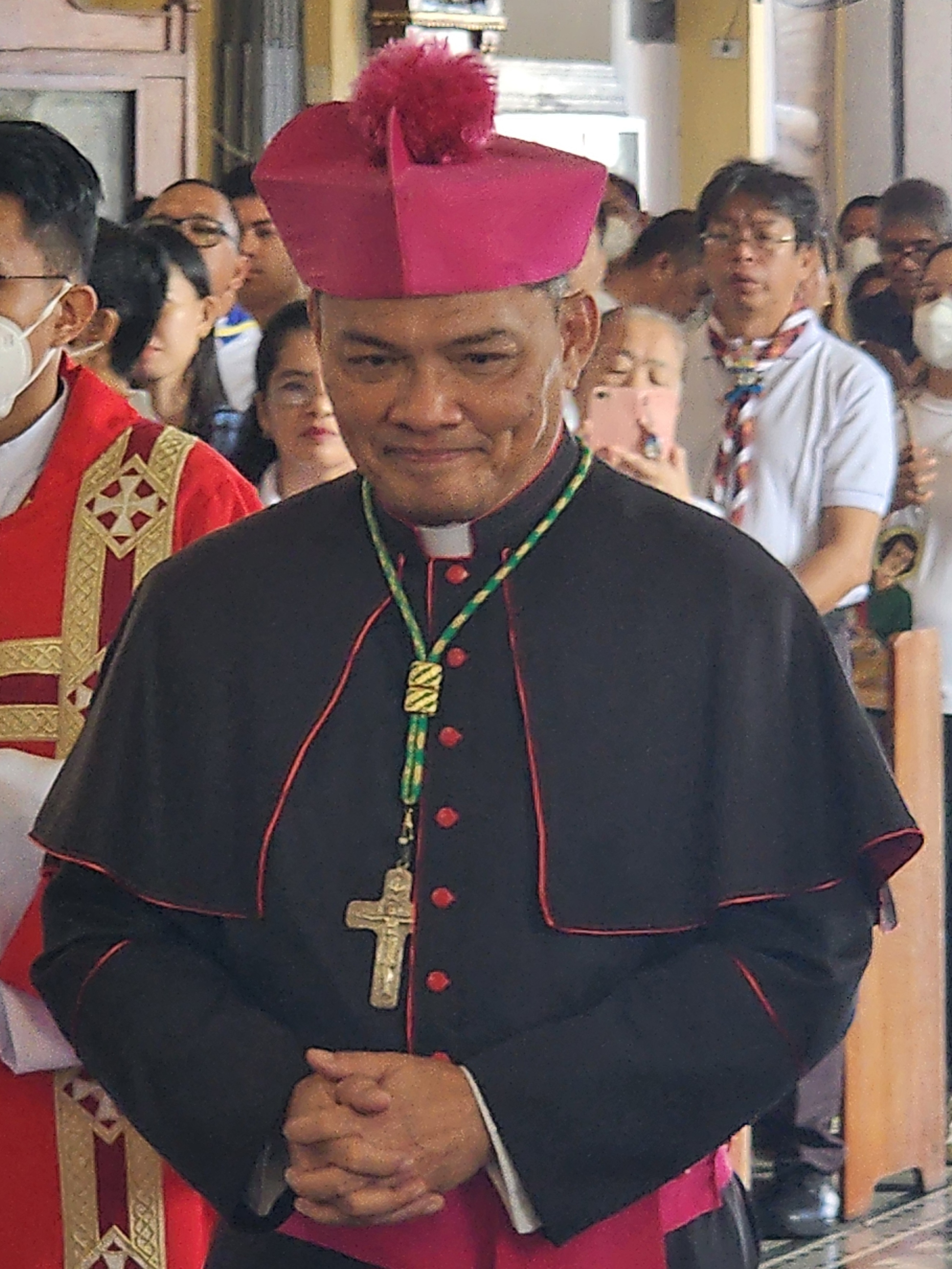
- Incumbent; Gilbert Garcera since December 1, 2025
- Seat: Manila, Philippines
- Term length: 2 years Renewable once
- Deputy: Julius Tonel

The president of the Catholic Bishops' Conference of the Philippines (Filipino: Pangulo ng Kapulungan ng mga Katolikong Obispo sa Pilipinas) is the executive head of the Catholic Bishops' Conference of the Philippines, the episcopal conference of the Catholic Church in the Philippines. The first president was elected in 1945.

== Position ==
Like all CBCP officials, the length of the term of the CBCP is two years and can run for a maximum of two terms.

The president along with the CBCP Permanent Council comes up with a collective decision for the CBCP.

Gilbert Garcera, Archbishop of Lipa, is the CBCP president since December 1, 2025.

== List ==
Name		Diocese	Tenure	
Name		Diocese	Start	End
	Gabriel Reyes	Archdiocese of Cebu	January 1, 1945	December 31, 1949
	Gabriel Reyes	Archdiocese of Manila	January 1, 1950	October 10, 1952
	Rufino Santos	Archdiocese of Manila	January 1, 1953	December 31, 1956
	Juan Sison	Archdiocese of Nueva Segovia	January 1, 1957	December 31, 1960
Julio Rosales	Julio Rosales	Archdiocese of Cebu	January 1, 1961	December 31, 1965
	Lino Gonzaga	Diocese of Palo	January 1, 1966	December 31, 1969
	Teopisto Alberto	Archdiocese of Caceres	January 1, 1970	December 31, 1973
Julio Rosales	Julio Cardinal Rosales	Archdiocese of Cebu	January 1, 1974	November 30, 1977
	Jaime Cardinal Sin	Archdiocese of Manila	December 1, 1977	November 30, 1981
	Antonio Mabutas	Archdiocese of Davao	December 1, 1981	November 30, 1984
	Ricardo Cardinal Vidal	Archdiocese of Cebu	December 1, 1985	November 30, 1987
	Leonardo Legaspi	Archdiocese of Caceres	December 1, 1987	November 30, 1991
	Carmelo Morelos	Archdiocese of Zamboanga	December 1, 1991	November 30, 1995
	Oscar Cruz	Archdiocese of Lingayen-Dagupan	December 1, 1995	November 30, 1999
	Orlando Quevedo	Archdiocese of Cotabato	December 1, 1999	November 30, 2003
	Fernando Capalla	Archdiocese of Davao	December 1, 2003	November 30, 2005
	Angel Lagdameo	Archdiocese of Jaro	December 1, 2005	November 30, 2009
	Nereo Odchimar	Diocese of Tandag	December 1, 2009	November 30, 2011
	José S. Palma	Archdiocese of Cebu	December 1, 2011	November 30, 2013
	Socrates Villegas	Archdiocese of Lingayen-Dagupan	December 1, 2013	November 30, 2017
	Romulo Valles	Archdiocese of Davao	December 1, 2017	November 30, 2021
	Pablo Virgilio Cardinal David	Diocese of Kalookan	December 1, 2021	November 30, 2025
	Gilbert Garcera	Archdiocese of Lipa	December 1, 2025	Incumbent
