= Abel Apigo =

Filipino Catholic bishop (born 1968)

His Excellency, The Most Reverend Monsignor Abel C. Apigo
- Metropolitan Archbishop-designate of Davao
- Province: Davao
- See: Davao
- Appointed: November 9, 2026
- Installed: January 14, 2027
- Predecessor: Romulo Valles

Orders
- Ordination: April 18, 1994 by Antonio Mabutas
- Consecration: April 24, 2018 by Romulo Valles

Personal details
- Born: Abel Cahiles Apigo; May 21, 1968 (age 58) Calinan, Davao City, Philippines
- Denomination: Roman Catholic
- Motto: Fortitudo Mea Dominus (Latin for 'The Lord is my strength')
- Coat of arms: Abel C. Apigo's coat of arms

Ordination history
History
Priestly ordination
- Ordained by: Antonio Mabutas
Episcopal consecration
- Principal consecrator: Romulo Valles
- Co-consecrators: Guillermo Afable; Julius Tonel

Styles of Abel C. Apigo
- Reference style: His Excellency; The Most Reverend
- Spoken style: Your Excellency
- Religious style: Bishop

Abel Cahiles Apigo (born May 21, 1968) is a Filipino prelate of the Roman Catholic Church. He was appointed Metropolitan Archbishop of Davao in November 2026, after serving as Bishop of Mati in Davao Oriental since 2018.

== Early life and education ==
Apigo was born in Calinan, Davao City, Philippines, on May 21, 1968. He studied philosophy and theology at St. Francis Xavier Regional Major Seminary in Davao City.

== Priesthood ==
Apigo was ordained a priest on April 18, 1994, for the Archdiocese of Davao. He began his ministry as a parochial vicar at San Pedro Cathedral from 1994 to 1996, assisting in pastoral care and liturgical functions. In 1996/97, he was pastoral director, focused on strengthening parish communities. Studying at the Pontifical Gregorian University in Rome from 1997 to 2000, he earned a licentiate in church history. He served as a professor at St. Francis Xavier Regional Major Seminary from 2000 to 2001 and then as coordinator for academic affairs from 2001 to 2002 and vice-rector and dean from 2002 to 2006. He was rector of the seminary from 2006 to 2018. He was also the archdiocese's episcopal vicar for clergy from 2014 to 2018.

== Episcopal ministry ==
On February 10, 2018, Pope Francis appointed Apigo as the Bishop of the Diocese of Mati. His episcopal ordination took place on April 24, 2018, at the Metropolitan Cathedral of San Pedro in Davao City, and he was installed as the Bishop of Mati on April 25, 2018, at San Nicolas de Tolentino Cathedral in Mati, Davao Oriental.

In Mati Apigo focused on the pastoral renewal of the diocese, advocating for the formation of lay leaders and increased youth involvement in the Church. He has also been active in strengthening the social action programs of the diocese, particularly those addressing poverty, education, and indigenous peoples' rights in Mindanao.

On November 9, 2026. Pope Leo XIV appointed him to succeed retiring Archbishop Romulo Valles as Metropolitan Archbishop of Davao.

Catholic Church titles
| Preceded by Patricio Hacbang Alo | Bishop of Mati; 2018–2026 | Vacant |
| Preceded by Romulo Valles | Archbishop of Davao; 2027–present | Incumbent |
