= Holy Cross College of Sasa =

Roman Catholic college in Davao City, Philippines

- Dalubhasaang Banal na Krus ng Sasa (Filipino)
- Former name: Holy Cross Academy of Sasa (1966-2009)
- Motto: In Hoc Signo Vinces (Latin)
- Motto in English: With this sign you will conquer
- Type: Private, Catholic Secondary and Tertiary education institution
- Established: 1966; 60 years ago
- Founder: Society of Foreign Missions (PME Fathers)
- Religious affiliation: Roman Catholic (Teresian Daughters of Mary)
- Academic affiliations: PAASCU
- President: Sr.Ma.Teresita V. Salang, TDM
- Principal: Sr.Ma.Florenda C.Mesiona TDM
- Location: Doña Pilar Avenue, Buhangin, Davao City, Davao del Sur, Philippines; 7°07′01″N 125°39′00″E
- Campus: Urban 2 hectares (20,000 m^{2})
- Website: www.hccsi.org
- Location in Mindanao Location in the Philippines

The Holy Cross College of Sasa is a private Catholic, secondary and tertiary education institution run by the Teresian Daughters of Mary in Davao City, Philippines under the auspices of the Roman Catholic Archdiocese of Davao. It was founded by the Society of Foreign Missions (P.M.E.) in 1966.

== History ==
The institution was established as the Holy Cross Academy of Sasa by the Society of Foreign Missions (P.M.E.) in 1966. It was renamed the Holy Cross College of Sasa in 2010, when it began offering college courses.

== Accreditation ==
This is a CHED Certified Higher Education Institution. They are members of the Philippine Society of IT Educators. The PAASCU granted them Level 1 Initial Accreditation for their Junior High School Program from May 2022 until May 2025.

== Undergraduate programs ==
The Holy Cross College of Sasa, Inc is offering the following courses:

- Bachelor of Science in Hotel and Restaurant Management
- Bachelor of Science in Tourism
- Bachelor of Science in Business Administration

Financial Management

- Bachelor of Science in Information Technology
- Bachelor of Science in Secondary Education

Filipino
English
Mathematics
