= George Rimando =

Auxiliary Bishop in the Philippines

Most Reverend George Beluso Rimando
- Auxiliary Bishop
- Church: Catholic Church
- Diocese: Roman Catholic Archdiocese of Davao

Orders
- Ordination: April 22, 1980 by Joseph William Regan
- Consecration: May 25, 2006 by Fernando R. Capalla

Personal details
- Born: February 2, 1953 (age 73) Tagum

George Beluso Rimando (born February 2, 1953) is an auxiliary bishop of Davao in the Philippines.

Rimando was ordained a priest on April 22, 1980.

On March 4, 2006, Pope Benedict XVI appointed him Auxiliary Bishop of Davao and Titular Bishop of Vada. He was consecrated bishop on May 25, 2006 by Fernando Capalla, Archbishop of Davao. Co-consecrators were Romulo Geolina Valles, Bishop of Kidapawan; and Wilfredo D. Manlapaz, Bishop of Tagum.
