= Guillermo Afable =

Filipino Catholic bishop (born 1951)

The Most Reverend Guillermo Afable D.D.
- Bishop of Digos
- Province: Davao
- See: Digos
- Appointed: April 24, 2002
- Installed: February 11, 2003
- Predecessor: Generoso Camiña, P.M.E.
- Previous posts: Titular Bishop of Vadesi (2001–2002); Auxiliary Bishop of Davao (2001–2002)

Orders
- Ordination: April 24, 1976 by Antonio Mabutas
- Consecration: July 12, 2001 by Antonio Franco

Personal details
- Born: Guillermo Dela Vega Afable; April 3, 1951 (age 75) Davao City, Philippines
- Denomination: Roman Catholic
- Motto: In Veritate Et Misericordia
- Coat of arms

Styles of Guillermo Afable
- Reference style: His Excellency; The Most Reverend
- Spoken style: Your Excellency
- Religious style: Bishop

Guillermo Dela Vega Afable (born April 3, 1951) is a Filipino bishop of the Roman Catholic Church who has served as Bishop of Digos since 2003. Before his appointment in Digos, he served as Auxiliary Bishop of Davao from 2001 to 2002.

== Early life and education ==
Afable was born on April 3, 1951, in Davao City. He completed his elementary education at Ateneo de Davao, Matina, from 1959 to 1963 and his secondary education at the same institution from 1964 to 1968. He pursued his college studies at the St. Francis Xavier Regional Seminary from 1968 to 1972 and continued his theological formation at the same seminary from 1972 to 1976. From 1980 to 1985, he completed postgraduate studies in Liturgy in Anselmianum, Rome, Italy and a postgraduate degree in Canon Law in the Pontifical University of Saint Thomas Aquinas.

== Priesthood ==
Afable was ordained a priest at Our Lady of Fatima Parish on April 24, 1976, by Most Rev. Antonio Mabutas. From 1976 to 1978, he served as Parochial Vicar at San Pedro Cathedral Parish. From 1978 to 1980, he was the Rector of St. Francis Xavier College Seminary in Catalunan Grande. Between 1985 and 1991, he served as Parish Priest at San Pablo Parish and later became the Director of the Archdiocesan Liturgical Commission from 1986 to 1991. From 1992 to 1995, he was assigned as Parish Priest in the Solomon Islands under the Mission Society of the Philippines. From 1997 to 2001, he was the Director of Bishop Thibault Media Center. He was then appointed Parish Priest of Sacred Heart of Jesus Parish in Obrero, Davao City, from 1998 to 2001. Before becoming a bishop, he served as Vicar General of the Archdiocese of Davao from 1997 to 2002.

== Episcopal ministry ==
On April 21, 2001, Pope John Paul II appointed Afable as Auxiliary Bishop of Davao and Titular Bishop of Vadesi. He was consecrated on July 12, 2001, at San Pedro Cathedral, Davao City, by Archbishop Antonio Franco.

On April 24, 2002, he was appointed Coadjutor Bishop of Digos, and succeeded as the bishop of Digos on February 11, 2003, following the resignation of Bishop Generoso Camiña, P.M.E., for health reasons.

Within the Catholic Bishops' Conference of the Philippines, he served as Vice-chairman of the Commission on Mission from 2005 to 2011. He also served as the Regional representative of Mindanao South to the Permanent Council from 2007 to 2009 and again from 2011 to 2013.

Catholic Church titles
Preceded by Generoso Camiña	Bishop of Digos; 2003–present	Incumbent
Preceded by Nguyễn Văn Thuận	Titular Bishop of Vadesi; 2001–2002	Succeeded by Lucas Kim Woon-hoe
