= Daughters of Mary =

Daughters of Mary is the name of:

- Daughters of Mary, a congregation of religious sisters in the Syro-Malankara Catholic Church
- Daughters of Mary, Health of the Sick, a Catholic institute of women religious, founded in 1935 and dissolved in 1976.
- Daughters of Mary Help of Christians Siu Ming Catholic Secondary School, a girls' secondary school in Kwai Chung, Hong Kong
- Adèle de Batz de Trenquelléon, Catholic patroness of the Daughters of Mary Immaculate
- Daughters of Mary of the Immaculate Conception, a Catholic institute of women religious founded in 1904
- Daughters of Mary (Lutheran), a Lutheran religious order for women in the Church of Sweden
- Daughters of Mary, Mother of Our Savior, a congregation of religious sisters associated with the Society of St. Pius V
- Salesian Sisters of Don Bosco, also known as the Daughters of Mary Help of Christians, a female religious institute formed in 1872
- Teresian Daughters of Mary, a Catholic religious institute of women of diocesan right founded in Davao City, Philippines in the 1960s
- Ursuline Sisters Daughters of Mary Immaculate, a Verona-based Catholic congregation of sisters
