= Rimando =

Rimando may refer to:

== Surname ==
- George Rimando (born 1953), Filipino Roman Catholic bishop
- Nick Rimando (born 1979), American soccer player
