= Fernando Capalla =

Filipino Roman Catholic bishop (1934–2024)

The Most Reverend Fernando Capalla
- Archbishop Emeritus of Davao
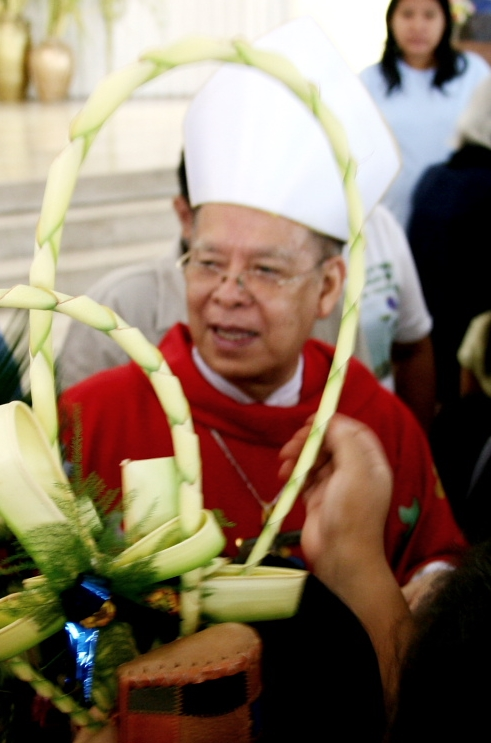
- Capalla in 2008
- See: Davao
- Installed: November 6, 1996
- Term ended: February 11, 2012
- Predecessor: Antonio L. Mabutas
- Successor: Romulo Valles
- Previous posts: Auxiliary Bishop of Davao (1975–1977); Titular Bishop of Grumentum (1975–1978); Bishop of Iligan (1982–1994)

Orders
- Ordination: March 18, 1961 by Juan Nicolasora Nilmar
- Consecration: June 18, 1975 by Bruno Torpigliani

Personal details
- Born: Fernando Robles Capalla; November 1, 1934 Leon, Iloilo, Philippine Islands
- Died: January 6, 2024 (aged 89) Davao City, Philippines
- Buried: Crypt, Davao Cathedral
- Denomination: Roman Catholic
- Education: St. Vincent Ferrer Seminary; St. John's University (New York City)
- Motto: IN SANCTITATE ET IUSTICIA
- Coat of arms

Styles of Fernando Capalla
- Reference style: The Most Reverend
- Spoken style: Your Excellency
- Religious style: Archbishop

Fernando Robles Capalla (November 1, 1934 – January 6, 2024) was a Roman Catholic archbishop-emeritus of the Archdiocese of Davao. He was succeeded by Romulo Valles as archbishop of Davao on February 11, 2012. He died on January 6, 2024, at the age of 89.

== Educational background ==
Capalla started his education at Leon Central Elementary School, and attended secondary schooling at Colegio de San Agustin in Iloilo City. He continued his studies at St. Vincent Ferrer Seminary in Jaro, Iloilo City from 1950 to 1961. He took further studies from St. John's University in New York, US, in 1967, earning an MA in English Literature.

== Priesthood ==
Capalla was ordained priest on March 18, 1961, at the age of 26 as a diocesan priest of the Archdiocese of Jaro. He was appointed auxiliary bishop of Davao on April 2, 1975, at the age of 40. He was also appointed titular bishop of Grumentum on that same date. On April 25, 1977, he was appointed bishop-prelate of Iligan City in Lanao del Norte province and subsequently appointed bishop on November 15, 1982, when it was raised to a full-fledged diocese. In 1987, Pope John Paul II appointed him Apostolic Administrator of the newly created Prelature of St. Mary's in Marawi City, Lanao del Sur.

== Archbishop of Davao ==
Capalla became the Coadjutor Archbishop of Davao on June 28, 1994. He was formally installed to lead the archdiocese as its third archbishop and metropolitan on November 28, 1996. He served as President of the Catholic Bishops' Conference of the Philippines (CBCP) for one term, from December 2003 to December 2005. Archbishop Capalla was a Council Member of the Federation of Asian Bishops Conference (FABC) and was one of the Founders/Convenors of the Bishops-Ulama Conference. For over a decade, he was a Member of the Pontifical Council for Interreligious Dialogue.

Archbishop Capalla promoted inter-religious dialogue among the tri-people of Mindanao — the Christians, the Muslims, and the Lumads. Archbishop Capalla was succeeded by Zamboanga Archbishop Romulo Valles as Primate of Davao.

== Death ==
Capalla died on January 6, 2024, in Davao City, aged 89. He was interred at the crypt of the San Pedro Cathedral.

Catholic Church titles
Preceded by Antonio Mabutas	Archbishop of Davao; November 6, 1996 – February 11, 2012	Succeeded by Romulo Valles
Preceded by Orlando Quevedo	CBCP President; 2003–2005	Succeeded by Angel Lagdameo
Preceded by First	Bishop of Iligan; 1982–1994	Succeeded by Emilio Bataclan
Preceded by Nicolas M. Mondejar	Titular Bishop of Grumentum; 1975–1978	Succeeded by Djuro Kokša
Preceded by —	Auxiliary Bishop of Davao; 1975–1977	Succeeded by —
