= Museo de Iloko =

Building and museum in La Union, Philippines

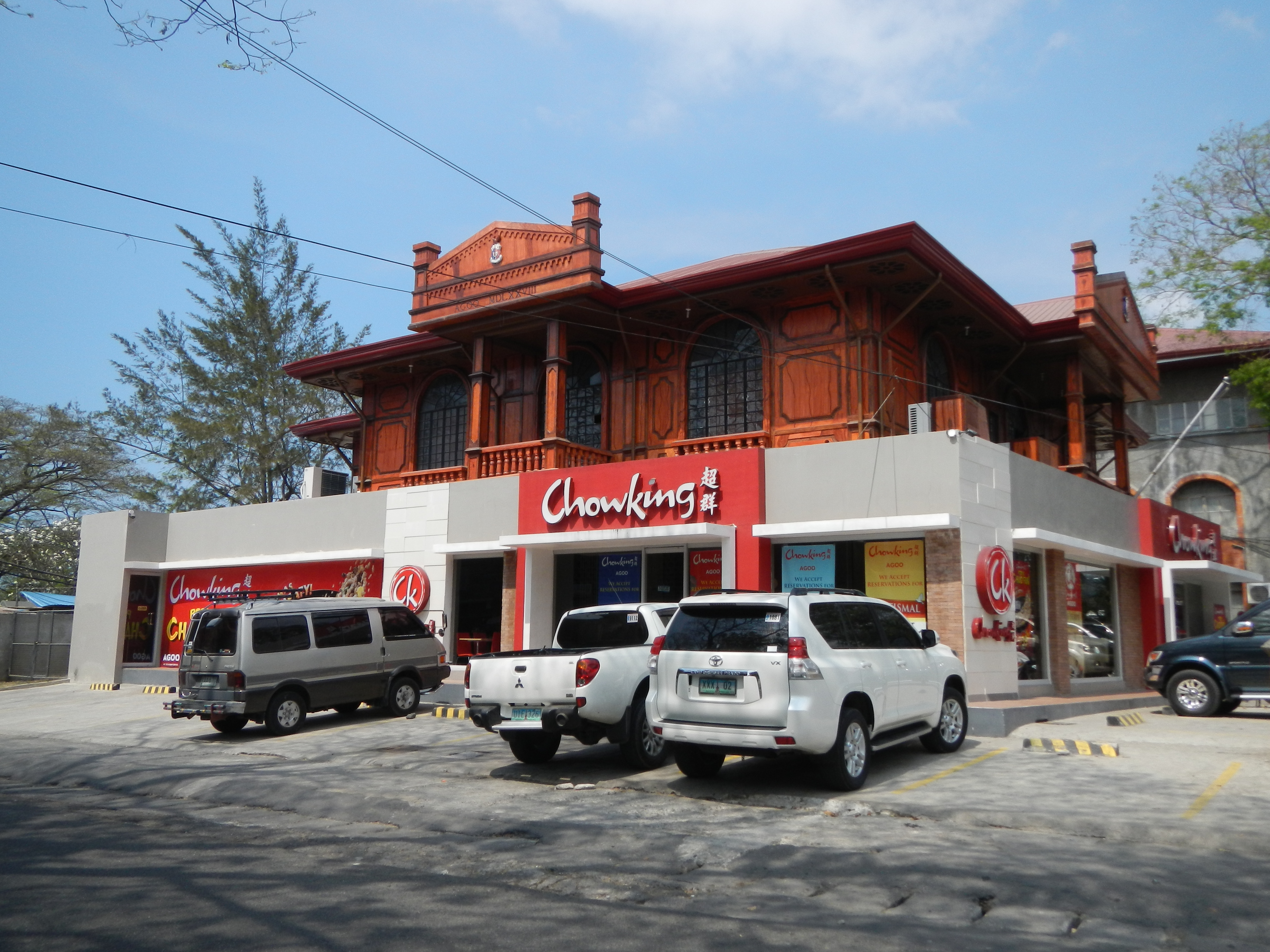
- Established: 1981
- Coordinates: 16°19′24″N 120°22′00″E
- Building details
- Former names: Agoo Presidencia
- Alternative names: Agoo Museum

General information
- Status: Completed
- Location: Agoo, La Union, Philippines

The Museo de Iloko, (also called the Agoo Museum or the Agoo Presidencia), is a heritage building and museum located in Agoo, La Union, Philippines, known for its collection of "artifacts and other pieces of cultural importance to the Ilocanos", and for being one of few surviving examples of American Colonial Era architecture in the Ilocos Region.

It is one of only two major public museums in the province of La Union. The first floor of the building was converted into a franchise of fastfood giant Chowking in 2013.

Artifacts in the museum include religious paraphernalia connected with Archbishops Mariano Madriaga and Antonio Mabutas, some personal effects of former president Elpidio Quirino, and locally excavated Ming Dynasty artifacts.

== History ==
The Museo de Iloko was originally created in the days of the American occupation as the Presidencia or municipal building of Agoo. The presidencia was renovated and converted into a museum in 1981, part of a wave of local museums created during the later days of the Marcos administration, with the influence of then-tourism minister Jose D. Aspiras.

It was severely damaged during the 1990 Luzon earthquake, so its collections were temporarily transferred to the nearest museum, the Museo de La Union in San Fernando, La Union.

The structure was repaired and restored after the earthquake, retaining its heritage design until 2013, when the local government of La Union approved the conversion of the first floor of the building into a franchise of fastfood giant Chowking.
