= Diocese of Mati =

Latin Catholic diocese in the Philippines

Diocese of Mati Dioecesis Matiensis Diócesis sa Mati Diyosesis ng Mati

Catholic
- Coat of arms

Location
- Country: Philippines
- Territory: Davao Oriental
- Ecclesiastical province: Davao
- Metropolitan: Davao
- Coordinates: 6°57′02″N 126°13′08″E

Statistics
- Area: 5,164 km^{2} (1,994 sq mi)
- Population: Total; Catholics: (as of 2021); 576,343; 352,911 (61.2%)
- Parishes: 20

Information
- Denomination: Catholic
- Sui iuris church: Latin Church
- Rite: Roman Rite
- Established: February 16, 1984
- Cathedral: San Nicolas de Tolentino Cathedral
- Secular priests: 38

Current leadership
- Pope: Leo XIV
- Bishop: Sede vacante
- Metropolitan Archbishop: Abel Apigo
- Vicar General: Msgr. Medardo A. Salomia, DCM

The Diocese of Mati (Latin: Dioecesis Matiensis) is a Latin Catholic diocese of the Catholic Church in the Philippines.

== History ==
The Christianization of the Davao area in Mindanao is attributed to the arrival in the area of the Augustinian Missionaries in 1848. This was followed by the Jesuits and the P.M.E Fathers of Quebec. But it was the Maryknoll Fathers who finally arrived in the area in 1958 and settled down to the arduous task of evangelizing the inhabitants.

Early Spanish exploration of the Davao area can be traced back to 1528 when Saavedra visited the Sarangani Islands on the southwestern entrance to the Davao Gulf. He coasted along the shores of Davao Oriental where he established the first settlement, that of Caraga.

The early missionaries later settled in places like Caraga, Baganga, Cateel and the nearby areas, baptizing, giving the sacraments, building churches and convents. Some of these old structures can still be found today, and some of them are still serving their Christian communities.

The entire Davao Province was politically subdivided into three in 1967. From this subdivision emerged the provinces of Davao del Norte with Tagum as its capital, Davao del Sur with Digos as capital, and Davao Oriental with Mati as capital.

Ecclesiastically, the entire Mindanao area was under the Diocese of Cebu since 1595, until some parts were placed under the jurisdiction of Jaro in 1865.

In 1910 the Diocese of Zamboanga was created and took all ecclesiastical territories in Mindanao away from Cebu. Other dioceses were established over the years, including the then Prelature of Davao which eventually became a diocese. In 1962 the Prelature of Tagum was created, taking its territory mostly from the then Prelature of Davao.

On February 16, 1984, Pope John Paul II created the new Diocese of Mati, taking part of its territory from that of the Diocese of Tagum. In November of the same year, Patricio Hacbang Alo, until then the Auxiliary Bishop of Davao, was appointed as the first Bishop of Mati. Meanwhile, the Diocese of Davao had become an archdiocese, and Tagum and Mati were made its suffragans.

The diocese has experienced no jurisdictional changes, and is currently a suffragan of the Archdiocese of Davao.

The first bishop was Patricio Hacbang Alo. He was born on December 2, 1939, in Cebu City. He was ordained a priest on March 14, 1964 of the Archdiocese of Cebu and was appointed Auxiliary Bishop of the Archdiocese of Davao on April 14, 1981. His episcopal ordination was on June 7, 1981. Pope John Paul II appointed him as the first bishop of the Diocese of Mati on November 9, 1984 and retired on October 19, 2014 after reaching the mandatory age of 75 and for serving the diocese for almost 30 years.

For more than 3 years, the diocese was sede vacante until Pope Francis has appointed Abel Apigo as its new bishop on February 10, 2018. He hailed from Davao City and was ordained priest on April 18, 1994. He was officially installed as the Bishop of Mati on April 25, 2018.

== Religious institutes ==
=== Men ===
- Salesian Society of Don Bosco (SDB)
- Society of Divine Vocation (SDV)
- Order of St. Camillus (MI)
- Order of San Agustin (OSA)

=== Women ===
- Dominican Sisters of the Most Holy Rosary (OP)
- Order of the Most Blessed Virgin Mary of Mt. Carmel (OCD)
- Missionaries of the Immaculate Conception (MIC)
- Carmelite Missionaries (CM)
- Order of Saint Ursula (OSU)
- Living the Gospel Community Sisters (LGC)
- Catechists of St. Joseph (CSJ)
- Theresian Daughters of Mary (TDM)
- Religious of the Virgin Mary (RVM)

== Ordinaries ==
No	Name	In office	Coat of arms
1.	Patricio Hacbang Alo	1984–2014	
2.	Abel Cahiles Apigo	2018–2026	

== See also ==
- Catholic Church in the Philippines
