= Diocese of Digos =

Latin Catholic diocese in the Philippines

Coordinates: 6.7539°N 125.3561°E

Diocese of Digos Dioecesis Digosensis Diócesis sa Digos Diyosesis ng Digos

Catholic
- Coat of arms

Location
- Country: Philippines
- Territory: Davao del Sur, Davao de Oro and Davao Occidental
- Ecclesiastical province: Davao
- Metropolitan: Davao

Statistics
- Area: 4,327 km^{2} (1,671 sq mi)
- Population: Total; Catholics: (as of 2021); 1,215,000; 830,000 (68.3%)
- Parishes: 22

Information
- Denomination: Catholic
- Sui iuris church: Latin Church
- Rite: Roman Rite
- Established: November 5, 1979
- Cathedral: Cathedral of Mary, Mother and Mediatrix of Grace
- Patron saint: St. Isidore the Laborer
- Secular priests: 34

Current leadership
- Pope: Leo XIV
- Bishop: Guillermo Dela Vega Afable
- Metropolitan Archbishop: Romulo Valles

The Diocese of Digos (Latin: Dioecesis Digosensis) is a Latin Catholic diocese of the Catholic Church in the Philippines. Erected in 1979, the diocese was created from territory in the Archdiocese of Davao. The diocese has experienced no jurisdictional changes, and is currently a suffragan of the archdiocese.

The current bishop is Guillermo Dela Vega Afable, appointed in 2003. The provinces of Davao del Sur, Davao de Oro and Davao Occidental are under the jurisdiction of the diocese.

== Ordinaries ==
Bishop		Period in Office	Coat of Arms
1.	Generoso C. Camiña, P.M.E. †	1979–2003	
2.	Guillermo Dela Vega Afable	2003 – present	

== Affiliated Bishops ==
- Ronald Lunas, appointed 5th Bishop of the Diocese of Pagadian from 2018-2024

== See also ==
- Catholic Church in the Philippines
