= Ruben Labajo =

Filipino Catholic bishop (born 1966)

His Excellency, The Most Reverend Ruben C. Labajo D.D.
- Bishop of Prosperidad
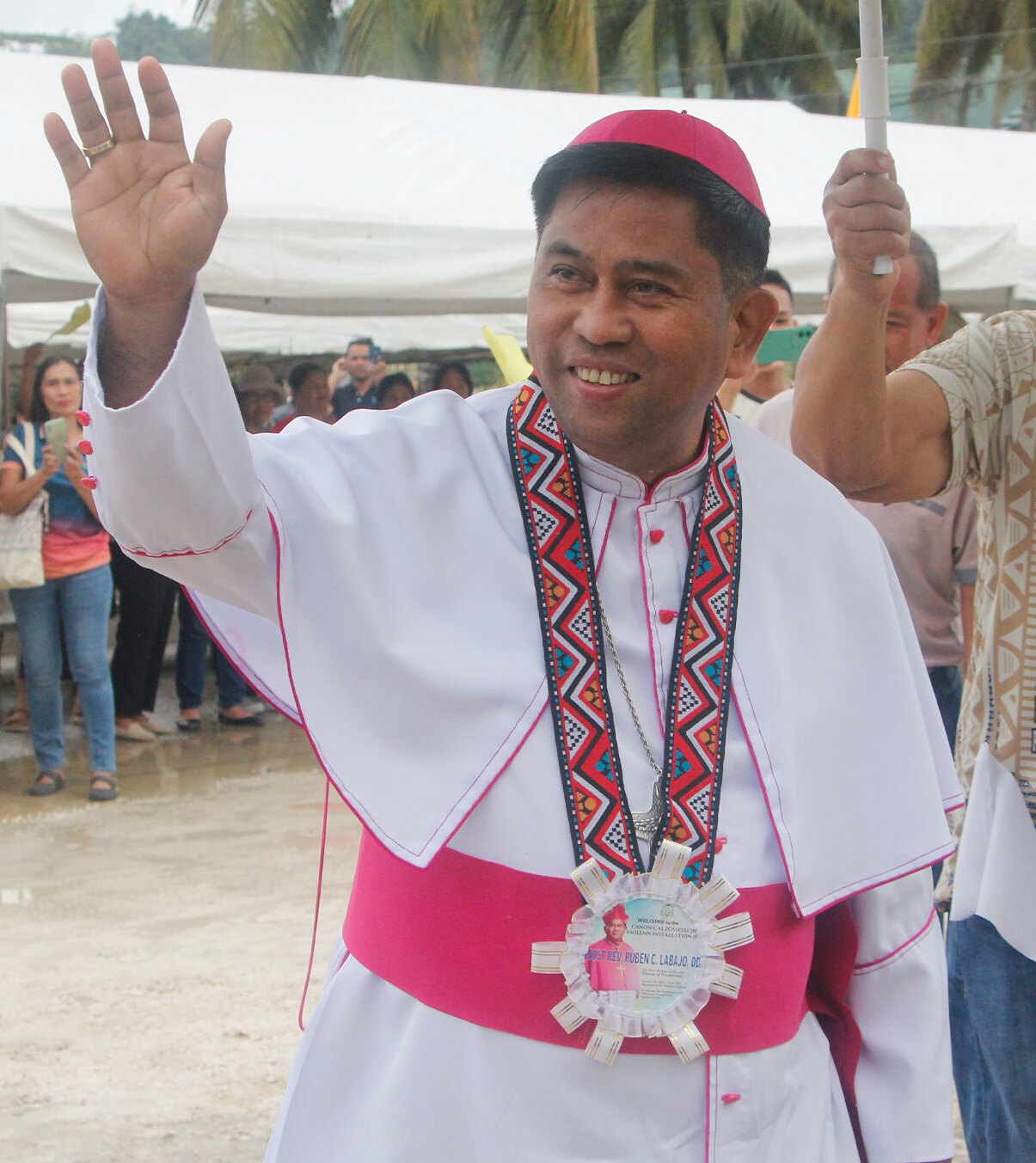
- Labajo in 2025
- Province: Cagayan de Oro
- See: Prosperidad
- Appointed: October 15, 2024
- Installed: January 28, 2025
- Previous post: Auxiliary Bishop of Cebu (2022–2025)

Orders
- Ordination: June 10, 1994 by Ricardo Vidal
- Consecration: August 19, 2022 by Jose Serofia Palma

Personal details
- Born: Ruben Caballero Labajo; September 24, 1966 (age 60) Talisay, Cebu, Philippines
- Denomination: Catholic
- Education: San Carlos Seminary College (BA); Seminaryo Mayor de San Carlos (MA)
- Motto: Humiliter ambulare coram deo (Latin for 'To walk humbly before God')
- Coat of arms: Ruben C. Labajo's coat of arms

Ordination history
History
Priestly ordination
- Ordained by: Ricardo Vidal
Episcopal consecration
- Principal consecrator: José S. Palma
- Co-consecrators: Charles John Brown; Dennis Villarojo
- Styles
- Reference style: His Excellency; The Most Reverend
- Spoken style: Your Excellency
- Religious style: Bishop, Monsignor

Ruben Caballero Labajo (born September 24, 1966) is a Filipino Catholic prelate who previously served as the Auxiliary Bishop of the Archdiocese of Cebu from 2022 to 2025. He is currently—and the first bishop of–the newly erected Diocese of Prosperidad.

== Early life ==
Labajo was born on September 24, 1966, in Talisay, Cebu, Philippines, to parents Bienvenido and Violeta Labajo. Labajo spent his formation years as a seminarian at the San Carlos Seminary College, where he obtained his degree in Philosophy. He then continued his theological studies at the Seminario Mayor de San Carlos, where he obtained his master's degree in philosophy.

== Ministry ==
=== Priesthood ===
Labajo was ordained a priest on June 10, 1994, at the Our Lady of Guadalupe Parish at Talisay, by the former and late Cebu Archbishop Ricardo Cardinal Vidal. Labajo was ordained together with current Malolos Bishop Dennis Villarojo, who would later become a co-consecrator in his consecration rites in 2022.

His first assignment was as a Parochial Vicar in Mandaue City, where he spent the first two years of his priestly vocation. In 1997, he was assigned as a Parish Priest in Santa Fe Parish, in Bantayan Island, where he served until 2006. In 2007, Labajo's next assignment was as a Team Moderator at the St. Joseph the Worker Parish in Tabunok, Talisay until 2014.

Between 2014 and 2017, Labajo served on another post as a Moderator of Team of Pastors at the Cebu Metropolitan Cathedral. In 2017, he became the Episcopal Vicar of the First District of Metropolitan Cebu, and became a member of the diocese's presbyteral council.

Before Labajo became the Vicar General of the Archdiocese of Cebu in 2019, he also held another post as the Vicar Forane of the Vicariate of the Most Holy Rosary, where he served for five years from 2014 to 2019.

=== Episcopate ===
Pope Francis appointed Labajo as the Auxiliary Bishop of Cebu on June 23, 2022. He was also assigned a titular see at Abbir Maius. He was consecrated on August 19, 2022, by Cebu Archbishop Jose Palma, with the Papal Nuncio to the Philippines Charles John Brown, and Malolos Bishop Dennis Villarojo acting as co-consecrators.

On October 15, 2024, Pope Francis appointed Labajo as the first bishop of the newly erected Diocese of Prosperidad, a territory which was carved out of the Diocese of Butuan. On January 28, 2025, the feast day of Saint Thomas Aquinas, Labajo was formally installed as the Bishop of Prosperidad at the Saint Michael the Archangel Cathedral in Prosperidad.

==== Coat of arms ====
Coat of arms as Auxiliary Bishop

== See also ==
- Roman Catholic Diocese of Prosperidad
- List of Catholic Bishops in the Philippines

Catholic Church titles
Preceded by Michael Andrew Gielen	— TITULAR — Bishop of Abbir Maius; August 19, 2022 – October 15, 2024	Vacant
New diocese	Bishop of Prosperidad; January 28, 2025 – present	Incumbent
