= Patricio Hacbang Alo =

Filipino Catholic bishop (1939–2021)

- Bishop of Mati
- Church: Catholic Church
- Diocese: Diocese of Mati
- In office: 9 November 1984 – 19 October 2014
- Predecessor: Diocese erected
- Successor: Abel Apigo
- Previous posts: Titular Bishop of Thibiuca (1981-1984); Auxiliary Bishop of Davao (1981-1984)

Orders
- Ordination: 14 March 1964 by Julio Rosales
- Consecration: 7 June 1981 by Julio Rosales

Personal details
- Born: 2 December 1939 Cebu City, Cebu, Commonwealth of the Philippines
- Died: 13 April 2021 (aged 81)

Patricio Hacbang Alo (2 December 1939 – 13 April 2021) was a Filipino Catholic bishop.

Alo was born in the Philippines and was ordained to the priesthood in 1964. He served as auxiliary bishop of the Archdiocese of Davao, Philippines from 1981 to 1984 and was bishop of the Diocese of Mati from 1984 to 2014.

Alo died from COVID-19 in 2021.
