= Diocese of Prosperidad =

Latin Catholic diocese in the Philippines

Diocese of Prosperidad Dioecesis Prosperitatis Diyosesis hong Prosperidad Diyosesis sa Prosperidad Diyosesis ng Prosperidad Diócesis de Prosperidad

Catholic
- Coat of arms

Location
- Country: Philippines
- Territory: Agusan del Sur
- Ecclesiastical province: Cagayan de Oro

Statistics
- Area: 9,989.52 km^{2} (3,856.98 sq mi)
- Population: Total; Catholics: (as of 2024); 739,367; 486,251 (65.8%)
- Parishes: 26

Information
- Denomination: Catholic Church
- Sui iuris church: Latin Church
- Rite: Roman Rite
- Established: October 15, 2024; 10 months ago
- Cathedral: Saint Michael the Archangel Cathedral Parish
- Patron saint: Michael the Archangel
- Secular priests: 32 (and 29 religious priests)

Current leadership
- Pope: Leo XIV
- Bishop: Ruben C. Labajo
- Metropolitan Archbishop: José A. Cabantan
- Vicar General: Isaleo C. Madelo
- All current statistics are based from updated data taken by Catholic-Hierarchy.org.

The Diocese of Prosperidad is a diocese of the Latin Church of the Catholic Church in the Philippines. It was established on October 15, 2024, with its territory comprising the province of Agusan del Sur.

== History ==
During a preliminary assembly on July 9, 2023, in Kalibo, Aklan, the Catholic Bishops Conference of the Philippines voted in favor of the proposal of Bishop Cosme Almedilla of Butuan for the separation from Butuan of a new diocese that will cover the province of Agusan del Sur, which is considered a “missionary frontier” with a third of its population being indigenous peoples.

The new diocese was carved out of the Diocese of Butuan on October 15, 2024, becoming the Philippines' 87th diocese. Ruben Labajo, an auxiliary bishop from the Archdiocese of Cebu, was appointed by Pope Francis to be its first bishop. The rite of canonical possession-installation was solemnly held at Saint Michael the Archangel Cathedral in Prosperidad on January 28, 2025.

== Ordinaries ==
Bishop		Period in office	Notes	Coat of Arms
1	Ruben Caballero Labajo	January 28, 2025 – present (227 days)	Former Auxiliary Bishop of Cebu	

== See also ==
- Catholic Church in the Philippines
- Prosperidad
