= Diocese of Tagum =

Roman Catholic diocese in the Philippines

Diocese of Tagum Dioecesis Tagamna Diócesis sa Tagum Diyosesis ng Tagum

Catholic
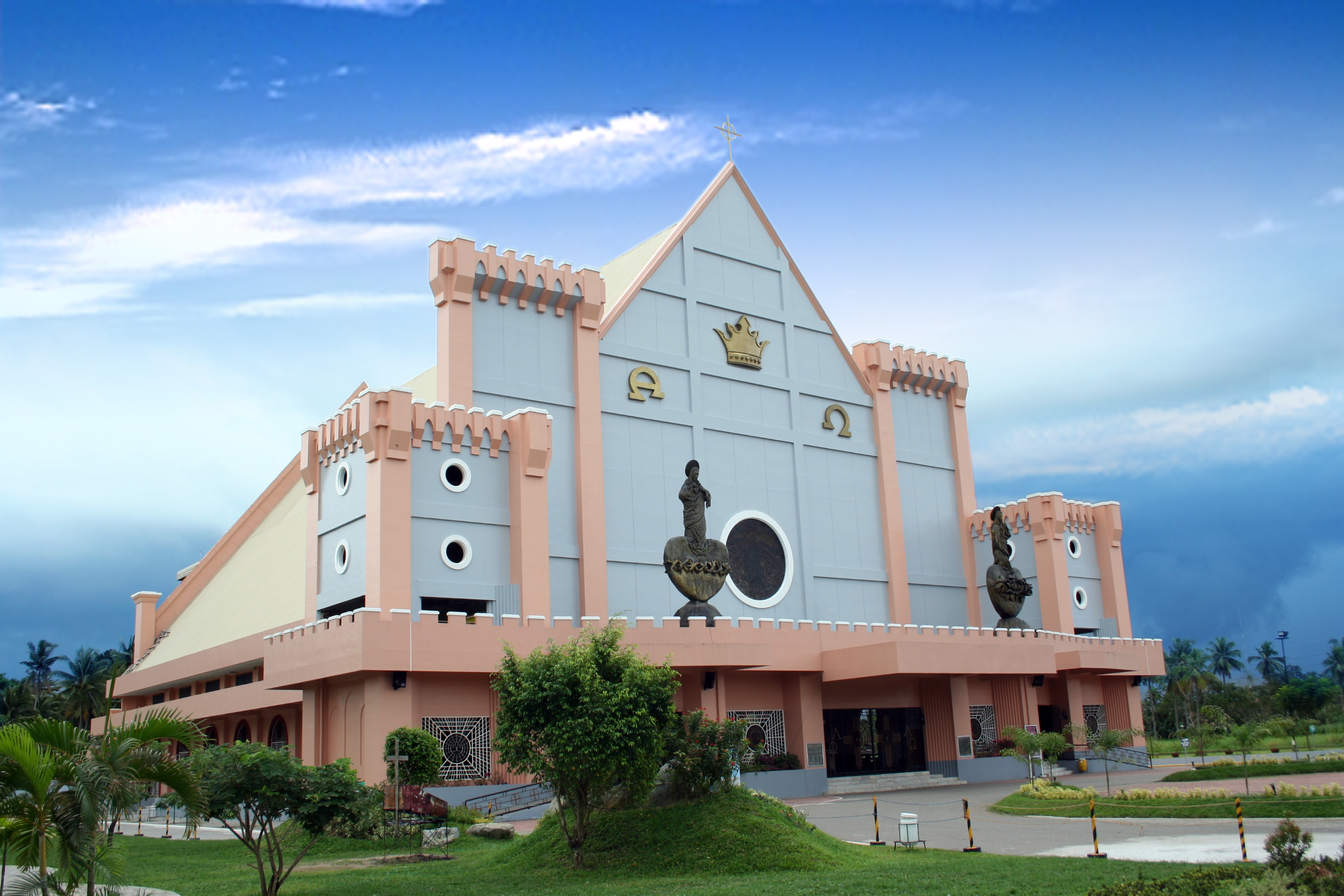
- Tagum Cathedral

- Coat of arms

Location
- Country: Philippines
- Territory: Davao del Norte (except Samal) and Davao de Oro
- Ecclesiastical province: Davao
- Metropolitan: Davao
- Coordinates: 7°26′27″N 125°48′00″E

Statistics
- Area: 8,129 km^{2} (3,139 sq mi)
- Population: Total; Catholics: (as of 2021); 1,892,604; 1,384,000 (73.1%)
- Parishes: 89

Information
- Denomination: Catholic
- Sui iuris church: Latin Church
- Rite: Roman Rite
- Established: January 13, 1962 (as prelature); October 11, 1980 (as diocese)
- Cathedral: Cathedral of Christ the King
- Titular patron: Christ the King
- Secular priests: 143

Current leadership
- Pope: Leo XIV
- Bishop: Medel Sacay Aseo
- Metropolitan Archbishop: Romulo Valles

Website
- Diocese of Tagum

The Diocese of Tagum (Latin: Dioecesis Tagamna) is a Latin Church diocese of the Catholic Church in the Philippines. It is a suffragan of the Archdiocese of Davao. It was canonically erected as Prelature Nullius on January 13, 1962, by Pope John XXIII, with Joseph Regan M.M. as its local ordinary. It was elevated to the status of a diocese on October 11, 1980, by Pope John Paul II, who appointed Pedro Dean as its first Filipino bishop ordinary, and Ramon Villena as the auxiliary bishop.

The diocesan territory comprises the entire civil provinces of Davao del Norte (except the city of Samal, the southern portion of the Lasang River) and Davao de Oro.

== Religious institute of men ==
At the moment there is only one religious institute of men present in the diocese. These are the missionary priests who operate a school in Tagum City. They are called Congregation of the Schools of Charity "Cavanis Fathers" (CSCH) which is housed at Letran de Davao High School, Seminary Drive, Tagum City.

== Religious institutes of women ==
- Handmaids of Christ the King (ACR)
- Hospitaller Sisters of Mercy (SOM)
- Daughters of Mary of the Assumption (FMA)
- Dominican Sisters of the Most Holy Rosary of the Philippines (OP)
- Dominican Sisters of Regina Rosary (OP-Regina)
- Dominican Sisters of the Trinity (OP)
- Order of the Most Holy Savior of Saint Bridget (OSsS)
- Religious of the Virgin Mary (RVM)
- Teresian Daughters of Mary (TDM)

== Bishops ==
=== Ordinaries ===
Bishop		Period in office	Coat of arms
1.	Joseph William Regan, M.M.	1962–1980	
2.	Pedro Rosales Dean	1980–1985	
3.	Wilfredo Dasco Manlapaz	1986–2018	
3.	Medel Sacay Aseo	2018–present	

=== Auxiliary bishops ===
Bishop		Period in office	Coat of arms
1.	Ramon Barrera Villena	1982-1985	

== See also ==
- Catholic Church in the Philippines
