= Romulo Valles =

Filipino Archbishop of Davao

The Most Reverend Romulo Valles
- Metropolitan Archbishop Emeritus of Davao
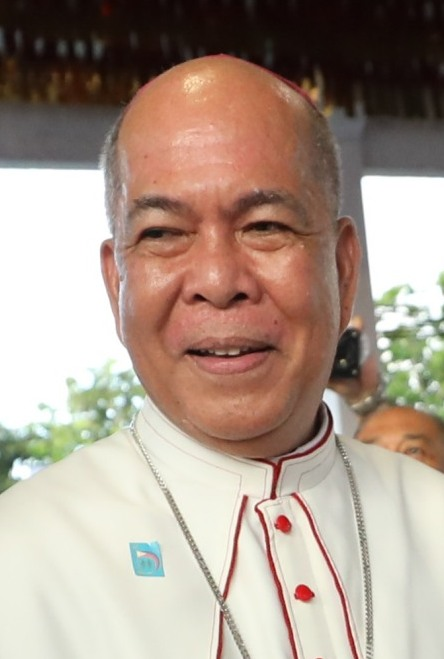
- Valles in 2018
- Province: Davao
- See: Davao
- Appointed: February 11, 2012
- Installed: May 22, 2012
- Retired: November 9, 2026
- Predecessor: Fernando Capalla
- Successor: Mons. Abel Apigo
- Previous posts: Archbishop of Zamboanga (2006–2012); President of the Catholic Bishops' Conference of the Philippines (2017–2021)

Orders
- Ordination: April 6, 1976
- Consecration: August 6, 1997 by Gian Vincenzo Moreni

Personal details
- Born: Romulo Geolina Valles; July 10, 1951 (age 75) Maribojoc, Bohol, Philippines
- Education: St. Francis Xavier Regional Major Seminary, Davao City; Pontifical Athenaeum of Saint Anselm

Styles of Romulo Valles
- Reference style: The Most Reverend
- Spoken style: Your Excellency
- Religious style: Archbishop

Romulo Geolina Valles (born July 10, 1951), is a Filipino prelate of the Catholic Church. He was Metropolitan Archbishop of Davao from 2012 to 2026 and was the president of the Catholic Bishops' Conference of the Philippines from 2017 to 2021. He was the former metropolitan archbishop of Zamboanga before being appointed to the Davao see.

== Biography ==
He was ordained a priest on April 6, 1976, at the age of 24. On August 6, 1997, aged 46, he was elevated to a bishop, and appointed to Kidapawan, Philippines. After 9 years, he was elevated to Metropolitan Archbishop of Zamboanga on November 13, 2006. He was appointed Archbishop of Davao on February 12, 2012, Valles took over the Davao archdiocese from Archbishop Fernando Capalla, 77, whose resignation has been accepted by the pontiff. The new archbishop was installed in a solemn liturgical rite of reception in which he canonically took possession of the metropolitan cathedral church, the San Pedro Cathedral, on May 22, 2012, in the presence of Papal Nuncio to the Philippines, Archbishop Giuseppe Pinto, cardinals, other archbishops, bishops, priests, and laity from Davao City, and all over the country.

Valles was elected on July 8, 2017, as President of the Catholic Bishops' Conference of the Philippines, succeeding Lingayen-Dagupan Archbishop Socrates Villegas, assuming the post on December 1, 2017. He was reelected to the same position in 2019.

On May 23, 2020, Valles suffered a mild stroke and was hospitalized until July 6 due to an acquired hospital pneumonia. Pablo Virgilio David, vice-president of the CBCP, was temporarily appointed acting president. In July 2021, David was elected president by the CBCP and succeeded Valles assuming the position last December 1, 2021.

On April 23, 2022, Ateneo de Davao University President Joel Tabora conferred upon Valles the Doctor of Humanities Honoris Causa on the event of the 72nd Commencement Exercises of the University, the second event of its kind done virtually.

Following the arrest of Rodrigo Duterte in 2025, Valles said "Justice…must be pursued with fairness and integrity. It must remain free from partisan political motivations or personal vendettas", and offered prayers for Duterte and his family while reiterating calls for accountability.

On November 9, 2026, Pope Leo XIV accepted his resignation and appointed Abel Cahiles Apigo, Bishop of Mati, as his successor.

Catholic Church titles
| Preceded by Juan de Dios Pueblos | Bishop of Kidapawan; 1997–2006 | Succeeded by Romulo T. Dela Cruz |
| Preceded by Carmelo Morelos | Archbishop of Zamboanga; 2006–2012 | Succeeded by Romulo T. Dela Cruz |
| Preceded by Fernando Capalla | Archbishop of Davao; 2012–2026 | Succeeded by Abel Apigo |
| Preceded by Socrates Villegas | CBCP President; 2017–2021 | Succeeded by Pablo Virgilio David |
