= Teresian Daughters of Mary =

Religious institute in the Philippines

The Teresian Daughters of Mary is a religious institute of women of diocesan right founded in Davao City, Philippines in the 1960s by the local ordinary of the then Diocese of Davao. The group has the archbishop of the Roman Catholic Archdiocese of Davao as their bishop-protector to continue their existence and ministering to various convents spread all over the country. Its foundation was for the purpose of responding to the needs of spiritual growth among the peoples of the vast territory of the newly created diocese covering the entire Davao region. The sisters were recruited and trained to serve in the local church which was lacking religious workers for its different ministries, particularly catechisms, women formation, youth formation, tribal Filipinos ministry, among others.

The sisters work in different diocese all over the Philippines. The number of perpetually professed sisters reached more than 50 and maybe considered sooner to become a religious institute of pontifical rights which means they could have their own constitution and chapter as a regular congregation of the Catholic Church. They maintain communities in the dioceses of Digos, Mati, San Fernando in La Union, Jaro, and of course in Davao. They are in charge of schools, retreat houses, community development programs and other ministries as requested by the local bishop.
