= Antonio Mabutas =

The Most Reverend Antonio Mabutas J.C.D., D.D.
- Archbishop of Davao
- Province: Davao
- Diocese: Davao
- See: Davao
- Installed: 9 December 1972
- Term ended: 6 November 1996
- Predecessor: Clovis Thibault
- Successor: Fernando Capalla
- Other post: Bishop of Laoag

Orders
- Ordination: 6 April 1946
- Consecration: 5 June 1961 by Salvatore Siino

Personal details
- Born: 13 June 1921 Agoo, La Union, Philippine Islands
- Died: 22 April 1999 (aged 77) Davao City
- Coat of arms

Styles of Antonio Lloren Mabutas
- Reference style: His Excellency
- Spoken style: Monsignor

Antonio Lloren Mabutas (13 June 1921 – 22 April 1999) was the first bishop of Diocese of Laoag and the second Archbishop of the Archdiocese of Davao. He succeeded Clovis Thibault, PME on 9 December 1972. He was also the President of the Catholic Bishops' Conference of the Philippines from 1981 to 1985.

Although he was considered a conservative within the Catholic Church hierarchy, Mabutas is noted to be the first Roman Catholic Archbishop to write a pastoral letter to criticize human rights violations under the Marcos dictatorship.

== Ordination ==
Born in Agoo, La Union, he was ordained priest on 6 April 1946 at the young age of 24.

== Bishop of Laoag ==
On 5 June 1961 he was appointed bishop of Laoag and was ordained a month after.

During this time, Mabutas became personally acquainted with then-Senator Ferdinand Marcos, who had begun his political career in Laoag. The two remained on speaking terms throughout their lives, despite Mabutas' later misgivings about the human rights abuses of the Marcos dictatorship.

== Archbishop of Davao ==
Before becoming as Archbishop of Davao, the then-Most Rev. Antonio Ll. Mabutas was appointed coadjutor archbishop of Davao with Most Rev. Clovis Thibault, PME, JCL, DD as its first Archbishop. This was during the time the Diocese of Davao was elevated to the status of an Archdiocese. Before becoming the Archbishop of Davao, he served as titular archbishop of Valeria on 25 July 1970. He succeeded as the archbishop of Davao on 9 December 1972.

=== Confronting the Marcos dictatorship's abuses ===
A 1979 pastoral letter Archbishop Mabutas wrote addressing martial law, titled "Reign of Terror in the Countryside", cited human rights abuses and killings of church workers and is notable for having been the first pastoral to be written against Marcos' administration.

Archbishop Mabutas' familiarity with President Marcos from the days when they were both serving in Laoag meant that the Marcos administration paid attention to Mabutas' complaints, sending Deputy Defense Minister Carmelo Barbero to speak with the Archbishop in a public forum in August 1979, where Mabutas laid down suggestions for changes in the way Martial Law was implemented. The "Mabutas-Barbero hearings" were covered by the international press, including Time magazine, and helped push for Mabutas' proposed changes because they had now been brought up to the court of international public opinion.

== Catholic Bishops' Conference of the Philippines president ==
Archbishop Mabutas was also the President of the Catholic Bishops' Conference of the Philippines from 1981 to 1985.

== Retirement and death ==
He retired as archbishop of Davao on 6 November 1996. He died two and half years later at the age of 77 where he served as a priest for 53 years and a bishop for 37 years.

== Legacy ==
Some of Archbishop Mabutas' effects have been preserved, and are viewable to the public at the Museo de Iloko in his hometown of Agoo, La Union.

== See also ==
- Davao City
- Agoo, La Union
- Museo de Iloko
- Religious sector resistance against the Marcos dictatorship

Catholic Church titles
Preceded by Position Established	Bishop of Laoag; 1961–1970	Succeeded by Rafael Montiano Lim
Preceded by Jaime Sin	Catholic Bishops' Conference of the Philippines; 1981–1985	Succeeded by Ricardo Vidal
Preceded by Clovis Thibault	Archbishop of Davao; 1972–1996	Succeeded by Fernando Capalla
