= Davao Cathedral =

Roman Catholic church in Davao City, Philippines

San Pedro Cathedral
- San Pedro Cathedral Parish
- San Pedro Apostol Cathedral
- Catedral Metropolitana de San Pedro (Spanish)
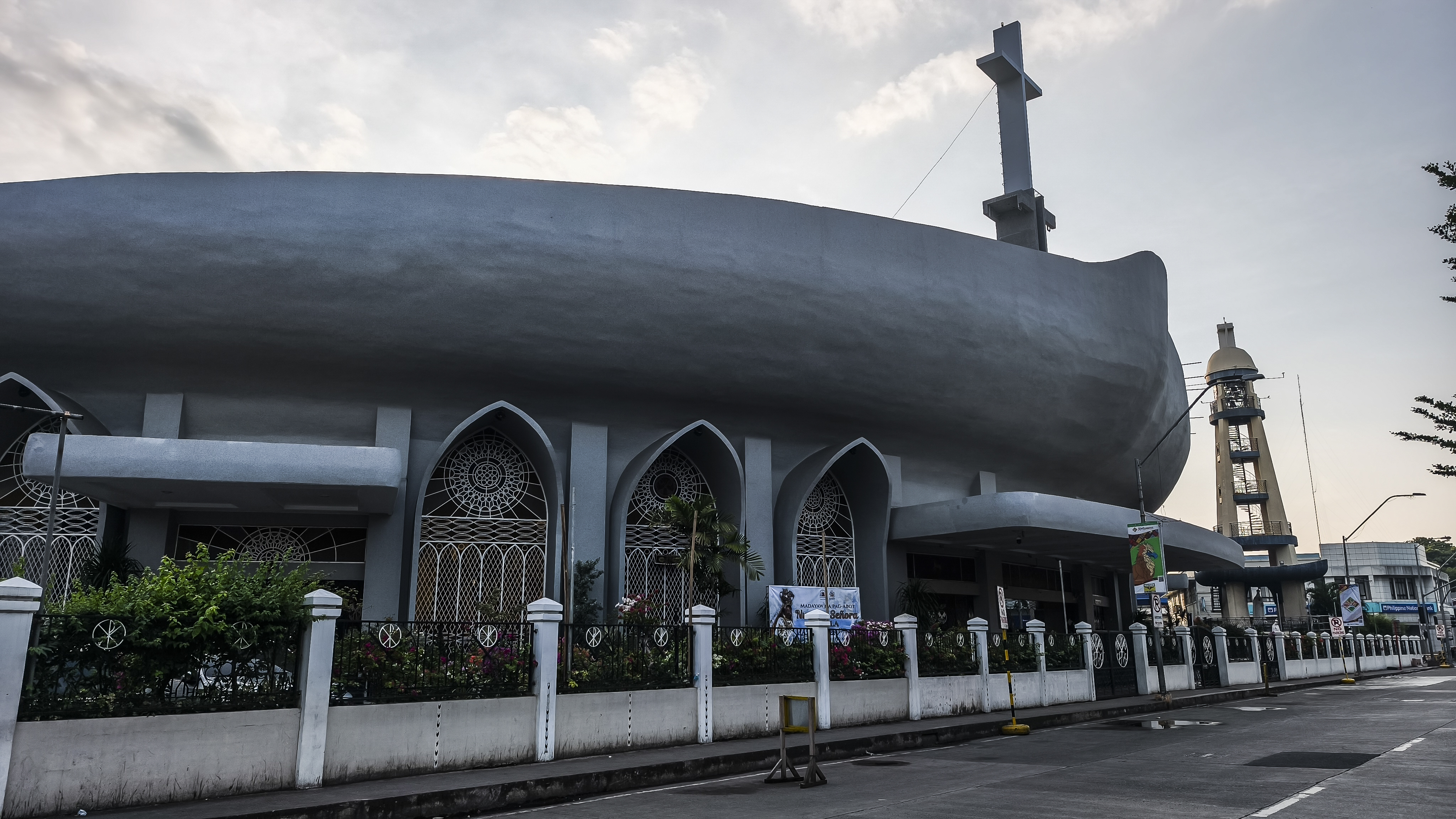
- Cathedral facade in 2026

- Location in Mindanao Location in the Philippines
- 7°03′53″N 125°36′34″E
- Location: Davao City
- Country: Philippines
- Denomination: Roman Catholic

History
- Status: Cathedral
- Dedication: Saint Peter

Architecture
- Functional status: Active
- Architectural type: Church building
- Style: Modern

Specifications
- Materials: Gravel, cement, steel, concrete

Administration
- Archdiocese: Davao

Clergy
- Archbishop: Abel C. Apigo, DD

San Pedro Cathedral Parish, also known as the Metropolitan Cathedral of San Pedro, is a Roman Catholic cathedral located at Barangay 2-A, Poblacion District, Davao City, Philippines. The cathedral, dedicated to Saint Peter, is the ecclesiastical seat of the Archdiocese of Davao.

== History ==
An earlier church, said to have been in Neo-Gothic style, was built in the same area as the current cathedral in 1847. In the 1960s, due to its small size, the Diocese of Davao solicited funds to enlarge the church. Architect Chiew was responsible for the design of the new church, which was that of an ark, hence the pointed front where the cross stands. A separate bell tower was also constructed. The cathedral has been a witness to two bombing incidents: an incident in 1981 which killed 17 people, and one in 1993 with seven deaths.

== Style and architecture ==
The church was first built using nipa and bamboo in 1847 and was subsequently rebuilt in wood in the mid-1900s by architect Ramon Basa using the distinctly modern Philippine barn-style influenced by Spanish architecture. The structure was praised for its fresh-looking facade, but as the population of Davao wasn't as big at the time, the church was small compared to other main regional churches in the country. Hence, in 1964, the wooden church was demolished and remodeled into a concrete-looking structure by architect Manuel Chiew to expand it. The diocese hired Chiew though in the design formulation for the church, many opposed his design since Chiew's new gloomy concrete design was not aesthetically-pleasing and was visually gloomy for an archdiocese cathedral. The model also made the church look smaller due to the low disproportionate facade. When the church was almost finished and the real design was fully visualized, it was too late to halt the construction which was paid by the diocese through public donations. Of the many cathedrals in the Philippines, Davao Cathedral remains as one of least notable in the country due to its current structure. There have been calls to remodel the cathedral into the indigenous earthquake-baroque architecture or other pleasant-looking designs known in the Philippines.

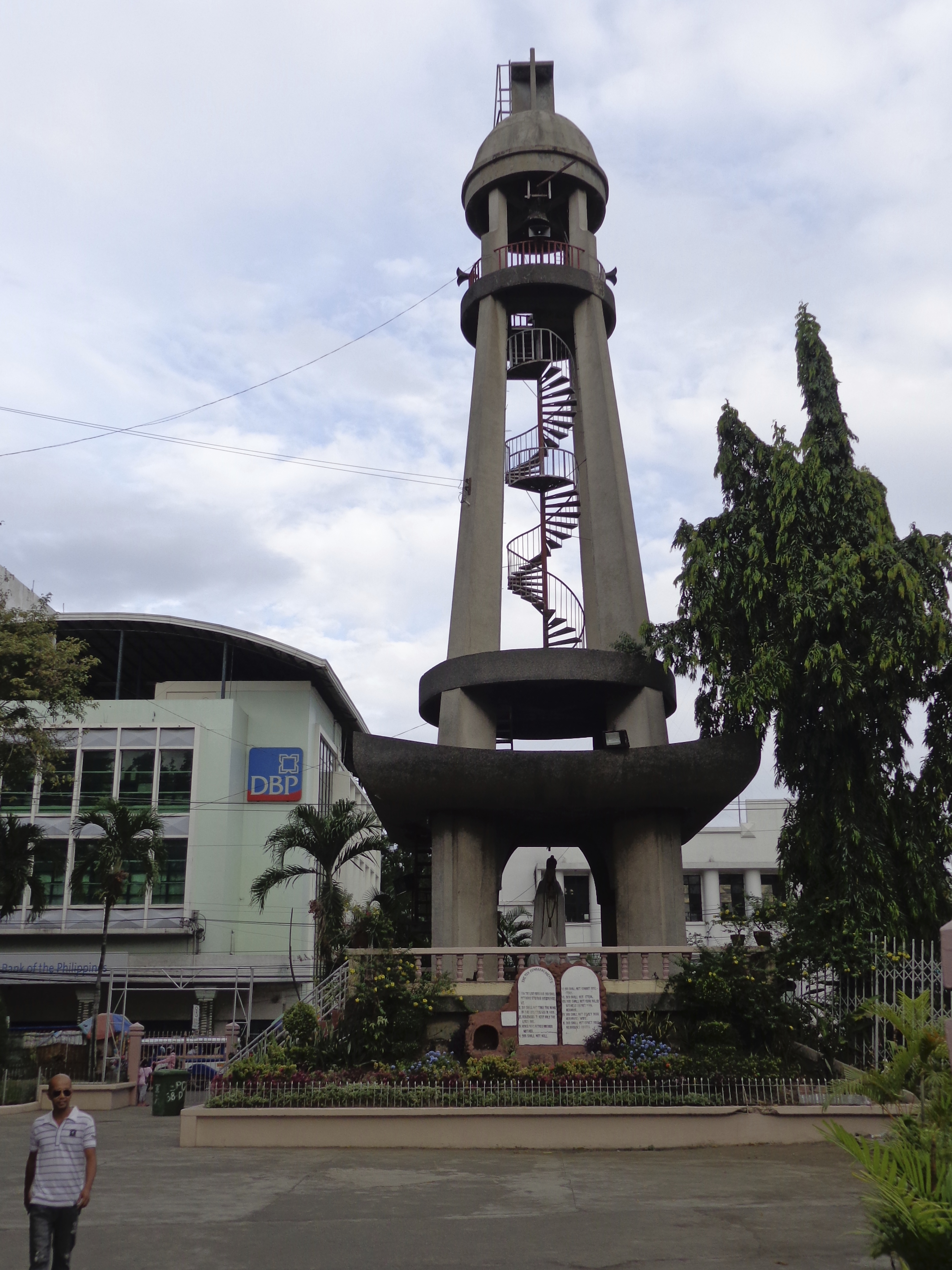
Bell tower

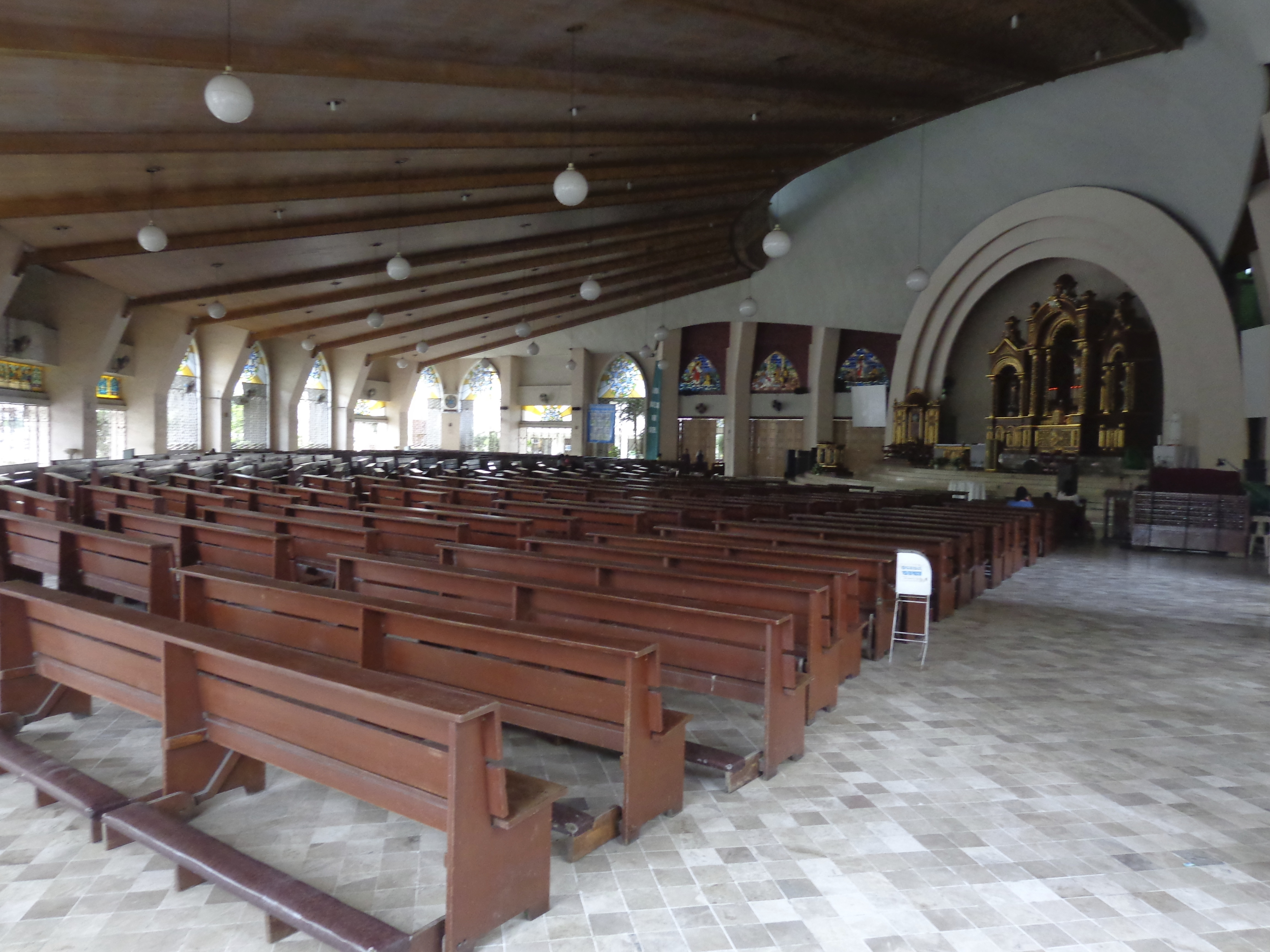
Cathedral interior in 2013

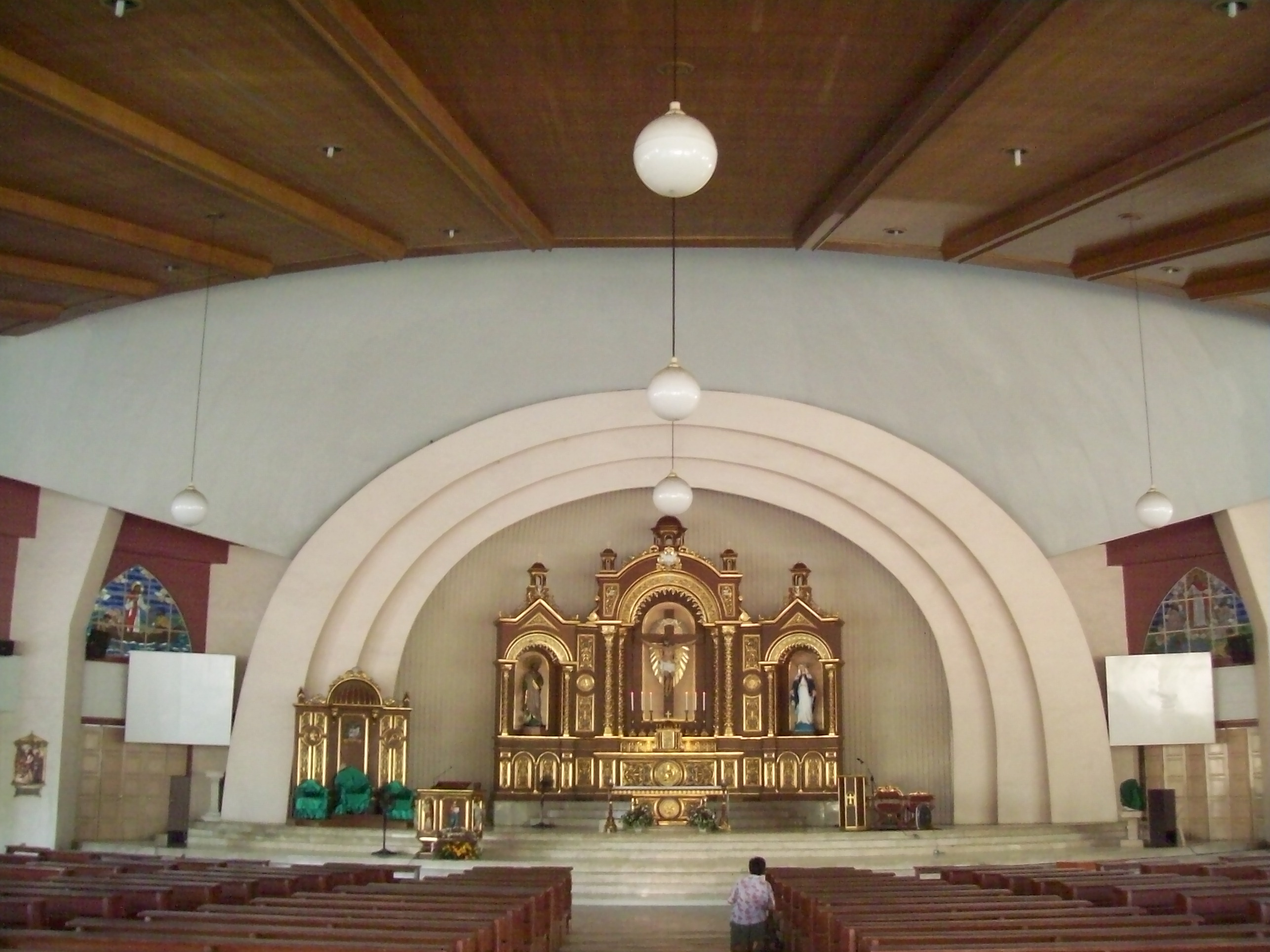
Cathedral sanctuary

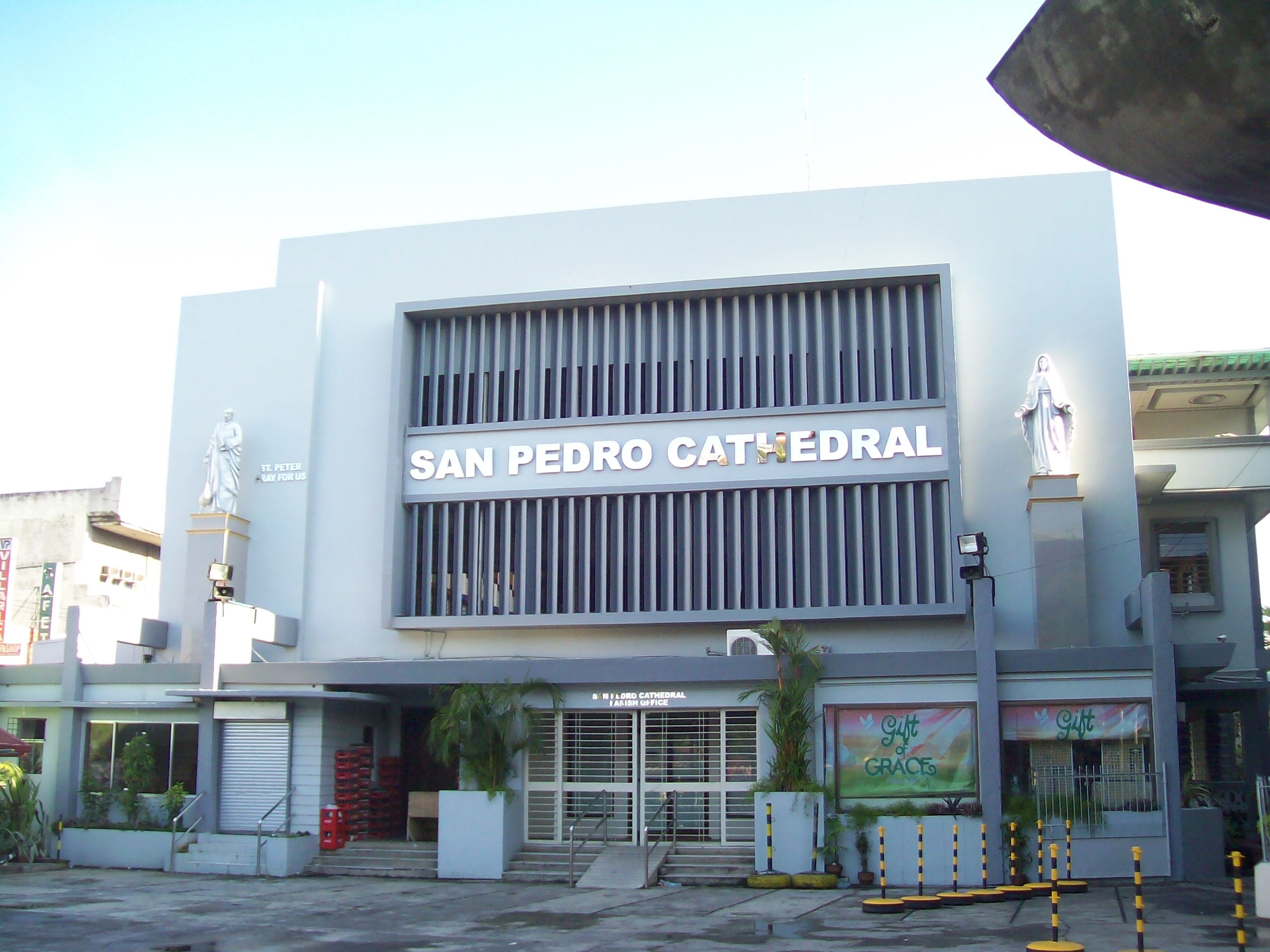
Parish office
