= Archdiocese of Davao =

Roman Catholic archdiocese in the Philippines

Coordinates: 7.0646°N 125.6090°E

Metropolitan Archdiocese of Davao Arcihdioecesis Metropolitae Davaënsis Arsidyosesis Metropolitano sa Davao Kalakhang Arkidiyosesis ng Dabaw Arquidiócesis Metropolitano de Davao

Catholic
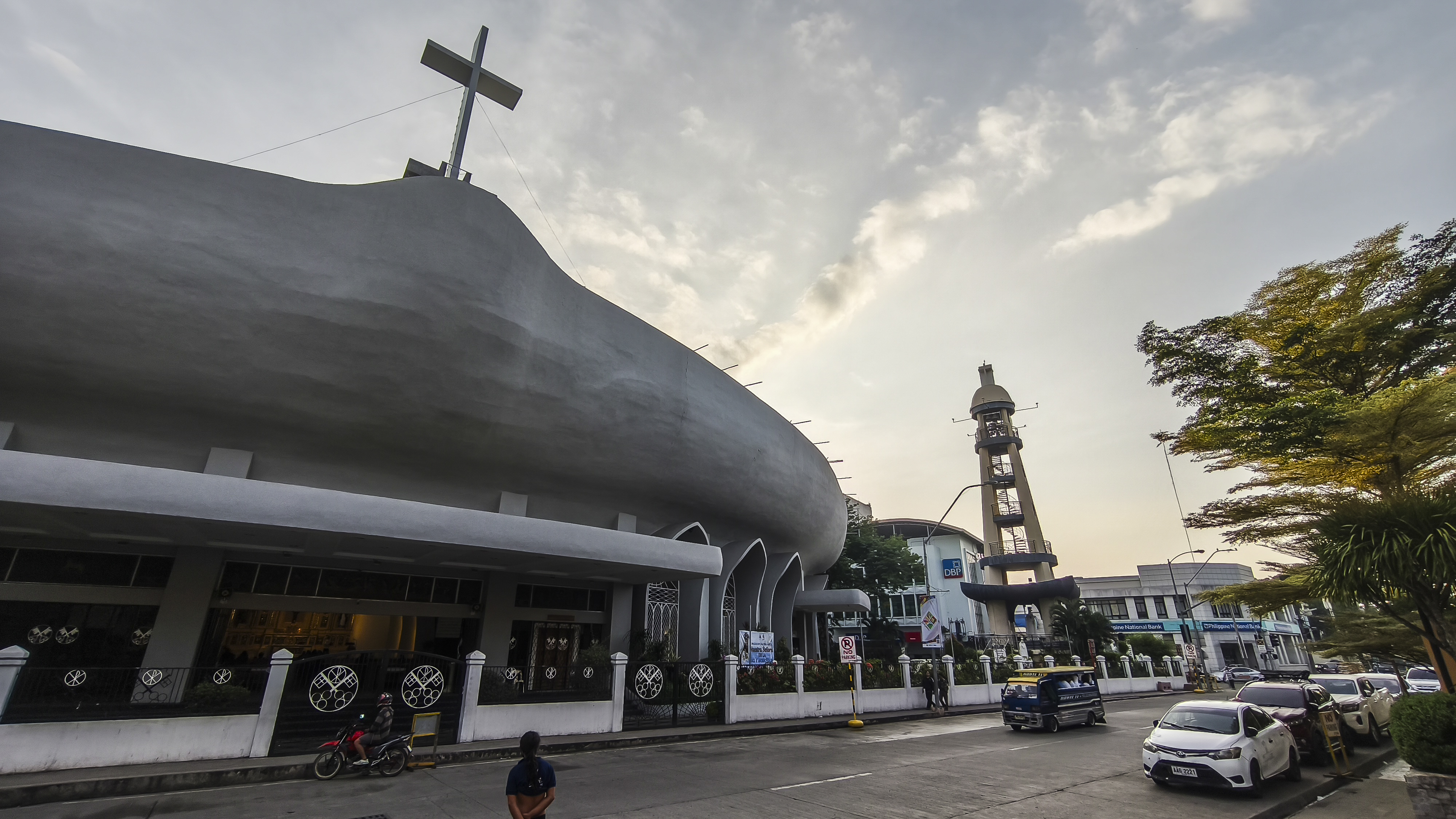
- Davao Cathedral, August 2026

- Coat of arms

Location
- Country: Philippines
- Territory: Davao City, Talaingod, Davao del Norte and the Island Garden City of Samal
- Ecclesiastical province: Davao
- Deaneries: 7

Statistics
- Area: 2,443 km^{2} (943 sq mi)
- Population: Total; Catholics: (as of 2021); 2,100,285; 1,635,540 (77.9%)
- Parishes: 39

Information
- Denomination: Catholic
- Sui iuris church: Latin Church
- Rite: Roman Rite
- Established: December 17, 1949 (Prelature); July 11, 1966 (diocese); June 29, 1970 (archdiocese)
- Cathedral: Cathedral of St. Peter
- Patron saint: Saint Peter
- Secular priests: 77

Current leadership
- Pope: Leo XIV
- Metropolitan Archbishop: Abel Apigo
- Suffragans: Guillermo Dela Vega Afable; Medel Sacay Aseo
- Auxiliary Bishops: George Beluso Rimando
- Bishops emeritus: Romulo Valles

Map
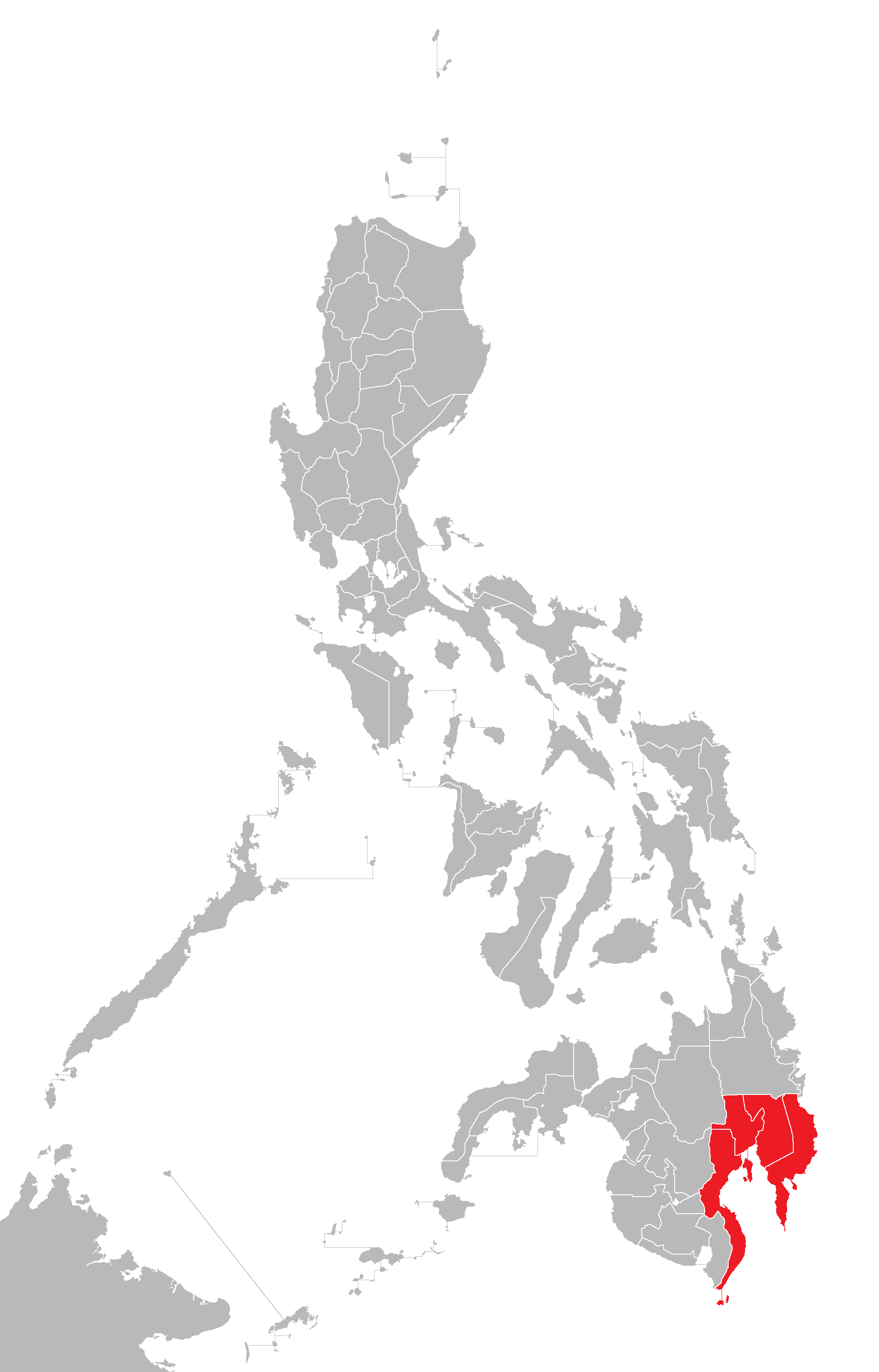
- Jurisdiction of the metropolitan see within the Philippines.

Website
- archdioceseofdavao.com

The Metropolitan Archdiocese of Davao (Latin: Archidioecesis Metropolitan Davaënsis) is an ecclesiastical jurisdiction of the Catholic Church in the Philippines. It is a metropolitan see in southern Mindanao. The archdiocese comprises the city of Davao, and the Island Garden City of Samal in Davao del Norte.

Under its jurisdiction are the three suffragan dioceses of Digos, Tagum, and Mati.

== History ==
Former Coat of arms of then-diocese of Davao (as illustrated in Philippine Studies)

The beginnings of the Archdiocese started with the arrival of the Augustinian Recollects in 1848 followed by the Jesuits soon after.

Its official beginnings came during its establishment as a Prelature Nullius on December 17, 1949, having the Archdiocese of Cebu as its Metropolitan. It was elevated into a diocese on July 11, 1966, and eventually became an archdiocese on June 29, 1970, taking as its titular patron saint Peter the Apostle whose feast day is celebrated also on June 29.

The official name given to the ecclesiastical jurisdiction is "Archidioecesis Davaensis" and San Pedro Cathedral Parish as the seat of the archbishop.

On December 29, 1954, Clovis Thibault was appointed prelate of the prelature of Davao. He was a priest of the Foreign Mission Society of Quebec. He became the first bishop and archbishop when the prelature was elevated into a diocese and later into an archdiocese. Antonio Lloren Mabutas, a native of Agoo, La Union, succeeded him on December 9, 1972. He was then succeeded by Fernando Capalla who first became Coadjutor Archbishop on June 28, 1994, and became its archbishop on November 6, 1996. The current archbishop of Davao is Romulo Valles, who was appointed in 2012.

== Ordinaries ==
=== Metropolitan Archbishops ===
No	Name	In office	Coat of arms
1.	Clovis Joseph Thibauld	1954–1966 (as Prelate); 1966–1970 (as Bishop); 1970–1972 (as Archbishop)	
2.	Antonio Lloren Mabutas	1972–1996	
3.	Fernando Capalla	1996–2012	
4.	Romulo Geolina Valles	2012–2026	
5.	Abel Cahiles Apigo	2026–present	

=== Auxiliary bishops ===
- Fernando Capalla (1975–1977)
- Pedro Rosales Dean (1977–1980)
- Generoso Cambronero Camiña (1978–1979)
- Patricio Hacbang Alo (1981–1984)
- Juan de Dios Mataflorida Pueblos (1985–1987)
- Alfredo Banluta Baquial (1988–1993)
- Guillermo Dela Vega Afable (2001–2002)
- George Beluso Rimando (2006–present)

== Suffragan dioceses ==
Diocese	Bishop	Period in office	Coat of arms
Digos (Davao del Sur and Davao Occidental)	Guillermo Dela Vega Afable	February 11, 2003 – present (23 years, 271 days)	
Mati (Davao Oriental)	Sede vacante	Since November 9, 2026 (0 days)	
Tagum (Davao del Norte)	Medel Sacay Aseo	June 20, 2018 – present (8 years, 142 days)	

== Statistics ==
As of 2023:

- Total Population – 1,829,041
- Catholic Population – 1,506,873
- Diocesan Priests – 82
- Religious Priests – 51
- Male Religious – 119
- Female Religious – 530
- Parishes – 41
- Vicariates – 7
- Catholic educational institutions – 3 seminaries, 2 universities, 6 colleges, and 14 high schools

== See also ==
- Catholic Church in the Philippines
