= Catholic Bishops' Conference of the Philippines =

Assembly of Catholic bishops

- Logo

- Chancery
- Abbreviation: CBCP
- Formation: February 15, 1945; 81 years ago
- Type: Episcopal conference
- Headquarters: 470 General Luna Street
- Location: Intramuros, Manila 1002
- Coordinates: 14.5894893°N 120.9724191°E
- Region served: Philippines
- Members: 90 active; 40 honorary (2022)
- Official language: Latin; English and Filipino (lingua franca)
- Secretary General: Bernardo Pantin
- President: Gilbert Garcera
- Vice President: Julius Tonel
- Treasurer: John F. Du
- Subsidiaries: Catholic Media Network
- Website: cbcponline.net; cbcpnews.net

The Catholic Bishops' Conference of the Philippines (Note: In Philippine languages: Filipino: Kapulungan ng mga Katólikong Obispo ng Pilipinas; Cebuano: Hugpong sa mga Obispo nga Katoliko sa Pilipinas; Central Bikol: Komperensya kan mga Obispo Katoliko kan Filipinas; Hiligaynon: Komperensya sang mga Obispo Katoliko sang Pilipinas; Ilocano: Kumperensya ti Obispo nga Katoliko ti Filipinas) (abbreviated as CBCP) is the permanent organizational assembly of the Catholic bishops of the Philippines exercising together certain pastoral offices for the Christian faithful of their territory through apostolic plans, programs and projects suited to the circumstances of time and place in accordance with law for the promotion of the greater good offered by the Catholic Church to all people.

Standing as the national episcopal conference in the Philippines, it consists of all diocesan bishops and those equivalent to bishops in church law; all coadjutor and auxiliary bishops; and all other titular bishops who exercise for the entire nation a special office assigned to them by the Holy See. It has 90 active and 40 honorary bishops and other members. The chancery is centrally located within the Intramuros district, located just behind the Manila Cathedral.

Archbishop Gilbert Garcera of the Archdiocese of Lipa currently serves as its president since December 2025.

== Purpose ==
As provided in its constitution, the purposes of this episcopal conference is to promote solidarity in the Philippine Church; to engage the Philippine Church actively in the thrusts of the universal church; to assume the responsibilities as evangelizer in relation to all the people, and in particular to civil authority; and to foster relations with other Episcopal Conferences.

According to this document, the purpose of the conference is to promote solidarity in the Philippine Church, formulate joint pastoral policies and programs, engage the Philippine Church as abide in the pastoral thrusts of the universal church, assume the responsibilities as evangelizer in relation to all the people and with the civil authority in particular and to foster relations with other Episcopal Conferences.

== Plenary Assembly ==
The Plenary Assembly is the highest decision-making body of the Conference, consisting of all bishops gathered. It meets in regular session twice a year – in January and in July. When the Plenary Assembly is not in session, the Permanent Council is authorized to act for and in behalf of the Conference.

It is the Plenary Assembly which elects through direct vote the executive officers of the Conference. These include the following: President, Vice-President, Secretary General and Treasurer. It is likewise the Plenary Assembly which elects the members of the Permanent Council, the chairpersons of the Episcopal Commissions, and the heads of the agencies attached to the Conference.

The President of the CBCP serves for a term of two years, and is limited to only two consecutive terms. The members of the Permanent Council, on the other hand, have a term of two years but are allowed a cumulative number of up to four terms. They may not, however, serve for more than two consecutive terms in succession.

== Permanent Council ==
The Permanent Council is composed of the executive officers and ten elected members representing the Luzon (5), Visayas (3) and Mindanao (2) regions.

The Council acts in accordance with the Constitution and By-Laws of the CBCP, and the policies and standing decisions of the Plenary Assembly.

The Council may be convened by the President at any time for the discharge of its regular functions or for special purposes. However, when the Council cannot have a quorum, the members present, together with other CBCP members available, may also act for and in behalf of the Conference.

The Permanent Council's regular functions include ensuring that the decisions made during the Plenary Assembly are properly executed and directing the activities of the Office and other agencies of the Conference. It is also tasked to prepare the agenda for the meetings of the Plenary Assembly and examine and approve the Conference's annual budget, prior to submission and final approval of the Plenary Assembly.

A crucial function of the Permanent Council is to prepare the Joint Statements or Pastoral Letters of the Hierarchy on subject matters decided on by the Plenary Assembly, and see to it that copies are sent to the members for comment and/or approval before they are officially released.

The council is likewise mandated to work with the Episcopal Commissions and assign to them functions of urgent character which may not have been taken up in the Plenary Assembly and which may not be provided for in the Constitution. It also has the power to set up temporary agencies for some particular inquiry or for some limited sphere of actions.

== Composition ==
As of 2022, the episcopal conference has 90 active member cardinals, archbishops and bishops as well as 40 honorary members.

The Philippines has 16 archdioceses, 51 dioceses, 7 apostolic vicariates, 5 territorial prelatures and a military ordinariate.

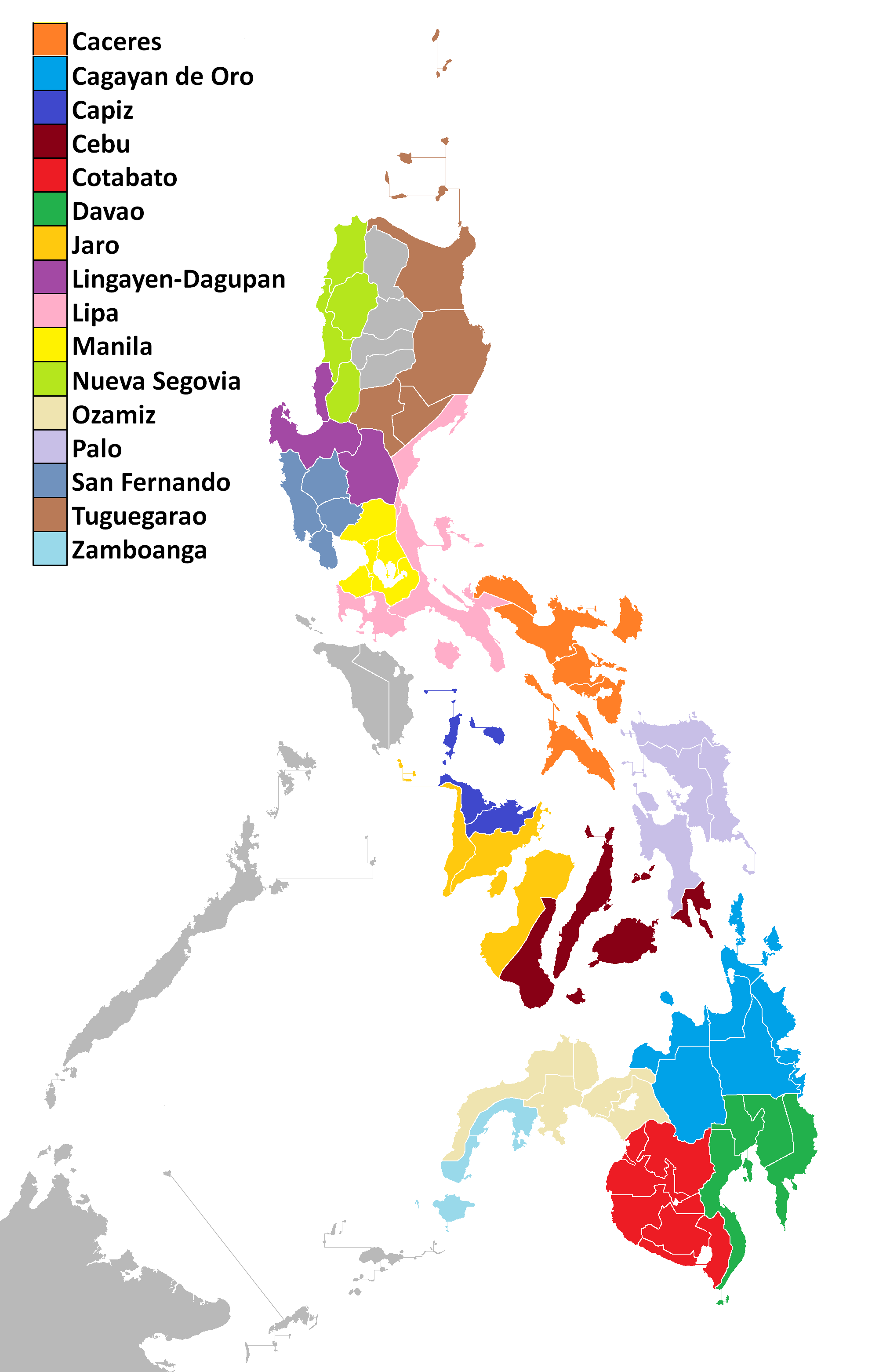
Map of the Philippines showing the different ecclesiastical provinces

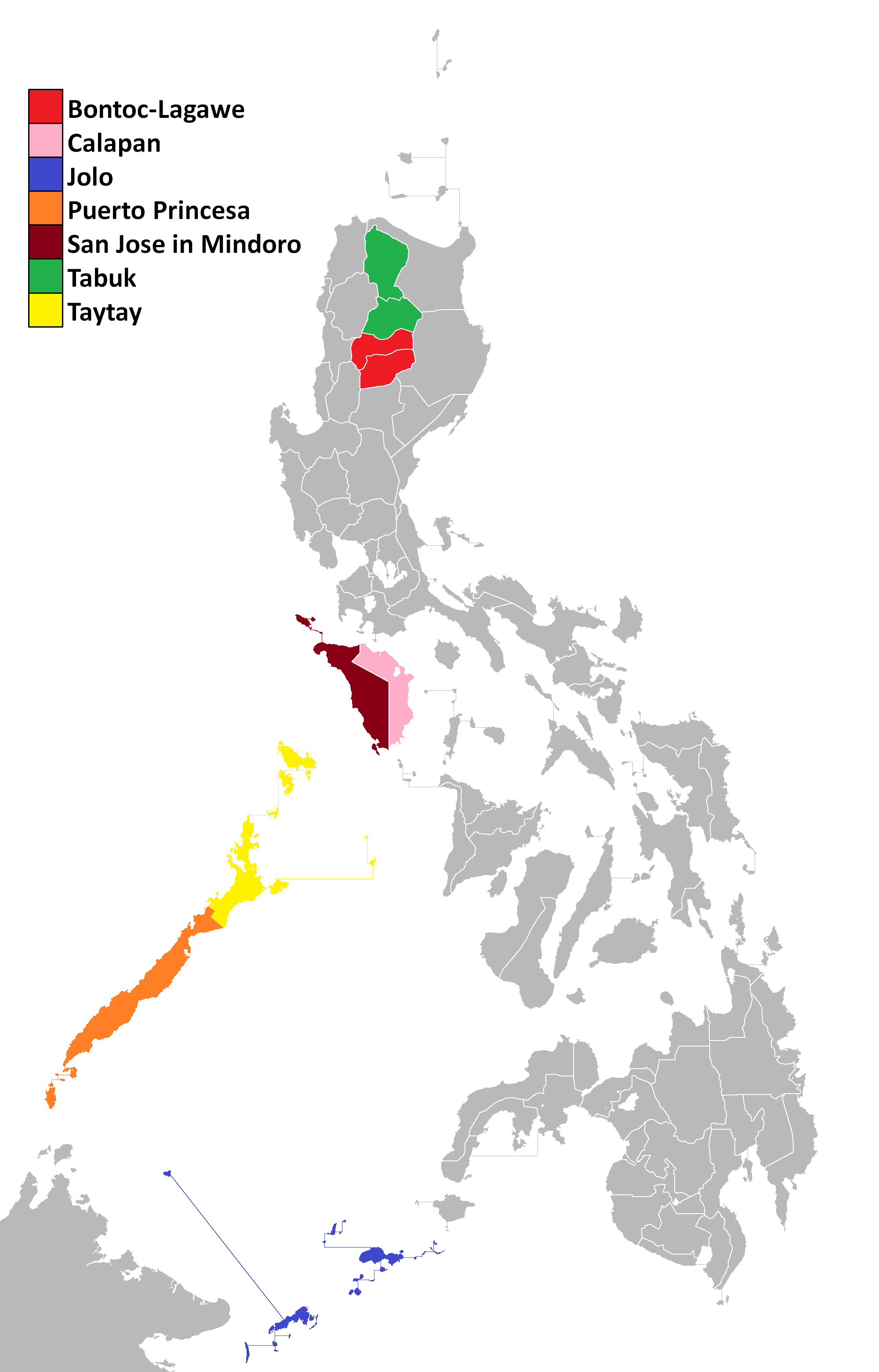
Map of the Philippines showing the different apostolic vicariates

== Philippine politics ==
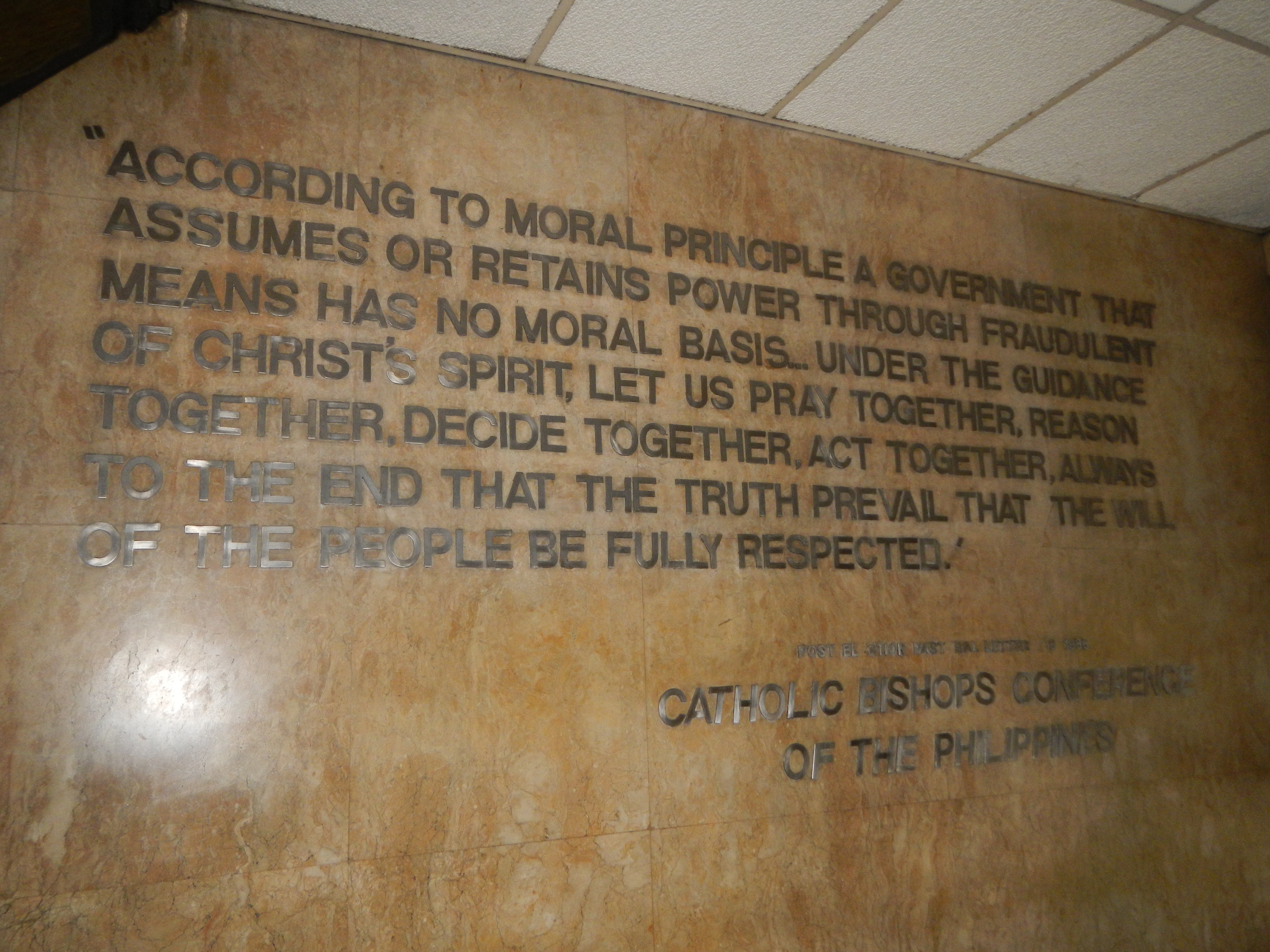
Post-election pastoral letter by the CBCP in 1986

The episcopal conference expressed dismay (July 6, 2007) over the conduct of the May 14, 2007, midterm elections, saying "the challenge of credible, honest, meaningful and peaceful polls remains". CBCP president Lagdameo lamented that "vote-buying and other anomalies have already become systematic and even cultural." He stressed that election watchdogs, including the Parish Pastoral Council for Responsible Voting (PPCRV), noted that the problem no longer lies in the voters but the voting system itself and the irresponsibility of some election officials. PPCRV chairman Henrietta de Villa told the bishops that last May's elections merely repeated the unresolved poll fraud issues in the 2004 race between Arroyo and the late Fernando Poe Jr. Lagdameo promised that they would come up with a full assessment of the conduct of the May 14 midterm elections at the conclusion of the assembly (July 9). The CBCP is also expected to discuss other pertinent issues, including extrajudicial killings of activists and journalists as well as the implementation of the new Anti-Terror Law.

Lagdameo asked the government to review the controversial anti-terror law, fearing it could be abused. The CBCP warned that the Human Security Act may be used by authorities to quell popular dissent against the government of Mrs. Arroyo. The CBCP, in a press conference, further called for a change of leadership at the Commission on Elections as it noted the "continuing dominance" of political dynasties, dagdag-bawas, and poll violence. Demanding "full revamp of the Comelec", it sought for the appointment of people with "unquestioned integrity and competence, especially in systems and management" to succeed Chair Abalos and the five other members. There should also be "serious efforts to de-politicize and professionalize the bureaucracy," the CBCP said in a two-page pastoral statement read by its president Angel Lagdameo. Its call came after the vote of the 85-bishop CBCP during their two-day plenary assembly. Meanwhile, Comelec Commissioner Rene Sarmiento urged the early nomination process (which must be transparent and should involve the electorate) for the four poll commissioners. The terms of office of Chair Abalos and Commissioners Tuason and Borra would end in February next year, with an existing vacancy at the Comelec.

On December 17, 2007, in a statement on the Catholic Bishops Conference of the Philippines (CBCP) website, Pampanga archbishop Paciano Aniceto stated that Pope Benedict XVI assured Filipinos that God and the church are still with them – in his encyclical "Spe Salvi facti sumus (In hope we are saved)." Also, Manila auxiliary bishop Broderick Pabillo was appointed the new chair of the Episcopal Commission on Social Action and Peace and the National Action for Social Justice and Peace (Nassa), the CBCP's social arm, replacing Marbel bishop Dinualdo Gutierrez.

On January 7, 2008, Bishop Leonardo Medroso, chairman of the CBCP Episcopal Commission on Canon Law and bishop of Tagbilaran diocese, Bohol, issued the appeal to priests to stay away from politics, ahead of the May 2010 elections. He cited Code of Canon Law, prohibition, Canon 287, which forbids all clerics from entering politics and that priests "cannot have an active role in political parties unless the need to protect the rights of the church or to promote the common good." Three priests—Crisanto de la Cruz, Ronilo Maat Omanio and Ed Panlilio—who ran in the last elections were suspended from their pastoral duties as a result of their entry into the political arena. Only Panlilio won.

On January 19, 2008, the Catholic Bishops Conference of the Philippines (quoting from a letter of Vatican Cardinal Secretary of State Tarcisio Bertone) announced that Pope Benedict XVI "praised the courage of, and was saddened over the brutal and tragic killing of Reynaldo Roda in his ministry as head of Notre Dame School." The Pope wrote Jolo Bishop Angelito Lampon: "calls upon the perpetrators to renounce the ways of violence and to play their part in building a just and peaceful society, where all can live together in harmony."

Church insiders reported that the CBCP was still ruled by conservatives, amid renewed calls for Mrs. Arroyo's resignation. Bishops therefore, failed to join these clamors, since the President "continues to wield influence over a good number of CBCP members".

== Positions ==
=== HIV/AIDS ===
In 2015, the head of CBCP's Episcopal Commission on Health Care, Dan Vicente Cancino, explained that the rise of HIV/AIDS cases in the Philippines due to Filipinos believing to "distorted concept of sexuality" due to lack of "family values formation". He urged Filipinos to adhere to traditional Filipino values and live a life of prayer.

The rise of HIV/AIDS cases in the Philippines, as much as ten people per day, has been attributed to the CBCP's stance against reproductive health education and condom use.

=== Philippine Anti-discrimination Bill ===
In December 2011, the CBCP reportedly urged the Philippine Senate not to pass the Bill 2814 known as "Anti-Ethnic, Racial or Religious Discrimination and Profiling Act of 2011" or "Anti-discrimination Bill". CBCP legal counsel Roland Reyes stated that he believes that the bill is a precursor for the passage of a same-sex marriage bill in the country. Another CBCP legal counsel, Jo Imbong, questioned protecting homosexuals because she considers homosexuality to be a choice of the individual. The CBCP sees the Anti-discrimination Bill as a challenge to religious freedom, but the CBCP stated that it supports the bill as long as it rejects second-class treatment for the LGBT community.

== Controversies ==
=== PCSO controversy ===
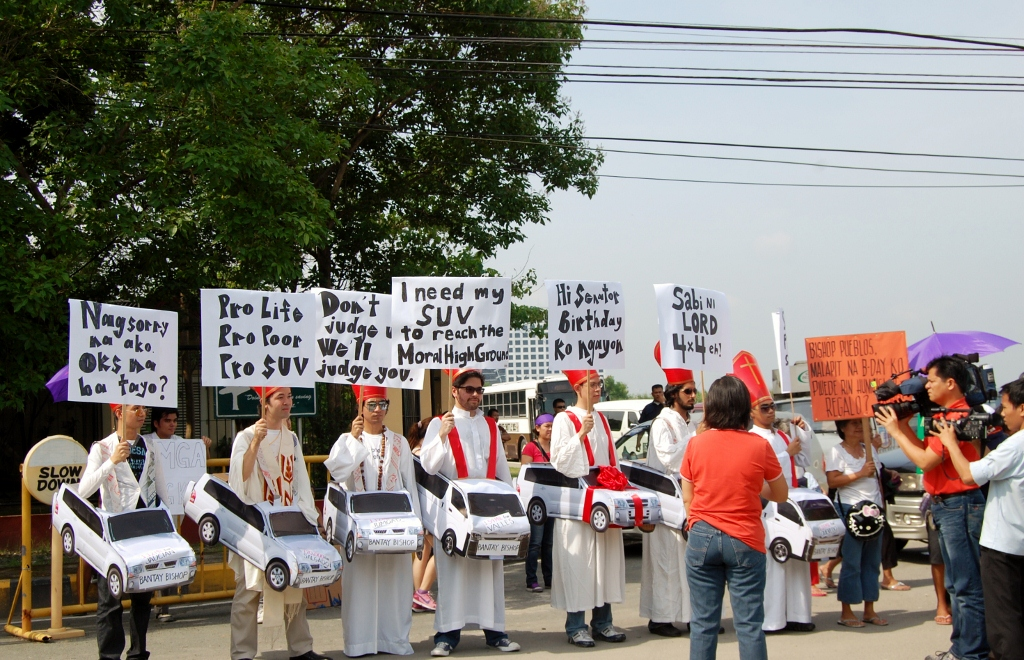
Protesters rallied in front of the Senate against the bishops that allegedly accepted money and luxury cars from former President Gloria Macapagal Arroyo in exchange for support.

The CBCP was embroiled in a controversy in 2011 over millions of pesos in donations from the Philippine Charity Sweepstakes Office at the behest of then-President Gloria Macapagal Arroyo. According to a 2009 Commission on Audit report, some bishops received donations for the purchase of vehicles from the PCSO.

Critics claim the donations were given to ensure the Church’s support for Arroyo, who was then buffeted by scandals and repeated threats of impeachment. The bishops were tagged as "Pajero bishops" as it was alleged that they received Pajero vehicles.

Cardinal Orlando Quevedo, Archbishop of Cotabato, explained that they asked for donations from the government because they are from "the provinces that have some of the most difficult areas that we have." He added that it is their duty to help the people from those provinces with the use of their resources and that "when we lack resources, we seek the assistance from others."

The bishops were summoned during the Senate Blue Ribbon Committee investigation on the anomalies within the PCSO, with the bishops returning the vehicles donated to them. The CBCP Permanent Council also conducted its own investigation regarding the controversy. Senator Teofisto Guingona, Jr, chairman of the Blue Ribbon Committee, said that since the vehicles were used for secular purposes, the donation is not considered as a violation of the 1987 Constitution, but added that the issue was a "litmus test to the Constitution" since the Constitution prohibits favoring a particular religious organization. Senator Juan Ponce Enrile said that the tag "Pajero bishops" were unfair since the bishops did not receive expensive vehicles and said that the PCSO leadership must be blamed for the controversy.

=== Pedophilia ===
Shay Cullen, founder of the People's Recovery Empowerment Development Assistance Foundation, accused CBCP members of covering up cases of sexual abuse and misconduct.

In year 2002, CBCP apologized for the cases of sexual abuse and misconduct that were committed by its priests. CBCP admitted that around 200 priests have been involved in various cases of sexual misconduct, not limited to pedophilia, for time period of 20 years.

According to one report, cases of pedophilia in the Philippines were settled out of court, with convicted clergymen being transferred to other parishes by their bishops. Several cases of pedophilia have been reported with some pending trial.

== John Mary Vianney Galilee Development and Retreat Center for Priests ==
In 1991, at the Second Plenary Council of the Philippines (PCP II), the CBCP decided to build a national center for the ongoing renewal and rehabilitation of clergy, to operate under the CBCP's Episcopal Commission on Clergy.

The John Mary Vianney Galilee Development and Retreat Center for Priests, a 54-room institution, was inaugurated on August 15, 2007 by Archbishop of Manila Cardinal Gaudencio Rosales. The center is meant to accommodate clergy "exiled" for sexual misconduct including pedophilia and siring children.
