= Glenn Corsiga =

Filipino Catholic prelate (born 1965)

His Excellency, The Most Reverend Glenn Montebon Corsiga D.D.
- Bishop of Ipil
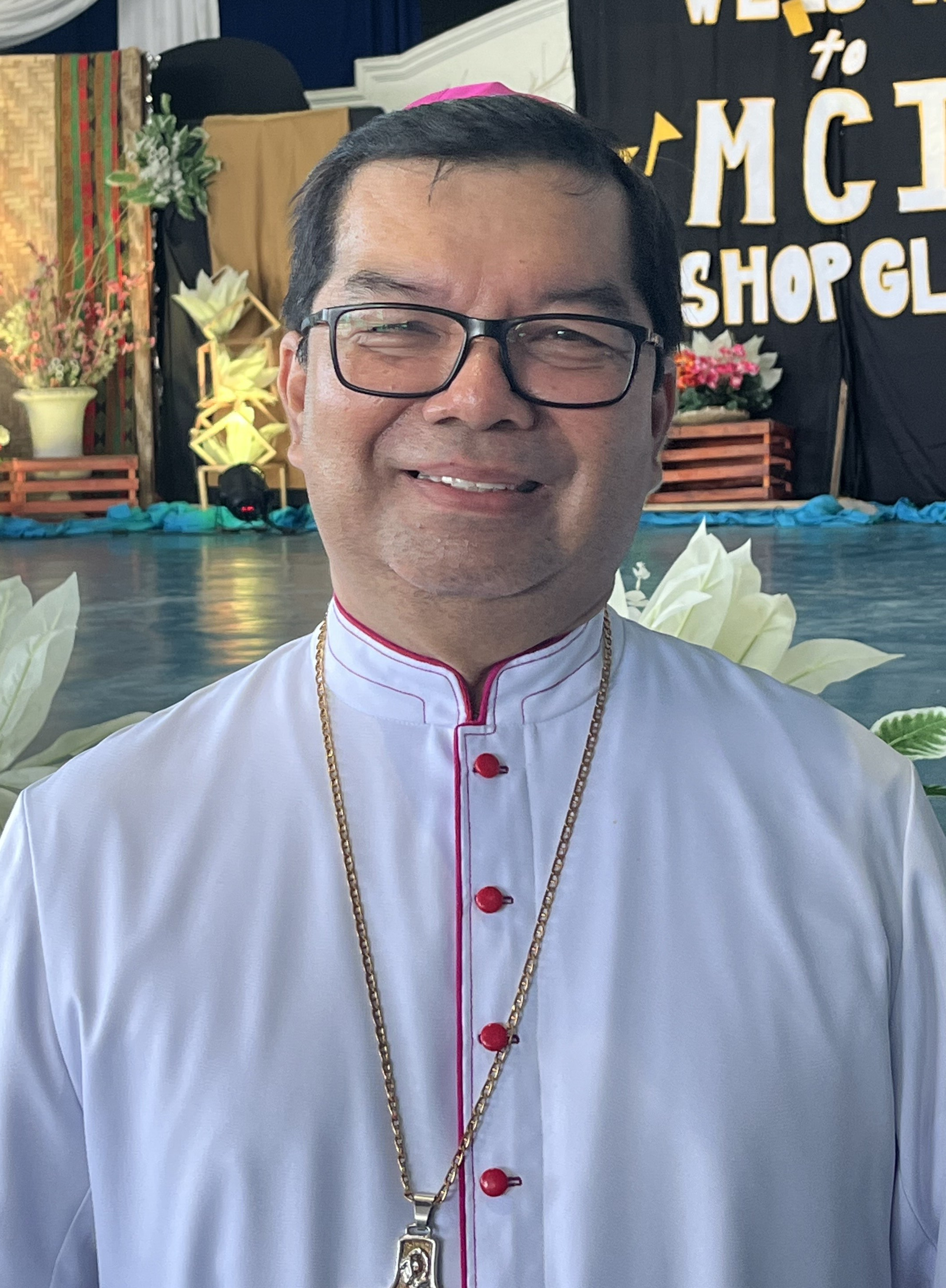
- Corsiga in 2025.
- Church: Catholic Church
- Province: Zamboanga
- See: Ipil
- Appointed: April 14, 2025
- Installed: August 14, 2025
- Predecessor: Julius Tonel
- Previous posts: Priest, Diocese of Dumaguete (1993–2025); Vice Chancellor, Diocese of Dumaguete (2000–2002); Vicar General, Diocese of Dumaguete (2017–2025)

Orders
- Ordination: December 14, 1993 by Angel Lagdameo
- Consecration: July 29, 2025 by Julius Tonel

Personal details
- Born: Glenn Montebon Corsiga; January 21, 1965 (age 61) Dumaguete, Negros Oriental, Philippines
- Education: St. Joseph Seminary College; Divine Word Seminary
- Motto: Amare et Servire (Latin for 'To Love and Serve')
- Coat of arms: Glenn Montebon Corsiga's coat of arms

Ordination history
History
Priestly ordination
- Ordained by: Angel Lagdameo
Episcopal consecration
- Principal consecrator: Julius Tonel
- Co-consecrators: John F. Du; Julito Cortes

Styles of Glenn M. Corsiga
- Reference style: His Excellency; The Most Reverend
- Spoken style: Your Excellency
- Religious style: Bishop

Glenn Montebon Corsiga (born January 21, 1965) is a Filipino Prelate of the Roman Catholic Church. He is the current Bishop of the Diocese of Ipil in Zamboanga Sibugay, having been appointed by Pope Francis in 2025.

== Early life and education ==
Most Rev. Glenn Montebon Corsiga was born on January 21, 1965, in Dumaguete, Negros Oriental, Philippines.

Bishop Glenn studied Bachelor of Business Administration major in Management at St. Paul University Dumaguete and Philosophy at Saint Joseph Seminary College in Sibulan, Negros Oriental, Diocese of Dumaguete, before studying Theology at the Divine Word Seminary in Tagaytay City .

He has published several books of his reflections and homilies including history and spirituality. On that list are: Pulpit Eye, Vox Dei, Table Lamp, Oremus (prayers and spiritual writings); The Floodgate, and ang Kabilin (historical sketch). He also founded the Vox Dei Students’ Assistance Foundation, Inc. (VDSAF) established to help working students finish a degree.

== Ministry ==
=== Priesthood ===
Bishop Glenn Corsiga was ordained a Priest for the Diocese of Dumaguete on December 14, 1993. Following his ordination, he became the Parochial Vicar of Dumaguete City’s Saint Catherine of Alexandria Cathedral Parish until 1994, and Parochial Vicar and Youth Spiritual Director of Santa Clara de Montefalco Parish in Pasay, Metro Manila until 1997.

In 1997, he was appointed Spiritual Director of his alma mater, St. Joseph Seminary College, a position he held until 2002. From 1998 until 2006, he served as Chaplain of St. Paul University Dumaguete, his alma mater. In 2001, he became the Vice-Rector, and eventually, Rector of St. Joseph Seminary College. He held the position of Rector for twelve (12) years: from 2002 to 2014.

Within the Diocese of Dumaguete, he was the Vice Chancellor from 2000 to 2001, and Chancellor from 2001 to 2006, President of the Dumaguete Clergy from 2000 to 2002, Chairman of the Diocesan Commission on Clergy from 2002 to 2006, Episcopal Vicar for the Diocese of Dumaguete North District from 2014-2017, and the Vicar General from 2017 to 2025.

Pope Benedict XVI bestowed the title of Chaplain of His Holiness on Fr Glenn M. Corsiga and nine other Priests of the Diocese in December 2011. In 2014, he was appointed Team Moderator of Saint James the Greater Parish in Tanjay City until 2020, and Parish Priest of St. Augustine of Hippo Parish in Bacong until 2025.

=== Episcopate ===
On April 14, 2025, Pope Francis appointed Msgr. Corsiga as the fourth Bishop of Ipil. He is the last Filipino Bishop to be appointed by Pope Francis before his death last April 21. He succeeds the Most Rev. Julius Tonel, DD, who vacated the Diocese in 2023 upon his appointment as Archbishop of Zamboanga.

Msgr. Corsiga received episcopal consecration on July 29, 2025, at the Dumaguete Cathedral, with Archbishop Julius Tonel (his predecessor as Bishop of Ipil) presiding as the principal consecrator with the Most Rev. John F. Du, DD, Archbishop of Palo, and the Most Rev. Julito B. Cirtes, DD, Bishop of Dumaguete as co-consecrators. He was canonically installed in Ipil on August 14, 2025, by Archbishop Charles John Brown, Apostolic Nuncio to the Philippines.

Catholic Church titles
Preceded by Julius Sullan Tonel	Bishop of Ipil; August 14, 2025 – present	Incumbent
