= Juan López Galván =

Most Reverend Juan López Galván
- Archbishop of Manila
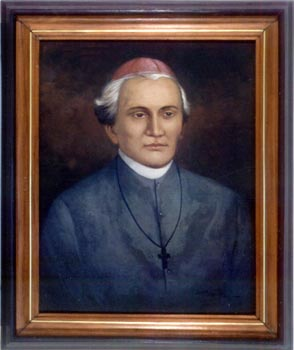
- Church: Catholic Church
- Archdiocese: Archdiocese of Manila
- In office: 1672–1674
- Predecessor: Miguel de Poblete Casasola
- Successor: Felipe Fernandez de Pardo
- Previous post: Bishop of Cebu (1663–1672)

Orders
- Ordination: February 10, 1663
- Consecration: September 9, 1650 by Marcos Ramírez de Prado y Ovando

Personal details
- Born: April 21, 1613 Martín Muñoz de las Posadas, Spain
- Died: February 12, 1674 (age 60)

Juan López Galván, O.P. (April 21, 1613 – February 12, 1674) was a Roman Catholic prelate who served as Archbishop of Manila (1672–1674) and Bishop of Cebu (1663–1672).

== Biography ==
Juan López Galván was born in Martín Muñoz de las Posadas, Spain. On February 10, 1663, he was ordained a priest of the Order of Friars Preachers. On April 23, 1663, Pope Alexander VII appointed him Bishop of Cebu where he succeeded Juan Velez, Bishop Elect of Cebu, who died before his consecration. On January 4, 1665, he was consecrated bishop by Marcos Ramírez de Prado y Ovando, Bishop of Michoacán. On November 14, 1672, Pope Clement X appointed him Archbishop of Manila where he served until his death on February 12, 1674.

== External links and additional sources ==
- Cheney, David M. "Archdiocese of Cebu". Catholic-Hierarchy.org. (for Chronology of Bishops) ^{[self-published]}
- Chow, Gabriel. "Metropolitan Archdiocese of Cebu". GCatholic.org. (for Chronology of Bishops) ^{[self-published]}
- Cheney, David M. "Archdiocese of Manila". Catholic-Hierarchy.org. (for Chronology of Bishops) ^{[self-published]}
- Chow, Gabriel. "Metropolitan Archdiocese of Manila". GCatholic.org. (for Chronology of Bishops) ^{[self-published]}

Religious titles
Preceded by Juan Velez	Bishop of Cebu; 1663–1672	Succeeded by Diego de Aguilar
Preceded by Miguel de Poblete Casasola	Archbishop of Manila; 1672–1674	Succeeded by Felipe Fernandez de Pardo
