= Archdiocese of Zamboanga =

Latin Catholic archdiocese in the Philippines

Coordinates: 6.9089°N 122.0760°E

Archdiocese of Zamboanga Archidiocesis Zamboangensis Arquidiócesis de Zamboanga Arkidiyosesis ng Zamboanga

Catholic
- Metropolitan Cathedral of the Immaculate Conception

- Coat of arms

Location
- Country: Philippines
- Territory: Zamboanga City
- Ecclesiastical province: Zamboanga

Statistics
- Area: 1,638 km^{2} (632 sq mi)
- Population: Total; Catholics: (as of 2021); 1,052,763; 707,170 (67.2%)
- Parishes: 28 (with 1 quasi-parish)
- Schools: 5

Information
- Denomination: Catholic
- Sui iuris church: Latin Church
- Rite: Roman Rite
- Established: April 10, 1910 (as diocese); May 15, 1958 (as archdiocese)
- Cathedral: Metropolitan Cathedral of the Immaculate Conception
- Patron saint: Our Lady of the Pillar
- Secular priests: 57
- Language: English, Chavacano, Cebuano, Ilonggo, Tausug, Tagalog

Current leadership
- Pope: Leo XIV
- Metropolitan Archbishop: Julius Sullan Tonel
- Suffragans: Glenn M. Corsiga (Ipil); Leo M. Dalmao, CMF (Territorial Prelature of Isabela); Charlie M. Inzon, OMI (Jolo)
- Vicar General: Rizalino G. Francisco, Jr.

Map
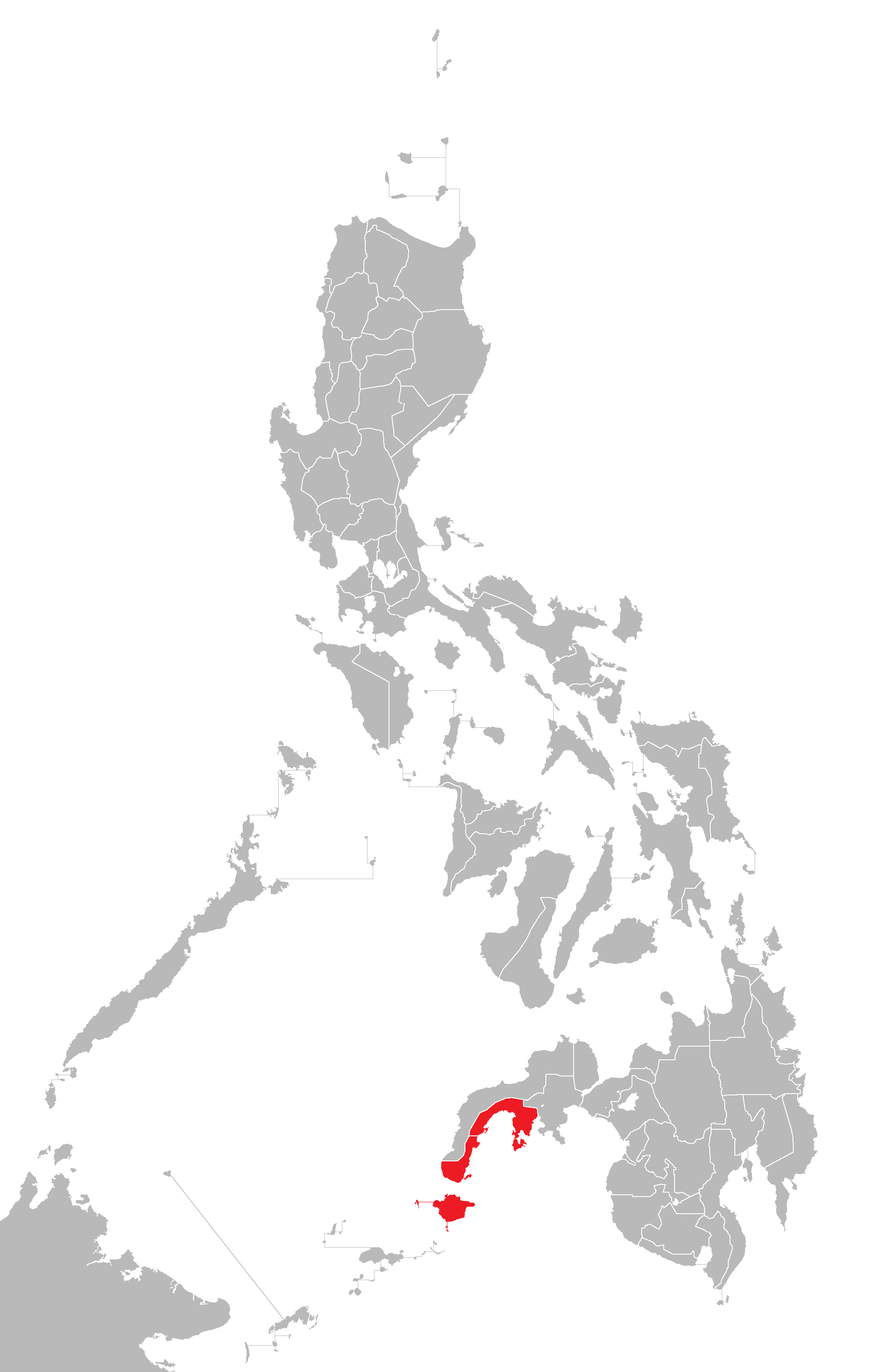
- Jurisdiction of the metropolitan see within the Philippines.

The Archdiocese of Zamboanga (Latin name: Archidiocesis Zamboangensis) is a Catholic archdiocese in the Philippines. Its present jurisdiction includes Zamboanga City, with suffragans in Basilan (Territorial Prelature of Isabela), Zamboanga Sibugay (Diocese of Ipil), and the Apostolic Vicariate of Jolo. It became Mindanao's first diocese in 1910, and was established as the second archdiocese of Mindanao in 1958. It also holds the first parish in all of the Island of Mindanao, St. Ignatius of Loyola Parish in Tetuan and was established in 1863. Today, the archdiocese covers a land area of 1,648 square kilometers and has a population of 442,345, of which 81 percent are Catholics. The archdiocese includes 28 parishes and one quasi-parish, served by 57 diocesan and 18 religious priests. There are also 51 religious sisters working in the archdiocese.

== History ==
From 1607 to 1910, the entire island of Mindanao was under the Diocese of Cebu and Jaro. On April 10, 1910, Pope Pius X created the Diocese of Zamboanga, implementing the provisions laid down by his predecessor, Pope Leo XIII in the latter's 1902 apostolic constitution Quae Mari Sinico. Pope Pius X decreed, through the Sacred Consistorial Congregation, that four episcopal sees in the Philippines be created (Lipa, Calbayog, Tuguegarao, and Zamboanga), with the apostolic prefecture of Palawan, as suffragans to the metropolitan Church of Manila. This diocese would be given jurisdiction over the whole island of Mindanao, including the adjacent islands of the Sulu Archipelago and the island of Cagayan de Sulu.

The Catholic faith was brought to Zamboanga by Jesuit missionaries Melchor de Vera and Alejandro Lopez in 1635. The efforts of the Spanish authorities to subdue the Muslims resulted in reprisal raids in Zamboanga and the Visayan islands. In 1636, Fort Pilar, in honor of Our Lady of the Pillar, was constructed by priest-engineer de Vera. The Jesuit priests Francesco Palliola and Alejandro Lopez died as martyrs in their efforts to win the tribespeople through diplomacy. The establishment of Fort Pilar gave birth to the future city of Zamboanga.

On January 20, 1933, Pope Pius XI divided Mindanao into two areas. Southern Mindanao including the Sulu Archipelago became under the jurisdiction of Zamboanga. Northern Mindanao became under the Diocese of Cagayan de Oro.

On April 28, 1934, Pius XI promulgated an apostolic constitution with the incipit Romanorum Pontificum semper separating the dioceses of Cebu, Calbayog, Jaro, Bacolod, Zamboanga and Cagayan de Oro from the ecclesiastical province of Manila. The same constitution elevated the diocese of Cebu into an archdiocese while placing all the newly separated dioceses under a new ecclesiastical province with Cebu as the new metropolitan see.

In 1951, Cagayan de Oro became an archdiocese, the first in the island of Mindanao. All episcopal jurisdictions in Mindanao and Sulu, including Zamboanga, became suffragans of this archdiocese.

The Diocese of Zamboanga was further divided when the Prelature Nullius of Davao was established and separated in 1949; the Prelature of Cotabato in 1950; the Prelature of Isabela, Basilan, in 1963; and the Prelature of Ipil in 1979.

Zamboanga was established as an archdiocese on May 15, 1958, by Pope Pius XII, with the appointment of Bishop Luis Del Rosario, SJ, as its first Metropolitan Archbishop. As an ecclesiastical province, the Archdiocese of Zamboanga included Zamboanga City and had as suffragans the Prelature of Ipil in Zamboanga Sibugay, the Prelature of Isabela in Basilan and the Apostolic Vicariate of Jolo. Its titular patroness is Our Lady of the Pillar, and its secondary patron is Saint Pius X.

The Second Plenary Council of the Philippines (PCP II) adopted the Community of Disciples as the prime model of the Church, with focus on being a Church of the Poor. The challenge for the archdiocese in Zamboanga is to incarnate the vision of PCP II.

An Archdiocesan Pastoral Assembly was held early in 1995, formalizing preparations for the Second Archdiocesan Pastoral Assembly of Zamboanga in 1996.

Among the Catholic institutions in the Archdiocese of Zamboanga are four colleges, six secondary schools, six elementary schools, and eight kindergarten schools. Charitable and social institutions include a leprosarium, five free clinics, one orphanage and one child center.

In 2010, the Archdiocese of Zamboanga celebrated the 100th anniversary of its establishment as the first diocese in Mindanao with a commemorative celebration of the Holy Eucharist on April 12, 2010, presided by then Archbishop Romulo Valles. The fiftieth or golden anniversary of its establishment as an archdiocese (1958–2008) was part of this celebration.

== Suffragan Diocese Territorial Prelature and Apostolic Vicariate ==
- Diocese of Ipil
- Territorial Prelature of Isabela
- Apostolic Vicariate of Jolo

== Ordinaries ==
Bishops of Zamboanga (April 10, 1910–May 14, 1958)
| Bishop | | Period in Office | Coat of Arms |
|---|---|---|---|
| 1. | Charles Warren Currier | 1910, did not take effect | |
| 2. | Michael James O'Doherty | 1911–1916 | |
| 3. | James Paul McCloskey | 1917–1920 | |
| 4. | José Clos y Pagés | 1920–1931 | |
| 5. | Luis Valdesco Del Rosario, SJ | 1933–1958 | |
Archbishops of Zamboanga (May 15, 1958 – present)
| 1. | Luis Valdesco Del Rosario, SJ | 1958–1966 | |
| 2. | Lino Gonzaga y Rasdesales | 1966–1973 | |
| 3. | Francisco Raval Cruces | 1973–1994 | |
| 4. | Carmelo Dominador Flores Morelos | 1994–2006 | |
| 5. | Romulo Geolina Valles | 2006–2012 | |
| 6. | Romulo Tolentino de la Cruz | 2014–2021 | |
| 7. | Julius Sullan Tonel | 2023– | |

=== Auxiliary bishops ===
- Leopoldo Arayata Arcaira (1961–1966); appointed Auxiliary Bishop of Malolos
- Jesus Yu Varela (1967–1971); appointed Bishop of Sorsogon
- Antonio Realubin Tobias (1982–1983); appointed Bishop of Novaliches
- Moises Magpantay Cuevas (2020–2023); appointed Apostolic Administrator of Zamboanga (2021–2023), appointed Vicar Apostolic of Calapan, Oriental Mindoro

== Feasts proper to the Archdiocese of Zamboanga ==
- August 21 – Memorial of Saint Pius X, pope and secondary patron of the Archdiocese of Zamboanga
- October 12 – Solemnity of the Blessed Virgin Mary, Our Lady of the Pillar (Nuestra Señora Virgen del Pilar), Patroness of the Archdiocese of Zamboanga

== See also ==
- Catholic Church in the Philippines
