= Pedro de Agurto =

Bishop of the Roman Catholic Diocese of Cebu (1544-1608)

Most Reverend Pedro de Agurto
- Bishop of Cebu
- Church: Catholic Church
- Diocese: Diocese of Cebu
- In office: 1595–1608
- Predecessor: None
- Successor: Pedro de Arce

Orders
- Consecration: August 3, 1597 by Diego de Romano y Govea (Vitoria)

Personal details
- Born: 1544 Mexico City
- Died: October 15, 1608 (aged 63–64)

Pedro de Agurto, OSA (1544 – October 15, 1608) was the first bishop of the Roman Catholic Diocese of Cebu (1595–1608).

== Biography ==
Pedro de Agurto was ordained a priest in the Order of Saint Augustine. On August 30, 1595, Pope Clement VIII appointed him Bishop of Cebu. He was consecrated bishop on August 3, 1597, by Diego de Romano y Govea (Vitoria), Bishop of Tlaxcala.

== See also ==
- Catholic Church in the Philippines

Religious titles
Preceded by None	Bishop of Cebu; 1595–1608	Succeeded by Pedro de Arce
