= Dumaguete Cathedral =

Roman Catholic church in Negros Oriental, Philippines

- Saint Catherine of Alexandria Cathedral Parish
- Catedral Parroquial de Santa Catalina de Alejandria (Spanish)
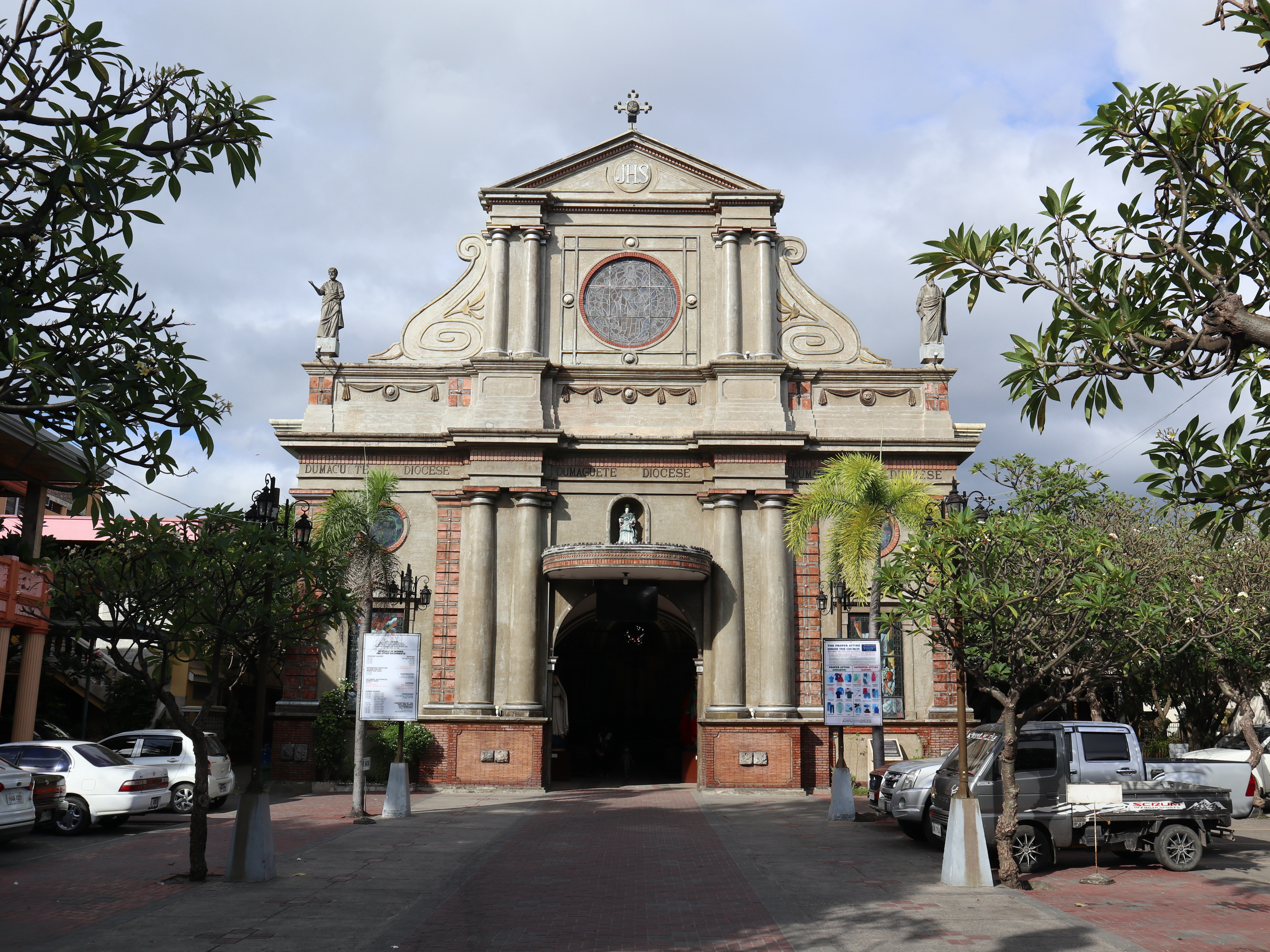
- Cathedral facade in 2023

- Location in the Visayas Location in the Philippines
- 9°18′19″N 123°18′25″E
- Location: Dumaguete, Negros Oriental
- Country: Philippines
- Denomination: Roman Catholic

History
- Status: Cathedral
- Founded: 1620
- Dedication: Catherine of Alexandria
- Consecrated: 1620, 1776

Architecture
- Functional status: Active
- Architectural type: Church building
- Style: Baroque
- Groundbreaking: 1754
- Completed: 1776, 1885
- Demolished: 1846

Administration
- Archdiocese: Cebu
- Diocese: Dumaguete

Clergy
- Bishop: Julito Cortes
- Rector: Robert Bongoyan, HP

Saint Catherine of Alexandria Cathedral Parish, commonly known as Dumaguete Cathedral, is a Roman Catholic cathedral in Dumaguete, Negros Oriental, Philippines. The cathedral is the seat of the Diocese of Dumaguete and is considered as the island's oldest stone church, having been completed in 1776.

== History ==
When the parish of Dumaguete (then a pueblo) was founded in 1620, its jurisdiction covered Negros's southeastern part and the island of Siquijor. Eight secular priests initially served in the parish until 1645, with the first being Fr. Juan de Roa y Herrera. When Fr. Jose Fernandez de Septien served as the Dumaguete's parish priest, the stone church was constructed from 1754 to 1776. Also, it was under Fr. Septien's leadership when the four watchtowers at each corner of the church's lot were constructed which primarily aimed to drive away the Moros ransacking the community from the south.

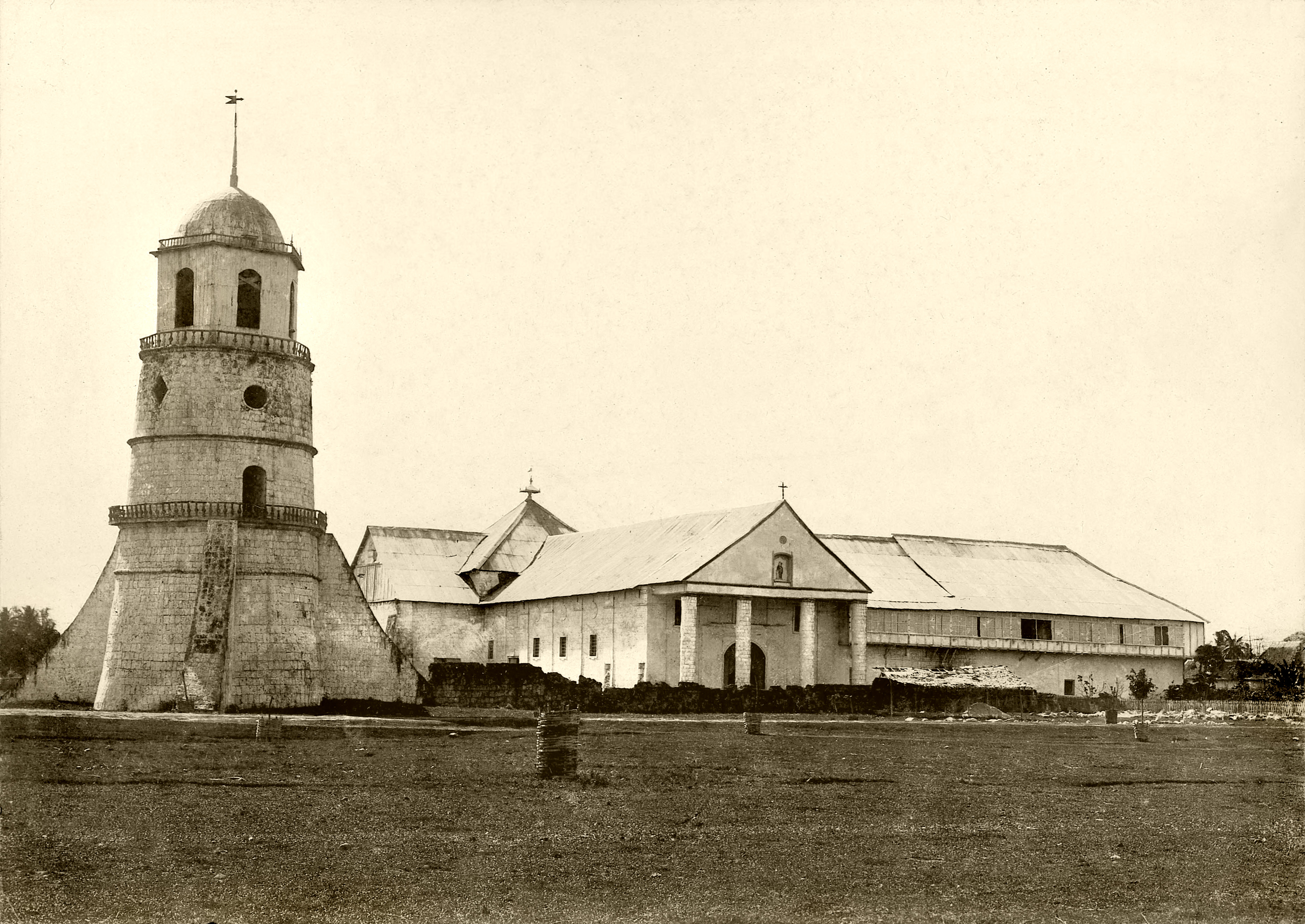
Archival photo of the church of Dumaguete and the watchtower taken in 1901

After Fr. Septien's tenure as a parish priest in 1776, 18 more had served in Dumaguete until the arrival of the first Recollect friar to serve in the town in 1855. Between the said years, additional constructions include the church's transept, and the annex that connected the church itself to the old convent. A firecracker-caused blaze during the November 25 town fiesta of 1846 charred the entire church's wooden ceiling, altars, some of the pews, religious articles and the church organ. The said fire spared the connected convent after the people hurdled to put the fire out immediately. Fr. Antonio Moreno added sacred vestments and articles when he was the parish priest from 1859 to 1866. It was also during Fr. Moreno's time when the church was furnished with galvanized roofing in consonance with the construction of the local children's school made with stone. The full renovation of the church's flooring with fine wood and the addition of a bell tower on one of the watchtowers came under the helm of Fr. Juan Felix de Encarnacion from 1867 to 1879. In 1885, when Fr. Mariano Bernad served as the parish priest, the portico was finished; the following year, two side altars were dedicated to the Virgen de Consolacion and Saint Joseph. The whole church interior was also fully-painted and adorned with embellishments and an organ from Zaragoza was acquired in 1891.

In 1898, the Recollects left when the Philippine Revolution broke out prior to the Philippine-American War, leaving the seculars again in-charge of the parish. The Recollects returned in 1909 and one of the watchtowers was installed again with a belfry. The church of Dumaguete became a cathedral when its eponymous diocese was founded in 1955. At present, the cathedral and the lone surviving watchtower-belfry at its southeastern side, are two of the most known landmarks of Dumaguete and Negros Oriental.

=== Campanario ===
The detached 1879 Campanario, the belfry on one of the watchtowers of the cathedral, had been used to warn against Moro invaders in the 1800 Spanish–Moro conflict. It is one of the oldest heritage landmarks of Dumaguete and Central Visayas. On November 23, 2023, Msgr. Julius Perpetuo Heruela, chair of the Commission on Church Cultural Heritage announced the Important Cultural Property historical marker installation at the Campanario. On May 29, 2024, the National Museum of the Philippines granted ₱9-M funds for the belfry conservation and restoration of cultural property project. The renovation, reinforcement and retrofitting will be a joint undertaking of the NMP, the Diocese of Dumaguete, and the local government.

== Gallery ==
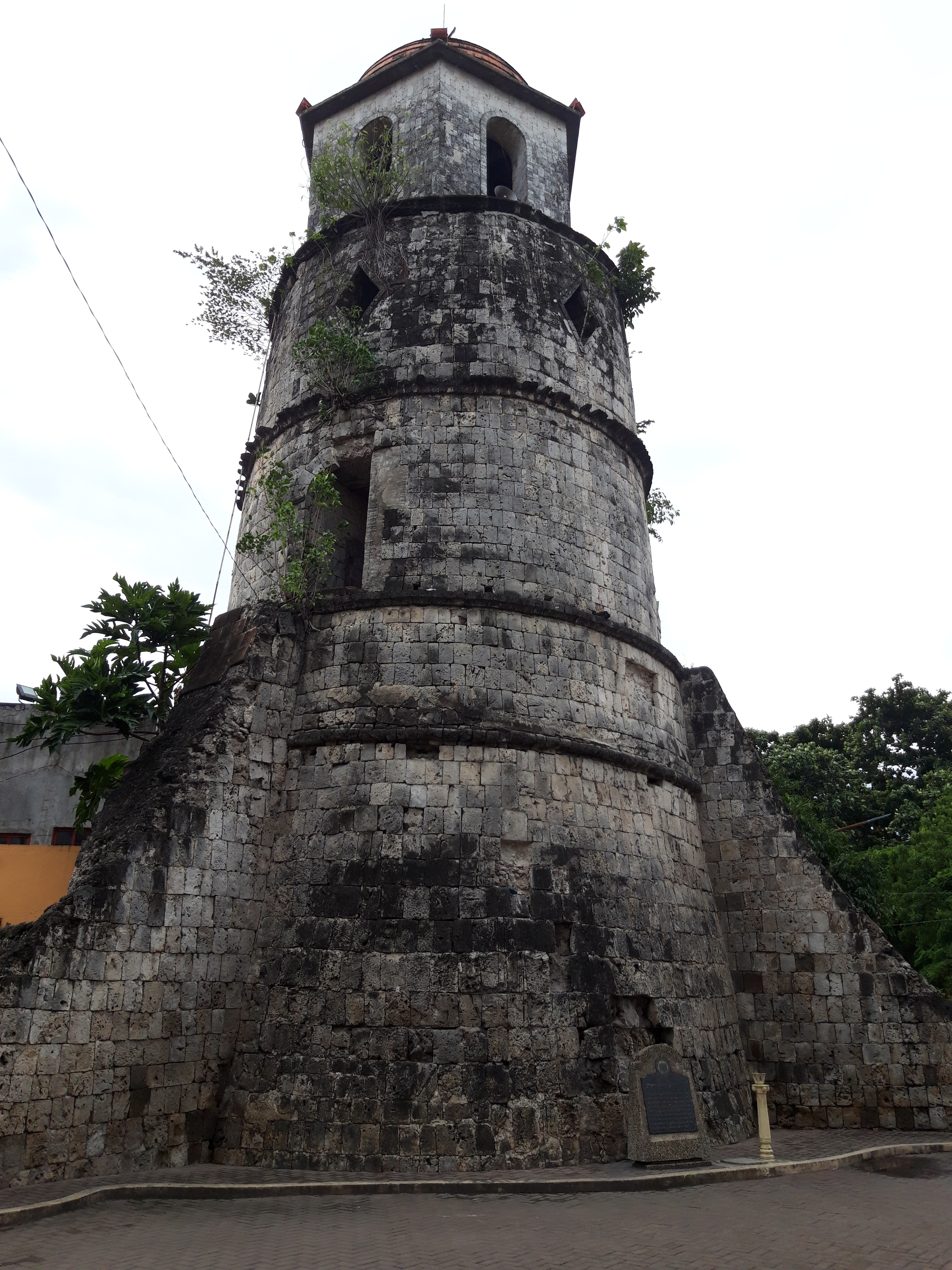
The Dumaguete Watchtower, also known as the Campanario

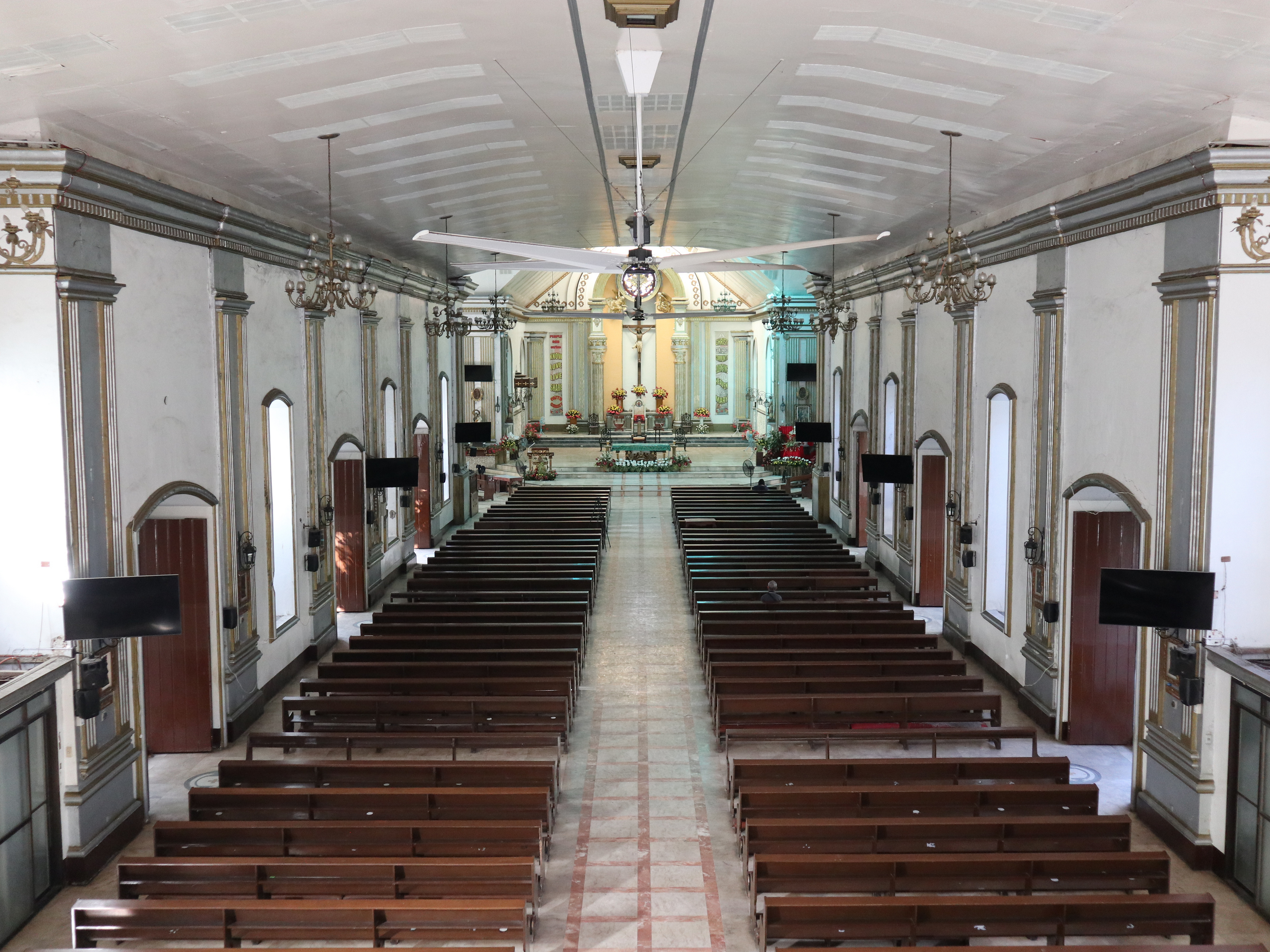
Cathedral interior in 2023

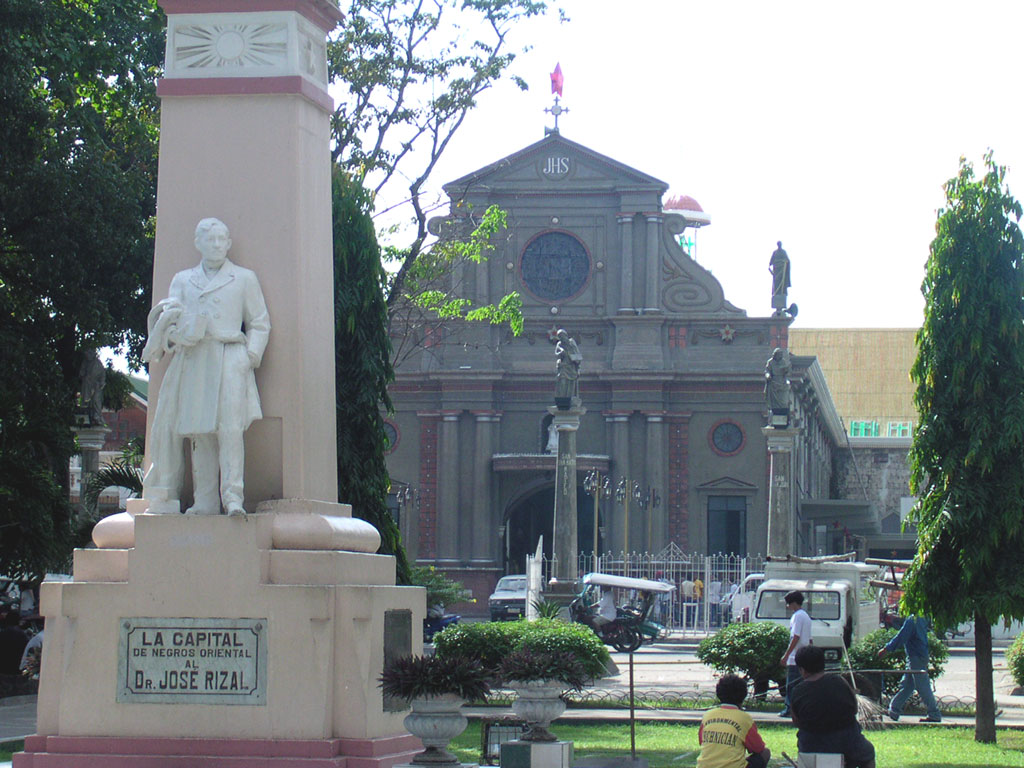
Jose Rizal monument in front of the cathedral

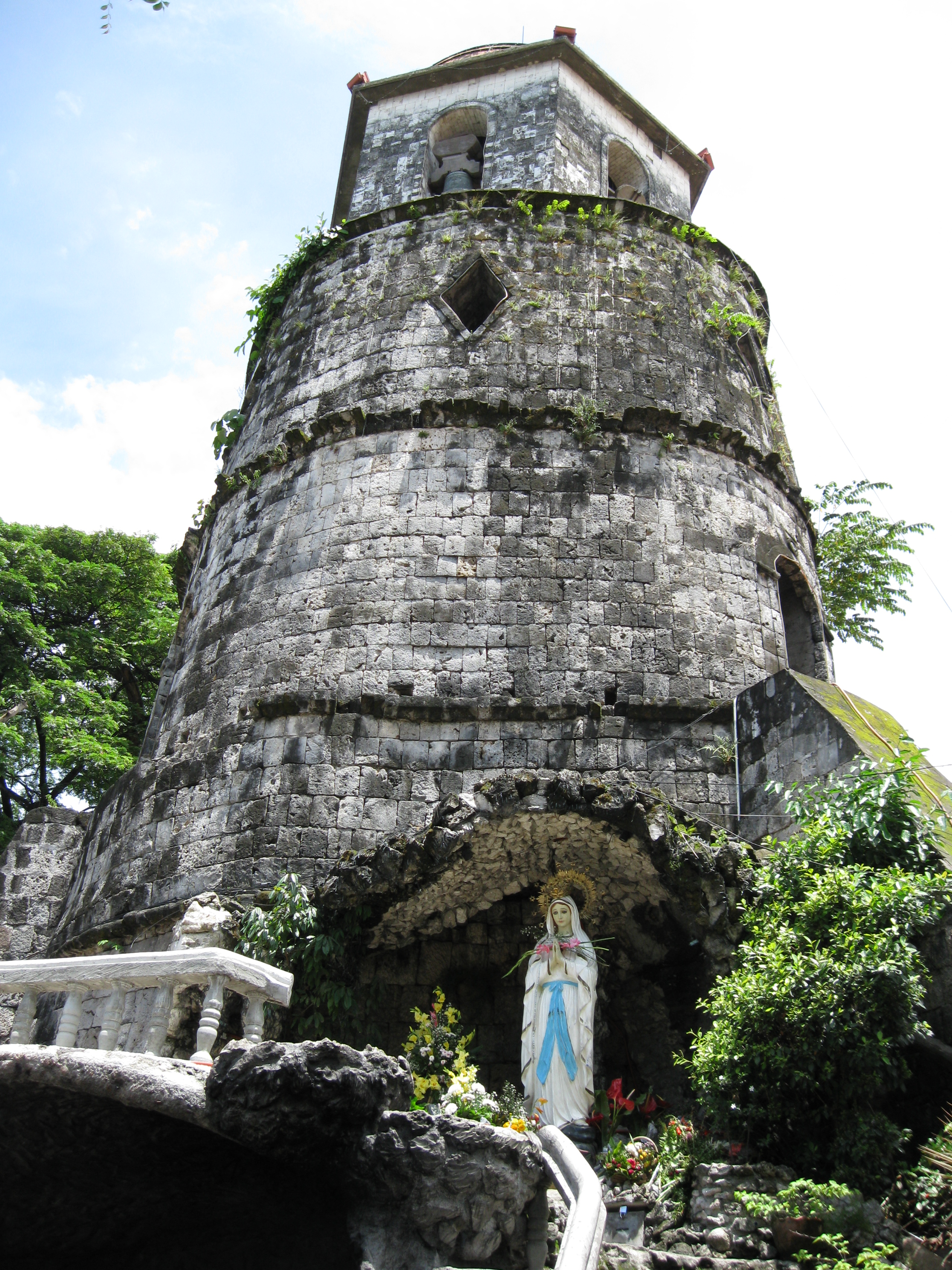
Grotto and praying area at the base of the bell tower
