= Pedro de Arce =

Sankar Induchoodan

Most Reverend Pedro de Arce
- Bishop of Cebu
- Church: Catholic Church
- Diocese: Roman Catholic Archdiocese of Cebu
- Predecessor: Pedro de Agurto
- Successor: Juan Velez

Orders
- Consecration: by Diego Vázquez de Mercado

Personal details
- Born: 1545 Catadiano, Spain
- Died: October 16, 1645 (age 100)

Pedro de Arce, O.S.A. (1545 – October 16, 1645) was the second bishop of the Roman Catholic Diocese of Cebu.

== Biography ==
Pedro de Arce was born in Catadiano Spain and ordained a priest in the Order of Saint Augustine. On June 13, 1604, Pope Paul V appointed him Bishop of Cebu. He was consecrated bishop in 1613 by Diego Vázquez de Mercado, Bishop of the Archdiocese of Manila. He served as Bishop of Cebu until his death on 16 Oct 1645.

While bishop, he was the principal consecrator of Hernando Guerrero, Bishop of Nueva Segovia (1628). In the early 1600s, following the death of Miguel de Benavides, de Arce was embroiled in a seniority issue with Philip III regarding who was to govern the Archdiocese of Manila at that time. This led to a Papal Bull issued by Paul V to settle the matter.

== See also ==
- Catholic Church in the Philippines

== External links and additional sources ==
- Cheney, David M. "Archdiocese of Cebu". Catholic-Hierarchy.org. (for Chronology of Bishops) ^{[self-published]}
- Chow, Gabriel. "Metropolitan Archdiocese of Cebu". GCatholic.org. (for Chronology of Bishops) ^{[self-published]}

Religious titles
Preceded by Pedro de Agurto	Bishop of Cebu; 1604–1645	Succeeded by Juan Velez
