= Juan Velez (bishop elect) =

Roman Catholic clergyman

Most Reverend Father Juan Vélez
- Bishop Elect of Cebu
- Church: Catholic Church
- Diocese: Diocese of Cebu
- In office: 1660
- Predecessor: Pedro de Arce
- Successor: Juan López

Orders
- Ordination: by 1627

Personal details
- Born: 12 March 1602
- Died: 1661 (aged 58–59)

Father Juan Vélez (12 March 1602 – 1661) was a Roman Catholic prelate who was appointed Bishop of Cebu.

== Biography ==
Juan Vélez was born in Córdoba, Spain and ordained a priest in 1627. He served as dean of the church in the Archdiocese of Manila. On 26 January 1660 Pope Alexander VII appointed him Bishop of Cebu. Although he assumed the position as Bishop of Cebu, he died before his consecration as bishop.

== External links and additional sources ==
- Cheney, David M. "Archdiocese of Cebu". Catholic-Hierarchy.org. (for Chronology of Bishops) ^{[self-published]}
- Chow, Gabriel. "Metropolitan Archdiocese of Cebu". GCatholic.org. (for Chronology of Bishops) ^{[self-published]}

Religious titles
Preceded by Pedro de Arce	Bishop Elect of Cebu; 1660	Succeeded by Juan López
