= Julius Tonel =

Filipino Catholic prelate (born 1956)

His Excellency, The Most Reverend Julius S. Tonel D.D.
- Metropolitan Archbishop of Zamboanga
- Church: Roman Catholic Church
- Archdiocese: Zamboanga
- Province: Zamboanga
- Appointed: April 25, 2023
- Installed: August 22, 2023
- Predecessor: Romulo T. de la Cruz
- Other posts: Vice President, CBCP (2025–present)
- Previous post: Bishop of Ipil (2007–2023)

Orders
- Ordination: August 12, 1980 by Pedro Dean
- Consecration: August 20, 2007 by Antonio Mabutas

Personal details
- Born: Julius Sullan Tonel; August 31, 1956 (age 70) Davao, Philippines
- Denomination: Roman Catholic
- Occupation: Archbishop
- Education: Pontifical Institute of St. Anselm
- Motto: In Spiritu Et Veritate (Latin for 'In spirit and truth')
- Coat of arms: Julius S. Tonel's coat of arms

Ordination history
History
Diaconal ordination
- Ordained by: Agnelo Rossi
Priestly ordination
- Ordained by: Pedro Dean
Episcopal consecration
- Principal consecrator: Fernando Capalla
- Co-consecrators: Romulo Valles; Antonio Ledesma
Episcopal succession
Bishops consecrated by Julius Tonel as principal consecrator
- Glenn Corsiga: July 29, 2025
- Styles
- Reference style: His Excellency; The Most Reverend
- Spoken style: Your Excellency
- Religious style: Archbishop,

Julius “Joy” Sullan Tonel (born August 31, 1956) is a Filipino Catholic bishop appointed as the Metropolitan Archbishop of Zamboanga in April 2023. Previously he had served as bishop of Ipil since 2007.

== Biography ==
Julius Tonel was born on August 31, 1956, to Primitivo Estrada Tonel (+) and Filipina Coching Sullan (+), both hailing from the province of Aklan. He is the youngest of six siblings.

In 1972 he graduated in high school at the Saint Francis Xavier Minor Seminary. In 1976 he completed his philosophical studies at the Saint Francis Xavier College Seminary, Davao City; later he would proceed with his theological studies at the University of Santo Tomas Central Seminary in Manila.

On December 7, 1979, Julius Tonel was ordained to the diaconate by Cardinal Agnelo Rossi, then-Prefect of the Sacred Congregation for the Evangelization of Peoples, at Santo Domingo Parish in Quezon City. On April 12, 1980, he was ordained to the priesthood at Santa Ana Church in Davao City by Pedro Dean, Auxiliary Bishop of Davao.

In the initial years of his ministry in Davao City, Father Tonel would be designated as Parochial Vicar of St. Jude Thaddaeus Parish, and of the San Pedro Cathedral. Likewise, he would be appointed as Director of the Archdiocesan Family and Life Apostolate. From 1982 to 1986, he would be assigned as Prefect of Discipline and, later, as Rector of the Saint Francis Xavier College Seminary; he would also be working with the vocations promotion ministry of the Archdiocese.

From 1986 to 1990, Father Tonel would proceed with his postgraduate studies at the Pontifical Institute of Liturgy, Sant'Anselmo, Rome, completing a Licentiate in Sacred Liturgy. From 1990 to 2002, he would be assigned as a formator of the Saint Francis Xavier Regional Major Seminary of Mindanao (Davao City)—subsequently ministering as Spiritual Director, as Vice-Rector and Professor, and eventually as Seminary Rector in 1997. At the same time, Father Tonel would be appointed to several ministries: as Director of the Archdiocesan Liturgical Center in Davao; as President of the Archdiocesan Commission on Basic Ecclesial Communities; and as a consultor at the CBCP Episcopal Commission on Liturgy. In 2002, he was appointed Vicar General for the Archdiocese of Davao. Concurrently as Vicar General, Monsignor Julius Tonel was also the Parish Priest of the Ascension of the Lord Parish in Matina, Davao City, for four years. Likewise, he would be serving as the Chaplain of the Shrine of the Holy Infant of Prague in 2004, and as Parish Priest of San Pablo Parish in Matina in 2006.

=== Bishop of Ipil ===
On June 30, 2007, Pope Benedict XVI appointed Tonel as the third bishop for the Prelature of Ipil. He received episcopal consecration at the San Pedro Cathedral in Davao City on August 20, 2007, with then-Archbishop Fernando Capalla as the principal consecrator, and assisted by then-Zamboanga Archbishop Romulo Valles, and then-Cagayan De Oro Archbishop (and former Bishop of Ipil) Antonio Ledesma, SJ. Tonel took possession of the Prelature on September 11, 2007, at the Saint Joseph the Worker Cathedral in Ipil, Zamboanga Sibugay.

With the elevation of the territorial Prelature of Ipil to the rank of Diocese, Pope Benedict XVI appointed Tonel as the first bishop of the Diocese of Ipil on May 3, 2010. From 2011 to 2016, he would also take office as the Chairman of the Episcopal Commission on Liturgy of the Catholic Bishops’ Conference of the Philippines.

=== Archbishop of Zamboanga ===
On April 25, 2023, Pope Francis appointed Tonel to the Metropolitan Archdiocese of Zamboanga as its seventh archbishop, succeeding the late Archbishop Romulo Dela Cruz, who served the post from May 2014 until his death from illness in December 2021. Ahead of his installation, Tonel received the pallium — the symbol of his authority as metropolitan archbishop — on June 29, 2023, in Rome. He was then installed on August 22, 2023, with Cardinal Jose Advincula, Archbishop of Manila presiding the Mass for his installation. He was also designated to the CBCP Permanent Council as the Regional Representative for South Mindanao on July 8, 2023.

At the 130th plenary assembly of the CBCP in Anda, Bohol on July 5, 2025, Tonel was elected as the vice president of the episcopal conference, succeeding Mylo Hubert Vergara. He assumed his position on December 1.

Catholic Church titles
Preceded by Antonio Ledesma	Prelate of Ipil; September 11, 2007 – May 1, 2010	Succeeded by Himself as Bishop of Ipil
Preceded by Himself as Prelate of Ipil	Bishop of Ipil; August 7, 2010 – April 25, 2023	Succeeded by Glenn Corsiga
Preceded by Romulo Tolentino de la Cruz	Archbishop of Zamboanga; August 22, 2023 – present	Incumbent
Preceded by Mylo Hubert Vergara	CBCP Vice President; December 1, 2025 – present	Incumbent
