= Salvador Trane Modesto =

Salvador Trane Modesto (March 10, 1930 – October 11, 2015) was a Roman Catholic bishop.

Ordained to the priesthood in 1958, Modesto was appointed auxiliary bishop of the Roman Catholic Diocese of Dumaguete, Philippines in 1978. In 1987, he was appointed auxiliary bishop of the Diocese of San Carlos retiring in 2005.
