= Diocese of Ipil =

Latin Catholic diocese in the Philippines

Coordinates: 7.7826°N 122.5840°E

Diocese of Ipil Dioecesis Ipilensis Diócesis de Ipil (Chavacano and Spanish) Diyosesis sa Ipil (Cebuano) Diyosesis ng Ipil (Filipino)

Catholic
- Coat of arms

Location
- Country: Philippines
- Territory: Zamboanga Sibugay; Western Zamboanga del Sur (Bayog, Kumalarang, Lakewood)
- Ecclesiastical province: Zamboanga
- Metropolitan: Zamboanga

Statistics
- Area: 4,297 km^{2} (1,659 sq mi)
- Population: Total; Catholics: (as of 2021); 776,811; 582,608 (75%)

Information
- Denomination: Catholic
- Sui iuris church: Latin Church
- Rite: Roman Rite
- Established: 1979 as a Prelature
- Cathedral: Cathedral of St. Joseph the Worker in Ipil
- Patron saint: Saint Joseph the Worker

Current leadership
- Pope: Leo XIV
- Bishop: The Most Reverend. Glenn Montebon Corsiga D.D.
- Metropolitan Archbishop: Julius S. Tonel

The Diocese of Ipil (Latin: Dioecesis Ipilensis) is a Latin Catholic diocese located in the municipality of Ipil in the ecclesiastical province of Zamboanga. It is an ecclesiastical territory in the province of Zamboanga Sibugay. It occupies an area of 4,850 square kilometers extending from the boundary of Zamboanga del Norte on the north to Olutanga Island on the south, from the town of Tungawan on the west to the town of Margosatubig on the east, boundaries set by Pope John Paul II himself when he decreed the separation of this ecclesiastical territory from the Archdiocese of Zamboanga on December 24, 1979.

The area described above comprises the Province of Zamboanga Sibugay. The terrain is generally hilly, bounded by mountains on the north and the Sibuyan Bay on the south. There are no large cities in the area; it is predominantly rural, predominantly agricultural, with rice, corn, rubber, and coconut as the major crops. Of these, only rubber is produced commercially. The overall economic situation of the area is very poor. Roads and facilities are inadequate.

The population covered by the prelature is 581,316, of which 62 percent are Catholics. A majority of the population are migrants from the Central Visayas area, which accounts for the predominance of the Cebuano dialect, followed by Ilonggo. These are the languages used in the Catholic liturgy.

== History ==
On December 24, 1979, the Territorial Prelature of Ipil was established from the Metropolitan Archdiocese of Zamboanga

The Prelature of Ipil is a suffragan of the Archdiocese of Zamboanga with whom it shares much of its history of evangelization. The faith was first brought to the Zamboanga Peninsula by the Jesuit Missionaries as early as 1635. The Jesuit father took charge for many years over what was then considered mission territory. Two Jesuit priests Father Francisco Paliola and Father Alejandro Lopez lost their lives as martyrs in their efforts to win over the Muslims through diplomacy.

From 1910 the whole Island of Mindanao fell under the jurisdiction of the Diocese of Zamboanga. In 1933, other ecclesiastical territories were established in Mindanao, separating themselves from Zamboanga, the last of which was the Prelature of Ipil in 1979.

Politically the two Zamboangas were just one province since the days of the Spanish era. Because of the many waves of migrations from the northern islands that occurred during the American era, the large province of Zamboanga was split up into two provinces in 1952.

On June 21, 1980, Bishop Federico O. Escaler, SJ, was transferred from Kidapawan to Ipil. At that time there were only 9 parishes with 13 priests, all Jesuits. In 1981 Bishop Escaler invited new groups to come and work in the prelature. And they came: the Spinola Sisters and the PIME Fathers. In 1981 the parish church of Ipil became a cathedral.

The years 1984 and 1985 were peak years of militarization and frequent encounters between the military and the rebels, members of the New People's Army (NPA) and the Moro National Liberation Front (MNLF). These were also the peak years of human rights violations.

In February 1985 the Bishop was kidnapped on his way to Zamboanga City. He was released after a few days, thanks to military-initiated operations. A prelature worker was also shot dead.

On April 4 of 1995, Ipil was again attacked, this time by breakaway elements of the Abu Sayyaf group. The town was set on fire and razed to the ground, and people were butchered to death. Press reports called it a massacre. All that had been so laboriously built went to rubble in a matter of hours.

In spite of these tragedies, the Prelature of Ipil went ahead and celebrated the fifteenth anniversary of its founding in June 1995. It was a celebration of faith and life, as manifested by the prelature's vision statement.

The Prelature's Vision Statement: "We, the people of God of the Prelature of Ipil, believe that God is present among us and has called all the peoples to protect and celebrate life. On the other hand, we feel deeply moved by the suffering that our people have to bear due to economic poverty, political oppression, and cultural disinterest of so many people. We are concerned also over the ecological devastation of our environment. In this regard, we believe that we are called to become a true Church of the poor and a community of disciples of Christ as the Gospel teaches, and the Second Plenary Council of the Philippines affirms."

There are 19 parishes in the prelature, 431 chapels and about 1500 Basic Christian Communities at present. Serving the parishes are 30 priests, 41 religious sisters, and 40 lay workers. Among its institutions are 5 Catholic schools. Among its ministries are those on Christian Formation (KRISKA), Catechetics, Family Life, Tribal Filipinos, Youth, Community-based Health Program and Social Action.

On May 1, 2010, Pope Benedict XVI elevated the Prelature of Ipil to a full diocese, the 58th in the Philippines, and appointed as its first bishop Julius Sullan Tonel, who had served as its Bishop-Prelate.

== Ordinaries ==
=== Territorial Prelature of Ipil ===
No.	Bishop	Period in office	Notes	Coat of arms
Prelates of Ipil (December 24, 1979 – May 1, 2010)
Bishop	Period in Office	Coat of Arms		
1	Federico Ocampo Escaler	February 23, 1980 – June 28, 1997(17 years, 125 days)	Retired	
2	Antonio Javellana Ledesma	June 28, 1997 – March 4, 2006 (8 years, 249 days)	Appointed Archbishop of Cagayan de Oro	
3	Julius Sullan Tonel	September 11, 2007 – May 1, 2010 (2 years, 232 days)	Elevated as Bishop of Ipil	
Bishops of Ipil (May 1, 2010 – present)
1	Julius Sullan Tonel	August 7, 2010 – April 25, 2023 (12 years, 261 days)	Appointed Archbishop of Zamboanga	
2	Glenn Montebon Corsiga	August 14, 2025 – present (26 days)		
