= Vallehermoso, Negros Oriental =

Municipality in Negros Oriental, Philippines

Vallehermoso
- Municipality
- Municipality of Vallehermoso
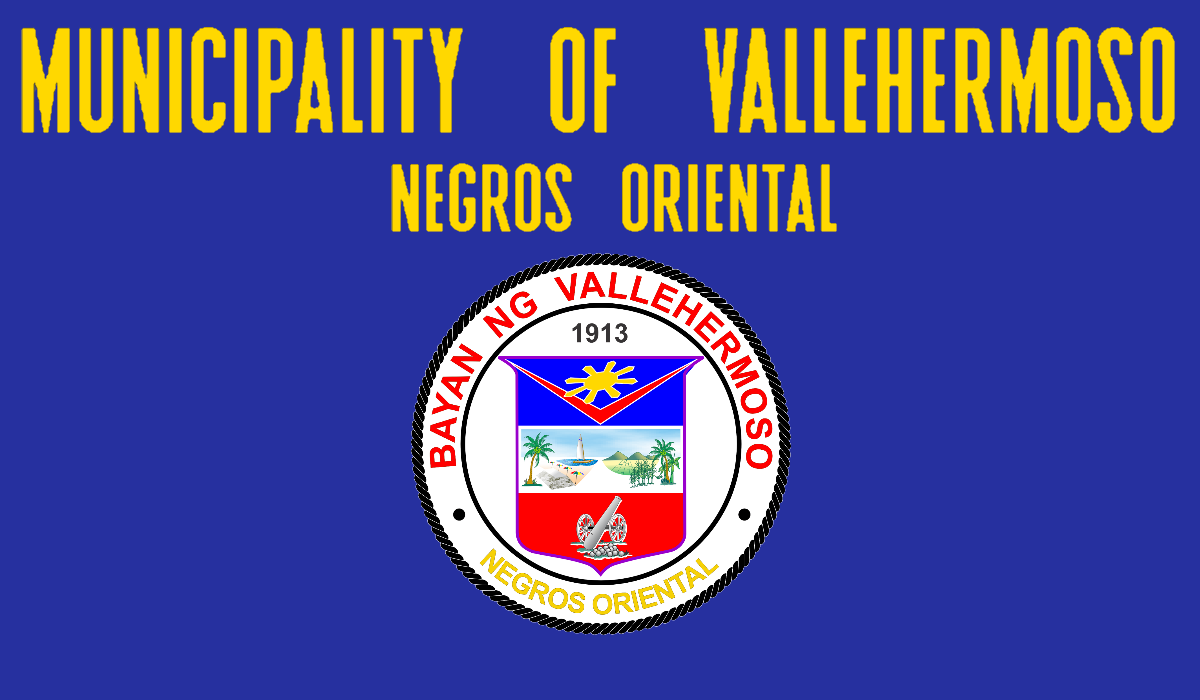
- Flag Seal
- Nickname: All-Around Suburb
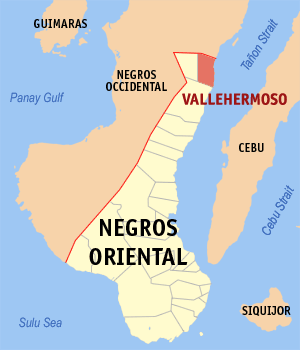
- Map of Negros Oriental with Vallehermoso highlighted
- Interactive map of Vallehermoso
- Location within the Philippines
- Coordinates: 10°20′N 123°19′E
- Country: Philippines
- Region: Negros Island Region
- Province: Negros Oriental
- District: 1st district
- Barangays: 15 (see Barangays)

Government
  - Type: Sangguniang Bayan
  - Mayor: Aloma Monica B. Serion (NPC)
  - Vice Mayor: Marianne S. Gustilo (NPC)
  - Representative: Emmanuel L. Iway (PFP)
  - Municipal Council: Members: Monika S. Gustilo; Clark Celso E. Serion; Oliver S. Bongoyan; Jeffrey B. Villegas; Pablo K. Repita; Janeth S. Caingcoy; Tita S. Ramos; Sofronio Altheo Q. Solidarios; Rey B. Serion ^{‡}; ‡ ex officio ABC president
  - Electorate: 25,245 voters (2025)

Area
  - Total: 101.25 km^{2} (39.09 sq mi)
- Elevation: 78 m (256 ft)
- Highest elevation: 520 m (1,710 ft)
- Lowest elevation: 0 m (0 ft)

Population (2024 census)
  - Total: 42,421
  - Density: 418.97/km^{2} (1,085.1/sq mi)
  - Households: 9,813

Economy
  - Income class: 2nd municipal income class
  - Poverty incidence: 40.27% (2023)
  - Revenue: ₱ 236.1 million (2024)
  - Assets: ₱ 513.5 million (2024)
  - Expenditure: ₱ 209.4 million (2024)
  - Liabilities: ₱ 88.35 million (2024)

Service provider
  - Electricity: Negros Oriental 1 Electric Cooperative (NORECO 1)
- Time zone: UTC+8 (PST)
- ZIP code: 6224
- PSGC: 074624000
- IDD : area code: +63 (0)35
- Native languages: Cebuano; Hiligaynon; Tagalog

Vallehermoso, officially the Municipality of Vallehermoso (Cebuano: Lungsod sa Vallehermoso; Hiligaynon: Banwa sang Vallehermoso; Tagalog: Bayan ng Vallehermoso), is a municipality in the province of Negros Oriental, Philippines. According to the 2024 census, it has a population of 42,421 people.

Main source of livelihood is through fishing and farming, while the vast majority is still dependent upon third hand expenditures.

== History ==
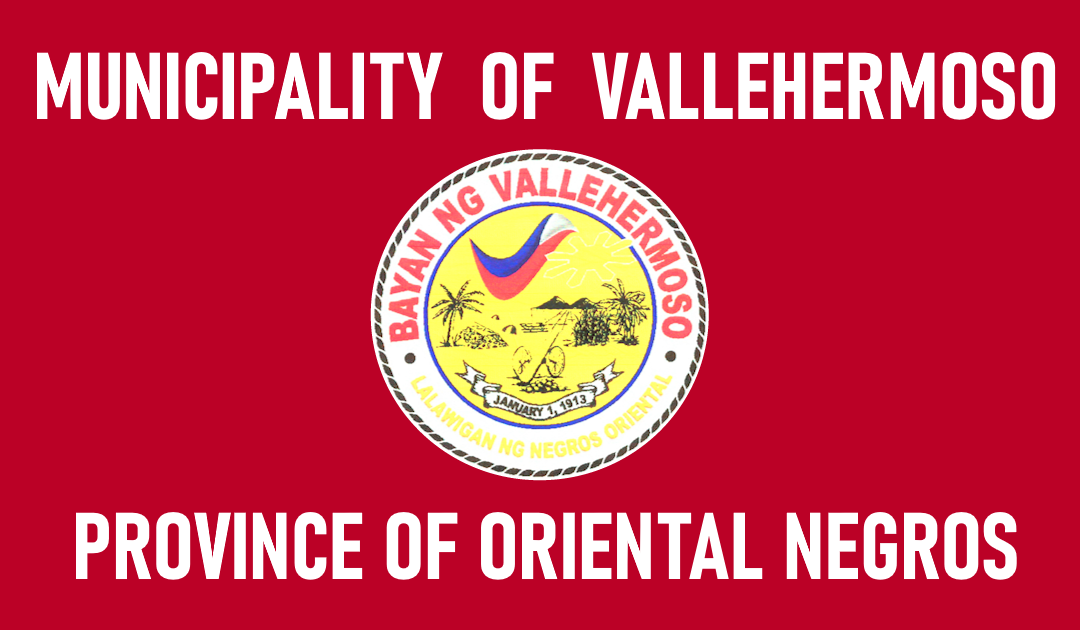
Former flag of Vallehermoso

The town was the official residence of the revolutionary leader and hero of Negros Oriental, Don Diego de la Viña y de la Rosa. Don Diego de la Viña shaped the beginnings of the municipality, “Valle hermoso” when he saw the beautiful valley. In 1881, Don Diego de la Viña came from Negros Occidental in search of territories to conquer. The land or valley he saw a top the mountain ranges including Kanlaon (pa-unlakan as Bukidnons named) was the wilderness and flats called Bagawines. Bukidnons, known to be unfriendly aboriginals inhabited the area. However, de la Viña sought the tribal chief, named Ka Saniko and his wife Bella Hermoza a truck and bus barter and spotter (citation needed).

For lands on coastal Bagawines, de la Viña offered wondrous articles from Iloilo, such as fine canes, well-crafted bolos and colorful patadyongs. Ka Saniko then moved further to Pinokawan. De la Viña with a number of Bukidnons cleared the land and constructed his residence, a casa tribunal and a chapel. In less than five years they transformed the valley into a hacienda of sugar cane, tobacco, coconut, rice and corn. He called it the “beautiful valley,” Vallehermoso. De la Viña bought, bartered and did everything else possible to enlarge his landholdings until it stretched from Molobolo on the boundary of Guihulngan, north to Macapso on the boundary of San Carlos and west to the slopes of Canlaon where he pastured his cattle and horses. He opened a road to Negros Occidental, which paved the way for his historic involvement in the local revolution against Spain. Don Diego de la Viña was an illustrado being born from a Spanish-Chinese parentage.

He grew up in Binondo, Manila but went to Basque, Asturias in Spain to earn his bachelor's degree in arts. Upon his return to Manila, he married a “Tagala” with whom he had four children. He brought them with him when he settled in Negros. Endowed with a pioneering spirit he searched for a place where he could establish a residence and fulfill his dream to carve out fortune. When he resided in Bagawines, he influenced the way of life of the bukidnons. They became civilized and tempered their warring tendencies. He inculcated with them the love of work and the idea of religion. He frowned on laziness. In the hacienda that De la Viña established, unemployment was not known. His work in the plantation made him physically strong and spiritually active. When his wife died, he remarried an Ilongga Doña Narcisa Geopano from the landed Geopano Clan.

He sired three children with his second wife. It was in the last quarter of 1898 when Don Diego de la Viña became involved in the revolution. His brother, Dr. Jose de la Viña was one of the delegates to the Malolos Congress. Dr. de la Viña regularly informed Don Diego of the latest development of the Republic government under Gen. Emilio Aguinaldo. Gen. Aguinaldo duly commissioned Don Diego de la Viña with the rank of General de Brigada, Commandante del Ejercito Filipino, Provincia de Negros Oriental. His son was also commissioned Lieutenant Colonel of the Infantry. He secretly trained his peasants how to handle a rifle. He turned their plowshares into bolos, “pinuti, “talibong”, “bahi”, spears and lances. Soon more and more men joined the group of de la Viña. He was soon around riding on a big white spotted horse during the “revolucionario”. De la Viña became known as the “Tigulang or the Grand Old Man”. He was considered a “cacique”, for he had the say in all appointments. He became the judge of local conflicts and designed the improvements for the place (source Negros Historian Prof. Penn Tulabing.Villanueva Larena, MPA a descendant of the Hermoso/ Olladas/ Serion and Bernus Clan an old Spanish family of this Town).

The Arrival of Iloilo's Lopez Clan

During the depression years of the Sugar industry in the 1920s, a Spanish company named Tabacalera foreclosed haciendas which could not pay their credits. One of them was the Hacienda of Don Diego de la Viña clan. According to Zaffy Ledesma, a historian in the Lopez clan, the foreclosed property was sold to Don Vicente Lopez Sr. around 1924. Don Vicente belonged to the Lopez clan of Jaro. His hacienda was subsequently divided into two farms: Hacienda Dona Elena named after his wife and was inherited by his son, Vicente Lopez Jr. Hacienda Lilia, named after Tiking ( Vicente Jr.) sister, was inherited by Lilia Lopez Jison. Rosario Lopez, niece of Vicente Lopez Jr., married Arthur Cooper and became a landowner in Pinocauan, Vallehermoso.

Creation of Municipality of Vallehermoso as a separate Municipality

The Municipality of Vallehermoso was created by virtue of Executive Order No. 19 signed by former Pres. Manuel A. Roxas. "Upon the recommendation of the Provincial Board of Oriental Negros and the Secretary of the Interior, and pursuant to the provisions of section sixty-eight of the Revised Administrative Code, the twenty-four municipalities of the Province of Oriental Negros, as established by section thirty-eight of the Revised Administrative Code, are hereby increased to twenty-five, by segregating from the municipality of Vallehermoso the barrios of Panubigan, Linothangan, Masolog, and Budlasan with all the sitios composing these barrios, and the sitio of Lucap of the barrio of Malaiba, and organizing the same into an independent municipality under the name of Canlaon, with the seat of government in the sitio of Mabigo, barrio of Panubigan."

Modern Times

On June 3, 2014, Monsignor Patrick Daniel Y. Parcon was appointed as the Bishop-elect of the Roman Catholic Diocese of Talibon, Bohol. Bishop Parcon, born in Vallehermoso in 1961, is a descendant of the Parcon clan in Sitio Tubod, Barangay Puan. He now holds the record of being the first son of Vallehermoso to be consecrated as Bishop, the first son of the Diocese of San Carlos with Vallehermoso as part of it, to be honored to assume the order of such title by Pope Francis.

== Geography ==
Vallehermoso is located right along the border with Negros Occidental. It is also roughly equidistant to three cities: north from Guihulngan, south from San Carlos, and east from Canlaon. Vallehermoso is 145 kilometres (90 mi) from Dumaguete and 115 kilometres (71 mi) from Bacolod.

=== Barangays ===
Vallehermoso is politically subdivided into 15 barangays. Each barangay consists of puroks and some have sitios.

PSGC	Barangay	Population			±% p.a.	
		2024		2010		
074624001	Bagawines	13.7%	5,803	5,688	▴	0.14%
074624002	Bairan	1.4%	610	419	▴	2.64%
074624005	Cabulihan	3.4%	1,427	1,320	▴	0.54%
074624003	Don Espiridion Villegas	4.8%	2,042	1,808	▴	0.85%
074624004	Guba	4.7%	1,974	2,096	▾	−0.42%
074624006	Macapso	3.5%	1,502	1,460	▴	0.20%
074624007	Malangsa	5.0%	2,124	1,787	▴	1.21%
074624008	Molobolo	4.7%	1,982	1,973	▴	0.03%
074624009	Maglahos	3.6%	1,525	1,235	▴	1.47%
074624010	Pinocawan (Pinucauan)	11.4%	4,845	4,098	▴	1.17%
074624011	Poblacion	11.6%	4,928	4,615	▴	0.46%
074624012	Puan	5.2%	2,186	1,627	▴	2.07%
074624013	Tabon	7.8%	3,320	2,854	▴	1.06%
074624014	Tagbino	9.6%	4,081	3,829	▴	0.44%
074624015	Ulay	5.7%	2,430	2,134	▴	0.91%
	Total		42,421	36,943	▴	0.96%

=== Climate ===
Climate data for Vallehermoso, Negros Oriental
Month	Jan	Feb	Mar	Apr	May	Jun	Jul	Aug	Sep	Oct	Nov	Dec	Year
Mean daily maximum °C (°F)	29 (84)	30 (86)	31 (88)	32 (90)	31 (88)	31 (88)	30 (86)	29 (84)	30 (86)	30 (86)	29 (84)	29 (84)	30 (86)
Mean daily minimum °C (°F)	23 (73)	23 (73)	23 (73)	24 (75)	25 (77)	25 (77)	25 (77)	25 (77)	25 (77)	25 (77)	24 (75)	23 (73)	24 (75)
Average precipitation mm (inches)	100 (3.9)	75 (3.0)	90 (3.5)	101 (4.0)	183 (7.2)	242 (9.5)	215 (8.5)	198 (7.8)	205 (8.1)	238 (9.4)	194 (7.6)	138 (5.4)	1,979 (77.9)
Average rainy days	14.9	11.3	14.5	17.4	26.4	28.4	28.5	27.5	26.9	28.4	24.2	17.2	265.6
Source: Meteoblue

== Demographics ==
Population census of Vallehermoso
Year	Pop.	±% p.a.
1918	9,726	—
1939	21,677	+3.89%
1948	22,119	+0.22%
1960	22,932	+0.30%
1970	20,418	−1.15%
1975	23,326	+2.71%
1980	25,043	+1.43%
1990	27,945	+1.10%
1995	31,110	+2.03%
2000	33,914	+1.87%
2007	34,933	+0.41%
2010	36,943	+2.06%
2015	38,259	+0.67%
2020	40,779	+1.35%
2024	42,421	+0.95%
Source: Philippine Statistics Authority

People in Vallehermoso are mostly farmers and fishermen while the minorities are average earners dependent upon the employment opportunities yielded by the government and the business sector. At least half of the residents in the Central Vallehermoso are graduate in secondary education while a considerable number are professionals in the fields of Education and basic civic services.

=== Language ===
Cebuano is the main dialect of Vallehermoso but Hiligaynon is also spoken as the municipality borders Negros Occidental.

== Economy ==
Poverty incidence of Vallehermoso (%)

Source: Philippine Statistics Authority

Vallehermoso is composed mostly of Agricultural lands typically good for growing almost all kinds of crops although much of the uses of these agricultural areas are invested on Sugarcane Farming. Corn is also another product in the area hence the people are largely dependent upon corn as their staple food. Coconut is also another source of income for most of the farmers through “tuba” or Coconut Wine, Vinegar and Lambanog. Ingenious materials such as broomsticks, bags and fashion accessories are also being made by the town's people as another source of income. Some other agricultural products such as; Banana, Cassava, Rice and coffee are also abundant in the area.

=== Tourism ===
- Annual Town Fiesta: May 15
- Chartered day celebration: January 1 and 2

== Education ==
The public schools in the town of Vallehermoso are administered by one school district under the Schools Division of Guihulngan City.

Elementary schools:

- Bairan Elementary School — Bairan
- Banban Elementary School — Sitio Banban, Guba
- Cabulihan Elementary School — Cabulihan
- Dominador A. Paras Memorial Elementary School — Tagbino
- Don Esperidion Villegas Elementary School — Don Esperidion Villegas
- Don Julian dela Viña Villegas Elementary School — Sitio Bay-ang, Tabon
- Don Vicente Lopez Sr. Memorial School — Bagawines
- Guba Elementary School — Guba
- Macapso Elementary School — Macapso
- Maglahos Elementary School — Maglahos
- Malangsa Elementary School — Malangsa
- Molobolo Elementary School — Molobolo
- Paliran Elementary School — Sitio Paliran, Pinocawan
- Pinucauan Elementary School — Pinocawan
- Puan Elementary School — Puan
- Puti-an Elementary School — Sitio Puti-an, Pinocawan
- Tabon Elementary School — Tabon
- Tolotolo Elementary School — Sitio Tolotolo, Ulay
- Ulay Elementary School — Ulay
- Vallehermoso Central Elementary School — D. dela Viña Street, Poblacion

High schools:

- Guba High School — Guba
- Pinucauan High School — Pinocawan
- Rafaela R. Labang National High School (formerly Tagbino NHS) — Tagbino
- Tagbino Senior High School — Tagbino
- Vallehermoso National High School — Nat'l Highway, Poblacion

Private Schools

- St. Francis High School — Nat'l Highway, Poblacion

== Notable people ==
- Bishop Daniel Patrick Yee Parcon - current bishop of the Roman Catholic Diocese of Talibon in Bohol
