= Martín Muñoz de las Posadas =

- Municipality
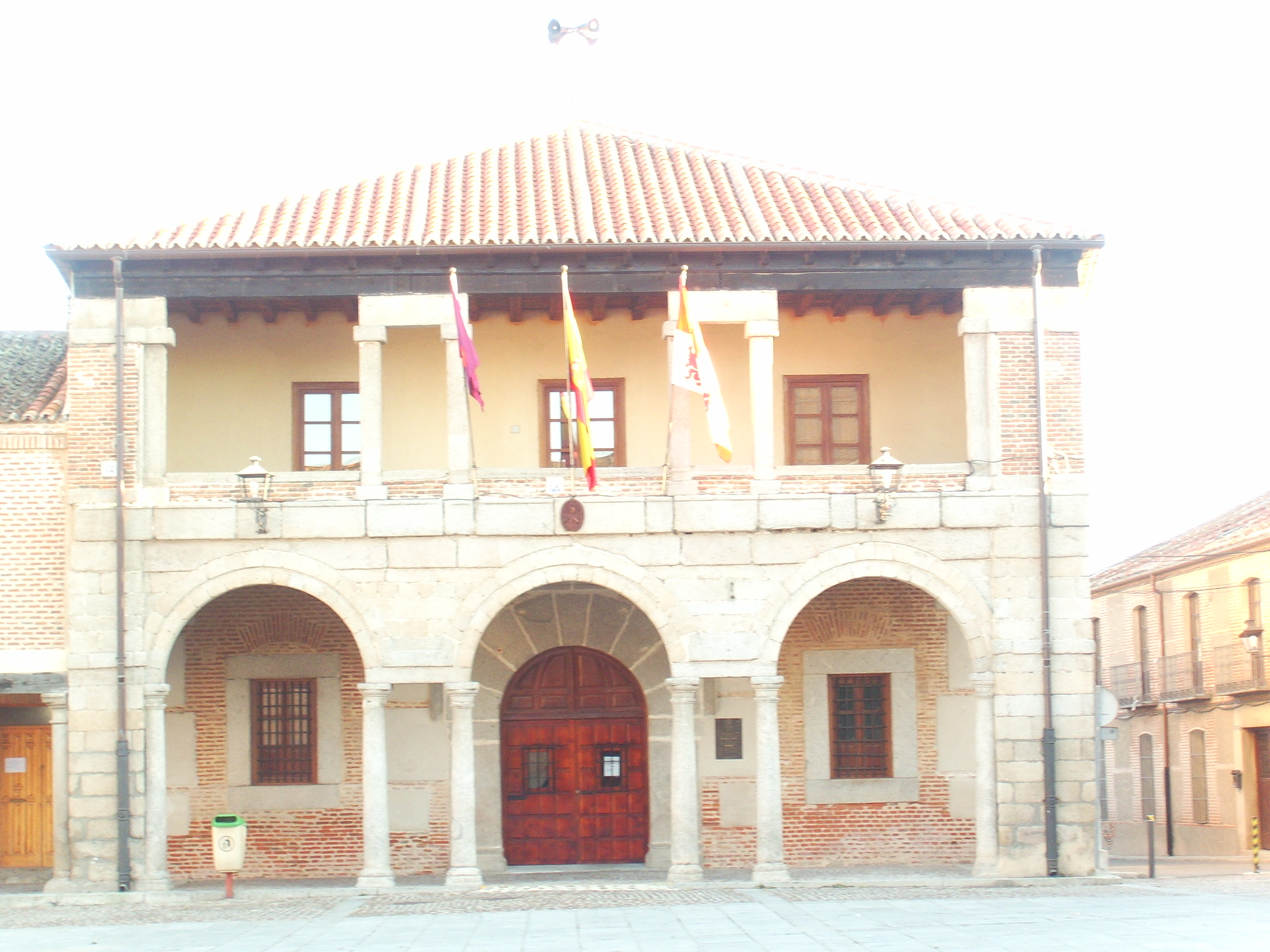
- Martín Muñoz de las Posadas Town hall.

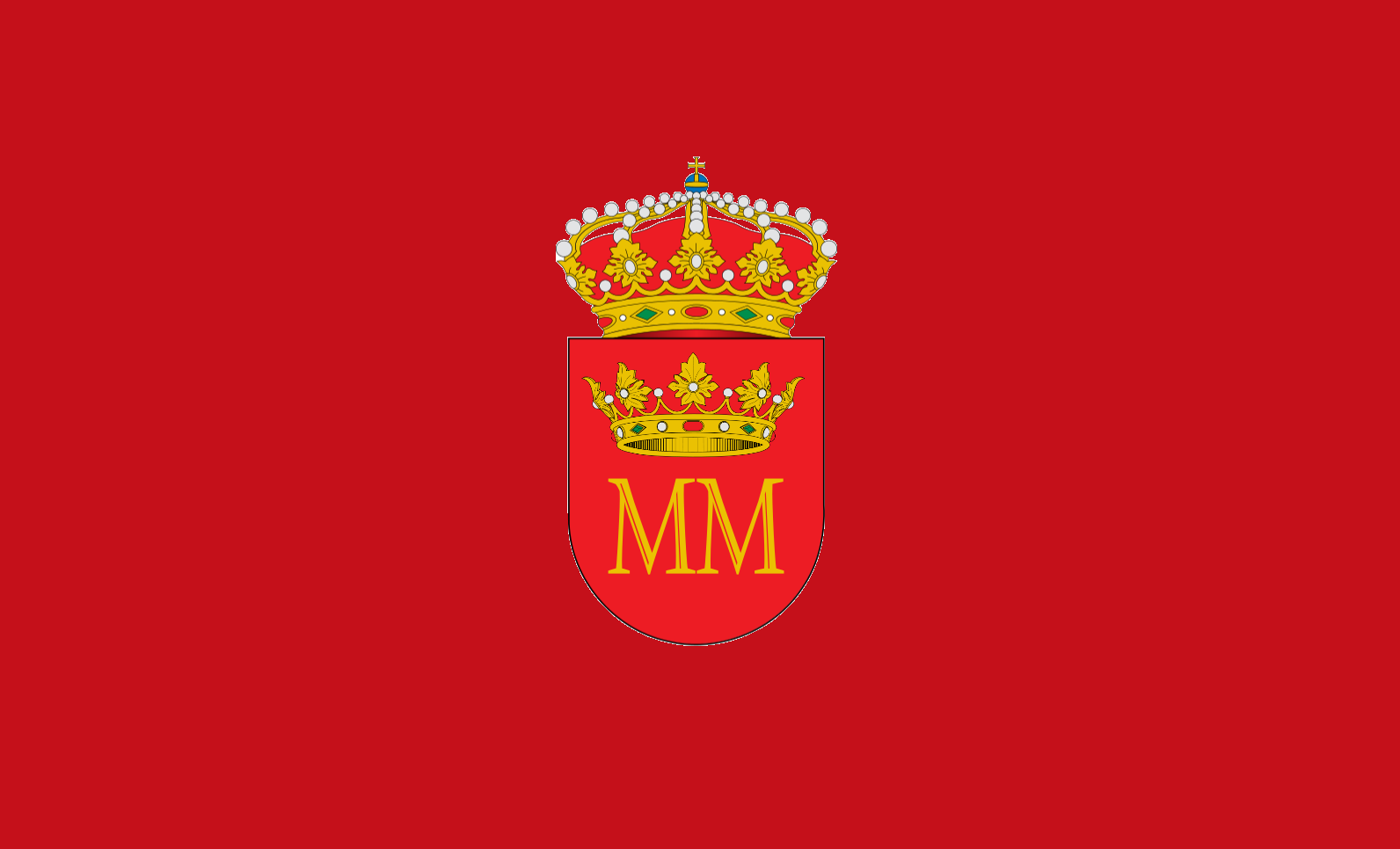
- Flag Coat of arms

- Location in Spain. Martín Muñoz de las Posadas (Spain)
- Coordinates: 40°59′46″N 4°35′45″W
- Country: Spain
- Autonomous community: Castile and León
- Province: Segovia
- Municipality: Martín Muñoz de las Posadas

Area
  - Total: 45 km^{2} (17 sq mi)

Population (2025-01-01)
  - Total: 251
  - Density: 5.6/km^{2} (14/sq mi)
- Time zone: UTC+1 (CET)
  - Summer (DST): UTC+2 (CEST)
- Website: Official website

Martín Muñoz de las Posadas is a municipality located in the province of Segovia, Castile and León, Spain. According to the 2004 census (INE), the municipality has a population of 439 inhabitants.
