= Archdiocese of Cebu =

Catholic archdiocese in the Philippines

Metropolitan Archdiocese of Cebu Archidioecesis Metropolitae Nominis Iesu o Caebuana: Arkidiyosesis Metropolitano sa Labing Balaan nga Ngalan ni Hesus sa Sugbo; Kalakhang Arkidiyosesis ng Kabanal-banalang Ngalan ni Hesus sa Cebu; Arquidiócesis Metropolitano del Santísimo Nombre de Jesús de Cebú

Catholic
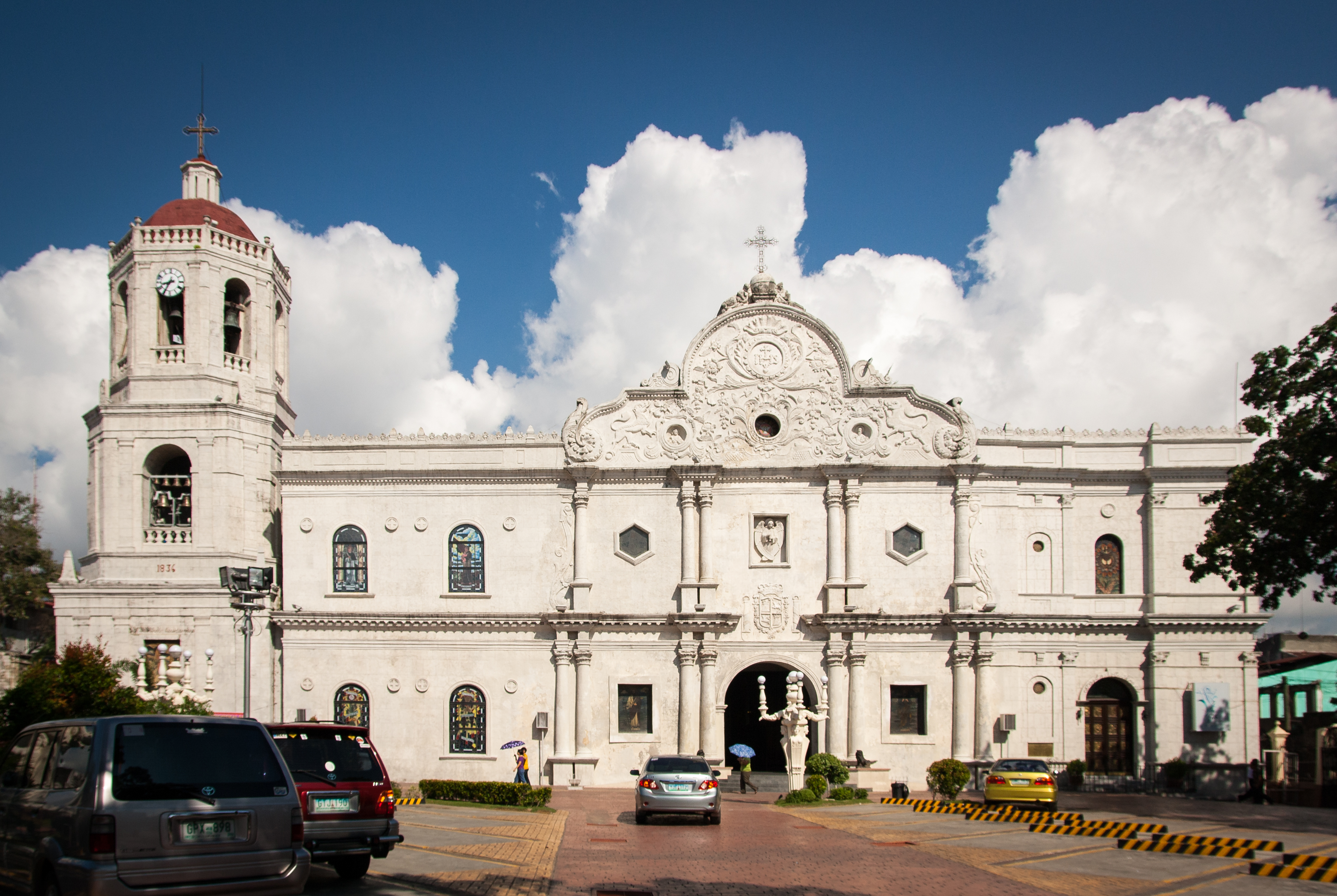
- Cebu Metropolitan Cathedral

- Coat of arms, 2022 design

Location
- Country: Philippines
- Territory: Cebu
- Ecclesiastical province: Cebu
- Metropolitan: Cebu
- Coordinates: 10.2958°N 123.9030°E

Statistics
- Area: 5,088 km^{2} (1,964 sq mi)
- Population: Total; Catholics: (as of 2022); 5,388,718; 4,678,039 (86.8%)
- Parishes: 176 parishes (including quasi-parishes); 9 mission stations

Information
- Denomination: Catholic Church
- Sui iuris church: Latin Church
- Rite: Roman Rite
- Established: August 14, 1595; 431 years ago (diocese); April 28, 1934; 92 years ago (archdiocese)
- Cathedral: Metropolitan Cathedral and Parish of St. Vitalis
- Patron saint: Vitalis of Milan; Nuestra Señora de Guadalupe de Cebú; Pedro Calungsod
- Secular priests: 348 (2022)

Current leadership
- Pope: Leo XIV
- Metropolitan Archbishop: Alberto Uy
- Suffragans: Precioso Cantillas (Maasin); Julito Cortes (Dumaguete); Daniel Parcon (Talibon); Crispin Varquez (Tagbilaran)
- Vicar General: Vicente Rey Penagunda; Rogelio Fuentes
- Bishops emeritus: José S. Palma; Antonio Racelis Rañola

Map
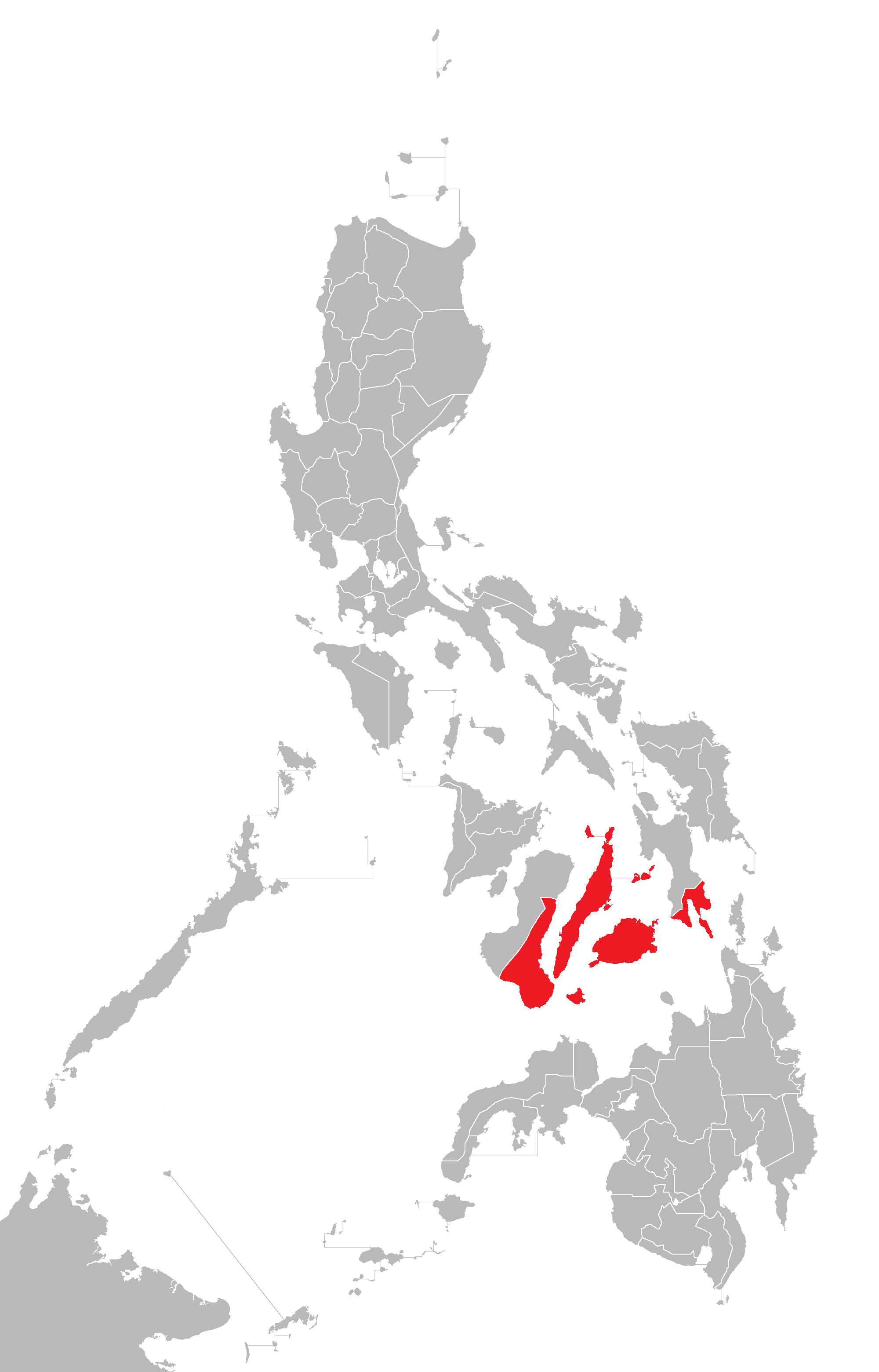
- Jurisdiction of the metropolitan see within the Philippines

The Metropolitan Archdiocese of Cebu (more formally the Metropolitan Archdiocese of the Most Holy Name of Jesus in Cebu; Latin: Archidioecesis Metropolitae Nominis Iesu o Caebuana; Filipino: Kalakhang Arkidiyosesis ng Kabanal-banalang Ngalan ni Hesus sa Cebu; Cebuano: Arkidiyosesis Metropolitano sa Labing Balaan nga Ngalan ni Hesus sa Sugbo; Spanish: Arquidiocesis Metropolitano del Santisimo Nombre de Jesus de Cebu) is a Latin Church archdiocese of the Catholic Church in the Philippines and one of the ecclesiastical provinces of the Catholic Church in the country. It is composed of the entire civil province of Cebu, including its outer islands of Mactan, Bantayan, and Camotes. The jurisdiction, Cebu, is considered as the fount of Christianity in the Far East.

The seat of the archdiocese is the Metropolitan Cathedral and Parish of St. Vitalis, more commonly known as the Cebu Metropolitan Cathedral. The archdiocese honors Our Lady of Guadalupe de Cebú as its patroness, Vitalis of Milan as its patron and titular saint, and Pedro Calungsod (the second Filipino saint) as its secondary patron saint. Its most recent archbishop is Alberto Uy, who was installed on September 30, 2025. As of 2013, the archdiocese registered a total of 4,609,590 baptized Catholics.

== History ==
=== Magellan's arrival and antecedents ===
The history of the future Archdiocese of Cebu began with the arrival of Ferdinand Magellan in Cebu in 1521. The church anchored in that year by the native Cebuanos' profession of faith in Christ, baptism, the daily celebration of the Mass, and the chaplain of the expedition, Pedro Valderrama being the legitimate pastor for their spiritual needs.

In Cebu the first baptism was made (April 14, 1521); hence, Rajah Humabon and the rest of the natives became the very first Filipino Christians. In the island also was the first Mass in which Filipino converts participated. Also in the territory the first resistance against the Mohammedan advance from the south. The first Philippine Christian feast dedicated to the Sto. Niño was instituted and celebrated there. The first recorded confession and the last rites of an accused inhabitant transpired. The very first temples were erected (the Cebu Metropolitan Cathedral and Basilica del Santo Niño) in the Philippines. The first Christian marriage transpired with Isabel, the niece of Rajah Tupas and Andres, the Greek caulker of Legazpi, and their children baptized representing the first infant baptisms.

However, immediately after its inception during the aftermath of the Battle of Mactan, the Church of Cebu experienced decadence due to lack of shepherds to enforce and edify the natives on the faith. Most of the natives materially apostatized, while others clung unto the image of the Santo Niño (the first Christian icon in the Philippines given as a baptismal gift by Magellan). The unintended negligence lasted for 44 years until it was re-established in 1565 by the arrival of Miguel López de Legazpi and Fray Andrés de Urdaneta. The remnant of the Cebuano Church in 1521, as evident in the person of Rajah Tupas, was resuscitated by the Augustinians as an abbey nullius (an equivalent of a diocese) when the formal evangelization of the Philippines commenced with Urdaneta as the first prelate. The oversight of the natives was then succeeded to Fray Diego de Herrera who would later re-baptized Tupas and his servants in 1568. Adelantado Miguel Lopez de Legazpi established his government in Cebu, thus the first capital of the Philippines.

The church expanded from Cebu when the remaining missionaries led by Diego de Herrera were forced northwest temporarily due to conflict with the Portuguese and laid the foundations of the Christian community in Panay in around 1569. In 1570, the second batch of missionaries reached Cebu. The island became the ecclesiastical "seat" as it was the center for evangelization. A notable missionary was Alfonso Jimenez, who travelled and penetrated the Camarines region through the islands of Masbate, Leyte, Samar, and Burias and founded the church there. He was called the first apostle of the region.

By 1571, Herrera who was assigned as chaplain of Legazpi, from Panay advanced further north and founded the local church community in Manila. There, Legazpi transferred the seat of government though Cebu remained the spiritual capital of the country. In 1572, the Spaniards led by Juan de Salcedo marched from Manila further north with the second batch of Augustinian missionaries and pioneered the evangelization to the communities in the Ilocos (starting with Vigan) and the Cagayan regions.

=== Diocese of Cebu ===
On February 6, 1579, the Philippines' first diocese, the Diocese of Manila, was established as a suffragan diocese of the See of Mexico. On August 14, 1595, Pope Clement VIII issued four bulls to Spain: one with the incipit Super universas orbis ecclesias elevating the See of Manila to a metropolitan archdiocese; and three with the incipit Super specula militantis Ecclesiae erecting the three suffragan dioceses of Manila, which were the Diocese of Cebu, the Diocese of Nueva Cáceres, and the Diocese of Nueva Segovia. The Diocese of Cebu's first bishop was Pedro de Agurto, an Augustinian. As a diocese, Cebú had a very extensive territory which then included the whole of the Visayas, Mindanao and "more southern islands"; also it extended farther to the Pacific such as the Marianas, Carolines, and Palau.

However, it lost territory repeatedly:

- on May 27, 1865, to establish then Diocese of (Santa Isabel de) Jaro (now an archdiocese)
- on September 17, 1902, to establish Apostolic Prefecture of Mariana Islands
- on April 10, 1910, to establish Diocese of Zamboanga and Diocese of Calbayog
- on July 15, 1932, to establish Diocese of Bacolod

=== Archdiocese of Cebu ===
On April 28, 1934, Pope Pius XI promulgated an apostolic constitution with the incipit Romanorum Pontificum semper separating the dioceses of Cebu, Calbayog, Jaro, Bacolod, Zamboanga and Cagayan de Oro from the ecclesiastical province of Manila. The same constitution elevated the diocese into an archdiocese while placing all the newly separated dioceses under a new ecclesiastical province with Cebu as the new metropolitan see. The last suffragan bishop, Gabriel M. Reyes, was promoted as its first archbishop.

On November 8, 1941, it lost territory to establish Diocese of Tagbilaran as its suffragan.

Cebu was visited by Pope John Paul II in February 1981. In his Homily for Families (February 19, 1981), the supreme pontiff called the island as the birthplace of the faith:

Finding myself in this important city known as the cradle of Christianity in the Philippines, I want to express my deep joy and profound thanksgiving to the Lord of history. The thought that for 450 years the light of the Gospel has shone with undimmed brightness in this land and on its people is cause for great rejoicing.

Between November 10, 1985, and March 1, 1986, the archdiocese held its Fourth Diocesan Synod of Cebu at the Seminaryo Mayor de San Carlos.

It hosted the 51st International Eucharistic Congress from January 24 to 31, 2016.

=== Sugbuswak: Division to three dioceses ===
Plans to divide the Archdiocese of Cebu was first laid during the pastoral leadership of Cardinal Julio Rosales. It was raised again on August 20, 2002, during the pastoral leadership of then-Archbishop Cardinal Ricardo Vidal.

The plan was revived again on December 31, 2022, when Archbishop Jose S. Palma announced a feasibility study on the planned division of the archdiocese. The archdiocese coined the term "Sugbuswak", derived from "Cebu" and the Cebuano word "buswak", referring to the flowering or blossoming of new dioceses. The plan calls for the erection of two new suffragan dioceses in Danao, which would cover the northern part of the civil province of Cebu; and in Carcar, covering the southern part of the province. The territory of the metropolitan archdiocese would be reduced to the central part of the province, including Cebu City and its neighboring towns, as well as the island of Mactan. The plan aims for better pastoral management in churches.

During its 126th Plenary Assembly in Kalibo, Aklan in July 2023, the Catholic Bishops' Conference of the Philippines (CBCP) unanimously approved the planned division of the Archdiocese of Cebu. It also received support from the Cebuano people. Archbishop Palma presented the proposal to the Holy See on March 11, 2024, as part of his ad limina visit to Pope Francis.

In December 2024, Archbishop José S. Palma suspended indefinitely the celebration of Traditional Tridentine Mass (TLM) until further notice.

== Coat of arms ==
The coat of arms used from 1949 to 2009, designed by Filipino ecclesiastical heraldist and Lingayen-Dagupan Archbishop Mariano Madriaga

The coat of arms used from 2009 to 2022

The ecclesiastical arms of the Archdiocese of Cebu was redesigned by a professional Italian heraldic artist, Sig. Marco Foppoli, as commissioned by the priests-secretaries of the Office of the Archbishop in the first quarter of 2021, with the facilitation and benefaction of Msgr. Jan Thomas V. Limchua.

The re-designed coat of arms of the archdiocese consists of a simple yet traditional shield, which is the most commonly used form in ecclesiastical heraldry. In a chapé ("mantled") ployé partition, which is formed by two arched lines drawn from the center chief to the sides, the shield itself is divided into two fields: the upper field, in red (gules); and the lower field, in blue (azure).

The upper field of red represents the Niño de Cebu (Bato Balani sa Gugma, or Magnet of Love), whose very image, which at first was a gift during the first baptism five hundred years ago, has now become the symbol of the Catholic faith in Cebu.

On this same field are two lions: the first lion, in gold, is emblazoned with the coat of arms of the Kingdom of Castile; while the other, in silver, is emblazoned with the personal coat of arms of Ferdinand Magellan—these two elements were present in the original coat of arms granted to the archdiocese. Both refer to the Hispanic origin and nascent beginning of Catholicism in Cebu, the cradle of Christianity in the Philippines.

These two lions support the stylized monogram of the Holy Name of Jesus inside a stylized image of the sun—symbolizing Christ as the light of the world. It is deliberately placed at the top center of the arm, representing the titular of the archdiocese. It also recalls the life and ministry of Jesus in the words of Paul (Letter to the Philippians): "…he humbled himself, becoming obedient to death, even death on a cross. Because of this, God greatly exalted him and bestowed on him the name that is above every name, that at the name of Jesus every knee should bend, of those in heaven and on earth and under the earth, and every tongue confess that Jesus Christ is Lord, to the glory of God the Father." (Phil. 2:7–11)

The field of red also honors the Visayan Proto-Martyr, Pedro Calungsod.

The lower field of blue symbolizes Our Lady and her motherly mantle of love and compassion for the Cebuano faithful as also portrayed by the monogram "Auspice Maria" (Under the Protection of Mary) with a gold crown (above), a silver crescent (below), and gold gloriole (around the monogram). This imagery specifically refers to her image and title, Our Lady of Guadalupe de Cebu, through whose intercession, and by God's grace flowing from above, has saved Cebu from the cholera epidemic of 1902. On 16 July 2006, Virgen de Guadalupe de Cebu was canonically crowned by the authority of Pope Benedict XVI as patroness of the archdiocese.

The upward, arrow tip-like shape of the blue field can be understood as a reminder to the Cebuano faithful that a deep devotion to the Virgin Mary inevitably leads to a greater love for her Divine Son, Our Lord. This is reminiscent of the traditional aphorism, "Ad Jesum per Mariam" (to Jesus, through Mary).

The entire shield is surmounted by the conventional heraldic elements identifying it to be the coat of arms of an archdiocese, namely a miter, and the crossed crozier and archiepiscopal cross.

Written on a scroll, below the arms, is the Motto of the Archdiocese: "Sanctum Nomen Eius," which means "Holy is His Name," taken from Mary's Magnificat (Luke 1:49).

== Ordinaries ==
=== Prelates of Cebu ===
(Note: The religious superiors, in this case the Augustinians in Cebu, functioned as ordinaries in mission territories with no diocese through the papal bull Omnimodam auctoritatem nostram made by Pope Adrian VI. Thus, consequently making the first Augustinian superiors as Prelates of Cebu. Their prelacy are more historical than canonical. The modern equivalent of this is a Territorial Superior. See more in gcatholic.org.)

- Andrés de Urdaneta (April 1565 – June 1565), considered as first prelate of the Philippines.
- Diego de Herrera (June 1565 – 1569)
- Martín de Rada (1569–1572)
- Alfonso Jimenez (1575–1577)

=== Bishops and archbishops ===
| Bishop | | Period in office | Notes | Coat of arms |
Bishops of Cebu (August 14, 1595 – April 28, 1934)
| 1 | Pedro de Agurto | August 30, 1595 – October 14, 1608 (13 years, 45 days) | Died in office | |
| 2 | Pedro de Arce | September 17, 1612 – October 16, 1645 (33 years, 29 days) | Died in office | |
| 3 | Juan Velez | January 26, 1660 – 1661 (approximately 1 year) | Bishop-elect; died before his episcopal consecration | |
| 3 | Juan López | April 23, 1663 – November 14, 1672 (9 years, 205 days) | Appointed archbishop of Manila | |
| 4 | Diego de Aguilar | November 16, 1676 – October 1, 1692 (15 years, 320 days) | Died in office | |
| 5 | Miguel Bayot | May 13, 1697 – August 28, 1700 (3 years, 107 days) | Died in office | |
| 6 | Pedro Sanz de la Vega y Landaverde | January 26, 1705 – December 17, 1717 (12 years, 325 days) | Died in office | |
| – | Sebastián Foronda (apostolic administrator) | March 2, 1722 – May 20, 1728 (6 years, 79 days) | Died in office | – |
| 7 | Manuel de Ocio y Campo | January 20, 1734 – July 21, 1737 (3 years, 182 days) | Died in office | |
| 8 | Protacio Cabezas | August 29, 1740 – February 3, 1753 (12 years, 158 days) | Died in office | |
| 9 | Miguel Lino de Ezpeleta | July 18, 1757 – 1771 (approximately 14 years) | Died in office | |
| 10 | Mateo Joaquin Rubio de Arevalo | November 13, 1775 – 1788 (approximately 13 years) | Died in office | |
| 11 | Ignacio de Salamanca | September 24, 1792 – February 1802 (approximately 9 years) | Died in office | |
| 12 | Joaquín Encabo de la Virgen de Sopetrán | August 20, 1804 – November 8, 1818 (14 years, 80 days) | Died in office | |
| 13 | Francisco Genovés | March 21, 1825 – August 1, 1827 (2 years, 133 days) | Died in office | |
| 14 | Santos Gómez Marañón | September 28, 1829 – October 23, 1840 (11 years, 25 days) | Died in office | |
| 15 | Romualdo Jimeno Ballesteros | January 19, 1846 – March 17, 1872 (26 years, 58 days) | Died in office | |
| 16 | Benito Romero de Madridejos | January 28, 1876 – November 4, 1885 (9 years, 280 days) | Died in office | |
| 17 | Martín García y Alcocer | June 7, 1886 – July 30, 1904 (18 years, 53 days) | Resigned | |
| 18 | Thomas A. Hendrick | July 17, 1903 – November 29, 1909 (6 years, 135 days) | Died in office | |
| 19 | Juan Bautista Gorordo | July 2, 1910 – June 19, 1931 (20 years, 352 days) | Resigned | |
| 20 | Gabriel M. Reyes | July 29, 1932 – April 28, 1934 (1 year, 273 days) | Elevated to the rank of archbishop | |
Metropolitan archbishops of Cebu (April 28, 1934 – present)
| 1 | Gabriel M. Reyes | April 28, 1934 – August 25, 1949 (15 years, 119 days) | Appointed coadjutor archbishop of Manila | |
| 2 | Julio Cardinal Rosales y Ras | December 17, 1949 – August 24, 1982 (32 years, 250 days) | Retired from office | |
| 3 | Ricardo J. Cardinal Vidal | August 24, 1982 – October 15, 2010 (28 years, 52 days) | Retired from office | |
| 4 | Jose S. Palma | January 13, 2011 – September 30, 2025 (14 years, 260 days) | Retired from office | |
| 5 | Alberto S. Uy | September 30, 2025 – present (1 year, 27 days) | | |

=== Coadjutor archbishops ===
List of coadjutor archbishops of the archdiocese of Cebu
| Bishop | | Period in office | Titular see | Notes | Coat of arms |
|---|---|---|---|---|---|
| 1 | Manuel Sandalo Salvador | January 26, 1973 – July 14, 1996 (23 years, 170 days) | Zarna | Died in office | |
| 2 | Ricardo Jamin Vidal | April 13, 1981 – August 24, 1982 (2 years, 217 days) | – | Succeeded as archbishop | |

=== Auxiliary bishops ===
List of auxiliary bishops of the archdiocese of Cebu
| Bishop | | Period in office | Titular see | Notes | Coat of arms |
|---|---|---|---|---|---|
| 1 | Juan Durán | April 13, 1681 – 1691 (approximately 10 years) | Zenopolis in Lycia | Died in office | |
| 2 | Juan Bautista Gorordo y Perfecto | June 24, 1909 – April 2, 1910 (282 days) | Nilopolis | Succeeded as bishop of Cebu | |
| 3 | Manuel Sandalo Salvador | January 19, 1967 – October 21, 1969 (2 years, 275 days) | Nasbinca | Appointed bishop of Palo | |
| 4 | Nicolas Mollenedo Mondejar | August 30, 1970 – December 19, 1974 (4 years, 111 days) | Grumentum | Appointed bishop of Romblon | |
| 5 | Jesus Armamento Dosado | January 25, 1978 – June 4, 1979 (1 year, 130 days) | Nabala | Appointed auxiliary bishop of Cagayan de Oro, later archbishop of Ozamis | |
| 6 | Angel Nacorda Lagdameo | August 12, 1980 – January 31, 1986 (5 years, 172 days) | Oreto | Appointed bishop of Dumaguete | |
| 7 | Camilo Diaz Gregorio | March 29, 1987 – May 20, 1989 (2 years, 52 days) (appointed January 12, 1987) | Girus | Appointed bishop of Bacolod | |
| 8 | Leopoldo Sumaylo Tumulak | March 16, 1987 – November 28, 1992 (5 years, 257 days) (appointed January 12, 1987) | Lesvi | Appointed bishop of Tagbilaran | |
| 9 | Emilio Layon Bataclan | April 19, 1990 – May 3, 1995 (5 years, 14 days); June 21, 2004 – October 1, 2015 (11 years, 102 days) | Gunela (1990–1995); Septimunicia (2004–2015) | Appointed bishop of Iligan, reappointed auxiliary bishop of Cebu | |
| 10 | Antonio Racelis Rañola | April 4, 1990 – October 2, 2003 (13 years, 181 days) | Claternae | Resigned | |
| 11 | Jose Serofia Palma | January 13, 1998 – January 13, 1999 (1 year, 0 days) | Vazari-Didda | Appointed bishop of Calbayog, later archbishop of Cebu | |
| 12 | Precioso Dacalos Cantillas | July 12, 1995 – January 20, 1998 (2 years, 192 days) | Vicus Caesaris | Appointed bishop of Maasin | |
| 13 | John Forrosuelo Du | January 6, 1998 – April 21, 2001 (3 years, 105 days) | Timici | Appointed bishop of Dumaguete; later archbishop of Palo | |
| 14 | Antonieto Dumagan Cabajog | March 16, 1999 – April 21, 2001 (2 years, 36 days) | Reperi | Appointed bishop of Surigao | |
| 15 | Julito Buhisan Cortes | January 8, 2002 – September 28, 2013 (11 years, 263 days) | Severiana | Appointed bishop of Dumaguete | |
| 16 | Isabelo Caiban Abarquez | February 18, 2003 – June 19, 2004 (1 year, 122 days) | Talaptula | Appointed auxiliary bishop of Palo | |
| 17 | Oscar Jaime Llaneta Florencio | September 4, 2015 – March 2, 2019 (3 years, 179 days) | Lestrona | Appointed military ordinary of the Philippines | |
| 18 | Dennis Cabanada Villarojo | August 10, 2015 – May 14, 2019 (3 years, 277 days) | Gisipa | Appointed bishop of Malolos | |
| 19 | Midyphil Bermejo Billones | August 27, 2019 – February 2, 2025 (5 years, 159 days) | Tagarata | Appointed archbishop of Jaro | |
| 20 | Ruben Caballero Labajo | August 19, 2022 – October 15, 2024 (2 years, 57 days) | Abbir Maius | Appointed the first bishop of the Diocese of Prosperidad | |

== Suffragan dioceses and bishops ==
The ecclesiastical province of Cebu comprises the metropolitan's own archbishopric and the following suffragan sees:

| Diocese | Bishop | Period in office | Coat of arms |
|---|---|---|---|
| Dumaguete (Negros Oriental and Siquijor) | Julito B. Cortes | December 5, 2013 – present (12 years, 326 days) | |
| Maasin (Southern Leyte) | Precioso D. Cantillas | March 11, 1998 – present (27 years, 320 days) | |
| Tagbilaran (Bohol) | Crispin B. Varquez | October 27, 2026 – present (0 days) | |
| Talibon (Bohol) | Patrick Daniel Y. Parcon | August 26, 2014 – present (12 years, 62 days) | |

== See also ==
- Catholic Church in the Philippines
- Archdiocese of Manila
- Archdiocese of Caceres
- Diocese of Talibon
- List of the Catholic dioceses of the Philippines
- Cebu Catholic Television Network

== Sources and external links ==
- Official website
- GCatholic with incumbent bio links
- Catholic Encyclopedia: Cebu
- Archdiocese of Cebu on the Catholic Bishops Conference of the Philippines website
- Archdiocese of Cebu Catholic-Hierarchy.org
- Redesigned Coat of Arms
