= Metropolitan Cathedral of the Immaculate Conception =

Metropolitan Cathedral of the Immaculate Conception may refer to:

- Zamboanga Cathedral, seat of the Roman Catholic Archdiocese of Zamboanga, in the Philippines
- Immaculate Conception Cathedral, Managua, seat of the Roman Catholic Archdiocese of Managua, in Nicaragua
