= Julito Cortes =

Catholic prelate

The Most Reverend Julito B. Cortes D.D., S.Th.D.
- Bishop of Dumaguete
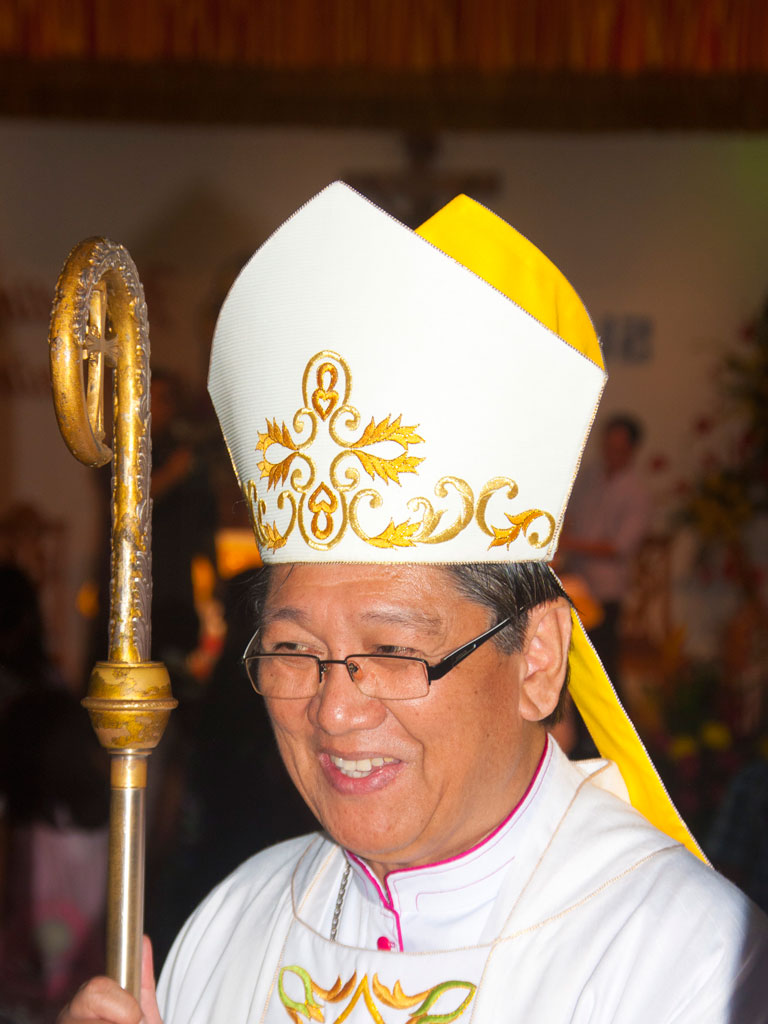
- Cortes in 2014
- Church: Roman Catholic Church
- Province: Cebu
- Diocese: Dumaguete
- See: Dumaguete
- Appointed: September 28, 2013
- Installed: December 5, 2013
- Predecessor: John F. Du
- Other posts: Auxiliary Bishop of Cebu (2002–2013); Titular Bishop of Severiana, Tunisia (2002–2013); Chairman, Episcopal Commission on Health Care (2015-2017); Chairman, Episcopal Commission on Church Cultural Heritage (2017-present)

Orders
- Ordination: October 24, 1980 by Epifanio Surban y Belmonte
- Consecration: January 8, 2002 by Ricardo Vidal

Personal details
- Born: July 4, 1956 (age 70) Parañaque, Manila, Philippines
- Denomination: Roman Catholic
- Residence: Dumaguete
- Education: Saint Joseph Seminary; San Carlos Seminary College; University of Santo Tomas; Pontifical University of Saint Thomas Aquinas
- Motto: Duce me, Domine. (Psalm 5:8) (English: Lead me, Lord.)
- Coat of arms: Julito B. Cortes's coat of arms

Styles of Julito Cortes
- Reference style: The Most Reverend
- Spoken style: Your Excellency
- Religious style: Monsignor

Julito Buhisan Cortes (born July 4, 1956) is a prelate of the Catholic Church in the Philippines. He is the current Bishop of Dumaguete in Negros Oriental, Philippines since September 2013. Before his appointment to the See of Dumaguete, Cortes was the Auxiliary Bishop of Cebu from 2002 to 2013.

== Early life ==
Although born in Parañaque, Manila on July 4, 1956, Julito Buhisan Cortes is a native of Siquijor, Siquijor. Born to Geronimo and Carmen Cortes, he is the eldest of seven children.

=== Education ===
He finished his elementary studies at Pulangyuta Elementary School (1968) in Siquijor and his high school studies at Saint Joseph Seminary (1972) in Dumaguete. He obtained his Bachelor of Arts in Philosophy degree from San Carlos Seminary College (1976) in Cebu and his Bachelor's degree in Theology at the University of Santo Tomas (1976) in Manila.

== Priesthood ==
He was ordained to the priesthood on October 24, 1980, at the Cathedral of Saint Catherine of Alexandria, Dumaguete, and was assigned by Epifanio Surban, first Bishop of Dumaguete, to Saint Joseph Seminary as teacher, formator, principal, and academic dean at a time when the seminary was transitioning from a high school seminary to the college seminary that it is now.

=== Further Education and Higher Studies ===
During summers, Cortes continued his studies at the University of Santo Tomas and finished his Licentiate in Sacred Theology (1983) and Master of Arts in Higher Religious Education (1983). After several years in seminary formation work, he proceeded with advanced studies at the Angelicum University in Rome where he obtained a Doctorate in Sacred Theology (1986). This period of academic studies also enabled him to attend international courses such as “Fostering Human Religious Development” at the Gregorian University in Rome (1986) and “Bible and the Holy Land” at Saint George's College in Jerusalem, Israel (1988). Years later, he also attended a course on “Leadership in a Participatory Church” at the East Asian Pastoral Institute, Quezon City (1996).

=== Presbyteral Ministry ===
Upon his return to the diocese, he was assigned by Angel Lagdameo, second Bishop of Dumaguete, as rector of Saint Joseph Seminary and later appointed him Vicar General as well (1989). He also became parish priest of the Heritage town of Bacong (1997). When Lagdameo convoked the first Diocesan Synod of Dumaguete (1992), he entrusted the task of presiding officer to Cortes. These administrative functions in the diocese gave Cortes an invaluable opportunity to be delegate to two historic ecclesial events in the Philippine Church, the Second Plenary Council of the Philippines (1991) and the National Pastoral Consultation on Church Renewal (2001). When Lagdameo was promoted as Archbishop of Jaro (2000), Cortes became the diocesan administrator of Dumaguete until the arrival of the third Bishop of Dumaguete, John Du (2001). A few months later, Pope John Paul II appointed Cortes as Auxiliary Bishop of Cebu and Titular Bishop of Severiana. His episcopal ordination was held at the Dumaguete Cathedral on January 8, 2002.

== Episcopacy ==
=== Auxiliary Bishop ===
Cortes served as Auxiliary Bishop of Cebu as well as parish priest of Santo Rosario Parish from January 2002 until November 2013, for almost twelve years, allowing him vast pastoral experiences and opportunities under the tutelage of two Archbishops of Cebu, Cardinal Ricardo J. Vidal and his successor Jose S. Palma. Aside from responsibilities in the Archdiocese of Cebu, Cortes also served as chairman of CBCP Permanent Committee for the Cultural Heritage of the Church from 2007 to 2013, as well as being a member of two other Commissions (Culture and Liturgy).

=== Bishop of Dumaguete ===
On September 28, 2013, Feast of San Lorenzo Ruiz, Pope Francis, appointed Cortes as the fourth Bishop of the Diocese of Dumaguete. His canonical installation and possession of the See of Dumaguete was on December 5, 2013, at the Cathedral of St. Catherine of Alexandria, Dumaguete.

In March 2024, Cortes publicly criticized the proposed recreation of the Negros Island Region to be composed of Negros Oriental, Negros Occidental and Siquijor in an open letter to President Bongbong Marcos that was also signed by eight other senior clergy in the diocese, calling it an "insult" to the people of Negros Oriental and adding that residents of the province as well as Siquijor were not consulted on the matter.
