= List of Missionary Oblates of Mary Immaculate =

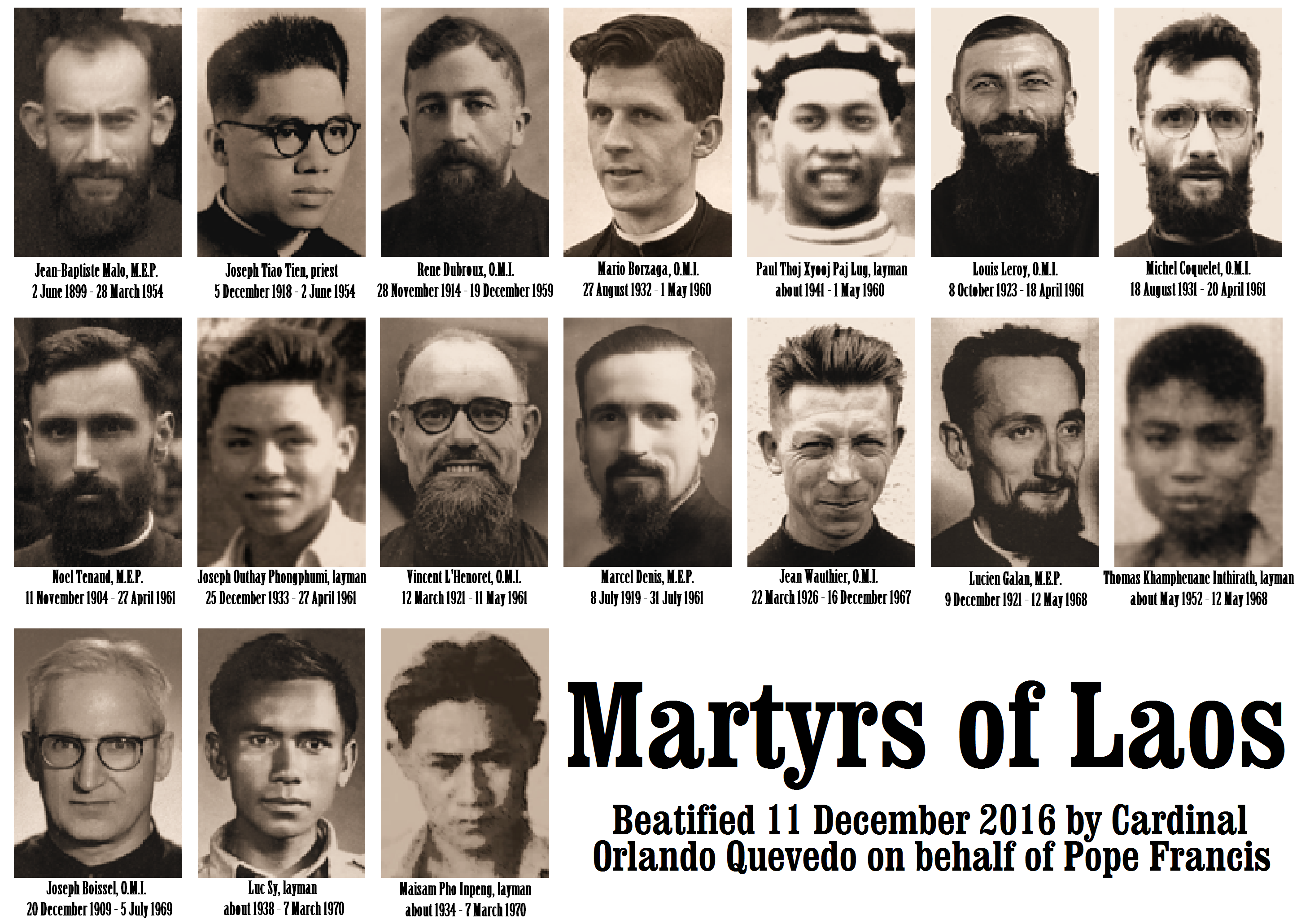
The Martyrs of Laos, a group of Missionary Oblates killed in Laos who are candidates for sainthood

The Missionary Oblates of Mary Immaculate (OMI) is a missionary religious congregation in the Catholic Church. The following is a list of notable members of the congregation.

== Superiors General ==
Superiors General were elected for life until 1972, and are currently elected in 6 year terms.

1. 1816–1861 (died): Eugène de Mazenod (1782–1861), France. Founder, first Superior General, and Saint
2. 1861–1892 (died): Joseph Fabre (1824–1892), France
3. 1893–1897 (died): Louis Soullier (1826–1897), France
4. 1898–1906 (resigned): Cassien Augier (1846–1927), France
5. 1908–1931 (died): Augustin Dontenwill (1857–1931), Canada
6. 1932–1944 (died): Théodore Labouré (1883–1944), France
7. 1947–1972 (resigned): Léo Deschâtelets (1899–1974), Canada
8. 1972–1974 (resigned): Richard Hanley (1931–?), USA
9. 1974–1986 (resigned): Fernand Jetté (1921–2000), Canada
10. 1986–1998 (resigned): Marcello Zago (1932–2001), Italy
11. 1998–2010 (resigned): Heinz Wilhelm Steckling (born 1947), Germany
12. 2010–2022: Louis Lougen (born 1952), USA
13. 2022–present: Luis Ignacio Rois Alonso (born 1963), Spain

== Candidates for sainthood ==
=== Beatified ===
- Joseph Gérard (1831–1914), French missionary priest, called the "Apostle of the Basuthos," beatified in 1988
- Józef Cebula (1902–1941), Polish priest killed by the Nazis at Mauthausen concentration camp, beatified in 1999
- Blessed Oblate Martyrs of Spain, 22 Oblate companions executed in 1936 during the Spanish Civil War, beatified in 2011
- The Martyrs of Laos, one Italian and five French missionary priests, beatified in 2016

=== Venerable ===
- Vital-Justin Grandin (1829–1902), Bishop of St. Albert, Canada. Declared venerable in 1966
- Charles Dominique Albini (1790–1839), the "Apostle of Corsica". Declared venerable in 1968
- Antoine Kowalczyk (1866–1947). The first Polish Oblate to live and work in Canada. Declared venerable in 2013
- Ovide Charlebois (1862–1933), Apostolic Vicar of Keewatin, Canada. Declared venerable in 2019

=== Servant of God ===
- Victor Lelièvre (1876–1956), Quebec City. Quebec. Declared a Servant of God in 2006
- Bastiampillai Anthonipillai Thomas, founder of the Rosarians Order. Declared a Servant of God in 2006

== Cardinals ==
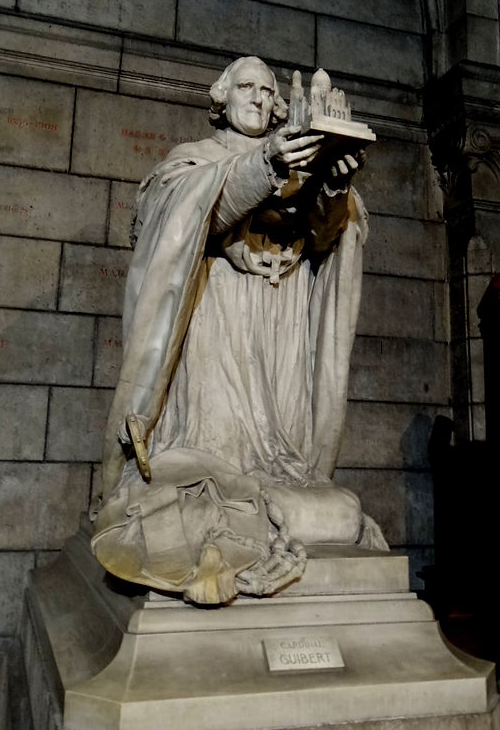
Cardinal Guibert, co-founder of Sacré-Cœur, Paris

- Joseph-Hippolyte Guibert (1802–1886), Archbishop of Paris, France
- Jean-Marie-Rodrigue Villeneuve (1883–1947), Archbishop of Quebec, Canada
- Thomas Cooray (1901–1988), Archbishop of Colombo, Sri Lanka
- Sebastian Koto Khoarai (1929–2021), Archbishop of Mohale's Hoek, Lesotho
- Francis George (1937–2015), Archbishop of Chicago, USA
- Orlando Quevedo (born 1939), Archbishop of Cotabato, Philippines

== Archbishops ==
- Alexandre-Antonin Taché (23 July 1823 – 22 June 1894), Archbishop of Saint Boniface, Canada
- Augustin Dontenwill (June 4, 1857 – November 30, 1931), Archbishop of Vancouver, Canada
- Denis Hurley (1915–2004), Archbishop of Durban, South Africa
- Adam Exner (born 1928), Archbishop of Vancouver (1991–2004), Canada
- Hubert Constant (1931–2011), Archbishop of Cap-Haïtien, Haiti
- Peter Alfred Sutton (1934–2015), Archbishop of Keewatin-Le Pas, Canada
- Roger Schweitz (born 1940), Archbishop of Anchorage, USA
- Jabulani Adatus Nxumalo (born 1944), Archbishop of Bloemfontein, South Africa
- Sylvain Lavoie (born 1947), Metropolitan Archbishop of Keewatin-Le Pas, Canada
- Buti Joseph Tlhagale (born 1947), Archbishop of Johannesburg, South Africa
- Angelito Lampon, (born 1950), Metropolitan Archbishop of Cotabato, Philippines
- Gerard Tlali Lerotholi (born 1954), Archbishop of Maseru, Lesotho
- Liborius Ndumbukuti Nashenda (born 1959), Archbishop of Windhoek, Namibia
- Bejoy Nicephorus D'Cruze (born 1956), Archbishop of Dhaka & President of Catholic Bishops Conference of Bangladesh, Bangladesh
- Charlie Malapitan Inzon (born 1965), Metropolitan Archbishop of Cotabato, Philippines

== Bishops ==
- Pierre-Paul Durieu (1830–1899), first Bishop of New Westminster (Vancouver) (1890–1899), Canada. Ordained by Eugène de Mazenod.
- Edmund Peiris (1897–1989), Bishop of Chilaw, Sri Lanka
- Albert Sanschagrin (1911–2009), Bishop of Saint-Hyacinthe, Canada
- Hubert O'Connor (1928–2007), Bishop of Prince George, Canada
- Erwin Hecht (1933–2016), Bishop of Kimberley, South Africa
- Michael David Pfeifer (born 1937), Bishop of San Angelo, United States of America
- David Douglas Crosby (born 1949), Bishop of Hamilton, Canada
- Sylvester Anthony John David (born 1953), Auxiliary Bishop of Cape Town, South Africa
- Mark Stuart Edwards (born 1959), Bishop of Wagga Wagga, Australia
- Carlos Alberto Salcedo Ojeda (born 1960), Auxiliary Bishop of Huancayo, Peru
- Pierre-Olivier Tremblay (born 1970), Auxiliary Bishop of Trois-Rivières, Canada

== Vicars ==
- Louis-Joseph d'Herbomez (1822–1890), Vicar Apostolic of British Columbia (1822–1890), Canada
- Benjamin de Jesus (1940–1997), Vicar Apostolic of Jolo, Philippines
- Victor Gnanapragasam (1940–2020), Vicar Apostolic of Quetta, Pakistan
- Jean Khamsé Vithavong (born 1942), Vicar Apostolic of Vientiane, Laos

== Priests and religious ==
- Pierre Yves Kéralum (1817–1872), missionary priest and architect
- Carl Kabat (1933–2022), American priest and peace activist
- Albert Lacombe (1827–1916), French-Canadian missionary during the formation of Canada, broker of peace between the Cree and Blackfoot tribes
- Lucien-Antoine Lagier (1814–1874), Canadian priest.
- Adrien-Gabriel Morice (1859–1938), linguist, cartographer, and ethnologist
- Émile Petitot (1838–1916), French cartographer and ethnologist
- Alexis Joveneau (1926–1992), Belgian missionary priest, participant in five National Film Board of Canada documentaries on the Innu, accused of abuse of Innu congregants during his tenure in Northern Quebec.
- Guy Mary-Rousselière (1913–1994) French-Canadian missionary priest, anthropologist and photographer, whose career was spent mostly in the Canadian Arctic.
- Ronald Rolheiser (born 1947), Canadian-born author of several spiritual books
- Larry Rosebaugh (1935–2009), American priest and activist
- Constantine Scollen (1841–1902), Irish-born missionary priest among the Blackfoot, Cree and Métis peoples of Canada and US.
