= List of mines in the Philippines =

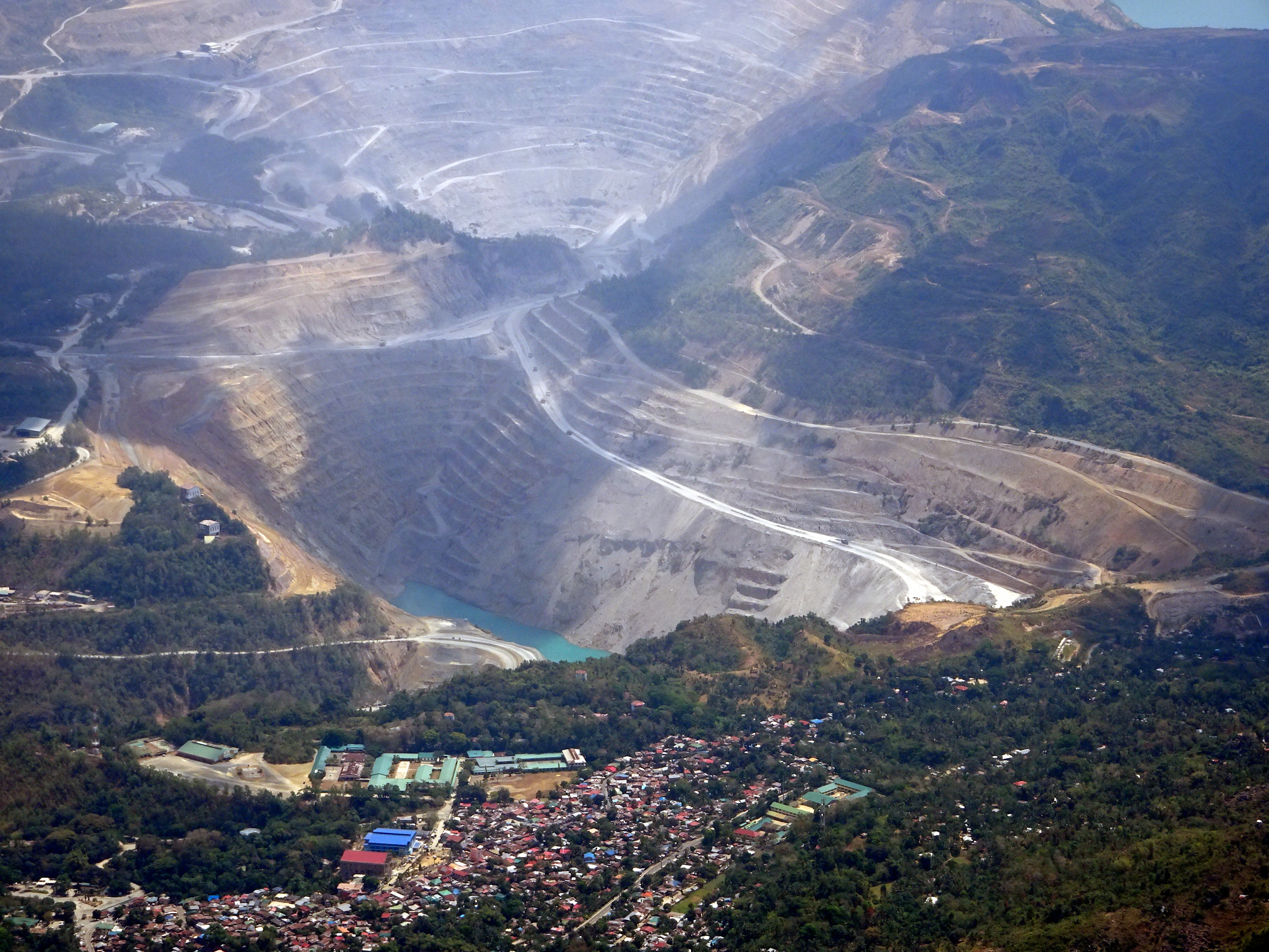
Open pit mine in Toledo, Cebu

The following list of mines in the Philippines is subsidiary to the Lists of mines in Asia article and Lists of mines articles. This list contains working, defunct and future mines in the country and is organized by the primary mineral output(s) and province. For practical purposes stone, marble and other quarries may be included in this list. Operational mines are demarcated by bold typeface, future mines are demarcated in italics.

== Coal ==
- Malangas Coal Reservation - Malangas, Zamboanga Sibugay
- Panian Open Pit Mine - Semirara Island, Caluya, Antique

== Copper ==
- Boyongan mine
- Canatuan mine
- Carmen Mine
- Didipio mine
- Tampakan mine
- Philex Mines

== Gold ==
- Balabag mine
- Canatuan mine
- Didipio mine
- Philsaga mine
- Siana mine

== Nickel ==
- ADNAMA Mining Resources Corporation
- Agata Mining Ventures, Inc. (AMVI)
- AAM-Phil Natural Resources Exploration &Devt. Corp.
- BenguetCorp Nickel Mines Incorporated
- Berong Nickel Corporation
- Cagdianao Mining Corporation (CMC)
- Carrascal Nickel Corporation (CNC)
- Century Peak Corporation (CPC)
- Claver Mineral Development Corporation
- CTP Construction and Mining Corporation
- Eramen Minerals Incorporated
- Hinatuan Mining Corporation (HMC)
- Libjo Mining Corporation (LMC)
- LNL Archipelago Minerals Incorporated
- Macventures Mining and Development Corporation (MMDC)
- Pax Libera Mining Inc. (PLMI)
- Platinum Group Metals Corporation (PGMC)
- Rio Tuba mine
- San Roque Metals Incorporated (SRMI
- Taganito Mining Corporation (TMC)
- Taganito Mining Corporation (TMC)
- VTP Mining and Construction Inc.
- Zambales Diversified Metals Corporation
