= List of Filipino cardinals =

The Philippines has produced ten cardinals.

The population of Catholics in the Philippines constitutes the country's largest religious denomination, as well as one of the largest Catholic populations among countries of the world. The Catholic faith was introduced to the Philippines by Spanish colonists in the sixteenth century. Some 400 years later, in 1960, Rufino J. Santos, the Archbishop of Manila, became the first Filipino cardinal. Since then, a total of ten Filipinos have been raised to the rank of cardinal.

On May 1, 2020, Luis Antonio G. Tagle, Pro-Prefect for the Section of First Evangelization of the Dicastery for Evangelization, was promoted to the rank of cardinal-bishop. He is the first Filipino to hold the highest rank of a cardinal in the Catholic Church. On October 8, 2026, he was designated as Dean of the College of Cardinals, the first Filipino to hold the position.

On October 6, 2024, Pope Francis named Pablo Virgilio David, Bishop of Kalookan, as the tenth Filipino Cardinal. He was elevated to the College of Cardinals in a consistory on December 8, 2024. He is the first Filipino cardinal who is not a metropolitan archbishop at the time of the announcement.

There are currently five living Filipino Cardinals, three of whom are electors: Luis Antonio Tagle, the Dean of the College of Cardinals and Pro-Prefect of the Dicastery for Evangelization; Jose Advincula, current Archbishop of Manila; and Pablo Virgilio David, current Bishop of Kalookan. They participated in the 2025 papal conclave that elected Pope Leo XIV, marking the first time in history that three Filipino cardinal-electors participated in a papal conclave. There are two other living Cardinals over the age of 80: Gaudencio Rosales, Archbishop-Emeritus of Manila; and Orlando Quevedo, Archbishop-Emeritus of Cotabato.

== List of Filipino cardinals ==
No.	Cardinal	Episcopal see / Dicastery	Consistory / Created Cardinal	Titular designation	Conclaves participated	Coat of arms
1	Rufino Jiao Santos	Manila	March 31, 1960 by St. John XXIII	Cardinal-Priest of S. Maria ai Monti	1963	
2	Julio Ras Rosales	Cebu	April 28, 1969 by St. Paul VI	Cardinal-Priest of Sacro Cuore di Gesù agonizzante a Vitinia	August 1978; October 1978	
3	Jaime Lachica Sin	Manila	May 24, 1976 by St. Paul VI	Cardinal-Priest of S. Maria ai Monti	August 1978; October 1978	
4	Ricardo Jamin Vidal	Cebu	May 25, 1985 by St. John Paul II	Cardinal-Priest of Ss. Pietro e Paolo a Via Ostiense	2005	
5	José Tomás Sánchez	Prefect of the Congregation for the Clergy	Created as Cardinal-Deacon on June 6, 1991 by St. John Paul II Elevated as Cardinal-Priest on February 26, 2002 by St. John Paul II	Cardinal-Deacon of S. Pio V a Villa Carpegna (1991–2002) Cardinal-Priest of S. Pio V a Villa Carpegna (pro hac vice) (2002–2012)	(Note: Did not participate in any conclave during his cardinalate)	
6	Gaudencio Borbon Rosales	Manila	March 24, 2006 by Benedict XVI	Cardinal-Priest of Santissimo Nome di Maria in Via Latina	(Note: Did not participate in any conclave during his cardinalate)	
7	Luis Antonio Gokim Tagle	Manila (2012–2020) Prefect of the Congregation for the Evangelization of Peoples (2019–2022) Pro-Prefect for the Section of First Evangelization of the Dicastery for Evangelization (2022–present) Dean of the College of Cardinals (2026–present)	November 24, 2012 by Benedict XVI Elevated as Cardinal-Bishop on May 1, 2020 by Francis	Cardinal-Priest of San Felice da Cantalice a Centocelle (2012–2020) Cardinal-Bishop of San Felice da Cantalice a Centocelle (pro hac vice) (2020–2025) Cardinal-Bishop of Albano (since 2025) Cardinal-Bishop of Ostia (since 2026)	2013; 2025	
8	Orlando Beltran Quevedo	Cotabato	February 22, 2014 by Francis	Cardinal-Priest of Santa Maria Regina Mundi a Torre Spaccata		
9.	Jose Fuerte Advincula	Capiz (2020–2021) Manila (2021–present)	November 28, 2020 by Francis	Cardinal-Priest of San Vigilio	2025	
10.	Pablo Virgilio Siongco David	Kalookan	December 7, 2024 by Francis	Cardinal-Priest of Trasfigurazione di Nostro Signore Gesù Cristo	2025	

== List by age ==
No.	Cardinal	Date of Birth	Date of Death	Age
1	Gaudencio Borbon Rosales	August 10, 1932; Batangas City		94 years, 104 days
2	José Tomás Sánchez	March 17, 1920; Pandan, Catanduanes	March 9, 2012; Manila	91 years, 359 days
3	Orlando Beltran Quevedo	March 11, 1939; Laoag City		87 years, 256 days
4	Ricardo Jamin Vidal	February 6, 1931; Mogpog, Marinduque	October 18, 2017; Cebu	86 years, 254 days
5	Jaime Lachica Sin	August 31, 1928; New Washington, Aklan	June 21, 2005; San Juan City	76 years, 294 days
6	Julio Rosales y Ras	September 18, 1906; Calbayog, Samar	June 2, 1983; Cebu	76 years, 257 days
7	Jose Fuerte Advincula	March 30, 1952; Dumalag, Capiz		74 years, 237 days
8	Luis Antonio Gokim Tagle	June 21, 1957; Manila		69 years, 154 days
9	Pablo Virgilio Siongco David	March 2, 1959; Betis, Guagua, Pampanga		67 years, 265 days
10	Rufino Jiao Santos	August 26, 1908; Guagua, Pampanga	September 3, 1973; Manila	65 years, 8 days

== Timeline of living cardinals ==
From	To	Number of living cardinals		
From	To	-	Total	Change
March 28, 1960 (Rufino J. Santos elevated to cardinal)	April 28, 1969 (Julio Rosales elevated to cardinal)	1 cardinal (Cardinal Santos)	1	▲1
April 28, 1969 (Julio Rosales elevated to Cardinal)	September 3, 1973 (Death of Cardinal Santos)	2 cardinals (Cardinal Santos & Cardinal J. Rosales)	2	▲1
September 3, 1973 (Death of Cardinal Santos)	May 24, 1976 (Jaime Sin elevated to Cardinal)	1 cardinal (Cardinal J. Rosales)	1	▼1
May 24, 1976 (Jaime Sin elevated to Cardinal)	June 2, 1983 (Death of Cardinal J. Rosales)	2 cardinals (Cardinal J. Rosales & Cardinal Sin)	2	▲1
June 2, 1983 (Death of Cardinal J. Rosales)	May 25, 1985 (Ricardo Vidal elevated to Cardinal)	1 cardinal (Cardinal Sin)	1	▼1
May 25, 1985 (Ricardo Vidal elevated to Cardinal)	June 28, 1991 (Jose Sanchez elevated to Cardinal)	2 cardinals (Cardinal Sin & Cardinal Vidal)	2	▲1
June 28, 1991 (Jose Tomas Sanchez elevated to Cardinal)	June 21, 2005 (Death of Cardinal Sin)	3 cardinals (Cardinals Sin, Vidal & Sanchez)	3	▲1
June 21, 2005 (Death of Cardinal Sin)	March 24, 2006 (Gaudencio Rosales elevated to Cardinal)	2 cardinals (Cardinals Vidal & Sanchez)	2	▼1
March 24, 2006 (Gaudencio Rosales elevated to Cardinal)	March 9, 2012 (Death of Cardinal Sanchez)	3 cardinals (Cardinals Vidal, Sanchez & G. Rosales)	3	▲1
March 9, 2012 (Death of Cardinal Sanchez)	November 24, 2012 (Luis Antonio Tagle elevated to Cardinal)	2 cardinals (Cardinals Vidal & G. Rosales)	2	▼1
November 24, 2012 (Luis Antonio Tagle elevated to Cardinal)	February 22, 2014 (Orlando Quevedo elevated to Cardinal)	3 cardinals (Cardinals Vidal, G. Rosales & Tagle)	3	▲1
February 22, 2014 (Orlando Quevedo elevated to Cardinal)	October 18, 2017 (Death of Cardinal Vidal)	4 cardinals (Cardinals Vidal, G. Rosales, Tagle & Quevedo)	4	▲1
October 18, 2017 (Death of Cardinal Vidal)	November 28, 2020 (Jose Advincula elevated to Cardinal)	3 cardinals (Cardinals G. Rosales, Tagle & Quevedo)	3	▼1
November 28, 2020 (Jose Advincula elevated to Cardinal)	December 7, 2024 (Pablo Virgilio David elevated to Cardinal)	4 cardinals (Cardinals G. Rosales, Tagle, Quevedo & Advincula)	4	▲1
December 7, 2024 (Pablo Virgilio David elevated to Cardinal)	Present	5 cardinals (Cardinals G. Rosales, Tagle, Quevedo, Advincula, David)	5	▲1

== Participation of Filipino Cardinals per Conclave ==
As of May 2025, seven out of ten Filipino Cardinals have participated in a conclave to elect a Pope.

Filipino Cardinal Electors per Conclave since 1963
Conclave	Previous Pope	Elected Pope	Participating Cardinals	Number of Cardinals	Ref.
1963 conclave	John XXIII	Paul VI	Rufino Santos	1	
August 1978 conclave	Paul VI	John Paul I	Julio Rosales Jaime Sin	2	
October 1978 conclave	John Paul I	John Paul II	Julio Rosales Jaime Sin	2	
2005 conclave (Note: Jaime Sin was eligible to be a cardinal-elector in the 2005 conclave, but did not participate due to health reasons. He died on June 21, 2005, two months after the conclave.)	John Paul II	Benedict XVI	Ricardo Vidal (Note: Vidal turned 80 on February 6, 2011, making him ineligible to participate in the 2013 conclave that elected Pope Francis.)	1	
2013 conclave	Benedict XVI	Francis	Luis Antonio Tagle	1	
2025 conclave	Francis	Leo XIV	Luis Antonio Tagle Jose Advincula Pablo Virgilio David	3	

Three Filipino Cardinals never participated in a conclave, as they were 80 years old before an eventual sede vacante.

- Jose Tomas Sanchez, who was made cardinal in 1991, turned 80 on March 17, 2000, preventing him from participating in the 2005 conclave. He died in 2012.
- Gaudencio Rosales, who was made cardinal in 2006, turned 80 on August 10, 2012, six months before the Resignation of Pope Benedict XVI, preventing him from participating in the conclaves 2013 and 2025.
- Orlando Quevedo, who was made cardinal in 2014, turned 80 on March 11, 2019, preventing him from participating in the 2025 conclave.

With the election and confirmation of Luis Antonio Tagle as Dean of the College of Cardinals on 9 October 2026, he is the senior cardinal-bishop and is expected to preside over an eventual conclave that may take place before his 80th birthday in 2037.

== See also ==
- List of Roman Catholic dioceses in the Philippines
- Catholic Church hierarchy
- Catholic Church in the Philippines
