= Romulo T. de la Cruz =

Filipino archbishop (1947–2021)

The Most Reverend Romulo Tolentino de la Cruz
- Archbishop of Zamboanga
- See: Zamboanga
- Installed: March 15, 2014
- Term ended: December 10, 2021
- Predecessor: Romulo Valles
- Successor: Julius Tonel
- Previous post: Bishop of Kidapawan

Orders
- Ordination: December 8, 1972
- Consecration: March 16, 1988

Personal details
- Born: June 24, 1947 Balasan, Philippines
- Died: December 10, 2021 (aged 74) Zamboanga City, Philippines
- Denomination: Roman Catholic
- Coat of arms

Romulo Tolentino de la Cruz (June 24, 1947 – December 10, 2021), was a prelate of the Roman Catholic Church in the Philippines. He was the Roman Catholic Archbishop of Zamboanga in the Philippines.

Styles of Romulo Tolentino de la Cruz
- Reference style: The Most Reverend
- Spoken style: Your Excellency
- Religious style: Archbishop
- Posthumous style: not applicable

== Life and ministry ==
Romulo T. de la Cruz was born on June 24, 1947 in Balasan, Iloilo, being the eighth of ten children of Vicente Dela Cruz and Lucia Tolentino. Romulo was ordained to the priesthood on December 8, 1972, after having completed his seminary studies in Notre Dame Seminary (Nuling, Sultan Kudarat, 1964) and the Saint Francis Xavier Regional Major Seminary – REMASE (Davao City, 1969), respectively.

As a priest of the Diocese of Kidapawan, Father Dela Cruz was designated several times as a formator of the Notre Dame Seminary and as the Parish Priest of Nuestra Señora de la Candelaria Parish in Tacurong, Sultan Kudarat (1985-1987). He also completed his Graduate Studies in Theology at REMASE (1973) and with his Special Studies at the Institute on Religious Formation (IRF) in St. Louis, Missouri, USA (1982).

On December 17, 1988, Pope John Paul II appointed Father Romulo Dela Cruz as Coadjutor Bishop of the Prelature of Isabela de Basilan. The following year he was ordained to the episcopacy on March 16, 1988, with the then Apostolic Nuncio to the Philippines, Archbishop Bruno Torpigliani, as the principal consecrator, and assisted by Archbishop Philip Francis Smith, OMI (Cotabato) and Bishop-Emeritus José María Querejeta Mendizábal, CMF (Isabela de Basilan) as co-consecrators. Bishop Dela Cruz was appointed Coadjutor of San Jose de Antique on Jan. 8, 2001 and installed on April 3, 2001. He then became Bishop of San Jose de Antique (as its third bishop) on March 16, 2002, as the successor to Bishop Raul José Quimpo Martirez. Pope Benedict XVI appointed him Bishop of Kidapawan, Cotabato, (as its fifth bishop) on May 14, 2008.

On March 15, 2014, Pope Francis appointed Bishop Dela Cruz as the Metropolitan Archbishop of Zamboanga, taking over his predecessor Archbishop Romulo Valles who was appointed to the See of Davao in 2011; he is the sixth to take office as the Metropolitan Ordinary of Zamboanga since Archbishop Del Rosario in 1958. He was installed into office on May 14, 2014 by Archbishop Giuseppe Pinto, the then Apostolic Nuncio to the Philippines. Archbishop Dela Cruz was a member of the Episcopal Commission on Social Communications and Mass Media and Vice Chairman of the Episcopal Office on Women of the Catholic Bishops’ Conference of the Philippines (CBCP).

Archbishop Romulo De la Cruz died on December 10, 2021, at the age of 74, two days after celebrating the forty-ninth year of his priestly ordination.

Catholic Church titles
Preceded by Romulo Valles	Bishop of Kidapawan; 2006–2014	Succeeded by Jose Colin Bagaforo
Preceded by Romulo Valles	Archbishop of Zamboanga; 2014–2021	Vacant
