= Cerilo Casicas =

Filipino Catholic bishop (born 1967)

His Excellency, The Most Reverend Cerilo Casicas D.D.
- Bishop of Marbel
- Province: Cotabato
- See: Marbel
- Appointed: April 28, 2018
- Installed: July 11, 2018
- Predecessor: Dinualdo Gutierrez

Orders
- Ordination: October 27, 1994
- Consecration: July 11, 2018 by Orlando Quevedo

Personal details
- Born: Cerilo Uy Casicas; March 18, 1967 (age 59) Duero, Bohol, Philippines
- Denomination: Roman Catholic
- Motto: Formam Servi Accipiens "Taking the form of a servant"
- Coat of arms

Styles of Cerilo Casicas
- Reference style: His Excellency; The Most Reverend
- Spoken style: Your Excellency
- Religious style: Bishop

Cerilo Uy Casicas (born March 18, 1967) is a Filipino prelate of the Roman Catholic Church who currently serves as Bishop of Marbel since 2018.

== Early life and education ==
Casicas was born on March 18, 1967, in Duero, Bohol, Philippines. He pursued his seminary formation at Our Lady of Perpetual Help Seminary in Koronadal, South Cotabato, where he completed his philosophy studies. He later enrolled at St. Francis Xavier Regional Major Seminary of Mindanao in Davao, and he earned his theology degree at Loyola School Theology, Quezon City. He completed his priestly formation at San Jose Seminary, Quezon City in 1994

Continuing his academic journey, he obtained a Licentiate in Dogmatic Theology from the Pontifical Gregorian University in Rome in 2003. In 2004, he attended the Language Institute Kreuzberg in Bonn, Germany, for further studies in German.

== Priesthood ==
Casicas was ordained as a priest on October 27, 1994, for the Diocese of Marbel. His early assignments included serving at the Chancery Office of the Diocese from 1994 to 1995. He was later appointed dean of studies at Our Lady of Perpetual Help Seminary in Koronadal, a role he held from 1995 to 2000.

While studying in Rome, he served as Chaplain of the Filipino community from 2001 to 2004. Upon his return to the Philippines, he became an instructor of philosophy at Notre Dame of Marbel University from 2005 to 2006. He was later assigned Parish Priest of Jesus Good Shepherd Parish in Polomolok from 2006 to 2009.

In 2010, he took a sabbatical year at the Our Lady of the Philippines Trappist Monastery in Jordan, Guimaras. He then served as Assistant Priest in several parishes in General Santos City before being appointed as Director and Professor at St. John Vianney Seminary in Cagayan de Oro City in 2013.

== Episcopal ministry ==
On April 28, 2018, Pope Francis appointed Casicas as the Bishop of Marbel, succeeding Bishop Dinualdo Gutierrez. His episcopal ordination took place on July 11, 2018, with Cardinal Orlando Quevedo as the principal consecrator. The formal installation ceremony followed at the Christ the King Cathedral in Koronadal City on the same day.

As bishop, Casicas has been vocal about environmental protection and social justice issues. He strongly opposes large-scale mining operations, particularly the Tampakan copper-gold project, warning of its potential to cause severe environmental damage and displace indigenous communities.

Catholic Church titles
Preceded by Dinualdo Gutierrez	Bishop of Marbel; July 11, 2018 – present	Incumbent
