= Diocese of Marbel =

Latin Catholic diocese in the Philippines

Diocese of Marbel Dioecesis Marbeliana Diyosesis sang Marbel Diyosesis sa Marbel Diyosesis ng Marbel

Catholic
- Koronadal Cathedral

- Coat of arms

Location
- Country: Philippines
- Territory: South Cotabato (including General Santos; Sarangani; Sultan Kudarat ( only Milbuk, Palimbang)
- Ecclesiastical province: Cotabato
- Coordinates: 6°29′53″N 124°50′32″E

Statistics
- Area: 10,000 km^{2} (3,900 sq mi)
- Population: Total; Catholics: (as of 2021); 2,112,000; 1,671,000 (79.1%)
- Parishes: 31

Information
- Denomination: Catholic Church
- Sui iuris church: Latin Church
- Rite: Roman Rite
- Cathedral: Cathedral of Christ the King
- Titular patron: Christ the King
- Secular priests: 55

Current leadership
- Pope: Leo XIV
- Bishop: Cerilo U. Casicas, D.D.
- Metropolitan Archbishop: Charlie Inzon
- Vicar General: Angelo R. Buenavides

The Diocese of Marbel (Lat: Dioecesis Marbeliana) is a Latin Church ecclesiastical jurisdiction or diocese of the Catholic Church in the Philippines.

Erected in 1960, as the territorial prelature of Marbel, the prelature was elevated in 1982 to a full diocese. The diocese is a suffragan of the Archdiocese of Cotabato and is currently headed by Bishop Cerilo Uy Casicas on April 29, 2018, by Pope Francis.

South Cotabato occupies the southern portion of what used to be the entire province of Cotabato. This resulted from a political participation of the province into two Cotabato in 1967. The territory is bounded on the east by Davao del Sur, on the west by what is now Cotabato Province and the Moro Gulf, on the north by Cotabato alone and on the south by the Celebes Sea and Sarangani Bay.

It is also where Dole Philippines has over 80 square kilometers of pineapple plantations, and a sister company is involved in the production of Cavendish bananas. The pineapple cannery alone employs thousands of workers and is a major activity of the province. The fishing industry is also extending from the surrounding waters of Sarangani Bay and the Celebes Sea.

The capital city is Koronadal, formerly known as Marbel, hence the name of the diocese. It hosts the Cathedral of Christ the King, the seat of the Bishop of Marbel.

== History ==
Marbel's journey toward the elevation of a Diocese in 1982. The area was originally administered as part of the Diocese of Manila, which was established in 1575. It was later elevated to an Archdiocese, with the creation of suffragan dioceses in 1595. Among these was the Diocese of Cebu, which existed under the Spanish colony. In the nineteenth century, a new Diocese was established when the Diocese of Jaro was created in 1865, separating it from Cebu.

Before the Diocese of Jaro was erected in 1865, the entire region of Mindanao had been designated as an Apostolic Prefecture on September 28, 1840, under the leadership of Most Rev. Bernardo M. Rabascall, O.S.M. However, he resigned in 1841 due to various challenges and circumstances that hindered the mission of spreading the faith. Additionally, in 1841, threats from the Moros led to the dissolution of the Apostolic Prefecture of Mindanao later that same year.

During the American colonialization, in 1898, after the Treaty of Paris signed which the territory of the Philippines was ceded to the United States from Spain, Pope Leo XIII issued an Apostolic Constitution of Quae Mari Sinico for the Philippines, known as the magna carta for the situation of the future development of the Catholic Church in the Philippines under the leadership of the Apostolic Delegate, Archbishop Giovanni Battista Guidi who promulgated it on December 8, 1902.

On December 8, 1907, the First Provincial Council of Manila was opened under the leadership of Apostolic Delegate, Msgr. Ambrogio Agius, OSB. The council aimed to discuss the implementation of the provisions outlined in the Apostolic Constitution Quae Mari Sinico, created by Pope Leo XIII. Among the key topics was the establishment of new ecclesiastical territories. Three years after the promulgation of the First Provincial Council in 1910, the Diocese of Zamboanga was established as one of the first dioceses in Mindanao, alongside the Dioceses of Tuguegarao, Lipa, and Calbayog, as well as the Apostolic Prefecture of Palawan.

Following the establishment of the Diocese of Zamboanga and before the arrival of General Paulino Santos and the initial settlers, the first documented group of Christian colonists arrived in Glan in 1914, with another group coming in 1915 under Tranquilino Ruiz Sr.. In 1916, a small number of Christian settlers made their home in Makar. Between 1920 and 1926, some homeseekers from the Ilocos region moved to the Kiamba area under Cristanto Hidalgo. Additionally, in 1930, a group of families from Nueva Ecija settled in Baluan, Polomolok, and Tupi.

In 1933, the northern part of Mindanao was separated from the Diocese of Zamboanga, which led to the creation of the Diocese of Cagayan De Oro and the parts of the southern part of Mindanao, which encompasses of provinces of Zamboanga, Sulu, Davao, Cotabato, and Lanao.

Bishop Luis del Rosario, SJ, the Bishop of Zamboanga, faced numerous challenges in administering the large southern region of Mindanao. During the Spanish colonial period, the Jesuits took on the responsibility for all of Mindanao, serving the needs of the community. At that time, only 25 Jesuit priests were actively working to propagate the mission and support the people in southern Mindanao.

To address the problem and its challenges, Bishop del Rosario, SJ, invited the Congregation of the Oblates of Mary Immaculate (OMI) in 1938 to undertake a mission in the communities of Cotabato and Sulu. In 1939, Fr. Hulwegg visited these areas to investigate the situation. After his visit, he returned to Rome, where he shared his findings, highlighting the need for support, which led to the decision to serve in those communities.

On February 27, 1939, the first group of pioneering settlers arrived on the shores of Dadiangas, led by General Paulino Santos, who became the Administrator of the National Land Settlement Administration. This settlement was established for migrants from Luzon and Visayas, each bringing a distinct vernacular language. The settlers built shelters and other structures for their survival, which led to the creation of the National Land Settlement Administration, approved through Commonwealth Act No. 441 by President Manuel L. Quezon in June 1939. This program was a part of social justice efforts connected to the Papal Encyclical of Pope Leo XIII, Rerum Novarum, which aimed to provide land to the landless that give the opportunity the right to access the land for the shelter and the livelihood and support agricultural development in the vast surrounding areas.

In October 1939, Oblate missionaries arrived in Cotabato and Sulu, bringing with them seven pioneers, including Fr. Gerard Mongeau, OMI, who later served as Bishop of Cotabato. Just three months later, in December 1939, Fr. James Boyd made his way to General Santos, accompanied by Prof. Mariano Raymundo. Together, they envisioned establishing the first church and a parish (simultaneously under the Diocese of Marbel) that would fall under the jurisdiction of the Diocese of Zamboanga. This vision materialized as the Sts. Peter and Paul Parish Church, situated in Barangay Lagao, City of General Santos, was erected by Bishop del Rosario, SJ of that Diocese (which fell under Zamboanga during that period) on June 29, 1941, and Fr. Frank McSorley, OMI was the First Parish Priest in Sts. Peter and Paul Parish Church.The same year in 1941 another batch of settlers arrived and the settlements in Norala and Banga are open.

Throughout the establishment of new settlements in the expansive region of Marbel, several difficulties emerged, such as the absence of electricity, the outbreak of malaria that occurred before World War II in Asia, and the even greater challenge posed by the widespread conflict of World War II beginning in 1941. Following World War II, another parish Church had been erected in Marbel (located in Koronadal City) in 1946 it was named as St. Anthony of Padua Parish (and named again Christ the King Cathedral Parish Church) and the original parish church of the Sts. Peter and Paul in Lagao was destroyed and subsequently rebuilt in 1947, and the church was relocated by purchasing an eight-hectare plot of land known as the Hippodrome from Amadeo Matute, which became the third and final location of the first parish church. In 1949, another parish Church had been erected in Glan, Sarangani.

On August 11, 1950, the Cotabato (and including the parts of the Territory under the Marbel) and Sulu was removed and separated from the Diocese of Zamboanga, and was named as Territorial Prelature of Cotabato and Sulu with Fr. Gerard Mongeau, OMI as the First Bishop and on October 28, 1953, it was changed as the Territorial Prelature of Cotabato separating the Sulu. Under Bishop Mongeau seven parish Churches had been established of the following; in Banga in 1950, Norala in 1952, Kiamba in 1954, Tupi in 1956, Dadiangas in 1957; Polomolok in 1958 and Milbuk in 1959.

Similar challenges faced in Zamboanga and Lipa had challenging by Bishop Mongeau which Marbel also had a vast large land to accommodate on continuing the mission to the Catholic faithful and to question whether to divide the territories under the prelature in Cotabato, but to resolve the challenges in 1957, Bishop Mongeau invited the religious congregation of the Passionists (CP).

In 2022, the province of South Cotabato and the Provincial Board has approve the revision of the ordinance for the Environmental Code that lifts ban the open pit mining which dismayed by the constituents that led to the solidarity walk protest led by Bishop Cerilo Casicas. But Governor Reynaldo Tamayo had been rejected and vetoed the ordinance on the lifting the ban on open pit mining

== Territories ==
The Diocese of Marbel comprises the civil provinces of South Cotabato, Sarangani and some parts of Sultan Kudarat. It has a land area of 10,000 square kilometers and a population of 1,094,770, of which 80 percent are Catholics. Marbel was made a prelature on December 17, 1960. On November 15, 1982, it was elevated into a diocese, remaining a suffragan of the Diocese of Cotabato. Its titular patron is Christ the King, whose feast is celebrated toward the end of November.

== Community ==
The Diocese of South Cotabato has 22 parishes and 2 missions attended to by 65 priests. It has 15 religious brothers and 93 religious sisters doing varied works in the community. Among its Catholic institutions are 1 university, 2 colleges, 24 high schools, 34 elementary schools and 9 kindergarten schools. It also has 2 hospitals, 3 homes for dependent children, 1 home for adults, and 8 retreat centers. The total number of BECs has now reached 1,242.

The diocesan pastoral offices include the Commissions on Christian Formation, Social Action, Worship and Liturgy. The diocesan lay associations include those of the Lay Liturgical Leaders, the Lay Liturgists, the Knights of Columbus, the Parish Pastoral Councils, the BCC/GKK Practitioners, the Kriska Alagads, the Catholic Youth Ministry, the Family and Life Ministry, and the Catechists.

== Ordinaries ==
Bishop		Period in Office	Coat of Arms	Note
1.	Charles Quentin Bertram Olwell, C.P. †	19 Jan 1961 - 18 Nov 1969		Resigned; First Passionist Bishop assigned in Marbel
2.	Reginald Edward Vincent Arliss, C.P. †	18 Nov 1969 - 1 Oct 1981		Retired
3.	Dinualdo Gutierrez †	1 Oct 1981 - 11 July 2018		Retired; First Filipino Bishop of Marbel
4.	Cerilo U. Casicas	July 11, 2018 – Present		

== See also ==
- Catholic Church in the Philippines
- Archdiocese of Cotabato
