= Diocese of Kidapawan =

Latin Catholic diocese in the Philippines

Diocese of Kidapawan Dioecesis Kidapavanensis Diyosesis ng Kidapawan Diyosesis sa Kidapawan Diyosesis sang Kidapawan

Catholic
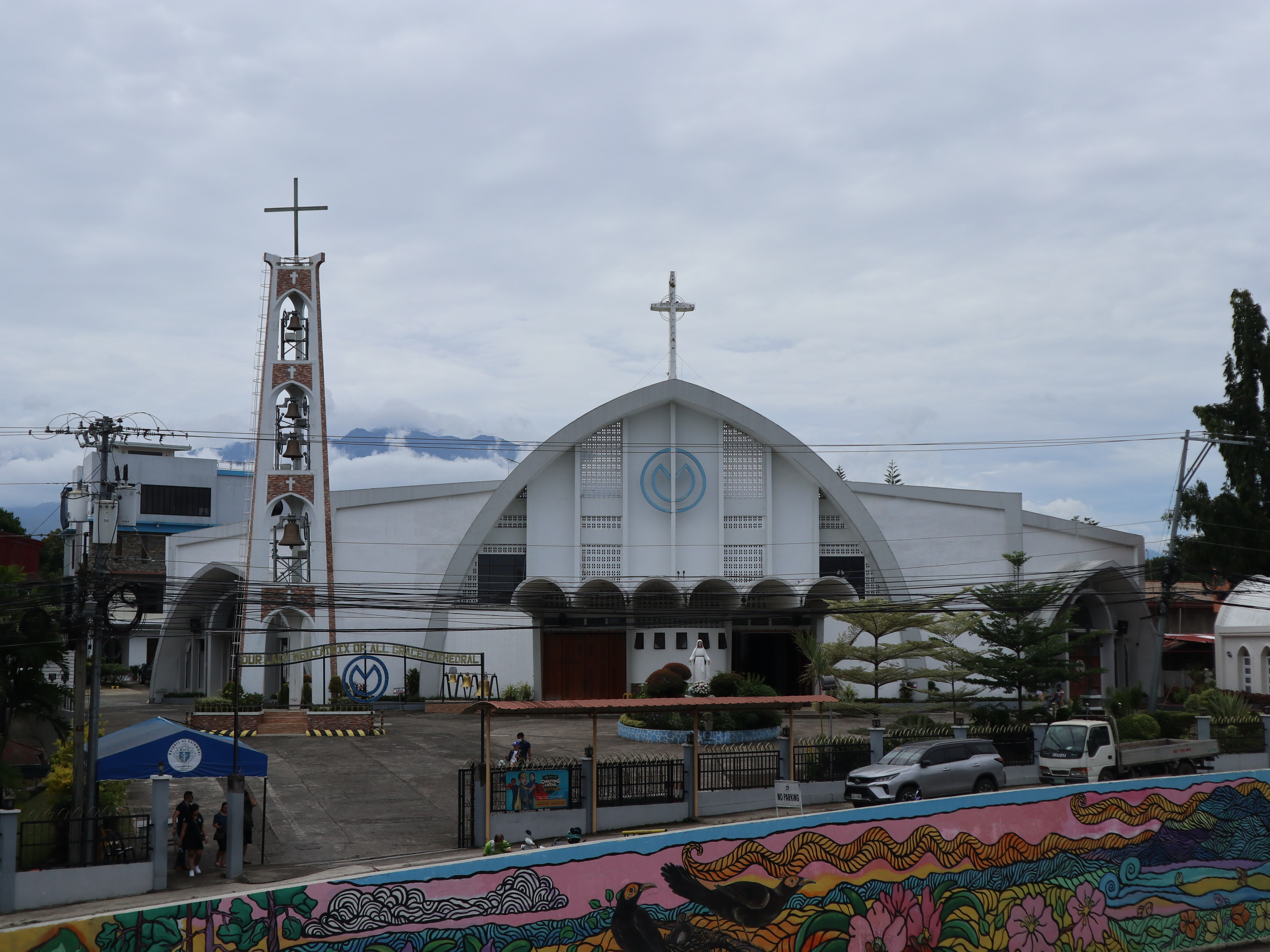
- Our Lady Mediatrix of All Grace Cathedral

- Coat of arms

Location
- Country: Philippines
- Territory: eastern Cotabato (except for Alamada, Aleosan, Banisilan, Libungan, Midsayap, Pigcawayan, Pikit); Columbio, Sultan Kudarat; 3 towns in Maguindanao
- Ecclesiastical province: Cotabato
- Metropolitan: Cotabato
- Coordinates: 7°01′03″N 125°05′33″E

Statistics
- Area: 5,199 km^{2} (2,007 sq mi)
- Population: Total; Catholics: (as of 2021); 1,056,951; 618,726 (58.5%)

Information
- Denomination: Catholic
- Sui iuris church: Latin Church
- Rite: Roman Rite
- Cathedral: Cathedral of Our Lady Mediatrix of all Grace in Kidapawan

Current leadership
- Pope: Leo XIV
- Bishop: Jose Colin M. Bagaforo
- Metropolitan Archbishop: Charlie Inzon
- Vicar General: Ronilo A. Villamor

The Diocese of Kidapawan (Lat: Dioecesis Kidapavanensis) is a Latin Catholic diocese of the Catholic Church in the Philippines. Its cathedral is in Kidapawan City.

== History ==
The origin of the Diocese of Kidapawan goes back to the first Jesuit missionaries who introduced Christianity to Mindanao in the late 17th century.

The Prelature of Kidapawan was erected on June 12, 1976. Bishop Federico O. Escaler, SJ, was elected first prelate ordinary and took over the prelature on Sept. 6, 1976. In 1980, Bishop Orlando B. Quevedo, OMI, was elected bishop-prelate, and ordained on Oct. 28, 1980 at the Cathedral of Kidapawan, North Cotabato. On Nov. 15, 1982 the Prelature of Kidapawan was elevated to a diocese. Bishop Juan de Dios Pueblos was appointed diocesan bishop on Feb. 3, 1987.

=== Mindanao conflict ===
Mindanao was generally peaceful at the time the first settlers from Visayas and Luzon arrived. Natives and Muslims were friendly to the settlers then. Forests, rivers and wild animals were as yet undisturbed. When the logging companies and the settlers later cleared many areas to open up the rice lands, a few rich settlers began the rubber plantations around Kidapawan. Then land grabbing became a big issue.

In the early 1970s, the Muslim-Christian conflict erupted. This was branded a religious conflict when in fact it was not. It was actually caused by incidents connected to land-grabbing and to unscrupulous politicians organizing armed groups. Many atrocities were committed and many communities destroyed. When martial law was declared in 1972, the National Democratic Front - NPA again made Mindanao a land of conflict.

It was against the background of conflict that the Prelature of Kidapawan was born. This was the term of Bishop Federico Escaler, and he lost no time in convening the First Prelature General Assembly of Kidapawan in 1977. This assembly articulated the prelature's thrust then as Education for Justice.

In 1980, Bishop Escaler was transferred to Ipil and Bishop Orlando Quevedo took over the prelature. This was a period of intense growth of the basic ecclesial communities (BECs) with an orientation for justice. Most lay leaders became targets and some were killed. Included in this carnage was Father Tullio Favali, PIME. Every year Favali's death anniversary is celebrated as a Day of the Martyrs in the diocese.

== Diocesan ministry ==
The Formation Programs of the diocese cover the areas of Christian formation, lay leadership, family life, youth, vocational school ministry, and mass media. Service programs focus on tribal Filipinos, justice and peace, community-based health programs and social action.

The Social Action Center of the Diocese of Kidapawan has been institutionalized under the name of GKK-Kidapawan Foundation, Inc. It is the vision of the foundation to contribute to the total development of the people in the diocese, so that they may respond to the people's socio-economic needs, based on limited resources. People's cooperatives are now being established, skills and capabilities developed.

=== Missionary efforts ===
In 1992, during the Fourth General Assembly of the Diocese of Kidapawan, the following diocesan goals and thrusts have been approved by the participants:

The building and strengthening of BEC's in the diocese;

- The increase of Christian involvement in social action;
- The improvement of witnessing and living out of the faith;
- The deepening of education;
- Support of the liberating initiatives of the indigenous people;
- The protection of the richness of nature;
- Support for women's organizations in the diocese;
- The support of lay organizations to serve the BEC's;
- The strengthening of the organization of the youth; and
- The strengthening of the campaign for native religious vocations.

== Ordinaries ==
Bishop		Period in Office	Coat of Arms	Note
1.	Federico O. Escaler, S.J.	12 Jun 1976 - 23 Feb 1980		Appointed Bishop-prelate of Ipil
2.	Orlando Beltran Quevedo, O.M.I.	23 Jul 1980 - 22 Mar 1986		Appointed Archbishop of Nueva Segovia
3.	Juan de Dios Pueblos	1987-1995		Appointed Bishop of Butuan
4.	Romulo Geolina Valles	24 Jun 1997 - 13 Nov 2006		Appointed Archbishop of Zamboanga
5.	Romulo Tolentino de la Cruz	14 May 2008 - March 15, 2014		Appointed Archbishop of Zamboanga
6.	Jose Colin Mendoza Bagaforo	25 July 2016 – present		

== See also ==
- Catholic Church in the Philippines
