= Gerry Gamaliel Delos Reyes =

Filipino bishop

His Excellency, The Most Reverend Gerry Gamaliel Delos Reyes D.D.
- Apostolic Vicar-elect of Jolo
- See: Immediately subject to the Holy See
- Appointed: November 21, 2026
- Predecessor: Charlie M. Inzon
- Successor: Incumbent

Orders
- Ordination: April 24, 1993 by Philip L. Smith, OMI

Personal details
- Born: Gerry Gamaliel Sebastian Delos Reyes; August 14, 1964 (age 62) Cotabato City
- Denomination: Roman Catholic
- Education: Loyola School of Theology

Gerry Gamaliel S. Delos Reyes, OMI (born August 14, 1962) is a Filipino Roman Catholic prelate who is currently the Apostolic vicar-elect of the Apostolic Vicariate of Jolo. He was appointed to the episcopacy by Pope Leo XIV on November 21, 2026, succeeding the then-vicar Charlie Inzon, as the sixth Apostolic vicar of Jolo.

== Early life and education ==
Delos Reyes was born on August 14, 1962, in Cotabato City. He joined the OMI's Juniorate Seminary in 1983 and then joined the Tamontaka Novitiate in Datu Odin Sinsuat in 1985.

He began his undergraduate studies at the Our Lady of Assumption Scholasticate in Quezon City, a formation school for the Missionary Oblates of Mary Immaculate and finished his undergraduate formation in Philosophy at the Notre Dame University at Cotabato in 1988. By 1989, he had already made his perpetual vows to his religious order.

== Ministry ==
=== Priesthood ===
Delos Reyes was ordained to the priesthood on August 14, 1993, and was then incardinated into the Archdiocese of Cotabato after his ordination, first serving as a parish priest in Timanan at South Upi until 1996, before becoming the parochial vicar of the Our Lady of Grace parish in Caloocan City, a position he held until 1998.

In 1988, Delos Reyes started preparing to serve as a foreign missionary and learned the Thai language from 1998 to 2000. In 1999 he joined the Missionary Oblates' Thailand Mission, where he served as a parish priest of the Saint Clement Mary Hofbauer parish of the Diocese of Udon Thani, Thailand.

By 2003, Delos Reyes became the Post-Novitiate Superior of Thailand and held multiple posts until his appointment as the Superior of the Thailand-Laos OMI delegation, a position he held from 2013 to 2019.

Delos Reyes served as the provincial superior of the Missionary Oblates in the Philippines for two consecutive terms from 2020 to October 2026.

=== Episcopate ===
Delos Reyes was appointed by Pope Leo XIV as vicar of the Apostolic Vicariate of Jolo on November 21, 2026, succeeding Bishop Charlie Inzon, who was transferred from Jolo and appointed as the Metropolitan Archbishop of Cotabato in 2025.

== See also ==
- Apostolic Vicariate of Jolo
