= 1995 Ipil massacre =

Killings and looting in the Philippines

- Part of the Moro conflict and terrorism in the Philippines
- Ipil (Philippines)
- Location: 7.782222°N 122.586667°E; IIpil, Zamboanga del Sur, Philippines
- Date: April 4, 1995; 31 years ago 12:30 p.m. (PHT, UTC+8)
- Attack type: Mass shooting; mass murder; terrorism; arson; hostage-taking
- Weapons: Automatic firearms; grenades; RPGs
- Deaths: 53 - 100
- Injuries: 48+
- Victim: 37 hostages
- Perpetrator: Abu Sayyaf
- No. of participants: 200
- Motive: Islamic extremism

The 1995 Ipil massacre occurred on the morning of April 4, 1995, in the municipality of Ipil, then in Zamboanga del Sur province of the Philippines, when approximately 200 heavily armed Abu Sayyaf militants fired upon residents, strafed civilian homes, plundered banks, took up to 30 hostages and then burned the center of the town to the ground.

The militants allegedly arrived in the town by boat and bus, and a number of them had been dressed in military fatigues.

The town's Chief of Police was reportedly killed in the attack and close to a billion pesos were looted from eight commercial banks. Army commandos pursued some rebel gunmen in nearby mountains while officials said that the rebels were looting farms and seizing civilians as "human shields" as they fled the town. About 40 rebels, who may have taken hostages, were cornered in a school compound west of Ipil on April 6 when an elite army unit attacked. In the fighting that followed, the television station GMA reported, 11 civilians were killed.

== Background ==
Muslim rebels who had been seeking a separate Islamic state on Mindanao, home to most of the Muslim minority, had been involved in a conflict for the past two decades. For instance, the Moro National Liberation Front (MNLF), the country's largest and oldest group, had waged an insurrection against the administration of Ferdinand Marcos. To end the conflict, peace talks between the national government under President Fidel Ramos and the MNLF for a limited regional autonomy was reopened in 1992; and yielded a bilateral ceasefire agreement in 1994.

However, some MNLF members still seeking separatism opted to join Abu Sayyaf Group (ASG; Bearer of the Sword)—which was implicated in the incident—a separate movement formed by Abdurajak Abubakar Janjalani in Basilan, along with some local jihadists. The group, opposing peace talks, was previously thought to be a small group from Basilan and Jolo. Military intelligence sources believed that these extremists had been operating since as early as August 1991, carrying out a series of violent activities.

Edwin Angeles, an ASG military strategist and the chief of the group's political section who defected to the government in February 1995, confirmed in April an intelligence report linking the group with the Islamic fundamentalists involved in the 1993 bombing of the World Trade Center in New York City, particularly the alleged mastermind Ramzi Yousef; as well as that on the group being supported financially by Middle Eastern sympathizers of global terrorist groups. Reportedly, ASG was among those supported by the network by Yousef, who had met several times with them. Contacts between the ASG and international terrorists had been established as early as 1991.

The municipality of Ipil (Note: The municipalities at the time of the event were part of Zamboanga del Sur until becoming part of Zamboanga Sibugay since the latter's establishment in 2001.) is predominantly Catholic, and was once a Muslim majority town prior to migration of people from other areas of the country. Despite being isolated, it was a center of trading and transportation activities in the Zamboanga peninsula area. It was the site of violence between Muslim insurgents and Christian vigilantes in 1972 in the first battle during the Moro insurgency in Mindanao.

== Events ==
=== Prior to the assault ===
Some 200 men in military fatigues and armed with rifles began to arrive at Ipil in the evening of April 3, 1995, coming on buses and a truck which were able to pass military checkpoints; some by boats. They were mistakenly identified by unsuspected residents as security forces.

At dawn of April 4, in a diversionary tactic, some of the insurgents attacked the security guards of a gold mine 25 kilometers from the municipality. Col. Roberto Santiago, commander of the Philippine Army's 102nd infantry brigade based nearby, sent 40 soldiers, almost emptying the garrison. This let the main force head towards the town proper by land transport.

=== Massacre and encounter ===
The assault began at 12:30 p.m. when an army major was shot dead in a restaurant. Gunmen, this time in ninja hoods, neckerchiefs, or headbands, fired at the police and army headquarters; also, deliberately at people manning the commercial establishments in the town proper, as well as those on streets.

Raiders looted the establishments including seven banks. They first barged into at least four or five of the banks including the commercial PCIBank, Allied Bank, and RCBC; and a department store. (Note: Ramos said in 2015 that seven banks were robbed. On the other hand, some reports, particularly by the United States Department of State, stated that four were looted.)

At 1:20 p.m., the entire town center was set on fire until being eventually destroyed; apparently to cover their withdrawal and to confuse authorities. Four responding firemen aboard a firetruck were shot, instantly killing the driver.

At 2:30 p.m., the attackers assaulted the compound of the district office of the Department of Public Works and Highways, with a gunbattle lasted for half an hour.

The carnage ended around 3 p.m. when rebels withdrew from the town. It was not until after 4 p.m., when the military first arrived at the town. Government troops, particularly the Southern Command (Southcom) based in Zamboanga City, later engaged with the suspects in a heavy fighting. The rebels retreated while leaving some dead companions; burned houses, causing residents in villages to flee; and took a number of people hostage. The raiders escaped in three main groups—two headed to a forest, reportedly on foot, with hostages westward to Sirawai, Zamboanga del Norte; another aboard a motorized boat southward, later hiding in a ranch near Zamboanga City.

Later, police found in the area a white flag marking the third anniversary of the ASG.

=== Hostage crisis ===
Rebels, upon their retreat, seized at least 26 hostages from Ipil and others as they passed through other villages, using them as human shields. The reported total number reached as high as 50; (Note: The total number of hostages varied as per sources: 30 (Manila Standard); 40 (Reuters; 1995 report by the United States Department of State); 50 (defunct Today newspaper) (This might not include the three taken in Tungawan on April 24.)) majority of them later escaped.

A day after their abduction, an Allied Bank clerk was freed, while a village chief and an official was executed. On April 7, a day after a military offensive against the rebels was launched, five were shot dead during firefights in R. T. Lim. In Tungawan, on April 14, thirteen or 14 were hacked to death on Piñas Island; one of the survivors was rescued two days later. On April 24, three residents were taken by the bandits.

By mid-year, Jocelyn Ortega, an engineer assigned at the DPWH, was the only hostage from Ipil remained in captivity. As of April 1996, she had been reportedly brought to Patikul, Sulu. She had been believed being kept for ransom.

The hostages also included nine salesladies of a department store. Meanwhile, Federico O. Escaler, at that time serving as the founding prelate of Ipil, later survived. It was the second time he was kidnapped.

== Effects ==
The attack was said the worst single act of violence in 20 years in a Muslim insurgency.

=== Casualties ===
The official death toll in the assault was 53. (Note: According to a news report by the Philippine News Agency, by end of April, the death toll was 60, while 126 were injured and three were still reported as missing.) (Note: At least a report from The Washington Post mentioned 47 residents killed.) It was reported that the dead, scattered in several areas, were mostly civilians caught in the crossfire. Some charred remains were found in buildings.

According to the Department of the Interior and Local Government (DILG), among the deaths were four soldiers—including 2 military officers, one was Maj. David Sabido, commanding officer of the Army's 20th Infantry Battalion; and seven policemen—including the town police chief as well as 3 who guarded a firetruck dispatched to the commercial area. The Armed Forces of the Philippines (AFP) cited reports that two soldiers were likewise killed and three wounded in the encounter.

Also, the PCIBank branch manager was among those killed. At the Allied Bank, several of the employees, as well as three guards, were killed during the attack. Seven bodies were found in the area.

Meanwhile, the number of injured reportedly exceeded 40. (Note: The total number of injuries varied as per sources: 44 (Manila Standard, Time); 47 (Associated Press)) Ten civilians were immediately lifted to Zamboanga City by the Philippine Air Force. According to the Philippine National Police (PNP), 22 wounded, mostly caught on crossfire, troops and firemen rushed to the area, were treated in two municipal hospitals.

=== Damages ===
Most of the town center was destroyed. According to municipal mayor Francisco Fontanar, more than 200 establishments were burned; some even took until midnight to have fires being contained. Meanwhile, cash amounting US$1 million in total, were looted in sacks.

=== Others ===
As the April 4 incident occurred, by 3:00 p.m., a bus company cancelled scheduled trips to Zamboanga del Sur and Iligan.

== Investigation ==
=== Perpetrators ===
It was reported that the raiders were mostly from ASG, which joined forces with another rebel group, the Moro Islamic Liberation Front (MILF), and MNLF renegades being called the Islamic Command Center (ICC). The incident made military intelligence officers to believe that the ASG is receiving help from the MNLF and the MILF. The AFP placed the number of raiders at 227, while the DILG identified four leaders. The security intelligence identified seven MNLF commanders participated in the raid.

The ICC, led by renegade MNLF leader Molham Alam, was said a breakaway faction of MNLF commanders who reverted to its original objective, the secession of Mindanao and the formation of their own independent republic. ICC accused the MNLF of betraying the cause of the Bangsamoro people due to peace negotiations.

MNLF chairman Nur Misuari condemned the attack and the leadership denied their involvement. Contrary to military reports, he said that members were neither present in the attack nor keeping the raiders in their territories. Meanwhile, both the ASG and the ICC claimed responsibility.

Muslim political leaders, MNLF political arm Bangsa Moro Islamic Party, as well as an MNLF adviser, claimed that the military were perpetrators of the attack, which also involved the so-called MNLF Lost Command and mostly non-Muslims. President Ramos debunked these allegations while reporting that at least 30 of the raiders were definitely identified as ASG members. Meanwhile, Maj. Gen. Edgardo Batenga, the newly appointed Southcom chief, dismissed fake news by ASG and MNLF sympathizers on the alleged involvement of the law enforcers.

=== Possible motives ===
While the motive of the assault was generally unknown, there were theories on why it was done. According to the DILG, citing intelligence reports, the assault was launched to avenge the surrenders and capture of some terrorist leaders, including ASG's alleged intelligence chief and operations officer, as well to commemorate their anniversary.

In particular, both the DILG and Angeles said that the attack was in retaliation for the arrest of six suspected Muslim extremists in Caloocan on April 1 for illegal possession of firearms and explosives. The suspects reportedly had links to the group, and were allegedly part of Yousef support network in which two ASG officials who had surrendered in March, as admitted, belonged to. President Ramos said that the assault was apparently aimed to free the ASG leader's son who was among those arrested.

Another theory held that the assault was just a fund raiser for terrorism. Angeles claimed that those stolen would be used for foreign weapons purchases. On the other hand, a government minister stated that it was intended for provocation of a war between Muslims and Christians.

=== Raid as part of an alleged terror plot ===
The attack was said part of the months-long plan by radicals. The raiders, came from parts of Mindanao, had planned to launch simultaneous attacks in key cities in the island. However, the plot, whose original plan was to attack General Santos, was discovered by the intelligence agents, forcing the attackers to divert the assault on Ipil.

Angeles said the raid was being plotted while he was with the ASG. It was led by 30 young Muslims who were sent to Peshawar, Pakistan, for military training. Being known as the "mullah forces," the raid served as their "test mission". A few believed that the assault in such territory unfamiliar to the group was carefully planned.

== Response ==
=== Government actions ===
The Southcom described the siege as a "surprise attack" with burning of several establishments as a diversionary tactic.

President Ramos immediately ordered the Southcom to conduct an operation against the ASG, issued a "shoot-to-kill" order to the group, and placed Ipil under a state of emergency. At weekend, he flew to the town to survey the damage. Meanwhile, the AFP placed Mindanao under red alert following intelligence reports that the rebels are planning further assaults. There were reports that the ASG would relaunch that on Ipil on May 11.

After government officials admitted failure in intelligence by security forces over the attack, on April 6, Ramos dismissed Brig. Gen. Regino Lacson as commanding officer of the AFP Southcom, and Col. Santiago as commander of the 102nd infantry brigade. Likewise, his designation of Lacson as head of law enforcement offensive following the raid was withdrawn.

On April 15, Ramos ordered the PNP to prevent the ASG's access to foreign terrorist supporters.

=== Military offensive ===
In the morning of April 6, an offensive was launched against the rebels, first in the forests of R.T. Lim. Five infantry battalions consisting about 3,000 men, along with a Ranger company and special forces' units, were reportedly initially deployed for the manhunt. Operations were expanded notably to Siocon, Zamboanga del Norte, as the ASG tried to join with the MNLF based there; and to Tungawan. As pursuit operations in the peninsula were going difficult, these were expanded to Sulu.

As raiders might reportedly retreated to MNLF strongholds, several of them evaded a military cordon in Tungawan and returned to their home bases. Some reported to have sought refuge to Sacol Island, a known lair of Zamboanga City-based extremists. The area was heavily bombarded on April 20 where four were killed.

Until the bombardment of Sacol which would be the eighth gunbattle, 46 of the raiders were killed. As of April 9, three soldiers and 3 militiamen were also killed. According to Ramos in a 2015 interview, the rebels were almost eradicated at the northern part of the peninsula, with twenty of them fled to Basilan through a boat.

Remnants of the rebels were reportedly involved in the killings in Tambulig and Zamboanga City; while they were spotted in Molave.

According to the Department of Social Welfare and Development, as of April 18, some 12,020 individuals or 2,600 families from four towns were displaced as a result of the attack and military operations.

On April 13, Government soldiers killed 39 Abu Sayyaf rebels responsible for the attack on Ipil

=== Operations against Janjalani ===
Due to the Ipil incident, Janjalani was later tagged as the country's most wanted rebel. President Ramos gave military commanders 60 days to capture him, but they failed. Janjalani would be killed in a police raid in Lamitan, Basilan, in 1998.

== Charges filed ==
The Criminal Investigation Command filed charges against 20 respondents, with only a policeman and a civilian identified, involved in the raid before the 1st Municipal Circuit Trial Court (Ipil–Tungawan–Roseller T. Lim). Charges were robbery, multiple homicide, multiple frustrated homicide, kidnapping with serious illegal detention, and destructive arson (Presidential Decree 1613).

== Aftermath ==
=== Rehabilitation ===
The national government offered a total of ₱51 million in assistance to Ipil and neighboring areas.

Efforts for rehabilitation of Ipil began by end of April, being led by the DPWH which focused on the building of the new public market and rehabilitation and expansion of the municipal water system. The Departments of Trade and Industry and Agriculture, and the Philippine Charity Sweepstakes Office, were involved in the livelihood initiatives. The Philippine Long Distance Telephone Company provided six very-small-aperture terminal telephones.

The Western Mindanao Disaster Coordinating Council sought the inclusion of the municipalities of Tungawan and Titay as calamity areas due to damages and displaced residents.

Five years after the massacre, Ipil had been fully rehabilitated, which gave way to the municipality becoming the capital of the new province that would be created out of parts of Zamboanga del Sur.

== Reactions ==
The Ipil attack was considered by the Commission of Human Rights as one of the major human rights violations committed by rebel groups.
