= Federico O. Escaler =

Roman Catholic Filipino Prelate

The Most Reverend Federico O. Escaler S.J.
- Prelate of Ipil
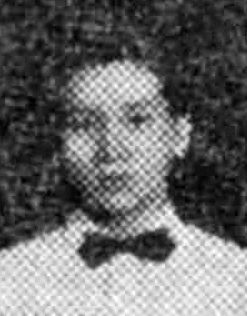
- Escaler in 1941
- See: Ipil
- In office: 1980–1997
- Predecessor: none
- Successor: Antonio Ledesma
- Previous post: Prelate of Kidapawan (1976–1980)

Orders
- Ordination: June 19, 1954 by Francis Cardinal Spellman
- Consecration: July 31, 1976 by Jaime Cardinal Sin

Personal details
- Born: June 28, 1922 Manila, Philippine Islands
- Died: November 28, 2015 (aged 93) San Miguel, Manila, Philippines
- Denomination: Roman Catholic
- Motto: Pro Fide Et Iustitia (For Faith and Justice)
- Coat of arms

Federico O. Escaler, S.J. (June 28, 1922 – November 28, 2015) was a Filipino bishop of the Roman Catholic Church. He served as the founding prelate of Kidapawan (1976–1980) and Ipil (1980–1997), and president of Ateneo de Davao University (1962–1966) and Xavier University (1973–1976).

== Early life and education ==
Known as "Freddy," Escaler was born to an affluent family in San Rafael Street, San Miguel, Manila on June 28, 1922. The third youngest in their brood, he grew up living near the Malacañang Palace, and going to church with his family in either the Augustinian Recollect-run San Sebastian Church or at the Benedictine-run Our Lady of Montserrat Abbey of San Beda College.

He took his pre-school education at the nearby Holy Ghost College, and after his second grade, joined his elder brothers at Ateneo de Manila. Among his teachers in Ateneo was the prolific Jesuit writer and historian, Fr. Horacio de la Costa, who would later deliver the homily during his episcopal consecration. He was a grade school student of Ateneo when their old campus in Intramuros was razed to the ground, promopting the school to move to its Padre Faura campus. During high school, his batchmates include his fellow Jesuits Fr. Jaime Bulatao, Fr. Eduardo Hontiveros, Fr. Emmanuel Gopengco, and future Central Bank of the Philippines Governor Jose B. Fernandez Jr. One of his classmates, Minister of Justice Ricardo Puno Sr., described Escaler as "...a regular guy. We were normal teenagers, with interests centered mostly on girls. And he was certainly one of us as far as that natural inclination was concerned. In fact he had many girl friends. Many girls really admired him…." He likewise narrated that when some of his girl admirers learned that Escaler will join the Jesuits, they visited him a day before he entered the seminary.

Despite initial hesitation from his mother, he entered the Jesuits at the Sacred Heart Novitiate, Novaliches, Quezon City during his birthday in 1941. Among his batchmates were Fr. Teodoro Arvisu, Fr. John Montenegro, and Fr. Vicente San Juan, Raymundo Echaus, and Rafael Santos; they joined the other Jesuits who entered earlier that year, such as Fr. Roque Ferriols, Fr. Santiago Gaa, and Fr. Catalino Arevalo, Fr. Rodolfo Malasmas, Gaudus Perfecto, Expedito Jimenez, and Agustin Natividad. The outbreak of World War II prompted them to move to different locations, first at the Ateneo de Manila campus in Padre Faura, then at the La Ignaciana estate in Sta. Ana, Manila, and eventually returning to Novaliches.

While staying in Ateneo, in 1943, he and his batchmates began their Juniorate. From 1945 to 1948, he took and finished his MA in Philosophy at St. Robert Bellarmine College. During his novitiate, their Novice Master was then-Fr. Vincent Ignatius Kennally, who eventually became Apostolic Vicar of the Caroline Islands. For his Regency, he was assigned at the San Jose Seminary from 1948-1951, where he taught English, Latin, Tagalog, Spanish, Sociology, Philippine Government, and Geometry, as well as serving as Prefect of Discipline to major seminarians and moderator of the choir, Sodality, and INSTA. From 1951-1955, he studied at the Woodstock College, Maryland for his Bachelor (STB) and Licentiate in Theology (STL). He also had special studies in Guidance and Counseling at Boston College and Fordham University from 1954-1955. For his Tertianship, he went to Palacio de Santo Duque, Gandia, Valencia, Spain and stayed until 1956.

== Pastoral ministry ==
He was ordained deacon on June 18, 1954 by the Apostolic Vicar of Carolina and Marshall Island, Bishop Thomas John Feeney. The next day, June 19, 1954, he was ordained priest by New York Archbishop Francis Cardinal Spellman.

Upon returning to the Philippines, he was reassigned to San Jose Seminary as minister, and a year later became the archivist of the then-vice province of the Philippines and Socius to the vice provincial. He also served as director of retreats of the Jesuit Philippine Province from 1957 to 1961, thus enabling him to give retreats in the different parts of the country. In 1961, he became superior and minister of the La Ignaciana Retreat House in Sta. Ana, and from 1962 to 1966, he was the rector and president of Ateneo de Davao. In 1966, he returned to Xavier House to be the province treasurer and chaplain of the Christian Family Movement. In 1973, he became the rector and president of Xavier University, serving until his appointment to the episcopate in 1976.

== Episcopate ==
On June 12, 1976, Escaler was appointed by Pope Paul VI as Prelate of the newly-established Prelature of Kidapawan and titular bishop to the Girus Tarasii. He was consecrated bishop by Manila Archbsihop Jaime Cardinal Sin on July 31, 1976, with Cagayan de Oro Archbishop Patrick Cronin and Cotabato Bishop Gerard Mongeau as co-consecrators, and installed to his new see on September 6, 1976. Escaler would resign as titular bishop of Girus Tarasil on February 18, 1978. On February 23, 1980, Escaler was appointed by Pope John Paul II as Prelate of the newly-established Prelature of Ipil and would remain in the post until his retirement in 1997.

Escaler became prelate of Kidapawan and Ipil in a violent and bloody period. In both of these episcopal assignments, he became notable for his progressive and pro-poor stance. Together with bishops Julio X. Labayen (Prelature of Infanta), Felix Perez (Diocese of Imus), Jesus Varela (Diocese of Sorsogon), Francisco Claver (Diocese of Malaybalay), Antonio Fortich (Diocese of Bacolod) and Orlando Quevedo (his successor in Kidapawan), he was among the so-called "Magnificent Seven," a group of progressive bishops who criticized the Marcos regime during Martial Law. Their open letter discussing the atrocities committed under Martial Law became one of the first instances where the Filipino Catholic hierarchy spoke against Martial Law.

Escaler opted to serve the poor during those times, and advanced the cause of human rights. This made him a target of some reprisals. In February 1985, he and some of his companions were kidnapped by armed men for four days. Years later, he witnessed the 1995 Ipil massacre, where Abu Sayyaf militants stormed the town of Ipil, Zamboanga del Sur, burned the town center, and took hostages.

== Retirement and death ==
He retired as Bishop of Ipil on June 28, 1997, in accordance to the 1983 Code of Canon Law. He was succeeded by his Coadjutor Prelate, then-Bishop (later Archbishop of Cagayan de Oro) Antonio Ledesma. He then spent his retirement years in his ancestral house in San Miguel, Manila, living with his relatives who fondly called him as "Bish." He became the Spiritual Director of Buklod ng Pag-Ibig, Chaplain of the Asian Institute of Management and the Cenacle Prayer Group. In the latter part of 2015, doctors discovered a mass in his liver which he declined further intervention. Weeks before his death, it was said that during the visit of the new parish priest of the nearby National Shrine of St. Michael and the Archangels, Fr. Genaro Diwa, Escaler told Diwa to call him if he needs any help.

He died on November 28, 2015, in his house in San Miguel, Manila. After his wake in the Ateneo de Manila University Campus, he was buried together with his other departed Jesuit brothers at the Sacred Heart Novitiate, Quezon City.
