= Caritas Philippines =

Non-profit Catholic organization (e. 1966)

- Established: 1966
- Type: Nonprofit
- Headquarters: 470 General Luna St., Intramuros
- Location: Manila, Philippines
- Coordinates: 14.58977°N 120.97447°E
- Origins: Catholic Social Teaching
- Region served: Philippines
- Fields: Social work
- Secretary General: Fr. Carmelo “Tito” Caluag (Diocese of Novaliches)
- President: Jose Colin Bagaforo
- Affiliations: Caritas Asia, Caritas Internationalis
- Revenue: ₱126 million (2023)
- Expenses: ₱155 million (2023)
- Website: caritas.org.ph

Caritas Philippines is a non-profit organisation active in the Philippines, founded in 1966. It is the social arm of the Catholic Bishops' Conference of the Philippines and a member of the global Caritas Internationalis confederation and of its regional structure Caritas Asia.

== Structure ==
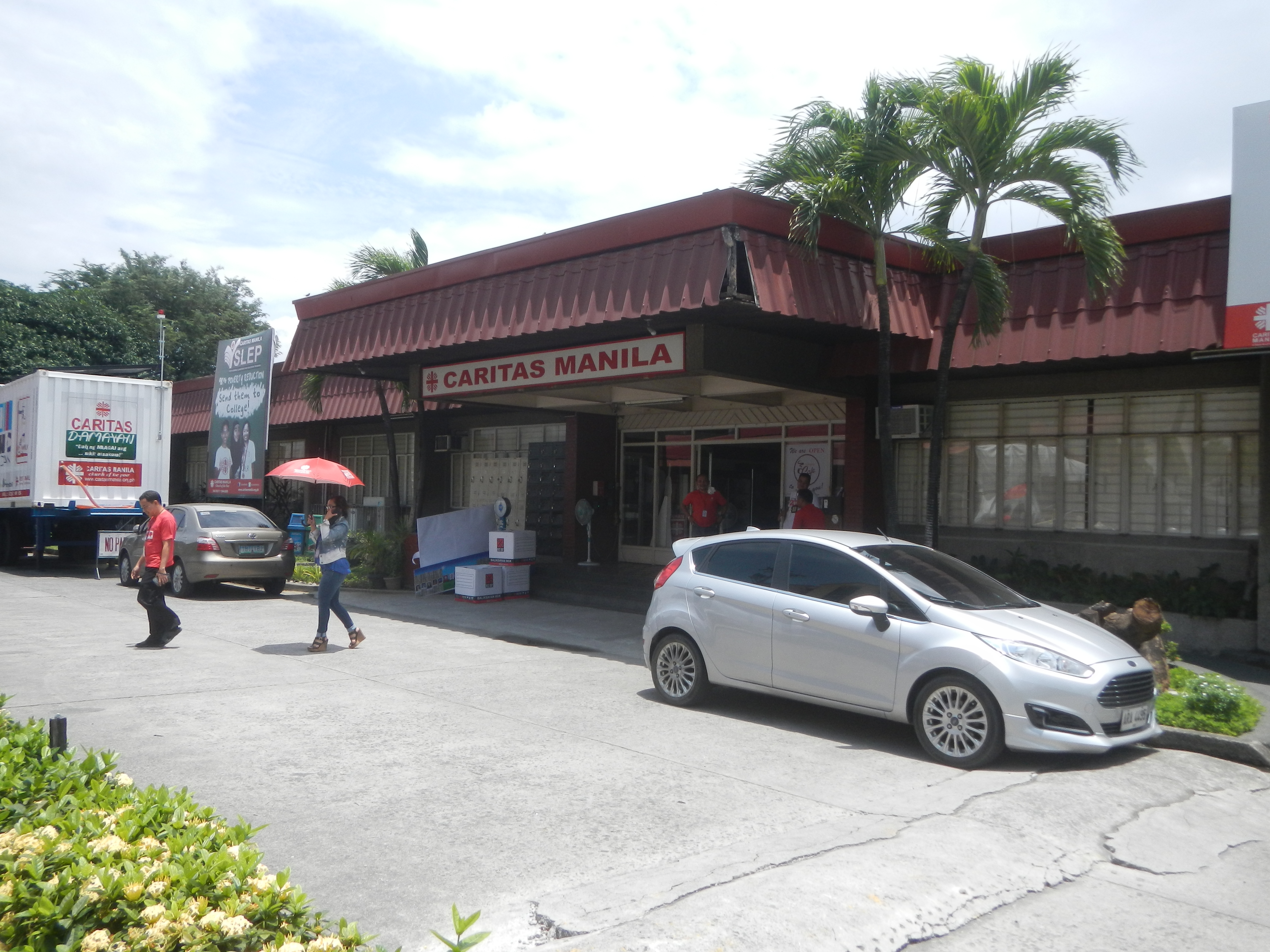
Centre of the diocesan Caritas Manila.

Caritas Philippines consists of the national office, the National Secretariat for Social Action (NASSA), which is legally registered as "CBCP – Caritas Filipinas Foundation Inc.", and 85 Diocesan Social Action Centers (DSACs) which are responsible for coordinating the social welfare work in the parishes and in the local entities named Basic Ecclesial Communities (BECs).

An important fundraising tool is its annual lent campaign Alay Kapwa, first launched in 1975.

== Work ==
Caritas Philippines works on different sector, including on peacebuilding, agrarian justice and microfinance. The organisation also provides emergency relief after natural disaster, including after Typhoon Yolanda (2013) and Typhoon Odette (2021).

In addition, NASSA is also engaged in advocacy.
