= Dinualdo Gutierrez =

Filipino prelate (1939–2019)

- Bishop Emeritus of Marbel
- Diocese: Marbel
- Appointed: 1 October 1981
- Installed: 15 November 1982
- Term ended: 28 April 2018
- Predecessor: Reginald Edward Vincent Arliss
- Successor: Cerilo U. Casicas

Orders
- Ordination: 7 April 1962 by Antonio Frondosa
- Consecration: 28 January 1981 by Antonio Frondosa

Personal details
- Born: Dinualdo Destajo Gutierrez; 20 February 1939 Romblon, Philippines
- Died: 10 February 2019 (aged 79) General Santos, Philippines

Dinualdo Destajo Gutierrez (20 February 1939 – 10 February 2019) was a Filipino prelate of the Roman Catholic Church. He was a bishop of the Diocese of Marbel who served from 1982 to 2018.

== Death ==
In Feb 2019, Gutierrez died from complications owing to prostate cancer and chronic obstructive pulmonary disease.
