= Orlando Quevedo =

Filipino prelate of the Catholic Church (born 1939)

His Eminence Orlando B. Quevedo OMI
- Cardinal; Metropolitan Archbishop Emeritus of Cotabato
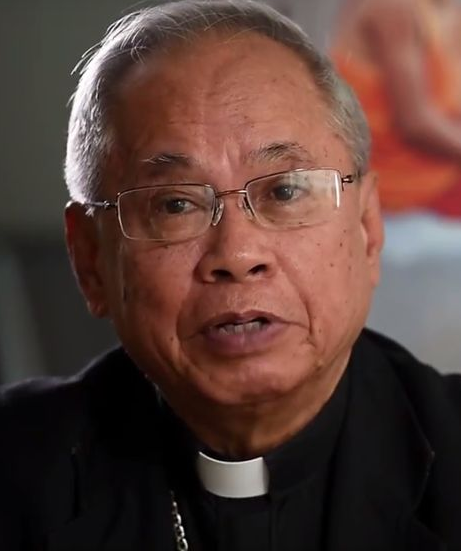
- Quevedo in 2016
- Province: Cotabato
- See: Cotabato
- Appointed: May 30, 1998
- Installed: September 8, 1998
- Retired: November 6, 2018
- Predecessor: Philip Francis Smith OMI
- Successor: Angelito Lampon
- Other post: Cardinal-Priest of S. Maria Regina Mundi a Torre Spaccata (2014–present)
- Previous posts: Bishop of Kidapawan (1980–1986); Archbishop of Nueva Segovia (1986–1998)

Orders
- Ordination: June 5, 1964
- Consecration: November 15, 1982 by Bruno Torpigliani
- Created cardinal: February 22, 2014 by Pope Francis
- Rank: Cardinal priest

Personal details
- Born: March 11, 1939 (age 87) Laoag, Ilocos Norte, Commonwealth of the Philippines
- Motto: Caritas congaudet veritati (Love rejoices in the truth)
- Coat of arms

Ordination history
History
Priestly ordination
- Date: June 5, 1964
Episcopal consecration
- Principal consecrator: Bruno Torpigliani
- Co-consecrators: Philip Francis Smith, OMI; Federico O. Escaler, SJ
- Date: October 28, 1980
Cardinalate
- Elevated by: Pope Francis
- Date: February 22, 2014
Episcopal succession
Bishops consecrated by Orlando Quevedo as principal consecrator
- Jose Colin Bagaforo: April 25, 2006
- Cerilo Casicas: July 11, 2018
- Nick Vaquilar: July 21, 2026

Styles of Orlando B. Quevedo
- Reference style: His Eminence
- Spoken style: Your Eminence
- Religious style: Cardinal
- Informal style: Cardinal

Orlando Beltran Quevedo (Spanish pronunciation: [keˈβeðo]; born March 11, 1939) is a Filipino prelate of the Catholic Church. A cardinal since 2014, he was Archbishop of Cotabato from 1998 to 2018. He became a bishop in 1980.

== Early life ==
Orlando Beltran Quevedo was born on March 11, 1939, in Laoag, Ilocos Norte. Beginning in 1945, he attended grades 1 to 3 in Laoag Shamrock School, and finished grades 4 to 6 in Marbel Central Elementary School in Koronadal, South Cotabato, graduating in 1950. He attended Notre Dame High School in Koronadal from 1950 to 1954.

== Priesthood ==
Quevedo studied at San José Seminary from 1954 to 1956, but spent his novitiate in St. Peter's Novitiate in Mission, Texas. He earned his degree in philosophy from San José Seminary in 1960, and in 1964 received his S.T.B. and MA in Religious Education from Oblate College (Catholic University of America) in Washington, D.C. He was ordained a priest of the Missionary Oblates of Mary Immaculate on June 5, 1964.

In 1964, he was assigned assistant parish priest of Cotabato Cathedral.

== Episcopacy ==
Quevedo was appointed Bishop-Prelate of Kidapawan by Pope John Paul II on October 28, 1980. Upon the prelature's elevation to diocese, he assumed the title Bishop of Kidapawan.

On March 22, 1986, he was named Archbishop of Nueva Segovia in Ilocos Sur, and on May 30, 1998, he was named Archbishop of Cotabato.

== Cardinal ==
On January 12, 2014, Pope Francis named Quevedo as one of 19 men to be inducted into the College of Cardinals in the consistory of February 22, 2014, with the titular church of Santa Maria "Regina Mundi" a Torre Spaccata. He is the first cardinal from Mindanao and, until his 80th birthday, the second Filipino cardinal-elector, along with Luis Antonio Tagle, Archbishop of Manila. Pope Francis named him member in Pontifical Council for Justice and Peace and Pontifical Council for Inter-religious Dialogue.

On November 6, 2018, Pope Francis accepted Quevedo's resignation as archbishop, and appointed Angelito Lampon as his successor.

Cardinal Quevedo ceased to be a cardinal-elector on his 80th birthday in 2019.

Due to COVID-19 pandemic travel restrictions and the vacancy of the Apostolic Nunciature to the Philippines, Cardinal Quevedo installed Charlie M. Inzon as the sixth Apostolic Vicar of Jolo on April 4, 2020, and Jose Cabantan as Archbishop of Cagayan de Oro on August 28, 2020.

== Other posts ==
In 1994, Quevedo received the most votes for election to the General Council of the Secretariat of the Synod of Bishops in Rome.

Quevedo is a former secretary-general of the Federation of Asian Bishops' Conferences and former president of the Catholic Bishops' Conference of the Philippines.

== See also ==
- List of Filipino cardinals
- Cardinals created by Francis

Catholic Church titles
Preceded by Oscar V. Cruz	CBCP President; December 1, 1999 – November 30, 2003	Succeeded by Fernando Capalla
Preceded by Federico Escaler, SJ	Bishop of Kidapawan; July 23, 1980 – March 22, 1986	Succeeded by Juan de Dios Mataflorida Pueblos
Preceded by Jose Tomas Sanchez	Archbishop of Nueva Segovia; March 22, 1986 – May 30, 1998	Succeeded by Edmundo M. Abaya
Preceded by Philip Smith	Archbishop of Cotabato; May 30, 1998 – November 6, 2018	Succeeded by Angelito Lampon
Preceded by Simon Pimenta	Cardinal-Priest of Santa Maria "Regina Mundi" a Torre Spaccata; February 22, 2014 – present	Incumbent
