= Santa Maria Regina Mundi a Torre Spaccata =

- Church of Saint Mary Queen of the World in Torre Spaccata
- Chiesa di Santa Maria Regina Mundi a Torre Spaccata
- Click on the map for a fullscreen view
- 41°51′57″N 12°34′53″E
- Location: Via Alessandro Barbosi 6, Q. Don Bosco, Rome
- Country: Italy
- Language: Italian
- Denomination: Catholic
- Tradition: Roman Rite
- Religious order: Carmelites
- Website: mariareginamundi.org

History
- Status: titular church, parish church
- Dedication: Mary, Queen of the World
- Consecrated: 21 February 1970

Architecture
- Architect(s): Giuseppe Nicolosi, Eugenio Montuori
- Architectural type: Modern
- Groundbreaking: 1968
- Completed: 1970

Administration
- Diocese: Rome

Santa Maria Regina Mundi a Torre Spaccata is a 20th-century parochial church and titular church in eastern Rome.

== History ==
The church was built in 1968–70. It is on a rectangular plan with rounded corners. It has three naves and an altar area aligned with the lantern, and a large polychrome glass window in the apse. The baptistery is on a square plan with a pavilion roof, connected to the body of the church by an exposed concrete beam, which also acts as a lintel. Pope John Paul II visited in 1986.

On 28 June 1988, it was made a titular church to be held by a cardinal-priest.

Titulars

- Simon Pimenta (1988–2013)
- Orlando Quevedo (2014–present)
