= Jose Colin Bagaforo =

Roman Catholic Bishop

The Most Reverend Jose Colin Bagaforo DD
- Bishop of Kidapawan
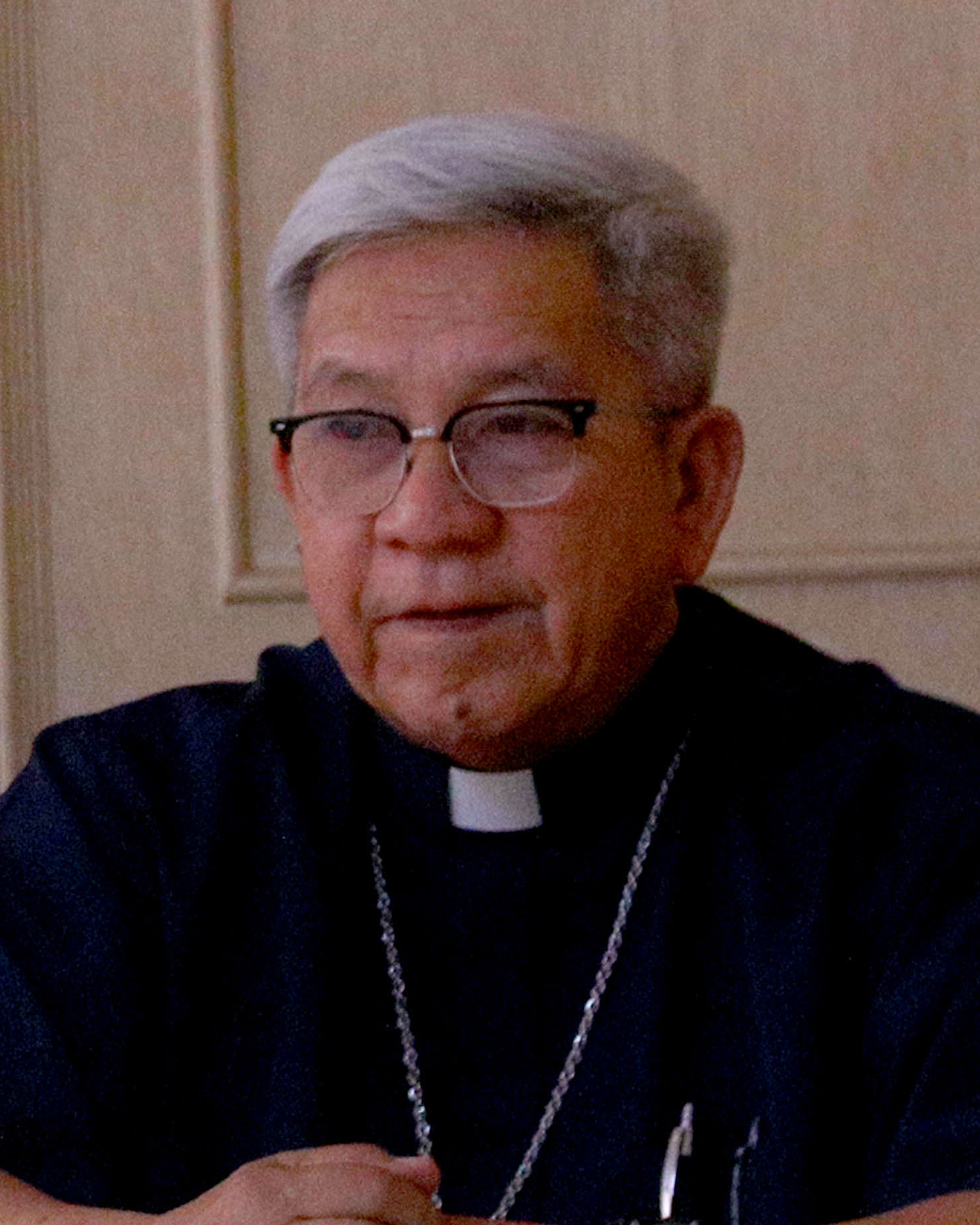
- Bagaforo in 2026
- Church: Catholic Church
- Province: Cotabato
- See: Kidapawan
- Appointed: July 25, 2016
- Installed: September 6, 2016
- Predecessor: Romulo T. Dela Cruz
- Successor: Incumbent
- Previous post: Auxiliary Bishop of the Archdiocese of Cotabato

Orders
- Ordination: March 25, 1980
- Consecration: April 25, 2006 by Orlando Quevedo

Personal details
- Born: January 30, 1954 (age 72) Cotabato City, Maguindanao del Norte, Philippines
- Education: Saint Francis Regional Major University; Xavier University – Ateneo de Cagayan; Weston School of Theology
- Motto: Semper vobiscum ("Always with you")

Ordination history
History
Episcopal consecration
- Principal consecrator: Orlando Quevedo
- Co-consecrators: Fernando Capalla; Angel Lagdameo
- Styles
- Reference style: His Excellency; The Most Reverend
- Spoken style: Your Excellency
- Religious style: Bishop

Jose Colin Mendoza Bagaforo (born January 30, 1954) is a Filipino prelate of the Catholic Church. He is the current Bishop of Kidapawan since 2016 and the president of Caritas Philippines since 2019.

== Early life and education ==
Jose Colin Mendoza Bagaforo was born on January 30, 1954, in Cotabato City, Maguindanao del Norte, Philippines. He studied theology at the Saint Francis Regional Major Seminary in Davao City, and went to Xavier University in Cagayan de Oro to earn his master's degree in education management. He then studied systematic theology at the Weston Jesuit School of Theology in Cambridge, Massachusetts, in the United States.

== Ministry ==
=== Priesthood ===
Bagaforo was ordained a priest on March 25, 1980. During his priesthood, he serves as the president of Notre Dame of Tacurong College and the vicar general of the Roman Catholic Archdiocese of Cotabato.

=== Episcopate ===
On February 2, 2006, Pope Benedict XVI appointed him Auxiliary Bishop of Cotabato and Titular Bishop of Vazari-Didda. He was consecrated bishop on April 25, 2006 by Orlando Beltran Quevedo, Archbishop of Cotobato.

On July 25, 2016, Pope Francis appointed Bagaforo as Bishop of Kidapawan. He was installed on September 6, 2016.

In July 2019, he was elected president of Caritas Philippines. He was reelected in July 2023.

Following the arrest of former President Rodrigo Duterte in March 2025, Bagaforo called it a "crucial move toward justice" for the victims of Duterte's war on drugs, and called on Duterte to cooperate with the investigation of the International Criminal Court (ICC).

In December 2025, Bagaforo was named co-president of Pax Christi, a global Catholic peace movement.

Catholic Church titles
Preceded by Romulo T. de la Cruz	Bishop of Kidapawan; September 6, 2016 – present	Incumbent
Preceded by Rolando Tirona	President of Caritas Philippines; 2019–present	Incumbent
