= Boyongan mine =

Copper mine in Surigao del Norte, Philippines

- Location within Mindanao

Location
- Location: Surigao del Norte, Philippines; 9°39′56″N 125°35′19″E

Production
- Products: Copper

The Boyongan mine is a large copper mine located in the south of the Philippines in Surigao del Norte. Boyongan represents one of the largest copper reserves in the world, having estimated reserves of 300 million tonnes of ore grading 0.6% copper. The mine also has reserves of 9.6 million oz of gold.

Philex Mining Corporation and its unit Philex Gold Philippines Inc. took full control of the mine in February 2009.
