= Louis Lougen =

Leader of the Missionary Oblates of Mary Immaculate

Reverend Louis Lougen OMI
- Superior General of the Missionary Oblates of Mary Immaculate (XII)
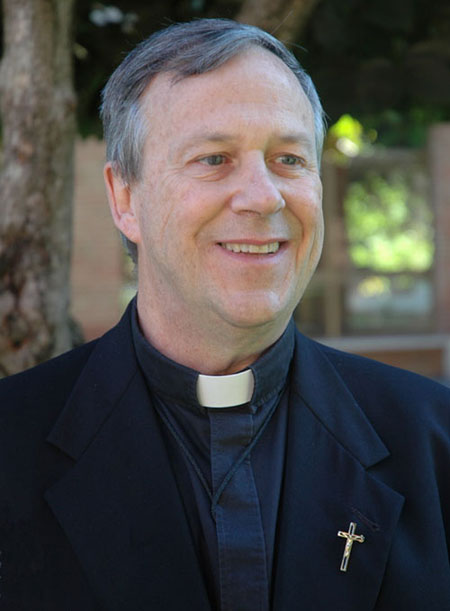
- Louis Lougen in 2011
- Installed: 29 September 2010
- Predecessor: Heinz Wilhelm Steckling

Orders
- Ordination: 1979

Personal details
- Born: Louis Lougen; 1952 (age 73–74) Buffalo, New York
- Denomination: Roman Catholic

Louis Lougen, OMI (born 1952 in Buffalo, New York) was elected Superior General of the Missionary Oblates of Mary Immaculate in 2010, and re-elected in 2016, the year of their 200th anniversary.

Founded in 1815 by Saint Eugene de Mazenod, the Missionary Oblates of Mary Immaculate number approximately 3,800 male missionaries worldwide. Their primary goal, or charism, is the evangelization of the poor to Roman Catholicism. The religious congregation is notable for its historic missionary work in Canada, including administering 57 residential schools., and its ongoing controversies over its administration, including deaths of students in its care. Lougen is the twelfth Superior General since Mazenod's term began in 1816. He succeeds Heinz Wilhelm Steckling.

The congregation has declined in recent years, with Lougen presiding over the diminishing presence of Oblates in parish churches in order to fulfill their missionary charism in other areas.

Lougen made his perpetual vows in Newburgh, New York, in 1976 and was ordained in 1979. Serving 17 years as missionary in the Roman Catholic Archdiocese of São Paulo., he also worked in Washington, DC, and Godfrey, Illinois.

On March 15, 2016, OMI-run Saint Paul University in Ottawa, Ontario, presented Lougen with an honorary doctorate (doctorate honoris causa) as part of the 200th anniversary celebrations of the OMI.

Lougen is currently based in Rome as he fulfils his duties as Superior General of the OMI.
