= Lucien-Antoine Lagier =

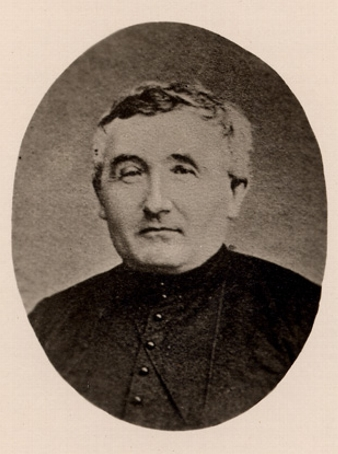
- Born: 4 October 1814; Saint-André-d’Embrun, Hautes-Alpes, France
- Died: 28 February 1874 (aged 59); Isle-Verte, Rivière-du-Loup County, Quebec

Lucien-Antoine Lagier (4 October 1814 – 28 February 1874) was a Canadian priest, Oblate of Mary Immaculate, and preacher.
