= Joseph Fabre =

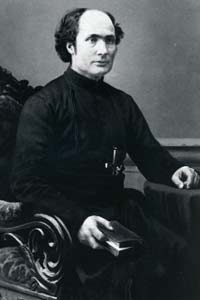
Joseph Fabre.

Joseph Fabre (1824–1892) was the second Superior General of the Oblates of Mary Immaculate.
