= Angelito Lampon =

Filipino Catholic prelate (born 1950)

His Excellency, The Most Reverend Angelito Lampon OMI, D.D.
- Metropolitan Archbishop Emeritus of Cotabato
- Archdiocese: Cotabato
- Appointed: November 6, 2018
- Installed: January 31, 2019
- Retired: September 8, 2025
- Predecessor: Cardinal Orlando Quevedo
- Successor: Charlie Inzon
- Previous post: Apostolic Vicar of Jolo (1997–2018)

Orders
- Ordination: April 1, 1977
- Consecration: January 6, 1998 by Pope John Paul II

Personal details
- Born: March 1, 1950 (age 76) Kidapawan, Cotabato, Philippines
- Denomination: Roman Catholic
- Motto: "Accipe Oblationem Meam" ("Accept, Lord, my offering")

Ordination history
History
Episcopal consecration
- Principal consecrator: Pope John Paul II
- Co-consecrators: Giovanni Battista Re; Jorge María Mejía
Episcopal succession
Bishops consecrated by Angelito Lampon as principal consecrator
- Charlie Inzon: May 21, 2020
- Styles
- Reference style: His Excellency; The Most Reverend
- Spoken style: Your Excellency
- Religious style: Archbishop

Angelito Rendon Lampon (born March 1, 1950) is a Philippine prelate of the Catholic Church who served as Archbishop of Cotabato from 2019 to 2025. He was Apostolic Vicar of Jolo from 1997 to 2018.

== Biography ==
Lampon was born on March 1, 1950, in present-day M'lang, which was then part of Kidapawan in the undivided province of Cotabato. He studied in local schools until 1962 and then at the novitiate in Tamontaka for four years. He studied philosophy at Ateneo de Manila University in 1968–69 and theology first in Quezon City in 1969–71 and then at the Loyola School of Theology from 1972 to 1977.

He was ordained a priest there on March 26, 1977, as a member of the Oblates of Mary Immaculate (OMI).

He was a parish priest in Lebak, Sultan Kudarat and at the Cathedral of Cotabato (1977-1978). He then worked as a staff member of the Notre Dame Archdiocesan Seminary (1979-1981). Within the Oblates he was director of Postulants and Scholastics from 1988 to 1992, Provincial Superior of the Philippine Province from 1988 to 1992, and General Counsellor at their general administration in Rome from 1992 to 1997.

On November 21, 1997, Pope John Paul II appointed him titular bishop of Valliposita and Apostolic Vicar of Jolo, succeeding Bishop Benjamin de Jesus who was assassinated on February 4 of that year. He received his episcopal consecration in Rome from John Paul on January 6, 1998.

Within the Catholic Bishops' Conference of the Philippines, Lampon headed the Commission on Interreligious Dialogue from 2011 to 2017. He then chaired its Commission on Ecumenical Affairs.

On October 27, 2012, Pope Benedict XVI named him a member of the Pontifical Council for Interreligious Dialogue.

On November 6, 2018, Pope Francis appointed him Archbishop of Cotabato succeeding Cardinal Orlando Quevedo who retired five days earlier. He was installed there on January 31, 2019.

Pope Leo XIV accepted Lampon's retirement on September 8, 2025, and appointed Charlie Inzon, Apostolic Vicar of Jolo, as his successor.

Catholic Church titles
Preceded by Orlando Quevedo	Archbishop of Cotabato; January 31, 2019 – September 8, 2025	Succeeded by Charlie Inzon
Preceded by Benjamin de Jesus	Apostolic Vicar of Jolo; November 21, 1997 – November 6, 2018	Succeeded by Charlie Inzon
