= Benjamin de Jesus =

Roman Catholic prelate (1940–1997)

His Excellency, The Most Reverend Benjamin David de Jesus OMI, D.D.
- Apostolic Vicar of Jolo
- See: Apostolic Vicariate of Jolo
- Appointed: October 11, 1991
- Installed: February 15, 1992
- Term ended: February 4, 1997
- Predecessor: George Eli Dion
- Successor: Angelito Lampon
- Other post: Titular Bishop of Bladia

Orders
- Ordination: December 29, 1967
- Consecration: January 6, 1992 by Pope John Paul II

Personal details
- Born: Benjamin David de Jesus; July 25, 1940 Malabon, Rizal, Philippine Commonwealth
- Died: February 4, 1997 (aged 56) Jolo, Sulu, Philippines
- Buried: Jolo Cathedral
- Denomination: Roman Catholic
- Motto: "Amare Est Servire"
- Coat of arms

Styles of Benjamin de Jesus
- Reference style: His Excellency; The Most Reverend
- Spoken style: Your Excellency
- Religious style: Bishop

Benjamin David de Jesus OMI (July 25, 1940 – February 4, 1997) was a Philippine prelate of the Catholic Church who served as the Apostolic Vicar of Jolo from 1992 until his murder in 1997. He was the first Filipino bishop to be assassinated in the history of the Catholic Bishops' Conference of the Philippines.

== Biography ==
Benjamin David de Jesus was born in the Hulong Duhat district of Malabon, Rizal (now part of Metro Manila) on July 25, 1940. He was ordained a priest as a member of the Oblates of Mary Immaculate on December 29, 1967.

On October 11, 1991, Pope John Paul II named him titular bishop of Bladia and Apostolic Vicar of Jolo. He received his episcopal consecration on January 6, 1992 from Pope John Paul. He was installed in Jolo on February 15.

He was shot six times and killed outside Jolo Cathedral on February 4, 1997. A female bystander was killed and several others were wounded. Authorities blamed Abu Sayyaf, a Muslim group intent on disrupting interreligious rapprochement. The crime remains unsolved.

De Jesus was entombed in Jolo Cathedral. His assassination is commemorated annually, usually with demonstrations of Christian-Muslim solidarity. The Ben de Jesus College Library at Notre Dame of Midsayap College is named after him.

Catholic Church titles
| Preceded by George Eli Dion | Apostolic Vicar of Jolo; February 15, 1992 – February 4, 1997 | Succeeded by Angelito Lampon |
| Preceded by José Vilaplana Blasco | — TITULAR — Bishop of Bladia; February 15, 1992 – February 4, 1997 | Succeeded by Oswald Gracias |
