= Tampakan mine =

Mine in South Cotabato, Philippines

Tampakan Copper-Gold Project
- Location: Tampakan, South Cotabato, Philippines
- Products: Copper and Gold
- Production: 375,000 tons (copper; projected); 360,000 ounces in concentrate (gold; projected)
- Opened: N/A (proposed)
- Company: Salvador Zamora

The Tampakan deposit is a large copper and gold orebody located in the south of the Philippines in Tampakan, South Cotabato. Tampakan represents one of the largest copper resources in the Philippines and in the world having an estimated resource of 2.94 billion tonnes of ore grading 0.6% copper. The deposit also has a resource of 18 million oz of gold.

The proposed copper and gold mine is being developed by Sagittarius Mines, Inc. (SMI) under a Financial and Technical Assistance Agreement (FTAA) with the Government of the Republic of the Philippines. SMI is a joint venture between global giant Glencore, Australia's Indophil Resources, and Filipino firm Tampakan Group of Companies. The company is seeking local and national government approval of the proposed mine, including securing the consent of the indigenous people affected by the Project, as required under the Philippine Mining Act of 1995 (Republic Act 7942).

Once approved for operations, the Tampakan Copper-Gold Project will be the largest in the Philippines and among the largest copper mines in the world.

The local government of Tampakan has cancelled its agreement with Sagittarius Mines to develop the reserves into a mine in 2020 alleging that the terms of the deal is lopsided against residents and the community.

In March 2022, MRC Allied sold the Tamapkan mine and its other mining portfolio to Salvador Zamora, youngest brother of Manny Jr and Ronnie Zamora.

== Background ==
The Tampakan gold and copper deposit is situated in the mountains surrounding the town Tampakan in the South Cotabato province in the Philippines. The deposit was discovered in November 1990 by the Australian company Western Mining Corporation, who acquired mining rights in Tampakan through a Financial and Technical Assistance Agreement (FTAA) with the Philippine government. The FTAA was transferred to Sagittarius Mines Inc. (SMI) in 2001 and was extended for another 12 years in 2020.

The development of the project is stalled due to various challenges, including the ban of open-pit mining in the province of South Cotabato in 2010 and a national ban in 2017. In 2020, local authorities in Tampakan cancelled the municipal agreement with Sagittarius Mines, Inc. (SMI) because of the "lopsided nature of the deal" against the local communities. On 19 September 2020, the National Commission on Indigenous Peoples (NCIP) issued a Certification Precondition (CP) to SMI that certifies that the SMI complies with the procedure and process requirements necessary for a mining project in ancestral domain. In March 2022, MRC Allied transferred ownership of the Tampakan mine and its other mining interests to Salvador Zamora. The Zamora family has been active in the mining industry since 1969.

In 2021, the national ban on open-pit mining was lifted, which is said to have opened up the possibility for a revival of the project. According to the Mines and Geosciences Bureau, the Philippines COVID-19 recovery plan for the mineral sector includes the development of the Tampakan project targeted for 2022. South Cotabato Governor Reynaldo Tamayo Jr. confirmed that the Tampakan project will be reassessed as the government wants to proceed with stalled mining projects to support economic recovery efforts. If approved, the Tamkapan project will be one of the largest copper mines in the Philippines with an annual yield of an average of 375,000 tons of copper and 360,000 ounces of gold in concentrate over a period of 17 years.

== Local effects of the projects ==
=== Social and human rights ===
The project site is located on the ancestral land of the Blaan tribe, who will be directly affected by the development of the Tampakan project through the displacement of approximately 4,000 community members. According to the Convergence of Initiatives for Environmental Justice (CIEJ), the project will also affect the Blaan's cultural and Indigenous way of life due to the threat to the local ecosystem.

The project has led to tensions in the region and opposition from Blaan tribe representatives, though the attitude towards the project among Blaan communities is divided. In response to the resistance to the mining project, the project site is heavily militarized and multiple armed clashes have taken place, resulting in at least eight deaths among indigenous peoples and security forces since 2012. Among them is according to an investigation of 30 NGOs the indigenous anti-mining activist Juvy Capion and her two children, who were allegedly shot dead by the Philippines Armed Forces on October 18, 2012. A legal case filed against members of the Philippines Armed Forces for the killing of Juvy Capion and her children was dismissed in October 2013.

In 2012, a Human Rights Impact Assessment conducted by the University of Duisburg-Essen concluded that a large-scale open-pit mine in the context of Tampakan does not fulfill international human rights standards with shortcomings identified in particular with regard to the consultation process with indigenous communities. In response, SMI raised concerns about the assessment's objectivity and criticized the insufficient consideration of the company's perspective.

=== Environmental impact ===
A risk-mapping assessment by the World Resources Institute and the Jesuit Institute of Environmental Science for Social Change (ESSC) found that the Tampakan mine project requires the clearance of 3,935 hectares of forest, which would significantly impact the local ecosystem, including risks to endangered floral and fauna species. In addition, the excavation will break into the aquifer in the area and is very likely to limit the availability and quality of groundwater in the area. Concerns about the project’s environmental impact are also being raised by local advocacy groups, who are petitioning for the ban on open-pit mining to be upheld as the project threatens local food supply, water sources, and the well-being of people. The Davao Association of Catholic Schools also renounces the project over concerns around the threat of contamination to the local river systems. In particular, fear is expressed about a possible recurrence of the Marcopper disaster, where a leak has led to severe impacts on the river system and the health and livelihood of local communities.
