= Apostolic Vicariate of Jolo =

Catholic missionary jurisdiction in the Philippines

Apostolic Vicariate of Jolo Vicariatus Apostolicus Ioloensis

Catholic

Location
- Country: Philippines
- Territory: Sulu and Tawi-Tawi
- Ecclesiastical province: Immediately subject to the Holy See

Statistics
- Area: 2,687.8 km^{2} (1,037.8 sq mi)
- Population: Total; Catholics: (as of 2021); 1,374,259; 19,240 (1%)
- Parishes: 5

Information
- Denomination: Catholic Church
- Sui iuris church: Latin Church
- Rite: Roman Rite
- Established: 28 October 1953
- Cathedral: Cathedral of Our Lady of Mount Carmel
- Patron saint: Our Lady of Mount Carmel
- Secular priests: 12

Current leadership
- Pope: Leo XIV
- Vicar Apostolic: Gerry Gamaliel S. Delos Reyes, O.M.I. (Bishop-elect)

The Apostolic Vicariate of Jolo is a Latin Catholic missionary pre-diocesan jurisdiction that covers the Sulu and Tawi-Tawi provinces in southern Philippines.

It is directly exempt to the Holy See, specifically to the Roman Congregation for the Evangelization of Peoples, and is not part of any ecclesiastical province. However, for the purpose of apostolic cooperation, it is sometimes grouped with the Archdiocese of Zamboanga.

Its cathedral episcopal see is the Cathedral of Our Lady of Mount Carmel, in Jolo, Sulu.

== History ==
It was established on 28 October 1953 as Apostolic Prefecture of Sulu, of territory split off from the then Territorial Prelature of Cotabato and Sulu (now the Archdiocese of Cotabato).

It was promoted and renamed after its see on 12 July 1958 as Apostolic Vicariate of Jolo, led by a titular bishop.

== Ordinaries ==
Apostolic prefect of Sulu (1954–1958)

Name		Period in office
1.	Fr. Francis Joseph McSorley, O.M.I.	1954 – July 12, 1958

Apostolic vicars of Jolo (1958–present)

Name		Period in office	Coat of arms
1.	Bishop Francis Joseph McSorley, O.M.I.	July 12, 1958 – November 20, 1970+, died in office (12 years, 131 days)	
2.	Bishop Philip Francis Smith, O.M.I.	June 26, 1972 – April 11, 1979, transferred to Cotabato (6 years, 289 days)	
3.	Bishop George Eli Dion, O.M.I.	January 28, 1980 – October 11, 1991, resigned (11 years, 256 days)	
4.	Bishop Benjamin D. de Jesus, O.M.I.	October 11, 1991 – February 04, 1997, died in office (5 years, 116 days)	
5.	Bishop Angelito R. Lampon, O.M.I.	November 21, 1997 – November 06, 2018, transferred to Cotabato (20 years, 350 days)	
–	Fr. Romeo S. Saniel, O.M.I.	December 16, 2018 – April 04, 2020, apostolic administrator (1 year, 110 days)	
6.	Bishop Charlie M. Inzon, O.M.I.	April 04, 2020 – September 08, 2025, transferred to Cotabato (5 years, 157 days)	
6.	Gerry Gamaliel S. Delos Reyes, O.M.I. (bishop-elect)		
