= Archdiocese of Cotabato =

Latin Catholic archdiocese on Mindanao in the Philippines

Coordinates: 7.2211°N 124.2470°E

Metropolitan Archdiocese of Cotabato Archidioecesis Metropolitae Cotabatensis Kalakhang Arkidiyosesis ng Cotabato (Tagalog) Arkidiyosis Metropolitano sang Cotabato (Hiligaynon) Artsidiyosesis Metropolitano sa Cotabato (Cebuano) Arquidiócesis Metropolitano de Cotabato (Spanish)

Catholic
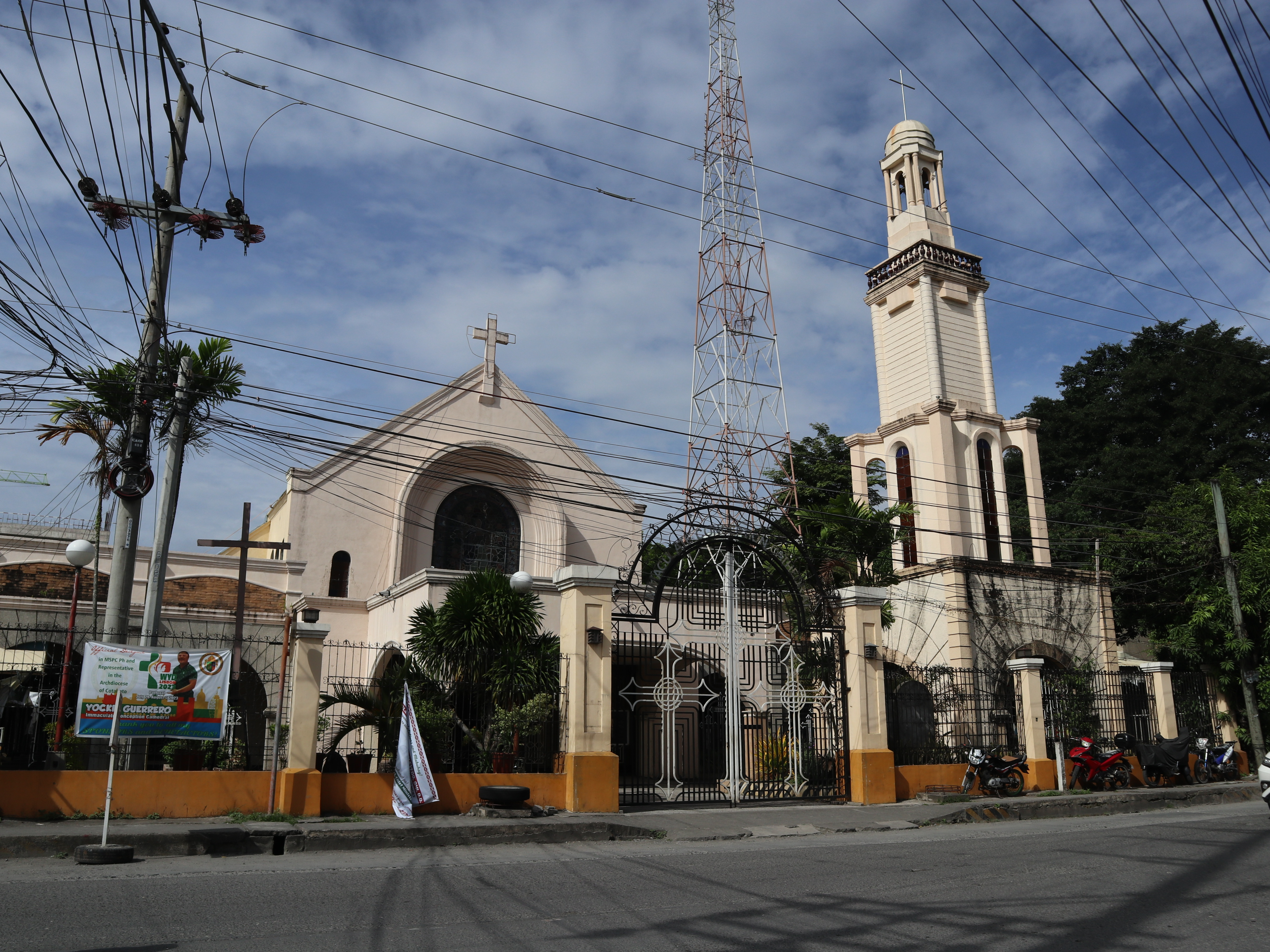
- Cotabato Cathedral

- Coat of arms

Location
- Country: Philippines
- Territory: Cotabato City; Maguindanao del Norte; Maguindanao del Sur; western Cotabato (Alamada, Aleosan, Banisilan, Libungan, Midsayap, Pigcawayan, Pikit); Sultan Kudarat (except for Columbio and Milbuk, Palimbang)
- Ecclesiastical province: Cotabato

Statistics
- Area: 9,575 km^{2} (3,697 sq mi)
- Population: Total; Catholics: (as of 2021); 2,403,120; 1,095,170 (45.6%)

Information
- Denomination: Catholic
- Sui iuris church: Latin Church
- Rite: Roman Rite
- Cathedral: Cathedral of the Immaculate Conception in Cotabato

Current leadership
- Pope: Leo XIV
- Metropolitan Archbishop: Charlie M. Inzon
- Suffragans: Cerilo Allan U. Casicas (Marbel) Jose Colin M. Bagaforo (Kidapawan)
- Bishops emeritus: Cardinal Orlando Quevedo (archbishop, 1998–2018); Angelito Lampon (archbishop, 2018–2025)

Map
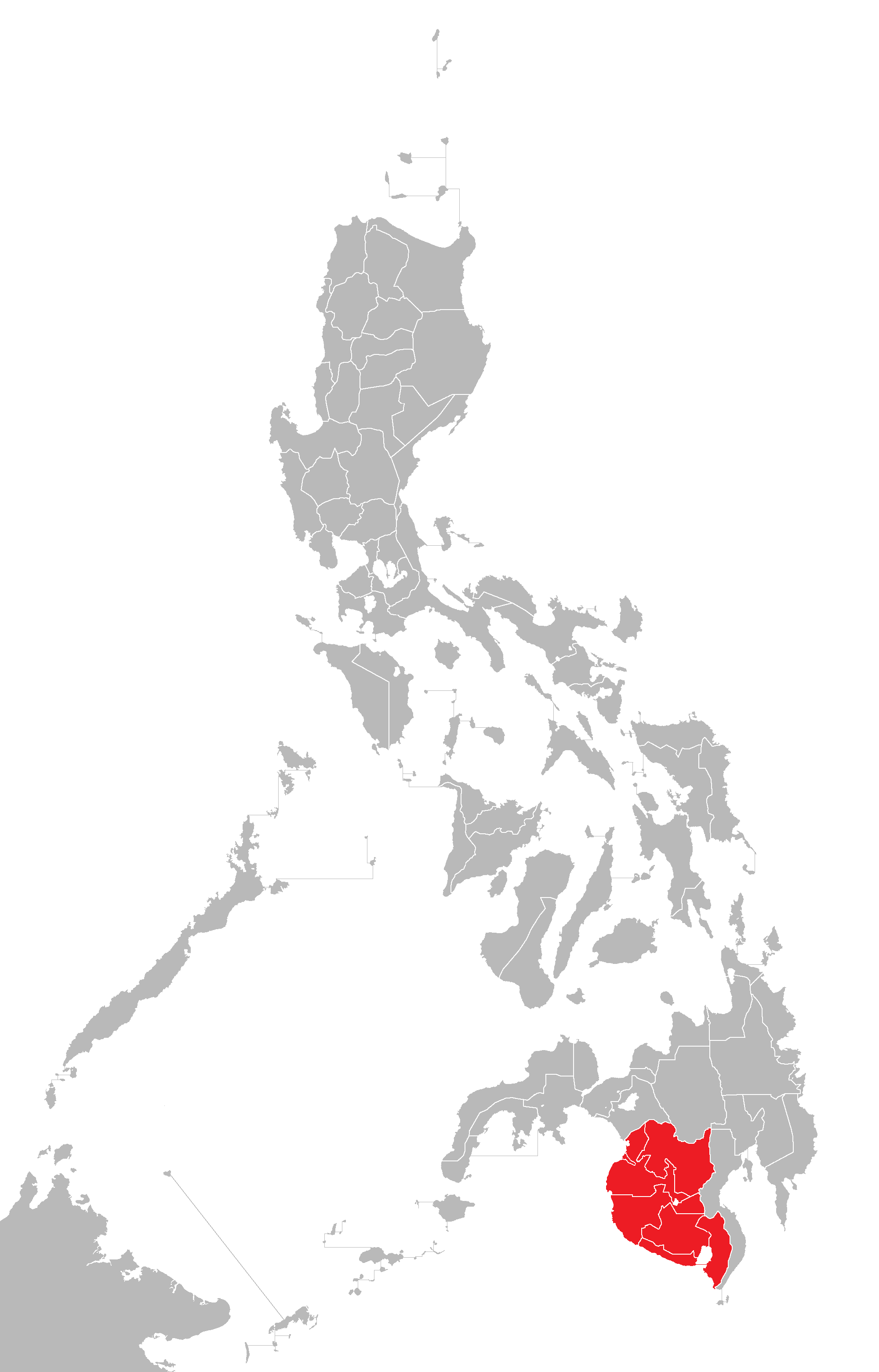
- Jurisdiction of the metropolitan see within the Philippines

The Metropolitan Archdiocese of Cotabato is a Latin Catholic metropolitan archdiocese of the Catholic Church on the island of Mindanao, the Philippines. The archdiocese includes Cotabato City, Maguindanao del Norte, Maguindanao del Sur, western Cotabato, and Sultan Kudarat (except for Columbio and Milbuk, Palimbang.

Its seat is the Cathedral of the Immaculate Conception in Cotabato City. The Archbishop's Palace is at 158 Sinsuat Avenue, Rosary Heights, Cotabato City.

== History ==
On 11 August 1950, the Territorial Prelature of Cotabato and Sulu was formed out of the Diocese of Zamboanga. The Territorial prelature included the three provinces of North Cotabato, Sultan Kudarat and Maguindanao.

On 28 October 1953 it was renamed Territorial Prelature of Cotabato when it lost territory to the new the Apostolic Prefecture of Sulu. It lost territory again on 17 December 1960 to establish the Territorial Prelature of Marbel.

On 5 November 1979, Pope John Paul II elevated the Diocese of Cotabato to the Metropolitan Archdiocese of Cotabato.

Coat of arms of the then-Territorial Prelature of Cotabato

== Ordinaries ==
=== Metropolitan archbishops ===
Archbishop		Period in office	Coat of arms
1.	Gerard Mongeau, OMI	March 27, 1951 - 12 June 1976 (as territorial prelate of Cotabato and Sulu and territorial prelate of Cotabato) (25 years, 77 days); 12 June 1976 - 5 November 1979 (as bishop of Cotabato) (3 years, 146 days); 5 November 1979 - 14 March 1980 (as archbishop of Cotabato) (130 days)	
2.	Philip F. Smith, OMI	14 March 1980 - 30 May 1998 (18 years, 77 days)	
3.	Orlando B. Cardinal Quevedo, OMI	30 May 1998 - 6 November 2018 (20 years, 160 days)	
4.	Angelito Lampon, OMI	(6 November 2018 – 8 September 2025) (6 years, 306 days)	
5.	Charlie Malapitan Inzon, OMI	(8 September 2025 – present) (357 days)	

=== Auxiliary bishops ===
Bishop		Period in office	Coat of arms
1.	Antonino Francisco Nepomuceno	11 July 1969 (appointed) - 11 December 1979 (resigned)	
2.	José Colin Mendoza Bagaforo	2 Feb 2006 (appointed) - 25 July 2016 (appointed bishop of Kidapawan)	

== Province ==
Its ecclesiastical province comprises the metropolitan's own archbishopric and the suffragan dioceses of Kidapawan and Marbel.

== Suffragan dioceses ==
Diocese	Bishop	Period in office	Coat of arms
Kidapawan (Cotabato and Maguindanao)	Jose Colin Mendoza Bagaforo	September 6, 2016 – present (9 years, 359 days)	
Marbel (South Cotabato, General Santos, Sarangani and Sultan Kudarat)	Cerilo Uy Casicas	July 11, 2018 – present (8 years, 51 days)	

== Religious congregations in the archdiocese ==
Men

- Congregation of the Passion (Passionist Fathers)
- Oblates of Mary Immaculate
- Society of Mary or Marist Fathers
- Little Brothers of Mary or Marist Brothers

Women

- Oblates of Notre Dame
- Religious of the Virgin Mary
- Siervas de la Nuestra Senora dela Paz
- Dominican Sisters of Saint Catherine of Siena
- Religious des Notre Dame de Missions
- Carmelite Sisters of Charity
- Passionist sisters
- Associates of Notre Dame
- Xaverian Missionaries of Christ Jesus with missions in Pastoral and Social Services in the Sanitarium and Provincial Jail in Cotabato and in Langgal, Senator Ninoy Aquino, Sultan Kudarat Province

Lay congregation

- Order of Augustinian Discalced (OAD Lay)

== See also ==
- Catholic Church in the Philippines
