= Charlie Inzon =

Bishop of the Roman Catholic Church (born 1965)

His Excellency, The Most Reverend,Archbishop Charlie Inzon OMI, D.D.
- Metropolitan Archbishop of Cotabato
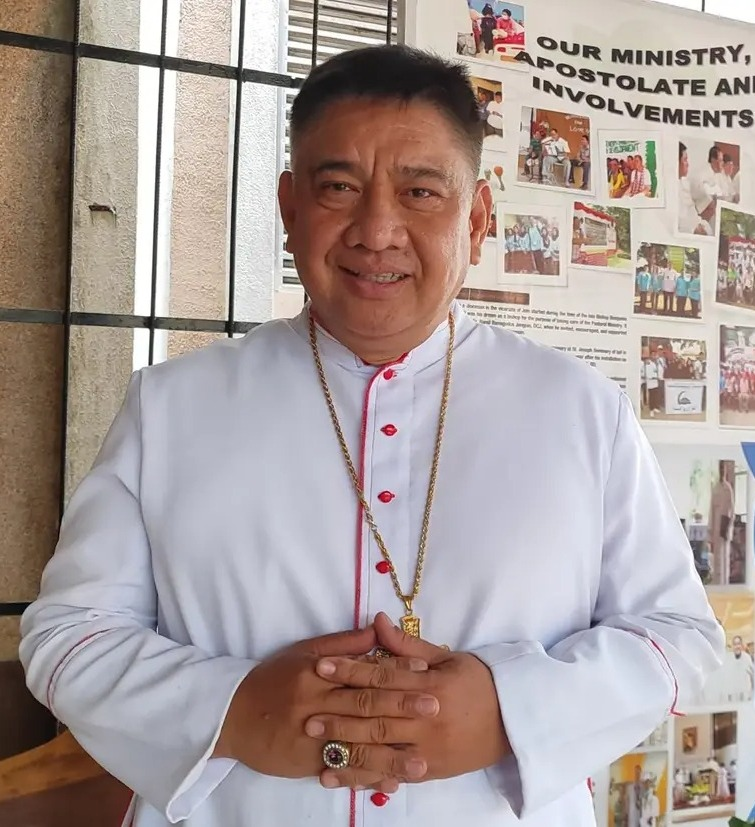
- Inzon in 2023
- Church: Roman Catholic Church
- See: Cotabato
- Appointed: September 8, 2025
- Installed: December 08, 2025
- Predecessor: Angelito Lampon
- Previous posts: Provincial Superior of the Oblates of Mary Immaculate in the Philippines (2018–2020); Apostolic Vicar of Jolo (2020–2025)

Orders
- Ordination: April 24, 1993
- Consecration: May 21, 2020 by Angelito Lampon

Personal details
- Born: Charlie Malapitan Inzon; November 24, 1965 (age 60) Pilar, Sorsogon, Philippines
- Motto: Vos Amici Mei Estis "You are My friends" (John 15:14)
- Coat of arms

Styles of Charlie Inzon
- Reference style: His Excellency; The Most Reverend
- Spoken style: Your Excellency
- Religious style: Bishop

Charlie Malapitan Inzon OMI (born November 24, 1965) is a Filipino bishop and prelate of the Roman Catholic Church, serving as Metropolitan Archbishop of Cotabato. He previously served as the Apostolic Vicar of Jolo from 2020 to 2025.

== Early life and education ==
Inzon was born on November 24, 1965, in Putiao, Pilar, Sorsogon, Philippines. He joined the Missionary Oblates of Mary Immaculate (O.M.I.) in 1982 and made his perpetual vows on September 8, 1990. He pursued his philosophical studies at Notre Dame University in Cotabato City from 1988 to 1993 and later continued his theological studies at the Loyola School of Theology at the Ateneo de Manila University from 1993 to 1994, where he obtained a master's degree. Inzon furthered his academic formation by earning a doctorate in psychology at the same institution from 2002 to 2008.

== Priesthood ==
Ordained on April 24, 1993, in Caloocan City, Inzon began his priestly ministry as a chaplain at Notre Dame of Jolo College in Sulu from 1993 to 1995. He was then assigned to lead the O.M.I. mission station in Batu-Batu, Tawi-Tawi, from 1995 to 1998. He continued his pastoral service as an assistant parish priest at Our Lady of Lourdes Parish in Bangong Barrio, Caloocan City from 1998 to 1999, and at Sto. Niño Parish in Midsayap, Cotabato from 1999 to 2000.

Inzon was also actively involved in the formation of seminarians. From 2000 to 2007, he served as Director of the O.M.I. College Seminary in Quezon City. His academic contributions extended to Notre Dame of Jolo College, where he was appointed Director of Research in 2007 and later served as Dean of the Graduate School from 2009 to 2010. He then assumed the presidency of Notre Dame of Jolo College from 2010 to 2014 before taking on the leadership of Notre Dame University in Cotabato City from 2014 to 2018.

Recognized for his leadership within the Oblates of Mary Immaculate, Inzon was appointed Provincial Superior of the congregation in the Philippines on January 12, 2018.

== Episcopal ministry ==
=== Apostolic Vicar of Jolo (2020-2025) ===
On April 4, 2020, Pope Francis appointed Inzon as the Apostolic Vicar of Jolo, succeeding Bishop Angelito Lampon, O.M.I. His episcopal consecration took place on May 21, 2020, at the Immaculate Conception Cathedral in Cotabato City, with Archbishop Angelito R. Lampon, O.M.I., as the principal consecrator. Co-consecrators included Cardinal Orlando B. Quevedo, O.M.I. of Cotabato, and Bishop Jose Colin Bagaforo of Kidapawan. Due to the COVID-19 pandemic in the Philippines, the ceremony was held with limited attendance and was live-streamed for the faithful.

He was officially installed as the Apostolic Vicar of Jolo on July 16, 2020, at the Cathedral of Our Lady of Mt. Carmel in Jolo, Sulu. The installation was presided by Cardinal Orlando B. Quevedo and Arbishop Angelito R. Lampon.

Upon his installation, Inzon emphasized his commitment to peacebuilding in the region, recognizing it as a pastoral priority. He expressed his dedication to continuing efforts aimed at ending armed conflict and violence in Sulu province. Inzon highlighted the importance of proactive peace-making and building initiatives to reduce violent encounters affecting the community.

In August 2020, following twin bombings in Jolo that resulted in multiple casualties, Inzon appealed for an end to violence and urged authorities to consult local stakeholders before considering measures such as the imposition of martial law. He stressed the importance of community support and cooperation to achieve lasting peace in the region.

=== Archbishop of Cotabato (2025-present) ===
Pope Leo XIV appointed Inzon as the fifth Metropolitan Archbishop of Cotabato on September 8, 2025, succeeding Lampon. He was installed on December 8, 2025, on the Solemnity of the Immaculate Conception. He and fellow Filipino archbishops David William Antonio of Nueva Segovia and Alberto Uy of Cebu received the pallium from Pope Leo on June 29, 2026, the Solemnity of Saints Peter and Paul.

== See also ==
- Apostolic Vicariate of Jolo
- Missionary Oblates of Mary Immaculate

Catholic Church titles
| Preceded by Larry de Guia | Provincial Superior of the Missionary Oblates of Mary Immaculate in the Philippines; January 12, 2018 – May 21, 2020 | Succeeded by Gerry delos Reyes |
| Preceded by Angelito Lampon | Apostolic Vicar of Jolo; July 16, 2020 – September 8, 2025 | Sede vacante |
| Preceded by Angelito Lampon | Archbishop of Cotabato; September 8, 2025 – present | Incumbent |
