= Pasig Cathedral =

Roman Catholic church in Pasig, Philippines

- Immaculate Conception Cathedral
- Katedral at Parokya ng Kalinis-linisang Paglilihi (Filipino); Catedral y Parroquia de la Inmaculada Concepción (Spanish)
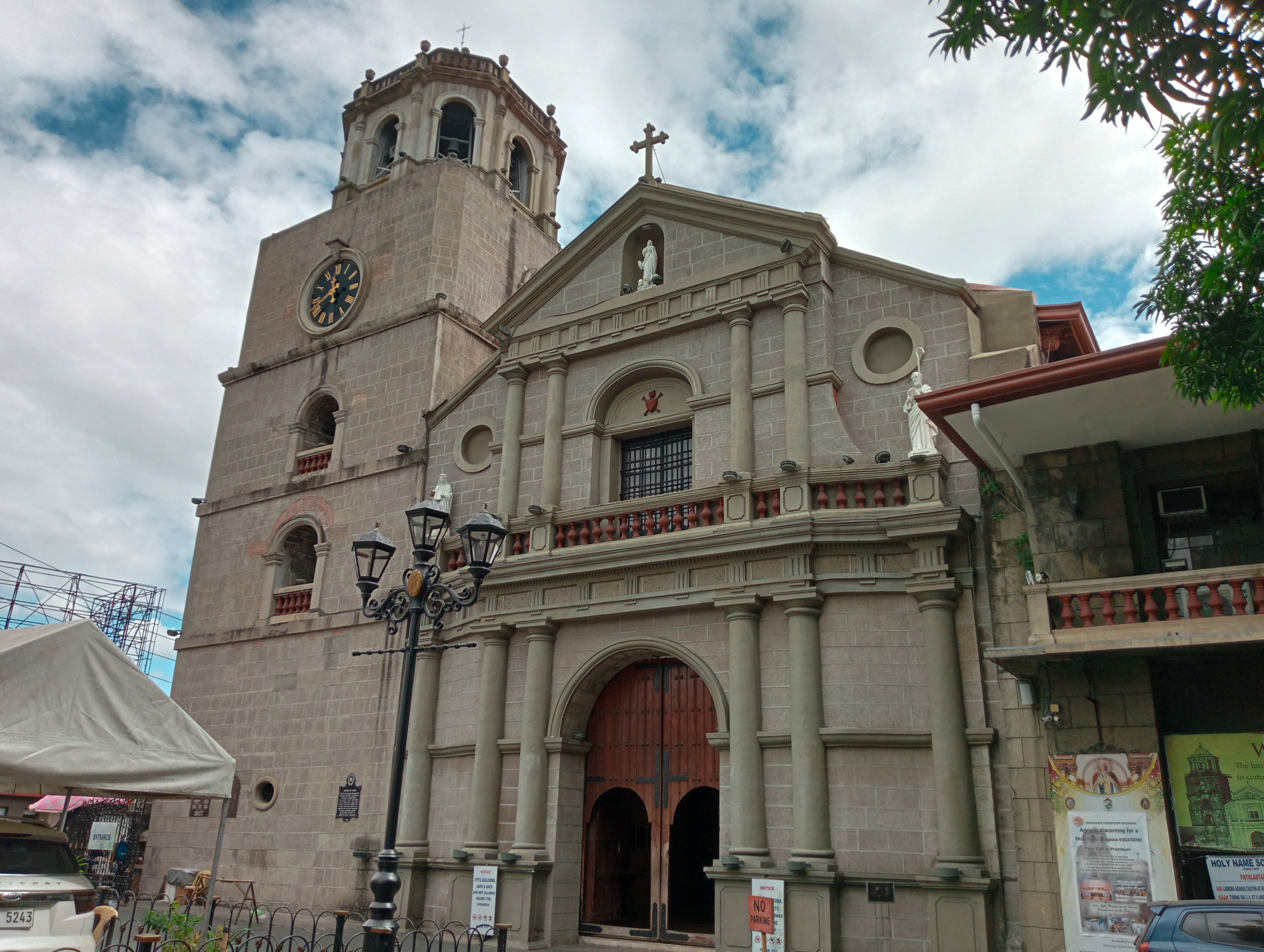
- Cathedral facade in February 2024
- Pasig Cathedral
- 14°33′37.44″N 121°4′38.6″E
- Location: Plaza Rizal, Barangay Malinao, Pasig
- Country: Philippines
- Denomination: Roman Catholic
- Website: iccpasig.org/home

History
- Former name: Immaculate Conception Parish
- Founded: July 2, 1573
- Dedication: Immaculate Conception
- Earlier dedication: Our Lady of the Visitation

Architecture
- Architectural type: Church building
- Style: Baroque

Administration
- Province: Manila
- Diocese: Pasig
- Deanery: Immaculate Conception

Clergy
- Bishop: Mylo Hubert Claudio Vergara
- Rector: Rev. Fr. Mariano L. Baranda

Immaculate Conception Cathedral, commonly known as Pasig Cathedral, is a Roman Catholic church located in Plaza Rizal, Barangay Malinao, Pasig in Metro Manila, Philippines. It is the mother church, and serves as the episcopal seat of the Bishop of Pasig and is one of the oldest structures in the city.

The church was founded as a parish by the Augustinian missionaries on July 2, 1573, coinciding with the foundation of the town of Pasig. Initially, the parish was consecrated to the Visitation of Our Lady, but on April 25, 1587, was changed to Our Lady of the Immaculate Conception, the patroness of the Augustinian priests during that time.

The parish was administered by the CICM Fathers from 1910 to 1979, after which the Filipino clergy took over the pastoral leadership of the parish. Until 2003, the parish was a part of the Archdiocese of Manila. During the time of Manila Archbishop Cardinal Jaime Sin, the parish belonged to the Ecclesiastical District of Makati until October 2001, when it became part of the newly created Ecclesiastical District of Pasig. On August 21, 2003, the district was elevated as a separate and independent diocese, with the elevation of the parish into the status of a cathedral. The present parish priest and rector of the cathedral is Mariano L. Baranda.

== History ==
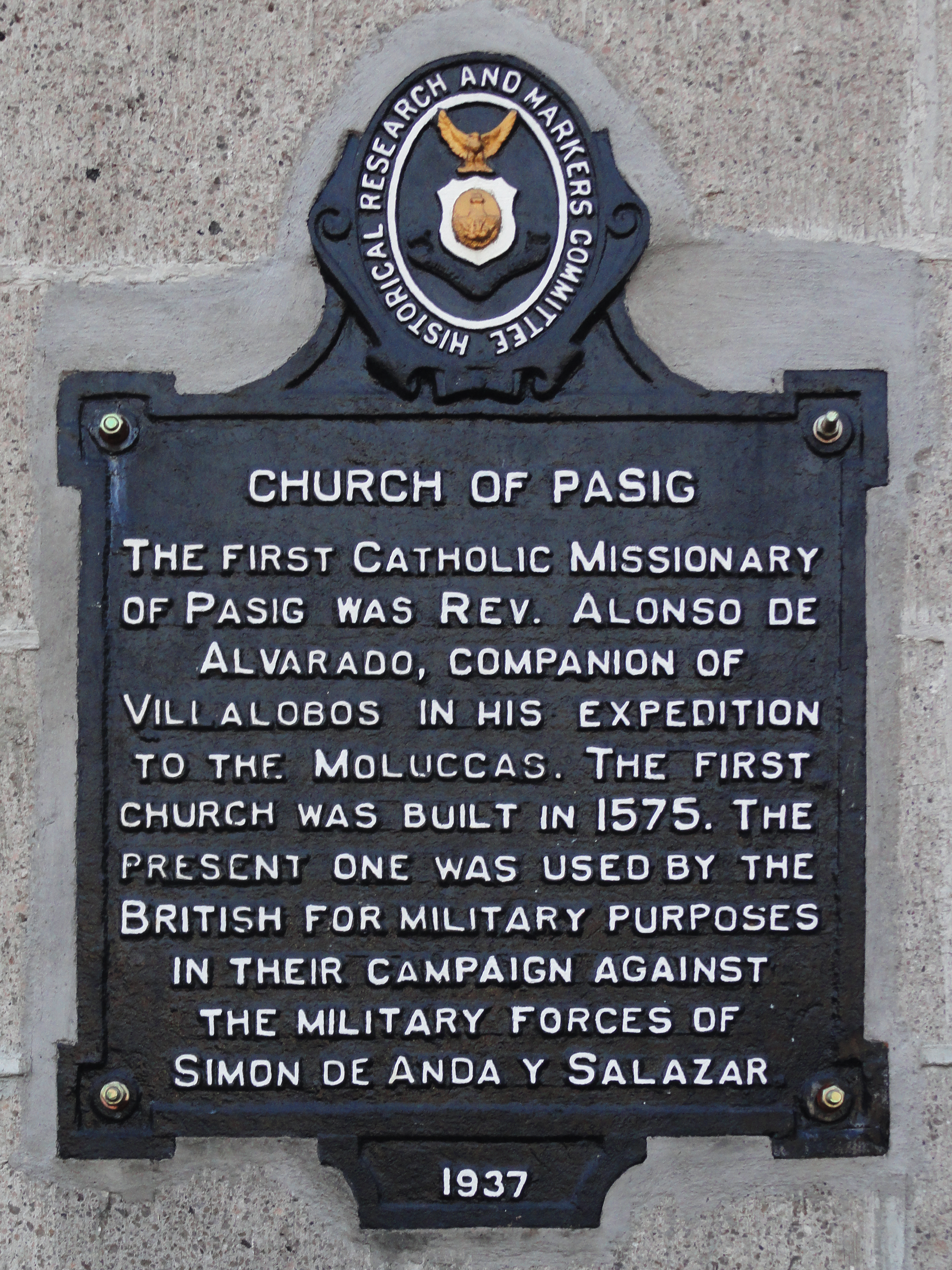
Church HRMC historical marker installed in 1937

The Immaculate Conception Parish was initially established as a mission-parish by an Augustinian friar, Alonso de Alvarado, on January 20, 1572, in the village of Pinagbuhatan. However, frequent flooding in the original site prompted the Augustinian priests to relocate it to higher ground, where the cathedral now stands.

On July 2, 1573, coinciding with the establishment of the town (now city) of Pasig, the church was consecrated to the Our Lady of the Visitation, which served as the first patroness of Pasig. The town patroness was eventually changed into the Our Lady of the Immaculate Conception on April 25, 1587.

During the brief British occupation of Manila in 1762 to 1764, the church served as the British military headquarters, its belfry used as a watchtower against the Spanish defenders.

After the Augustinians, the CICM missionaries arrived and began the administration of the parish in 1910. Three years later, the congregation founded the first parochial school for boys (present-day Pasig Catholic College). In 1979, the diocesan clergy from the Archdiocese of Manila took over the supervision of the parish, and Manuel Sobreviñas, then auxiliary bishop of Manila, became the first Filipino parish priest. Assisting him as parochial administrator was Andres Desmet.

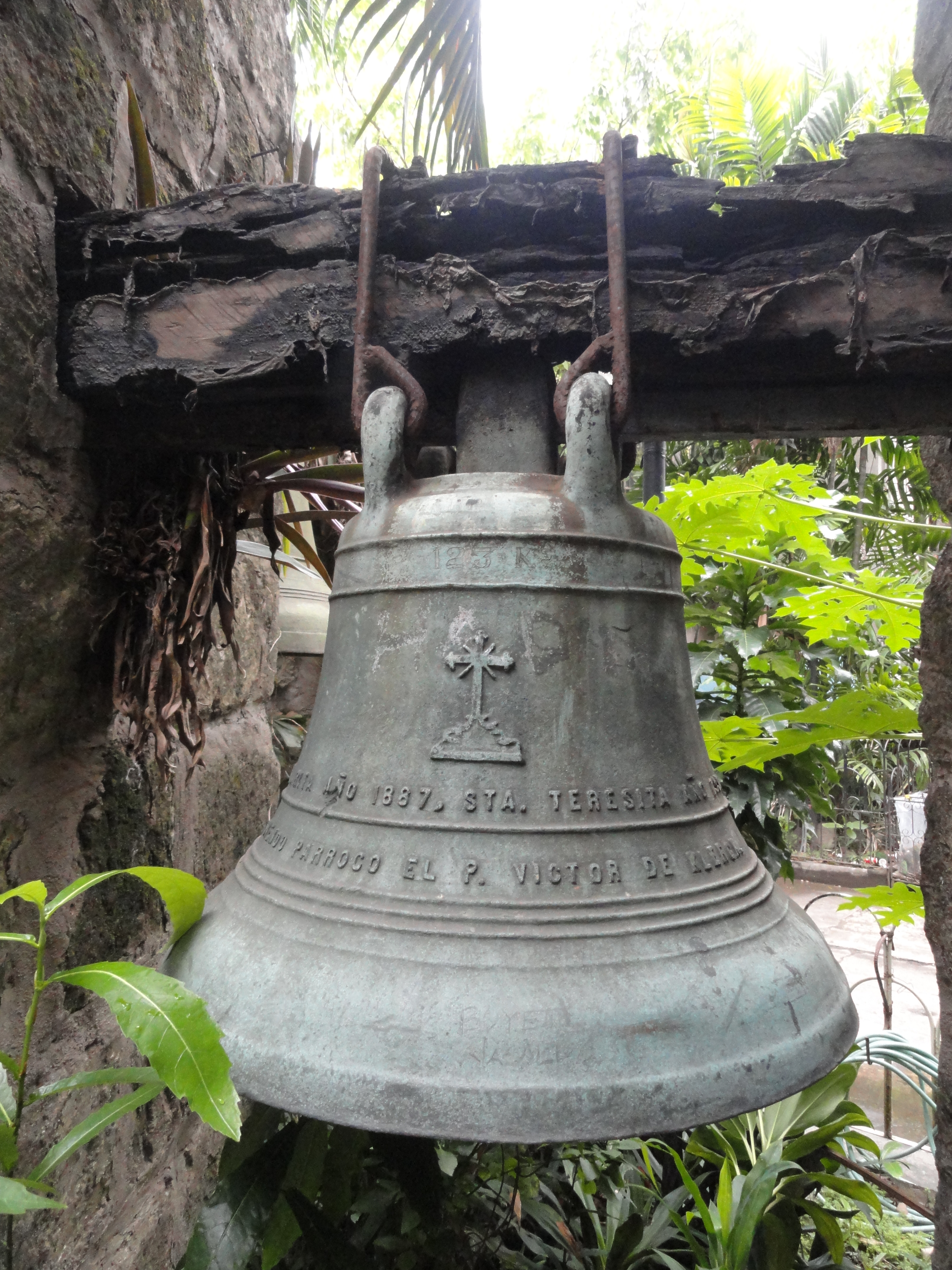
An 18th century bell located at the church grounds

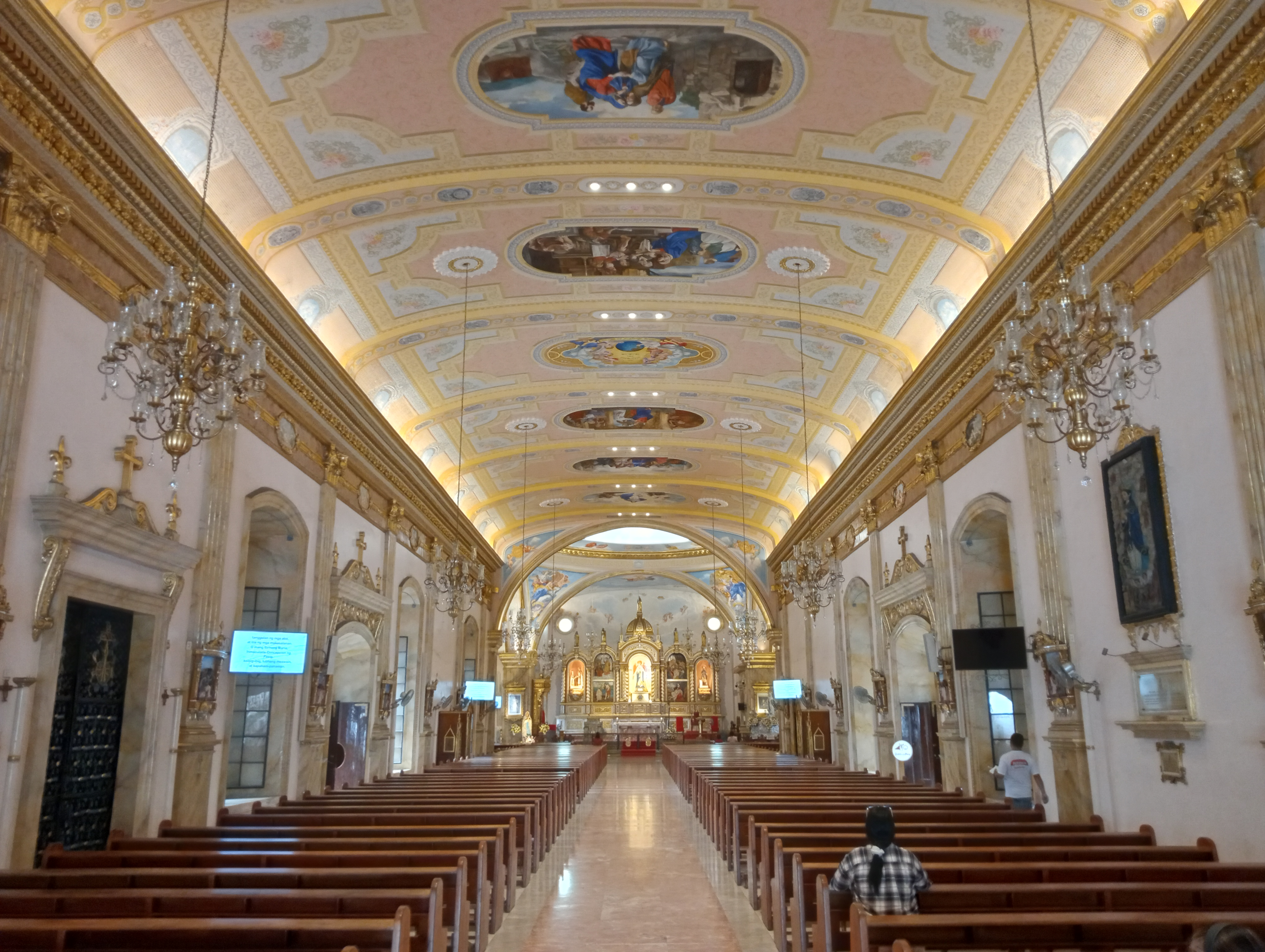
Cathedral interior in 2024

In 1993, Sobreviñas became the bishop of the Diocese of Imus. Emmanuel Sunga became the new pastor, and was transferred to Santo Niño Parish in Tondo, Manila four years later. Manuel Gabriel came to Pasig in 1997 from the Most Holy Trinity Parish in Balic-balic, Sampaloc, Manila, and it was during his term that the parish had electronic chromatically tuned carillon bells installed in its belfry. The Immaculate Conception Parish was declared one of the Jubilee churches in the Archdiocese of Manila in the year 2000.

In October 2001, the Ecclesiastical District of Pasig was created, covering the Vicariate of the Immaculate Conception, along with the parishes of Pateros and Taguig. Nestor Cariño served as the only district bishop.

Two years later, Pope John Paul II signed his Papal Bull, Deus Caritas, decreeing the establishment of a new diocese comprising Pasig, Pateros, and Taguig. The parish was designated to be the cathedral and seat of the Bishop of Pasig. Francisco San Diego became the founding bishop of the diocese on August 21, 2003. Gabriel became its first rector. After Gabriel resigned some weeks after, San Diego named the Vicar-General, Rodolfo Gallardo, as the new rector of the cathedral. Gallardo was installed rector. During his short stint as rector, he mobilized the church's PPCRV awareness campaign for the May 2004 national presidential elections and started the Simbamahalaan encounter between parish lay leaders and LGU leaders and workers of Pasig Hall. Upon his retirement in February 2005, San Diego took over as acting parish priest and rector.

In June 2005, Roy Rosales was named fourth rector of the cathedral. He spearheaded the restoration of most of the cathedral's artifacts, like the image of Our Lady of the Apocalypse, the baptistery, the cathedral facade, the processional image of Our Lady of the Immaculate Conception, the retablos and the original image of the Our Lady of the Immaculate Conception, patroness of Pasig. It was also through the efforts of Rosales that the Immaculate Conception Cathedral-Parish witnessed the Solemn Canonical Coronation of its patron as Our Lady of the Immaculate Conception of Pasig on December 7, 2008. The celebration was led by the Apostolic Nuncio to the Philippines, Edward Joseph Adams, the Bishop of Pasig, and the entire faithful in the diocese.

In May 2010, Orlando Cantillon was named fifth rector of the cathedral. In February 2015, Bishop Mylo Hubert Vergara named Joselito I. Jopson, parish priest of Santo Rosario de Pasig Parish, as the sixth rector and eighth Filipino parish priest of the cathedral. In February 2021, Mariano L. Baranda was named the new rector and parish priest.

In February 2021, as part of the Celebration of the 500th Year Anniversary of the Arrival of Christianity in the Philippines, the Cathedral-Parish was named as a Jubilee Church in the Diocese of Pasig along with the Diocesan Shrine of St. Martha and Parish of St. Roch in Pateros and the Minor Basilica and Archdiocesan Shrine Parish of St. Anne in Taguig.

On March 25, 2022, the seven year-long restoration and renovation of the cathedral (including the addition of ceiling paintings) concluded with a grand inauguration and blessing officiated by Bishop Mylo Hubert Vergara. The restoration and renovation was done under the Abang Lingkod ni Maria under the supervision of Camarera Mayor Wilfrieda Legaspi.

== Image of La Inmaculada Concepción de Pasig ==
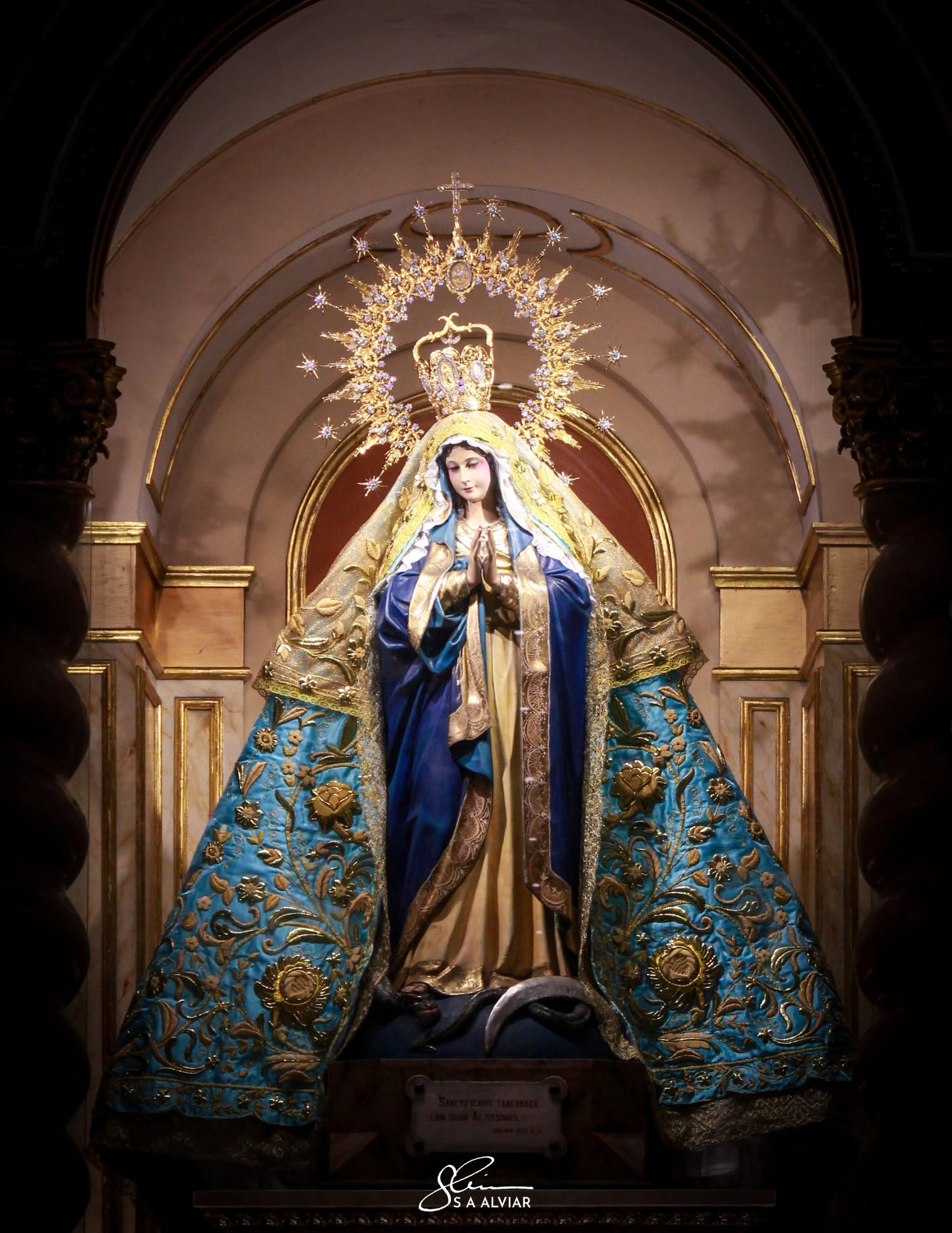
La Inmaculada Concepcion de Pasig (Solemneng Pagbibihis 2025)

Enshrined at the center of Pasig Cathedral's Retablo Mayor is a striking depiction of La Inmaculada Concepción de Pasig. Departing from the traditional Bartolomé Esteban Murillo style of loose hair and a blue-and-white robe, Pasig’s patroness wears a golden-yellow gown paired with a blue cloak. With hands folded in prayer and eyes cast downward, she stands atop a crescent moon and a crushed dragon biting an apple, adorned with a grand cape, crown, and twelve-star halo representing her formal pontifical honors.

This Marian devotion dates back to 1573, when Augustinian friars founded the parish, officially placing it under the patronage of the Immaculate Conception in 1587. After the first statue was lost during the Philippine-American War, parish priest Fr. Patricio Calderon arranged for a replacement in the early 1900s, inspired by a design commissioned by Pope St. Pius X. Warmly welcomed at Barrio Bambang before being enthroned in the sanctuary, the image saw her shrine elevated to cathedral status upon the creation of the Diocese of Pasig in 2003.

In recognition of the Pasigueños' unwavering faith, the statue was granted a Papal Decree of Canonical Coronation by Pope Benedict XVI and was formally crowned on December 7, 2008, officiated by the then-Apostolic Nuncio to the Philippines, Archbishop Edward Joseph Adams. Following the Eucharistic Celebration, a historic procession paraded the newly crowned Patrona Coronada alongside every parish patron saint in the diocese before her solemn re-enthronement at the Cathedral's main altar. Devotees also recount signs of divine favor, most notably when art restorers reportedly heard celestial choral music filling a closed, empty room while preparing the image for coronation.

Today, stewardship of the Patrona Coronada is entrusted to Abang Lingkod ni Maria, an organization founded in 2009 to oversee her care. They established the tradition of the Rite of Solemn Vesting (Rito ng Solemneng Pagbibihis), which formally heralds the town fiesta (Pistang Bayan) prior to the novena.

To preserve her rich legacy, mementos of the canonical coronation were housed in the Museo Diocesano de Pasig, a facility renovated under Abang Lingkod ni Maria's initiative and subsequently entrusted to their management. Recognizing that holistic devotion requires ensuring her sanctuary remains in optimal condition, their mandate also led to a total renovation of the cathedral itself. Under their custodianship, devotion to La Inmaculada Concepción de Pasig continues to flourish, expressed through the monthly Besomanto (Pahalik) held every first Saturday of the month, as well as parish visitations where a replica travels to communities both within and beyond the jurisdiction of the Diocese of Pasig.

== Ecclesiastical territory ==
Previously, the Immaculate Conception Cathedral belonged to the Archdiocese of Manila; it became the seat of the Diocese of Pasig in 2003.

The Immaculate Conception Cathedral comprises nine communities divided according to the patron of the chapel in the community:

- Pamayanan ng Nuestra Senora Rosa Mystica
- Pamayanan ng San Jose
- Pamayanan ng San Felipe at Santiago
- Pamayanan ng Our Lady of Fatima
- Pamayanan ng Sta. Rosa de Lima
- Pamayanan ng Sta. Rosa - Sumilang
- Pamayanan ng San Nicolas
- Pamayanan ng Sta. Cruz
- Pamayanan ng San Isidro Labrador at San Roque

== Jurisdiction ==
The Immaculate Conception Cathedral comprises the following barangays in Pasig:

- Malinao
- San Jose
- Bambang
- Bagong Katipunan
- Santa Rosa
- Sumilang
- San Nicolas
- Santa Cruz
- Kapasigan

== Pastors ==
Below is the list of Filipino parish priests.

Name	Years of pastorship	Present assignment
Manuel Sobreviñas	1979 to 1993	Deceased
Emmanuel V. Sunga	1993 to 1997	Archdiocesan Shrine and Parish of Our Lady of Loreto (Sampaloc, Manila)
Manuel G. Gabriel	1997 to 2003	retired in the Diocese of Parañaque
Rodolfo A. Gallardo	2003 to 2005	Deceased
Francisco C. San Diego	February to June 2005	deceased
Roy M. Rosales	2005 to 2010	Parish Priest, Santo Rosario de Pasig Parish Priest Coordinator, Diocesan Commission on the Cultural Heritage of the Church Spiritual Supervisor, Abang Lingkod ni Maria
Orlando B. Cantillon	2010 to 2015	Rector and Parish Priest, Archdiocesan Shrine of St. Anne Vicar-General, Diocese of Pasig Priest Coordinator, Diocesan Council of the Laity Vicar Forane, St. Anne Vicariate
Joselito I. Jopson	2015 to 2021	Parish Priest, Our Mother of Perpetual Help Parish Priest Coordinator, Pasig Diocesan Social Communications Ministry Priest Coordinator, Diocesan Basic Ecclesial Communities Commission
Mariano L. Baranda	June 2021 to present	Moderator Curiae, Diocese of Pasig Director, Human Resources Department, Diocese of Pasig Vicar Forane, Immaculate Conception Vicariate

=== Pasig Catholic Cemetery heritage tree ===
In April 2022, Pasig's 450th founding anniversary, the Department of Environment and Natural Resources, Roman Romulo, Robert Jaworski Jr. and Pasig Cathedral's Rev. Fr. Roy Rosales, ICC, led the declaration ceremony, including the installation of a historical marker on the 100-year-old acacia as heritage tree in Pasig Catholic Cemetery, A. Luna Street-Caruncho Ave Intersection, F. Antonio, Barangay Malinao, Pasig. It is 8.6 meters by 5 meters, with 533.8 centimetres (210.2 in) circumference and 170 centimetres (67 in) diameter. Planted circa 1722 and 1760, it is a boundary marker of the new and old cemetery under the Belgian priests.

== Gallery ==
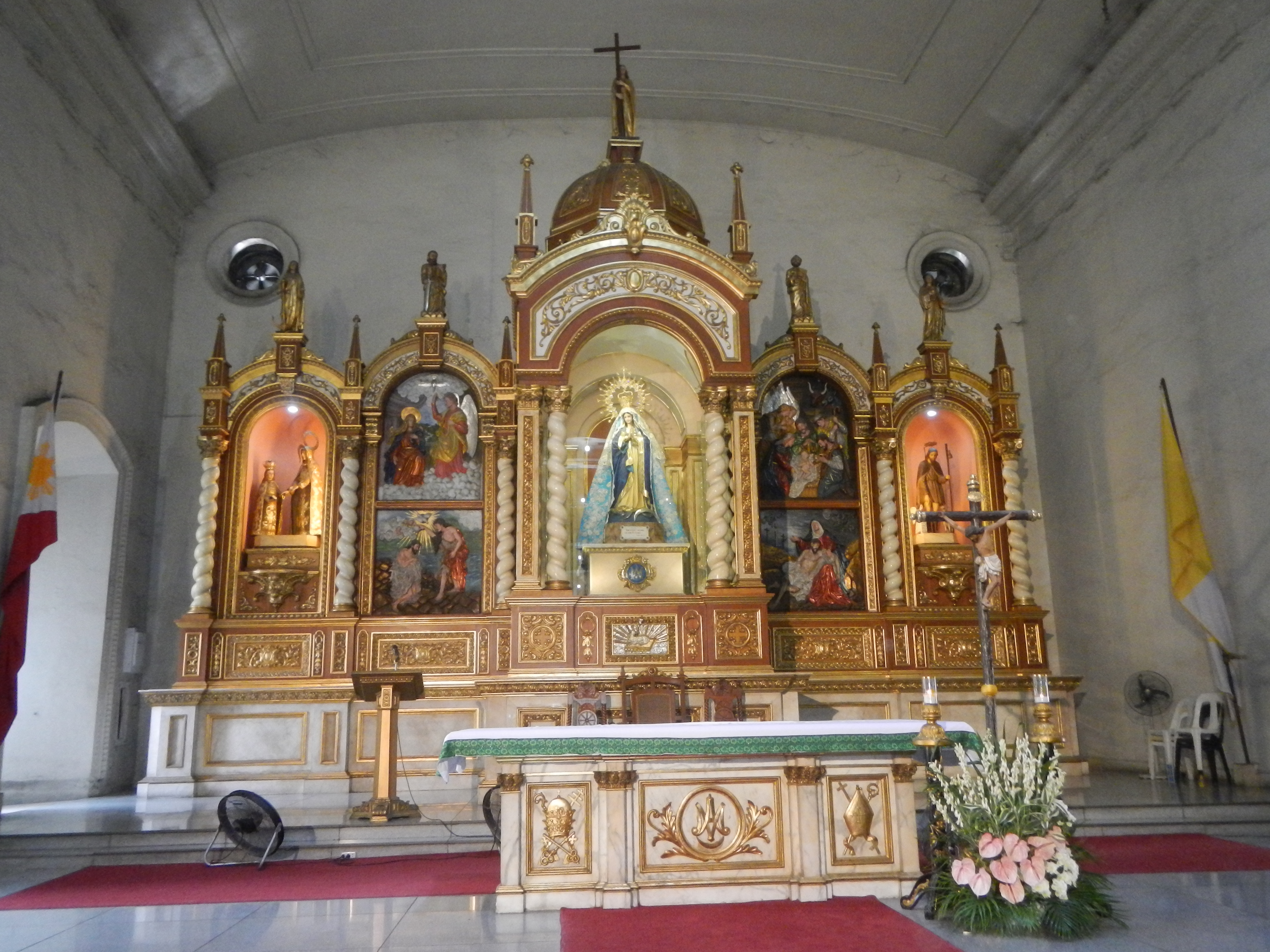
Cathedral altar and reredos

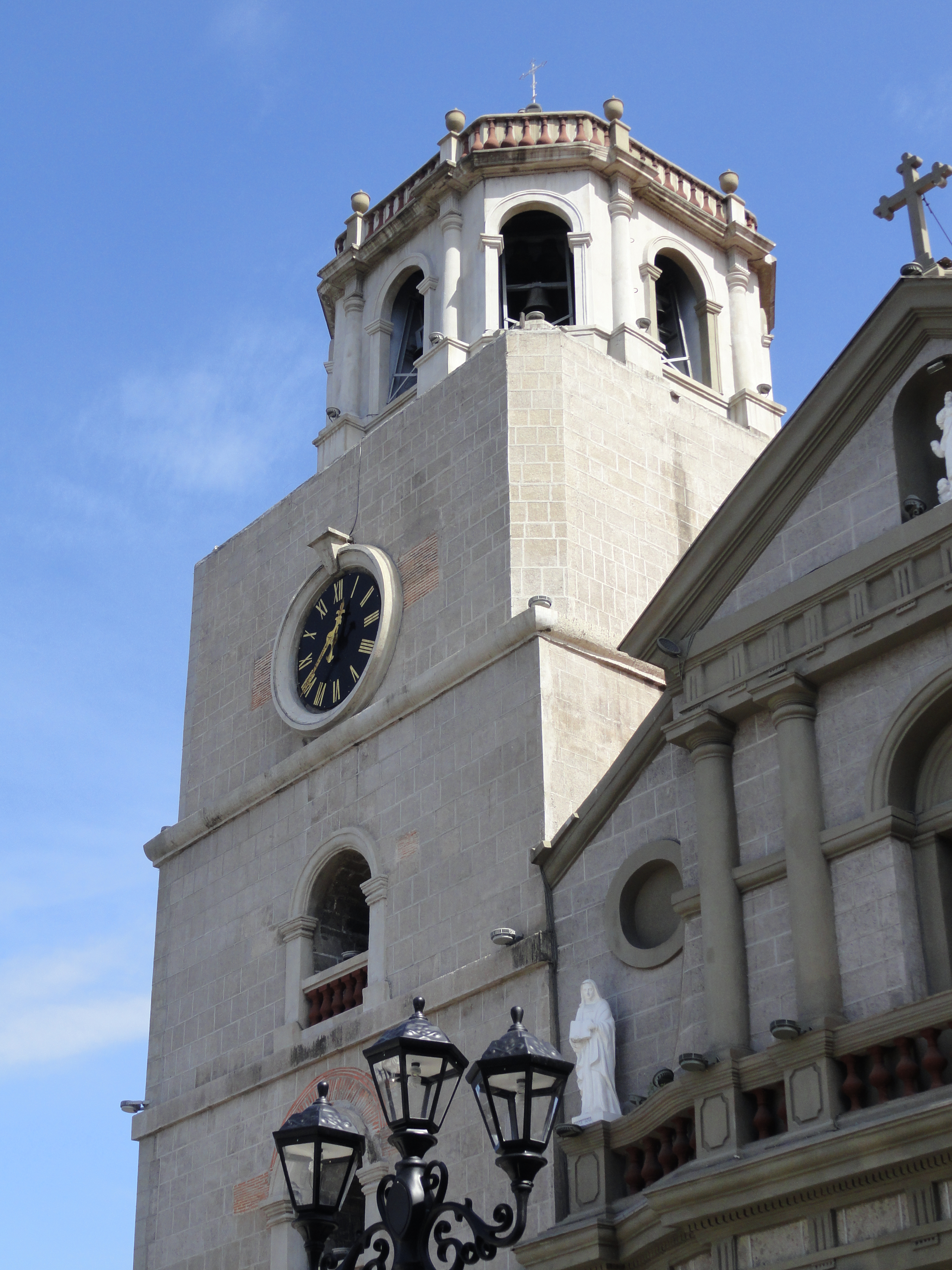
Bell tower

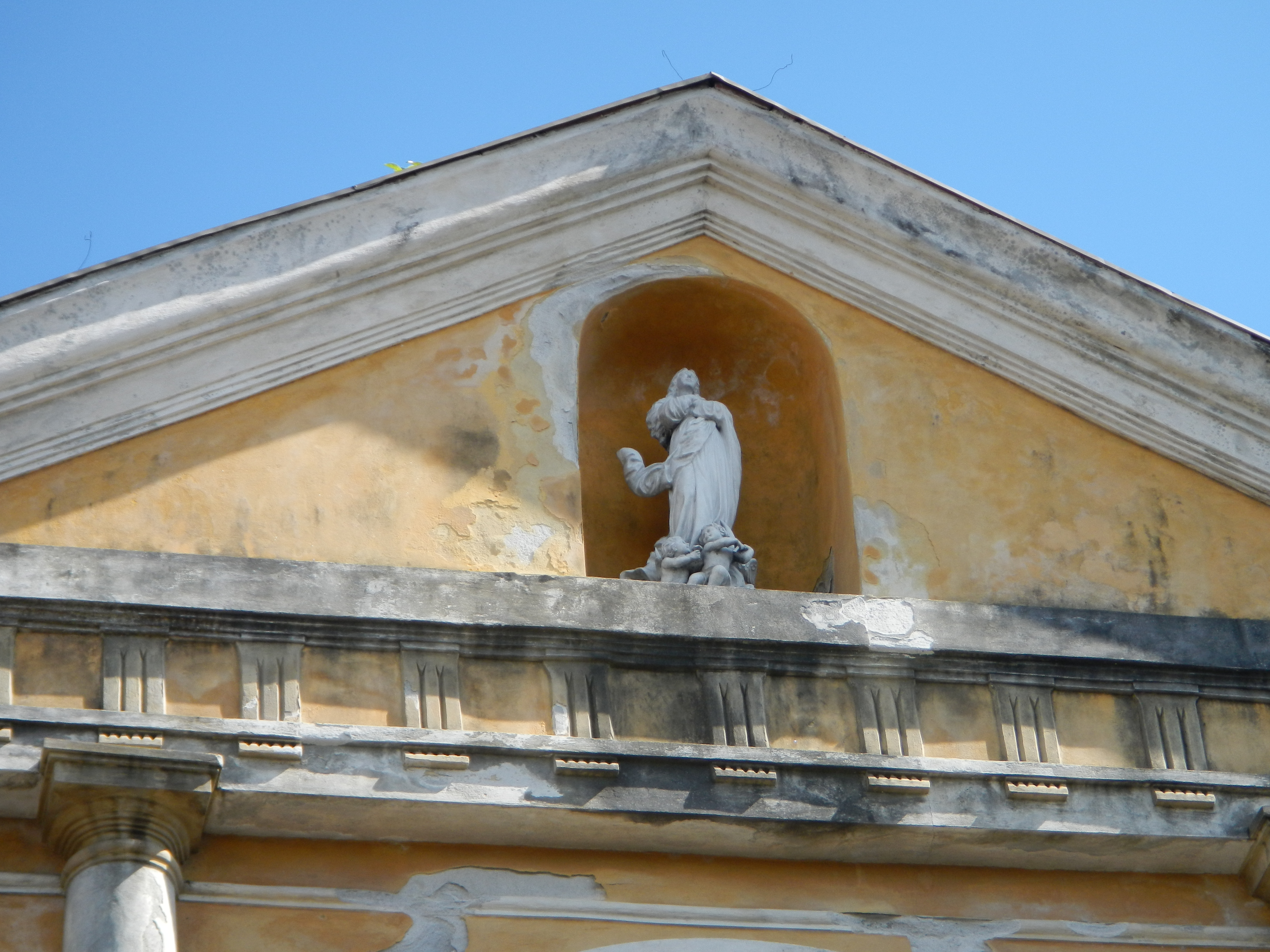
Pediment detail and niche

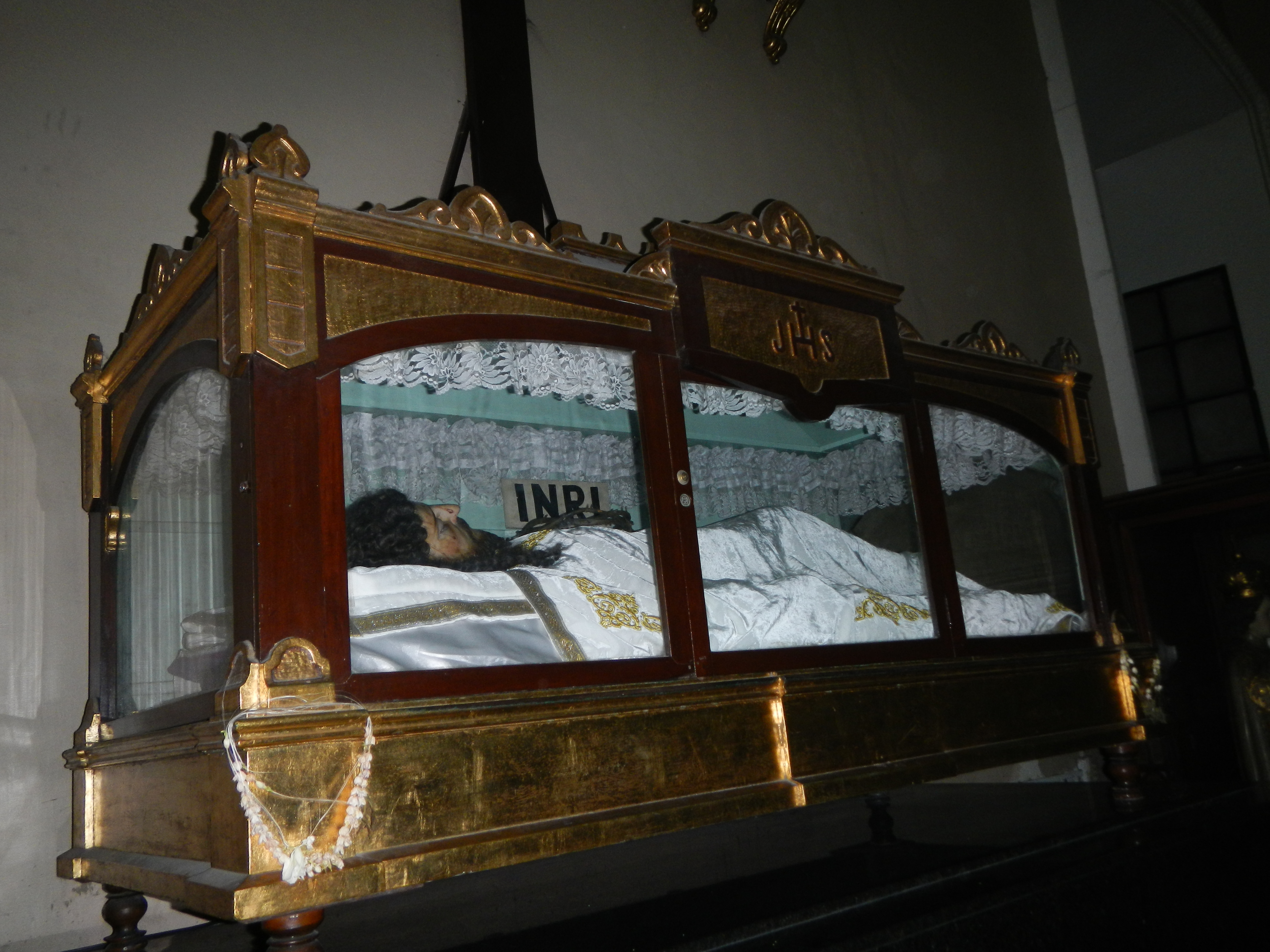
Santo Entierro

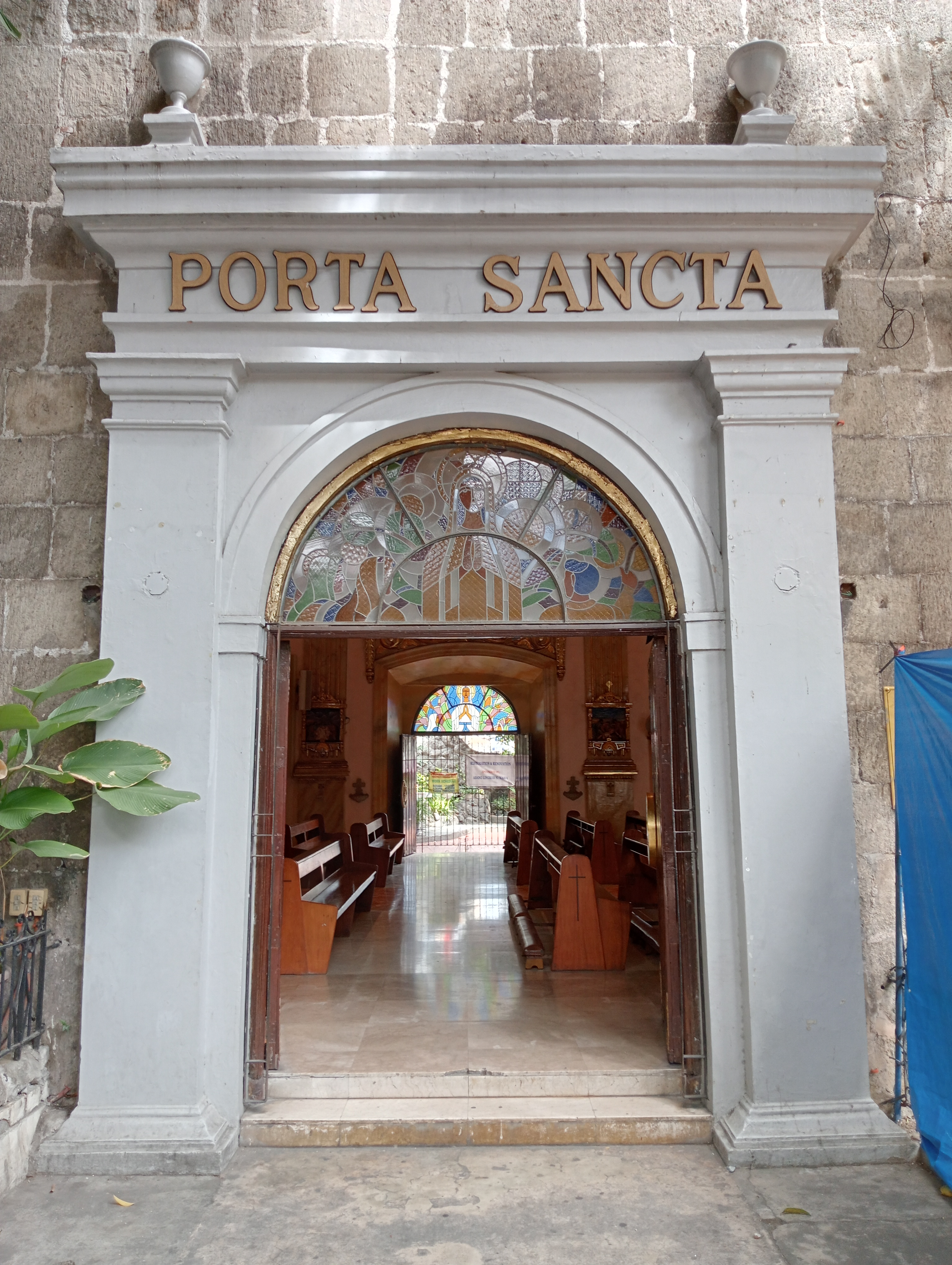
Porta Sancta

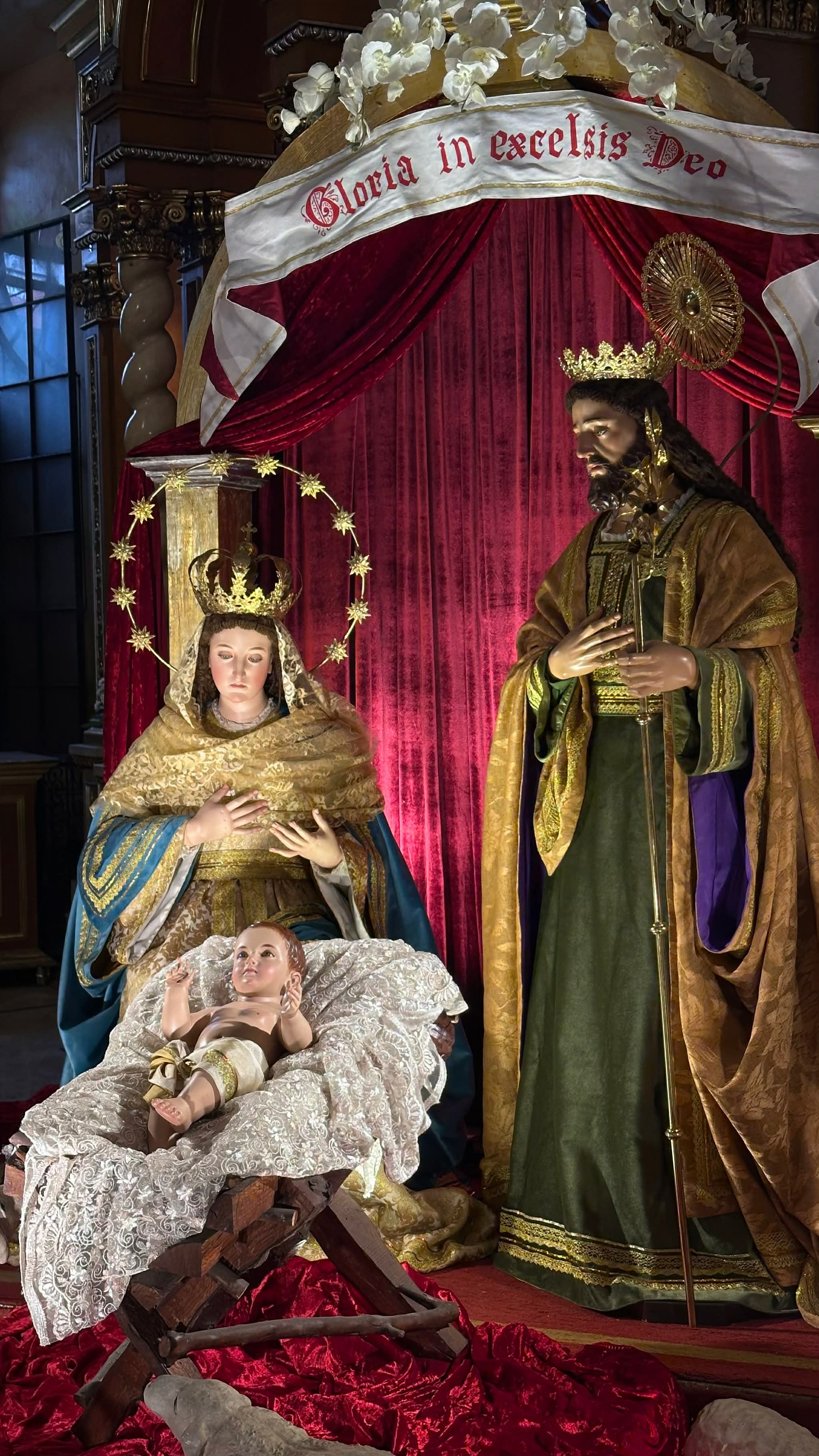
Nativity Scene

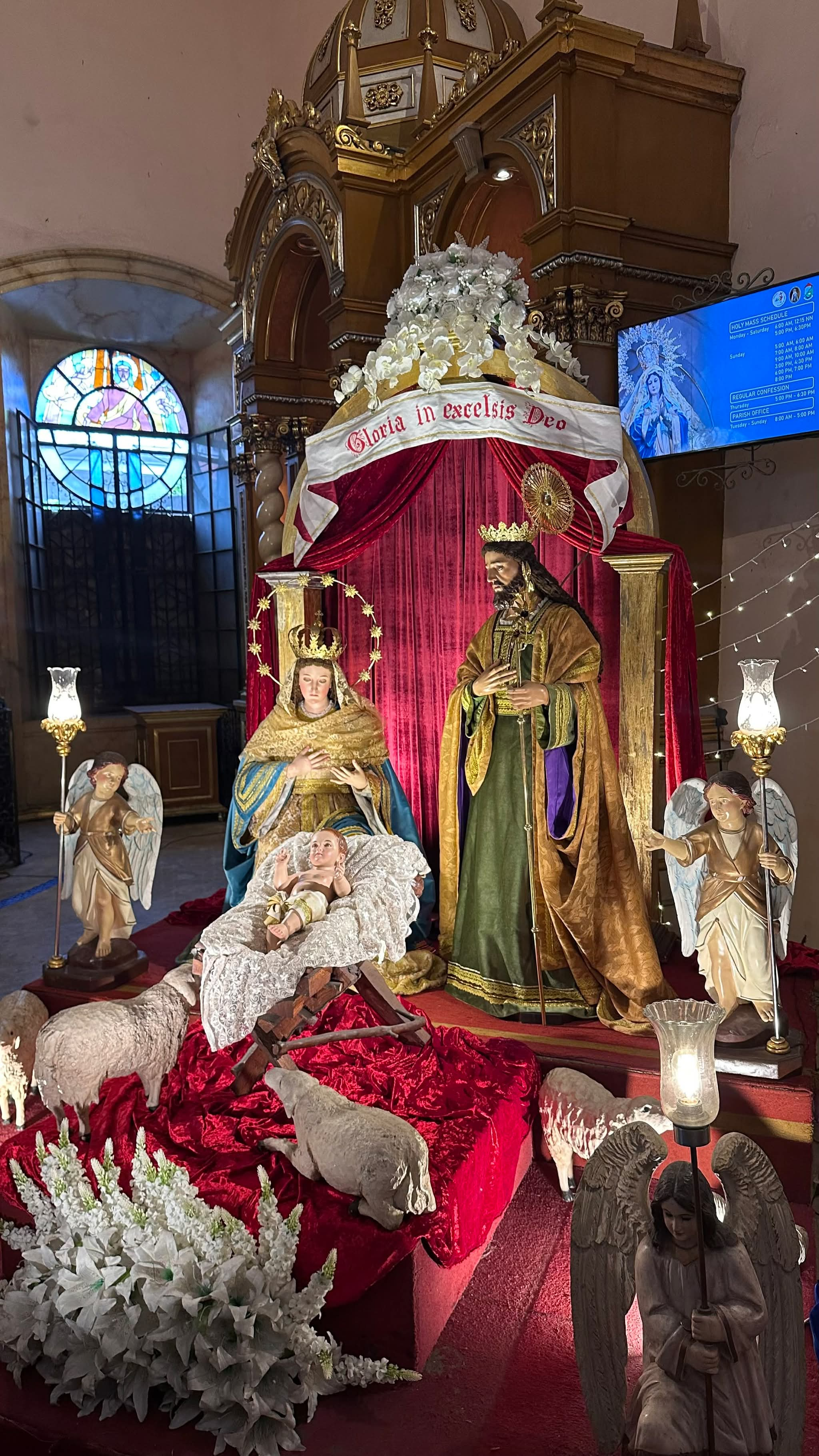
Nativity Scene #2

== See also ==
- Diocese of Pasig
- Francisco San Diego
- Archdiocese of Manila

== Resources ==
- The 2010–2011 Catholic Directory of the Philippines (published by Claretian Publications for the Catholic Bishops' Conference of the Philippines, June 2008)
- Updated Diocese of Pasig Directory
- Aviso (Notice) by the Roman Catholic Bishop of Pasig dated February 22, 2021
