= Buenaventura Famadico =

Filipino Catholic bishop (born 1956)

The Most Reverend Buenaventura Malayo Famadico D.D.
- Bishop Emeritus of San Pablo
- Province: Manila
- See: San Pablo
- Appointed: January 25, 2013
- Installed: March 2, 2013
- Retired: September 21, 2023
- Predecessor: Leo Drona
- Successor: Marcelino Antonio Maralit
- Previous posts: Bishop of Gumaca (2003–2013); Auxiliary Bishop of Lipa (2002–2003); Titular Bishop of Urusi (2002–2003)

Orders
- Ordination: October 25, 1983
- Consecration: June 19, 2002 by Antonio Franco

Personal details
- Born: Buenaventura Malayo Famadico; July 13, 1956 (age 69) Banton, Romblon, Philippines
- Denomination: Roman Catholic
- Education: St. Augustine Seminary, Calapan City; Divine Word Seminary
- Motto: Maghari Ka sa amin (Filipino for 'May You reign over us')
- Coat of arms

Styles of Buenaventura Malayo Famadico
- Reference style: His Excellency; The Most Reverend
- Spoken style: Your Excellency
- Religious style: Bishop

Buenaventura Malayo Famadico (born July 13, 1956) is a Filipino bishop of the Catholic Church who served as the fourth bishop of the Diocese of San Pablo from 2013 to 2023 and was previously the Bishop of Gumaca and Auxiliary bishop of Archdiocese of Lipa.

== Early life and education ==
Famadico was born on July 13, 1956, in Banton, Romblon. He completed his elementary education at Roxas Central School in 1969 and his secondary education at St. Augustine Seminary in Calapan in 1973. He pursued his philosophical and theological studies at Divine Word Seminary, completing them in 1977 and 1984, respectively.

== Priesthood ==
Famadico was ordained a priest for the Apostolic Vicariate of Calapan on October 25, 1983. Following his ordination, he served as Parochial Vicar at St. Joseph Parish from 1984 to 1985. He then became the Spiritual Director of St. Augustine Major Seminary from 1986 to 1991. Between 1991 and 1997, he served as Director of St. Augustine House of Spirituality and was also the Chaplain of St. Anne Chaplaincy from 1994 to 1996. From 1996 to 1997, he was the Parish Priest of Holy Spirit Parish. In 1998, he became the Parish Priest of Sto. Niño Parish in Calapan City, serving until 2002.

== Episcopal ministry ==
On April 6, 2002, he was appointed as the Auxiliary Bishop of Lipa and was consecrated on June 19, 2002, by Archbishop Antonio Franco.

On June 11, 2003 he was appointed as the second bishop of Gumaca. He was installed as Bishop of Gumaca on July 14, 2003, at San Diego de Alcala Cathedral. His appointment was seen as a response to the clergy’s desire for a young, dynamic bishop who could lead them in building a participatory Church of the poor.

On January 25, 2013, he was appointed as the Bishop of San Pablo. As Bishop of San Pablo, Famadico took decisive steps to address clergy misconduct by establishing the Office for the Reception of Reports Pertaining to Sexual Abuse by Clergy and Religious. This initiative was partly in response to Pope Francis’ 2019 document Vos estis lux mundi, which set new procedural norms for handling sexual abuse cases in the Church. Famadico emphasized that the diocese was committed to ensuring strict confidentiality and encouraging victims to report crimes without fear. He acknowledged the painful reality that some clergy members had caused scandal and despair, vowing to uphold accountability in line with papal directives.

On September 21, 2023, Pope Francis accepted his resignation for health reasons, and appointed Mylo Hubert Vergara, Bishop of Pasig, as the apostolic administrator of the diocese. Marcelino Antonio Maralit, Bishop of Boac, was named as Famadico's successor in 2024.

Catholic Church titles
Preceded by José María Libório Camino Saracho	— TITULAR — Bishop of Urusi; June 19, 2002 – June 11, 2003	Succeeded by Julian Porteous
Preceded by Emilio Z. Marquez	Bishop of Gumaca; July 14, 2003 – January 25, 2013	Succeeded by Victor Ocampo
Preceded by Leo M. Drona	Bishop of San Pablo; March 2, 2013 – September 21, 2023	Succeeded by Marcelino Antonio Maralit
