= Marcelino Antonio Maralit =

21st-century Bishop of San Pablo

His Excellency, The Most Reverend Marcelino Antonio Maralit, Jr. D.D.
- Bishop of San Pablo
- Church: Catholic Church
- Province: Manila
- See: San Pablo
- Appointed: September 21, 2024
- Installed: November 21, 2024
- Predecessor: Buenaventura Famadico
- Other posts: Chairman, Episcopal Commission on Youth, Catholic Bishops Conference of the Philippines (2025–present); Member, Dicastery for Communications (2026–present)
- Previous post: Bishop of Boac (2015–2024)

Orders
- Ordination: March 13, 1995
- Consecration: March 13, 2015 by Gaudencio Cardinal Rosales

Personal details
- Born: Marcelino Antonio Malabanan Maralit, Jr. May 18, 1969 (age 57) Manila, Philippines
- Denomination: Roman Catholic
- Education: Saint Francis de Sales Minor Seminary, Lipa, Batangas
- Motto: Fiat Mihi Secundum Verbum Tuum (Be it done unto me according to thy word, Luke 1:38)
- Coat of arms

Ordination history
History
Priestly ordination
- Ordained by: Gaudencio Rosales
- Date: March 13, 1995
- Place: San Sebastian Cathedral, Lipa City
Episcopal consecration
- Principal consecrator: Gaudencio Rosales
- Co-consecrators: Luis Antonio Tagle; Ramon Arguelles; Giuseppe Pinto
- Date: March 13, 2015
- Place: San Sebastian Cathedral, Lipa City
- Styles
- Reference style: His Excellency; The Most Reverend
- Spoken style: Your Excellency
- Religious style: Bishop

Marcelino Antonio "Junie" Malabanan Maralit, Jr. (born May 18, 1969) is a Filipino prelate who currently serves as the bishop of the Roman Catholic Diocese of San Pablo since November 21, 2024.

== Education ==
Maralit attended Canossa Academy for his primary elementary education from 1976 to 1979, and then transferred to De La Salle Lipa for his intermediate elementary education from 1979 to 1981. He attended St. Francis de Sales Minor Seminary in Lipa, Batangas for his high school education from 1981 to 1985.

Following high school, he pursued a degree in Philosophy at St. Francis de Sales Major Seminary in Lipa from 1985 to 1989. He then continued his studies in Sacred Theology at the Universidad de Navarra in Pamplona, Spain, from 1989 to 1994. He furthered his education with postgraduate studies, focusing on Licentiate and Doctorate courses in Ecclesiastical History at Pontifical University of the Holy Cross in Rome, Italy, from 1999 to 2003.

== Priesthood ==
Maralit was ordained to the priesthood on March 13, 1995 at the Roman Catholic Archdiocese of Lipa. He first served as parochial vicar of the Immaculate Conception Parish Church in Bauan, Batangas from 1995 to 1996 and concurrently as a professor at St. Francis de Sales Major Seminary in Lipa until 1999. He became Assistant Director of Archdiocesan Commission on Vocation from 1996 to 1998, and Director from 1998 to 1999. From 2003 to 2009, he served as a professor, priest, formator, vice chancellor, and Dean of Studies at St. Francis de Sales Theological Seminary, where he also chaired the Construction Committee from 2006 onwards. He became the Rector of the seminary in 2009, serving until 2013. He then served as parochial vicar of the Parish of Santo Niño de Lipa in Barangay Marawoy, Lipa, from 2011 to 2013. In 2013, he became the parish priest of Invención de la Santa Cruz Parish in Alitagtag, Batangas, and was appointed member of the Council of Priests of the Archdiocese of Lipa.

== Episcopate ==
Maralit was eventually appointed as Bishop of Boac on December 31, 2014. On March 13, 2015, he was ordained a bishop by Cardinal Gaudencio Rosales, Archbishop Emeritus of Manila, at San Sebastián Cathedral in Lipa, coinciding with his 20th sacerdotal anniversary. He was installed as Bishop of Boac on March 17, 2015, succeeding Reynaldo Evangelista, who was appointed the Bishop of Imus.

On September 21, 2024, Pope Francis appointed him as the fifth Bishop of San Pablo, succeeding Buenaventura Famadico, who had resigned exactly a year prior for health reasons. His canonical installation was held on November 21, 2024 at the Saint Paul the First Hermit Cathedral, presided over by Archbishop of Manila Cardinal José Advincula, and Mylo Hubert Vergara, the Bishop of Pasig and Apostolic Administrator of San Pablo.

On April 9, 2026, Pope Leo XIV appointed Maralit as a member of the Vatican Dicastery for Communication.

Catholic Church titles
Preceded by Reynaldo Evangelista	Bishop of Boac; March 17, 2015 – September 21, 2024	Succeeded by Edwin Panergo
Preceded by Buenaventura Famadico	Bishop of San Pablo; November 21, 2024 – present	Incumbent
