= San Pablo Cathedral (Laguna) =

Roman Catholic church in Laguna, Philippines

- Cathedral Parish of Saint Paul the First Hermit
- Katedral at Parokya ni San Pablo Unang Ermitanyo (Filipino); Catedral Parroquia de San Pablo el Primer Ermitaño (Spanish)
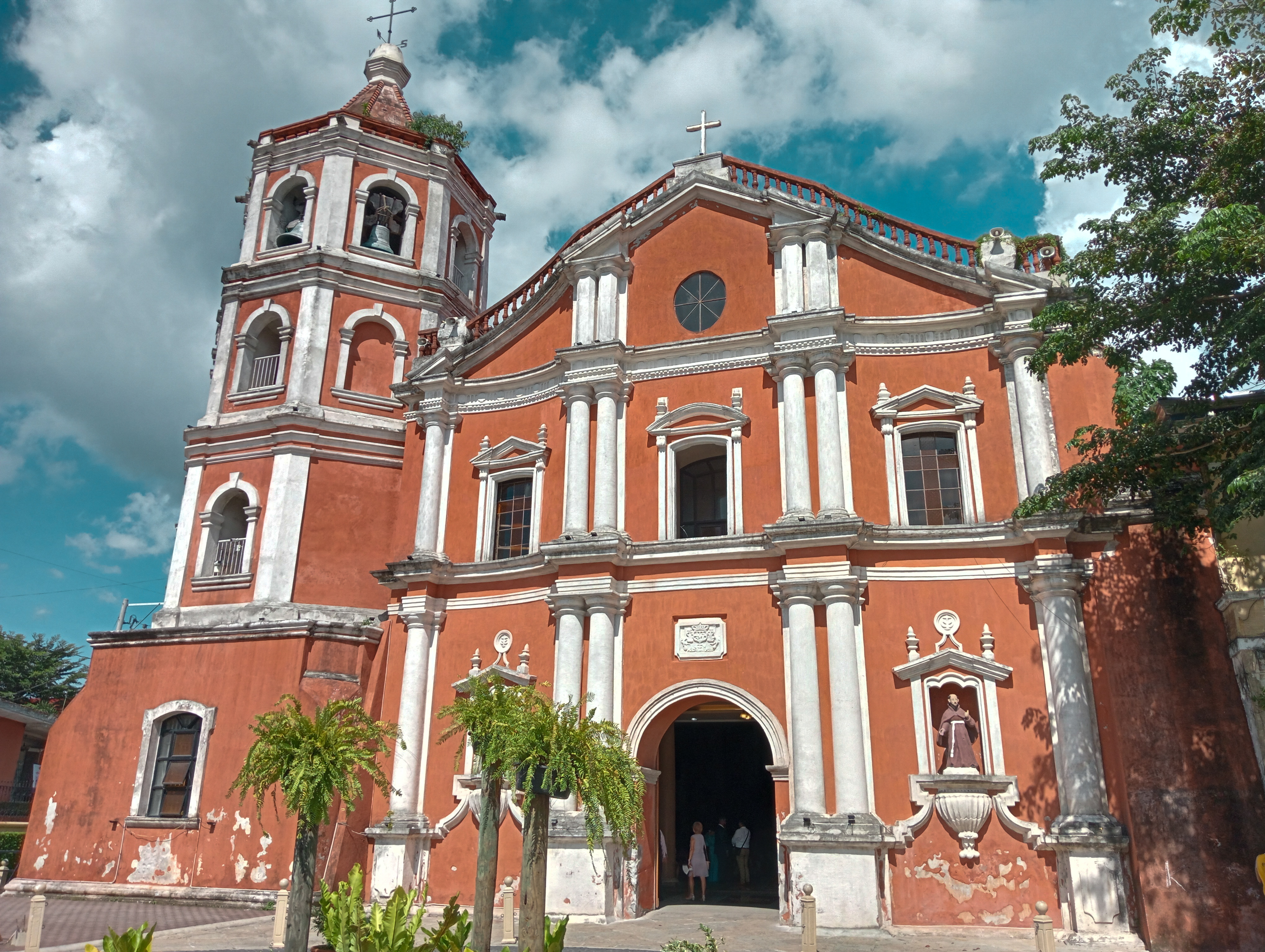
- Restored cathedral façade in 2023

- Location in Laguna Location in Luzon Location in the Philippines
- 14°04′11″N 121°19′36″E
- Location: San Pablo City
- Country: Philippines
- Denomination: Roman Catholic

History
- Status: Cathedral
- Founded: 1586
- Dedication: St. Paul the First Hermit

Architecture
- Functional status: Active
- Architectural type: Church building
- Style: Baroque
- Groundbreaking: 1714

Specifications
- Materials: Adobe, bricks and other native material

Administration
- Province: Manila
- Metropolis: Manila
- Archdiocese: Manila
- Diocese: San Pablo
- Deanery: St. Paul the First Hermit

Clergy
- Archbishop: Jose Advincula
- Bishop: Marcelino Antonio Maralit, Jr.
- Rector: Jerry Bitoon

The Cathedral Parish of Saint Paul the First Hermit, commonly known as San Pablo Cathedral, is the see of the bishop of the Roman Catholic Diocese of San Pablo located in San Pablo City, Philippines. Its titular is Saint Paul the First Hermit and its feast is celebrated every January 15.

== History ==
=== 16th to 18th centuries ===
Spanish captain Juan de Salcedo first arrived in the upland village of Sampaloc in 1571. The area's name was officially changed to San Pablo de los Montes in 1586, in honor of Paul the First Hermit. That same year, San Pablo became an independent parish, and the first church made of wood was constructed under the auspices of Augustinian priest Mateo Mendoza.

From 1618 to 1629, a second church was constructed from stone by Hernando Cabrera. In 1680 Juan Labo laid the foundations for the current church. This building was started in 1714 and completed in 1721 by Francisco Juan de Elorreaga. The Franciscans later administered the parish of San Pablo (which was then part of the province of Batangas) on April 4, 1794, with Andres Cabrera as parish priest. Cabrera added the brick-stone wall and built a stone cemetery in 1796.

=== 19th century ===
Renovations on the church building and the convent were conducted from 1839 to 1858 under the auspices of Peregrin Prosper. Eugenio Garcia, Francisco Vellon, and Santiago Bravo added the transept from 1871 to 1877, 1878 to 1884, and 1884 to 1888, respectively. In 1898 administration was transferred to the secular priests, with Francisco Alcantara as the first parish priest from the seculars.

=== 20th century ===
The convent housed the Minor Seminary of St. Francis of Sales of the Congregation of the Mission (also known as Padre Paules) from 1912 to 1939. The church was used by the occupying Japanese forces as a military prison and garrison during World War II; the convent was heavily damaged during the liberation of the Philippines in 1945. With the help of the parishioners, the church was rebuilt from 1948 to 1954 under the supervision of Juan Coronel and Nicomedes Rosal.

The parish church of San Pablo became a cathedral with the establishment of the Roman Catholic Diocese of San Pablo by the Apostolic Letter Ecclesianum Perempla on November 28, 1966. It was canonically erected on April 18, 1967, with Bishop Pedro N. Bantigue installed as the first bishop of San Pablo.

=== 21st century ===
In 2015, the facade of the cathedral was restored to its original design sans the concrete crown added in the American period. Damage done when a concrete porte cochere was added were repaired. Restoration was done at the end of the Diocesan 50th Jubilee.

In 2025, a pipe organ was installed to its choir loft. Built by Diego Cera Organbuilders, it consists of 1,777 pipes, with 2 accessories and 30 stops. It is currently the largest mechanical pipe organ in the Philippines. Blessing and commissioning were done during the Solemnity of the Annunciation of the Lord.

== Gallery ==
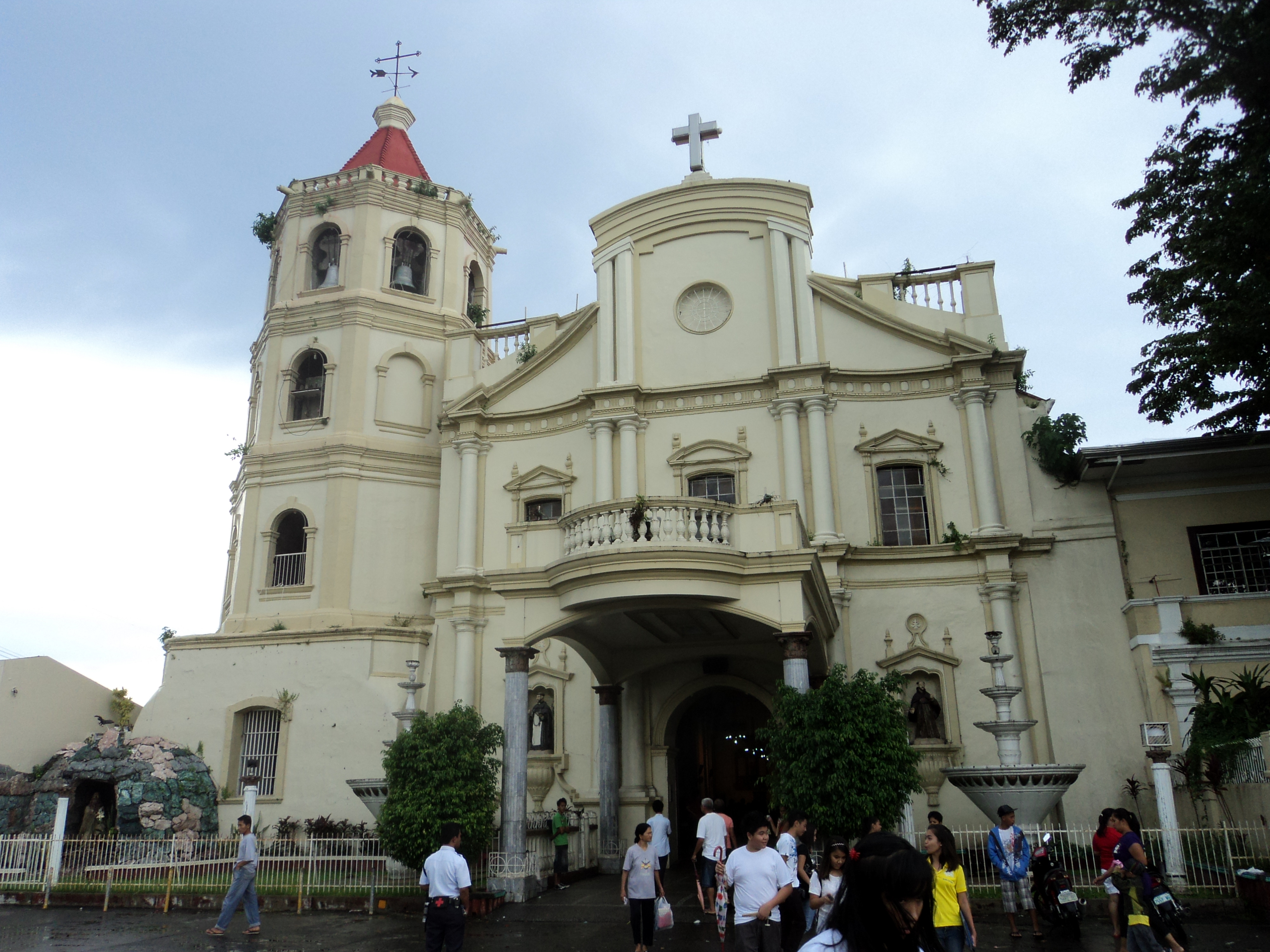
Cathedral facade prior to renovations that began in 2015, removing the concrete pediment and porte cochere added during the American period

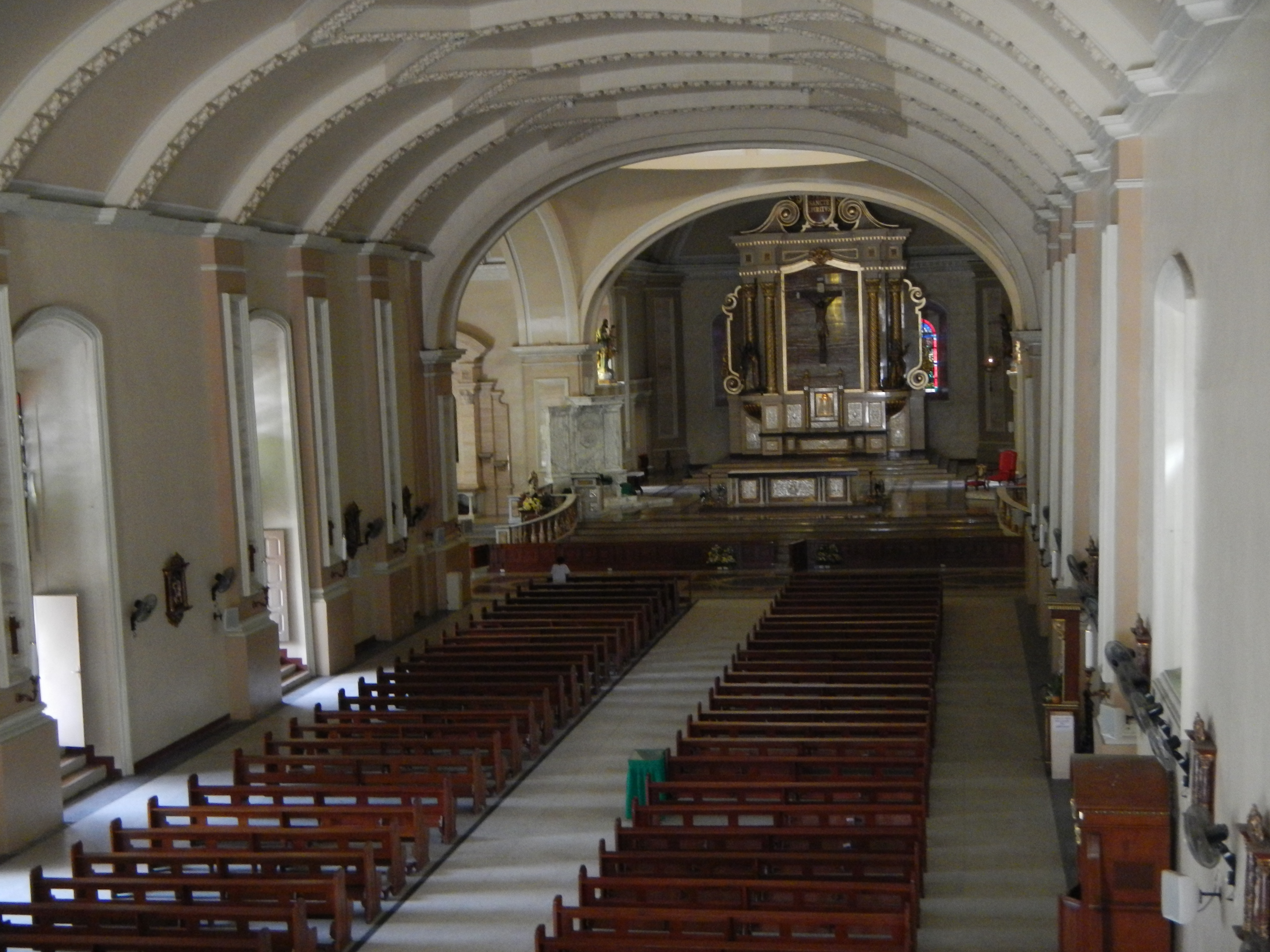
Church interior in 2013

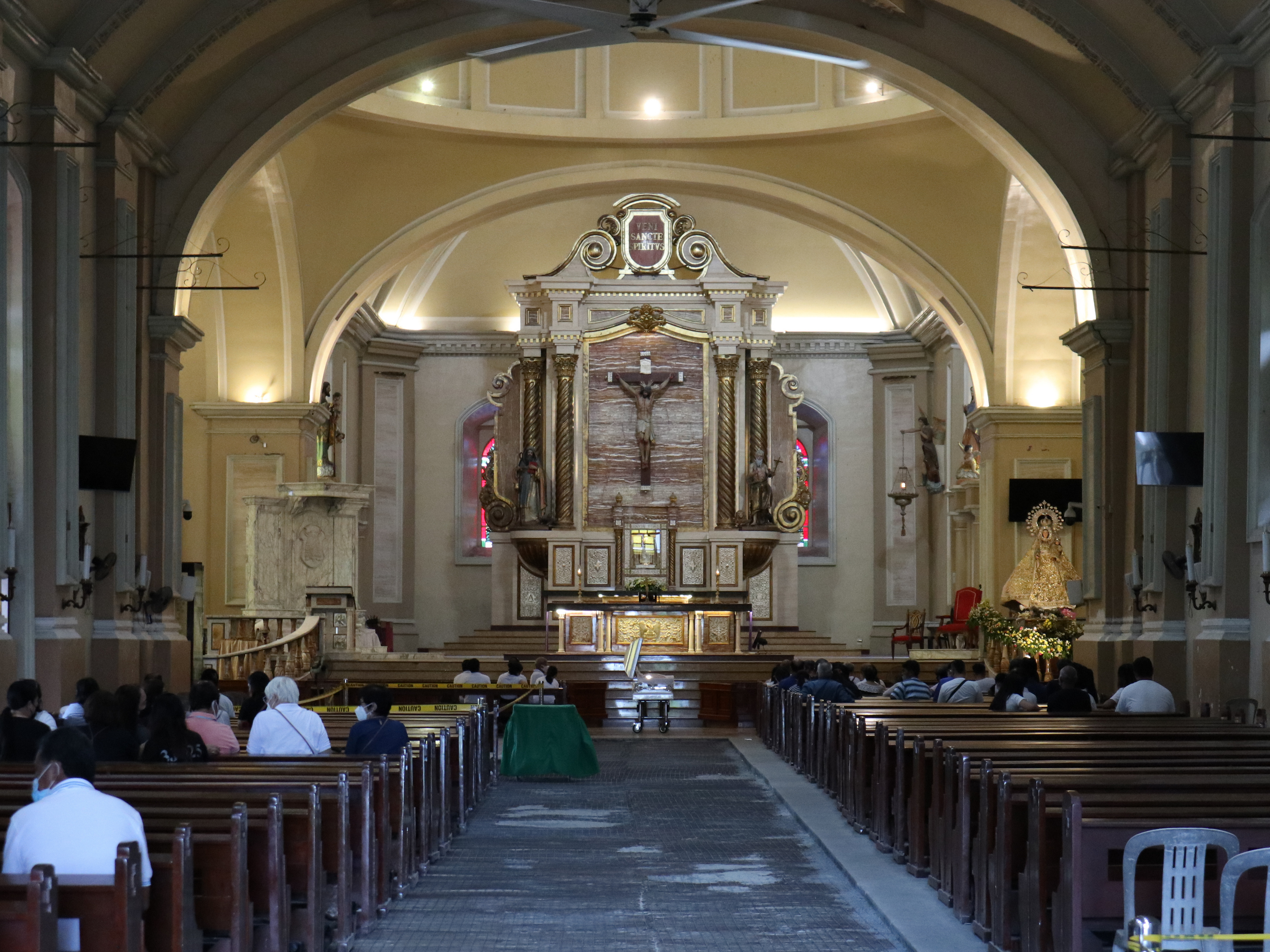
Nave facing the altar, taken in 2022

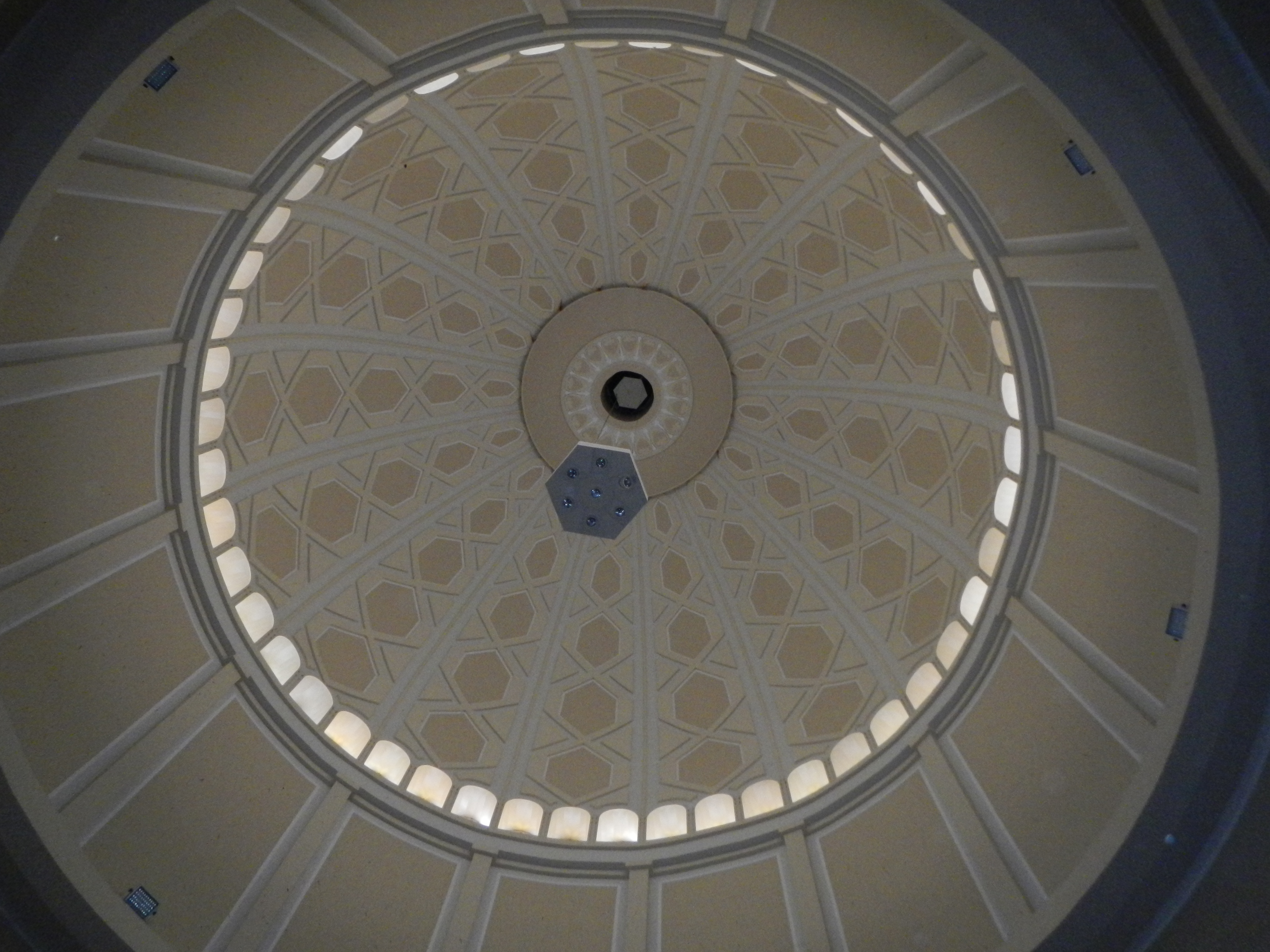
Dome interior featuring clerestories

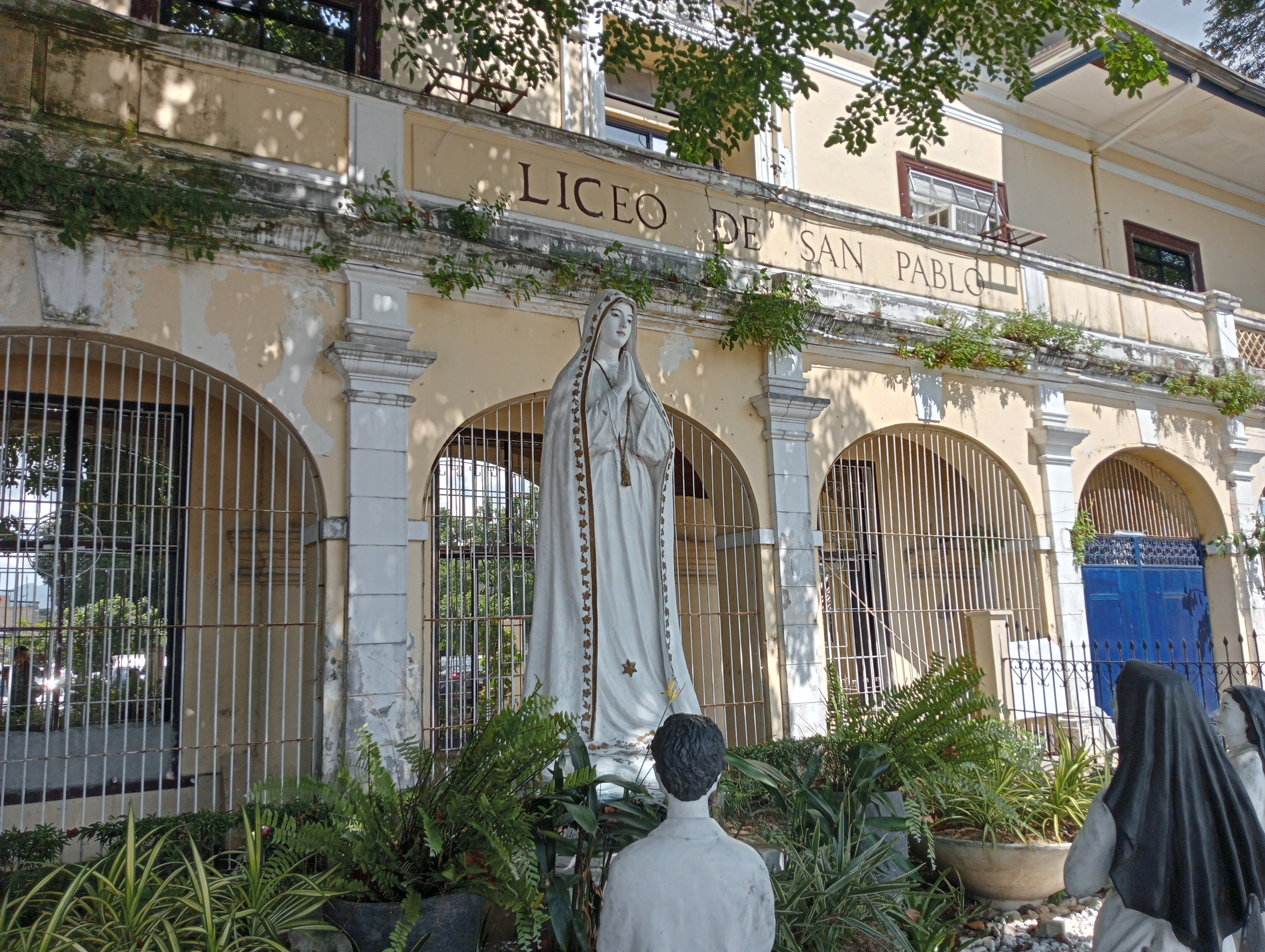
Liceo de San Pablo

== Bibliography ==
- Huerta, Felix de (1865). Estado geográfico, topográfico, estadístico, histórico-religioso [Geographical, topographical, statistical, historical and religious state] (in Spanish). Binondo: Imprenta de M. Sanchez y Ca.
- Historical Markers: Regions I-IV and CAR (in Filipino). Manila: National Historical Institute (Philippines). 1993. p. 105. ISBN 9715380611.
