= Leo M. Drona =

Filipino bishop (born 1941)

The Most Reverend Leo M. Drona SDB, D.D., STL
- Bishop Emeritus of San Pablo
- Province: Manila
- See: San Pablo (emeritus)
- Appointed: May 14, 2004
- Installed: June 18, 2004
- Retired: January 25, 2013
- Predecessor: Francisco San Diego
- Successor: Buenaventura Famadico
- Previous post: Bishop of San Jose (1987–2004)

Orders
- Ordination: December 22, 1967
- Consecration: July 25, 1987 by Bruno Torpigliani

Personal details
- Born: October 18, 1941 (age 85) Pangil, Laguna, Commonwealth of the Philippines
- Denomination: Roman Catholic
- Motto: Pro Mundi Vita ('For the life of the World', John 6:51)

Ordination history
History
Episcopal consecration
- Principal consecrator: Bruno Torpigliani
- Co-consecrators: Gabriel V. Reyes; Pedro Bantigue y Natividad
- Styles
- Reference style: His Excellency; The Most Reverend
- Spoken style: Your Excellency
- Religious style: Bishop

Leo Murphy Drona (born October 18, 1941) is the bishop emeritus of San Pablo in the Philippines. He holds the distinction as one of the first Filipino Salesian priests and the first Filipino Salesian to become a bishop.

== Biography ==
Drona was born on October 18, 1941 in Pangil, Laguna. He spent his elementary years at Thomas Earnshaw Elementary School, and spent his high school years at Don Bosco Technical Institute in Santa Ana, Manila. He spent his seminary training at Salesian Seminary College at Hong Kong, where he earned PhB. He was ordained to the priesthood on December 22, 1967.

He obtained his Licentiate of Sacred Theology in 1968 from the Universita Pontificia Salesiana in Rome. He was appointed as dean of College of Don Bosco College Seminary in Calamba, Laguna from 1968 to 1973, then was appointed as rector of the same seminary from 1974 to 1981, and then appointed as vice-provincial superior of SDB Provincial Office in Parañaque from 1981 to 1987.

On July 25, 1987, he was consecrated as bishop. He served as Bishop of San Jose, Philippines, from 1987 to 2004.

He succeeded Francisco San Diego in 2004, becoming the third bishop of the Diocese of San Pablo and the first native of Laguna to serve that post.

On January 25, 2013, Pope Benedict XVI accepted the early retirement of Drona from the pastoral duties in the Diocese of San Pablo and appointed Buenaventura Famadico as his successor.

Catholic Church titles
Preceded by Florentino Cinense	Bishop of San Jose, Nueva Ecija; July 25, 1987 – May 14, 2004	Succeeded by Mylo Hubert Vergara
Preceded by Francisco San Diego	Bishop of San Pablo; June 18, 2004 – January 25, 2013	Succeeded by Buenaventura Famadico
