= Gaudencio Rosales =

Filipino Cardinal and Archbishop Emeritus of Manila (born 1932)

His Eminence Gaudencio Rosales D.D.
- Cardinal, Archbishop Emeritus of Manila
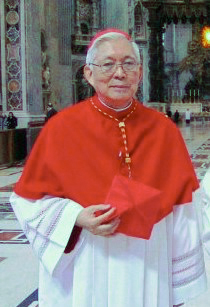
- Rosales at St. Peter's Basilica c. 2006
- Province: Manila
- See: Manila
- Appointed: September 15, 2003
- Installed: November 21, 2003
- Retired: December 12, 2011
- Predecessor: Jaime Sin
- Successor: Luis Antonio Tagle
- Other posts: Parish Priest, St. Vincent Ferrer Parish (1970–1972); Parish Priest, Immaculate Conception Parish (1972–1974); Rector, San Carlos Seminary (1980–1982); Cardinal-Priest of Santissimo Nome di Maria in Via Latina (2006–present)
- Previous posts: Auxiliary Bishop of Manila (1974–1984); Bishop of Malaybalay (1984–1992); Archbishop of Lipa (1993–2003); Apostolic Administrator of Pasig (2010–2011)

Orders
- Ordination: March 23, 1958 by Alejandro Olalia
- Consecration: October 28, 1974 by Bruno Torpigliani
- Created cardinal: March 24, 2006 by Pope Benedict XVI
- Rank: Cardinal-Priest

Personal details
- Born: August 10, 1932 (age 94) Batangas, Philippine Islands
- Denomination: Roman Catholic
- Residence: St. Francis de Sales Theology Seminary, Lipa City, Batangas
- Profession: Priesthood/Roman Catholic Cardinal-Priest
- Education: San Jose Seminary
- Motto: Si mortuum fuerit, fructum affert ('If it dies, it bears fruit.', John 12:24)
- Coat of arms: Gaudencio Rosales's coat of arms

Styles of Gaudencio B. Cardinal Rosales
- Reference style: His Eminence
- Spoken style: Your Eminence
- Religious style: Monsignor
- Informal style: Cardinal
- See: Manila (Emeritus)

Ordination history of Gaudencio Rosales
History
Priestly ordination
- Ordained by: Alejandro Ayson Olalia (Lipa)
- Date: March 23, 1958
- Place: Metropolitan Cathedral of St. Sebastian, Lipa, Batangas
Episcopal consecration
- Principal consecrator: Bruno Torpigliani (Philippines Apos. Nunc.)
- Co-consecrators: Jaime Sin (Manila); Ricardo Vidal (Lipa)
- Date: October 28, 1974
- Place: Minor Basilica of the Immaculate Conception, Batangas City
Cardinalate
- Date: March 26, 2006
Episcopal succession
Bishops consecrated by Gaudencio Rosales as principal consecrator
- Mylo Hubert Vergara: February 12, 2005
- Pablo Virgilio David: July 10, 2006
- Broderick Pabillo: August 19, 2006
- Elenito Galido: September 8, 2006
- Leopoldo Jaucian, S.V.D.: March 26, 2007
- Francisco Mendoza de Leon: September 1, 2007
- Ruperto Santos: June 25, 2010
- Marcelino Antonio Maralit: March 13, 2015
- Socrates Mesiona, M.S.P.: February 10, 2017
- Louie Galbines: May 28, 2018

Gaudencio Borbón Rosales (born August 10, 1932), also known as Lolo Dency, is a Filipino Catholic prelate who served as Archbishop of Manila, from 2003 to 2011. He was made a cardinal in 2006.

Rosales was the fourth native Filipino to hold the post. During his last year as archbishop, he was concurrently named apostolic administrator of the Diocese of Pasig from December 21, 2010 to June 23, 2011, a post he accepted after the resignation of Pasig's first bishop, Francisco San Diego. He is also the longest-lived Filipino cardinal, surpassing Cardinal Jose Tomas Sanchez.

== Early life and priestly ministry ==
Rosales was born in the then-town of Batangas, Batangas. Rosales' grandfathers were Julián Rosales, a former mayor of the town of Batangas and Pablo Borbón, a former provincial governor of Batangas. Rosales' father, Dr. Godofredo Dilay Rosales, was one of the first Filipino physicians to acquire his medical school and residency training exclusively in the United States of America, after which he returned home to practice in Batangas City. Rosales' mother, Remedios Mayo Borbón, was a first cousin of the nationalist Claro M. Recto. He is the third of seven siblings, the others being Rosie, Guillermo (deceased), Gabriel, Tessie, Gilbert and Mary Grace.

He attended his elementary education at Batangas Elementary School and St. Bridget's Grade School and his secondary education at Batangas High School. As a boy, he wanted already to become a priest. He studied theology at the San José Seminary and had as classmates two other future bishops: Bishop Severino Pelayo, later Military Ordinary of the Philippines, and Bishop Benjamin Almoneda, later Bishop of Daet. On March 23, 1958, he was ordained priest by Lipa Bishop Alejandro Olalia and then assigned to teach for 12 years at St. Francis Minor Seminary, the seminary of the Diocese of Lipa. In 1970, he was given his first parish assignment, the St. Vincent Ferrer Parish in the obscure Barangay Banay-banay in Lipa. In 1972, he was assigned as parish priest of the Immaculate Conception Parish in Batangas City.

== Bishop ==
In 1974, Rosales was named auxiliary bishop of Manila, the first Batangueño to be named such. Bishop Rosales received his crosier from Lucena Bishop Alfredo María Obviar, who was the former Vicar General of their diocese, and has used it ever since. He took care of the ecclesiastical district of East Antipolo in Rizal from until 1980 and later the ecclesiastical district of Manila South from 1980 to 1982. He was also appointed rector of the archdiocesan major seminary, San Carlos Seminary. On June 9, 1982, he was named coadjutor bishop of Malaybalay in Bukidnon and was later canonically installed as its second bishop on September 14, 1984, after the resignation of Bishop Francisco F. Claver.

== Archbishop of Lipa and of Manila ==
When Archbishop Mariano Gaviola of Lipa retired, Rosales was appointed his successor on December 30, 1992, bringing the latter back to the diocese where he began his ministry. With the announced retirement of Cardinal Jaime Sin, Rosales was named archbishop of Manila by Pope John Paul II on September 15, 2003. He was installed on November 21, 2003.

== Cardinal ==
Rosales's elevation to the College of Cardinals was announced on February 22, 2006. Archbishop Antonio Franco, the Apostolic Nuncio, personally made the announcement at Manila Cathedral during a Mass for the 40th anniversary of the Focolare Movement.

Pope Benedict XVI created Rosales cardinal-priest of Santissimo Nome di Maria in Via Latina in the consistory of March 24, 2006. Rosales joined 14 others, two of them Asians, as the newest members of the College of Cardinals. Pope Benedict told the new cardinals, "I want to sum up the meaning of this new call that you have received in the word which I placed at the heart of my first Encyclical: caritas. This matches well the color of your cardinal's robes. May the scarlet that you now wear always express the caritas Christi, inspiring you to a passionate love for Christ, for his Church and for all humanity." A little later, Benedict added, "I am counting on you, dear Brother Cardinals, to ensure that the principle of love will spread far and wide, and will give new life to the Church at every level of her hierarchy, in every group of the faithful, in every religious institute, in every spiritual, apostolic or humanitarian initiative."

On February 3, 2007, Rosales was appointed for a five-year term on the 15-member Council of Cardinals for the Study of Organizational and Economic Concerns of the Apostolic See. In 2008, Cardinal Rosales offered his resignation from the governance of the archdiocese, as required under canon law on reaching the age of 75, but Cardinal Giovanni Battista Re communicated that the Holy See had not accepted it. In the same year also, Cardinal Rosales invited Pope Benedict XVI to visit the Philippines, being the third largest Catholic nation in the world; however, the pope declined due to heavy schedule.

Four months after his 79th birthday, Rosales resigned as Archbishop of Manila and he was succeeded by the then-Bishop of Imus, Luis Antonio Tagle upon the latter's installation on December 12, 2011. On August 10, 2012, along with the celebration of his 80th birthday, he lost his eligibility to vote on any future conclaves and thus, did not participate in the 2013 conclave that elected Pope Francis, nor in the 2025 conclave that elected Pope Pope Leo XIV.

On August 10, 2024, with the celebration of his 92nd birthday, he became the longest living Filipino Cardinal, surpassing José Tomás Sánchez. On October 28, Rosales celebrated his 50th episcopal anniversary at the Saint Francis de Sales Major Seminary (Marawoy, Lipa City, Batangas) – Major (College) Seminary of the Archdiocese of Lipa, as Asia’s third oldest cardinal. The oldest is Cardinal Michael Michai Kitbunchu followed by Cardinal Joseph Zen.

Rosales was recognized by the Archdiocese of Manila for his milestones as a priest, bishop, and cardinal. In 2018, he celebrated his 60th anniversary as a priest. In 2024, he celebrated his 50th anniversary as a bishop. In 2026, serving as priest for 68 years, as a bishop for 52 years, and as a cardinal for 20 years, he received a special recognition from the Archbishop of Manila, Cardinal Jose Advincula, during the Chrism Mass held at the Manila Cathedral on Holy Thursday, April 2, 2026.

== Views ==
=== Government ===
Archbishop Rosales expressed support for charter change but condemned politicians pushing their personal agenda in amending the constitution. When the state of national emergency was proclaimed, he would ask Filipinos to pray for peace and unity in the country and expressed hopes that the government will not abuse and curtail the rights of the people.

=== National Statistics Office ===
In 2007, Cardinal Rosales argued against the National Statistics Office (NSO) requirement that all solemnizing officers/priests undergo training before conducting wedding ceremonies. He said: "We understand the concern of the National Statistics Office (NSO) because we also know of abuses done by the so-called ministers of the Gospel (not priests), but they should not be like that to us, as if we know nothing."

=== Gay parades ===
In 2008, Rosales clashed with Ang Ladlad founder Danton Remoto on the subject of allowing gays to participate, in drag, in the Flores de Mayo celebration. Rosales threatened parishes that permit cross-dressing homosexuals to play Saint Helena or female saints in the Santacruzan or Flores de Mayo procession with official punishment and removal from Mass.

=== Implementing Summorum Pontificum ===
The guidelines that Rosales wrote for implementing the 2007 motu proprio Summorum Pontificum were reported to have been criticized by Darío Castrillón Hoyos, President of the Ecclesia Dei Commission, as too restrictive. Rosales denied that he had forbidden use of the "Traditional Latin Mass" in his archdiocese, saying he had only opposed celebration by priests of the dissident Society of St. Pius X.

=== Abortion ===
On September 16, 2010, Cardinal Rosales issued a pastoral letter expressing the Catholic Church’s condemnation of abortion and recalling the excommunication imposed by the Church on those who procure it or help others to do so. "A deliberately procured abortion is a moral evil and the Catholic Church attaches the canonical penalty of excommunication on those who procure it and on those who help obtain abortion", the pastoral letter read.

== Auxiliary bishops ==
Below is the list of auxiliary bishops who served during Rosales' term as Archbishop of Manila. The auxiliary bishops are also Vicars-General of the archdiocese.

- Socrates Villegas (2003–2004) (later installed as Bishop of Balanga)
- Bernardino Cortez (2004–2014) (later installed as Bishop-Prelate of Infanta in 2014)
- Broderick Soncuaco Pabillo (2006–2011) (later installed as Apostolic Vicar of Taytay in 2021)

== Vicars-general ==
Aside from the auxiliary bishops, the following priests served as vicars-general of Manila during Rosales' time.

- Josefino Ramirez (2003–2010)
- Francisco Tantoco (2004–2011)

Catholic Church titles
Preceded by Protacio Gungon	Rector of San Carlos Seminary; 1980–1982	Succeeded by Ramon Arguelles
Preceded by Francisco F. Claver	Bishop of Malaybalay; September 14, 1984 – December 30, 1992	Succeeded by Honesto Chaves Pacana, SJ
Preceded by Mariano Gaviola y Garcés	Archbishop of Lipa; March 19, 1993 – September 15, 2003	Succeeded by Ramon Arguelles
Preceded by Jaime Sin	Archbishop of Manila; November 21, 2003 – December 12, 2011	Succeeded by Luis Antonio Tagle
Vacant Title last held by Paulos Tzadua	Cardinal-Priest of SS. Nome di Maria in Via Latina; March 24, 2006 – present	Incumbent
