= Mylo Hubert Vergara =

Filipino bishop of the Catholic Church (born 1962)

The Most Reverend Mylo Hubert Vergara DD
- Bishop of Pasig
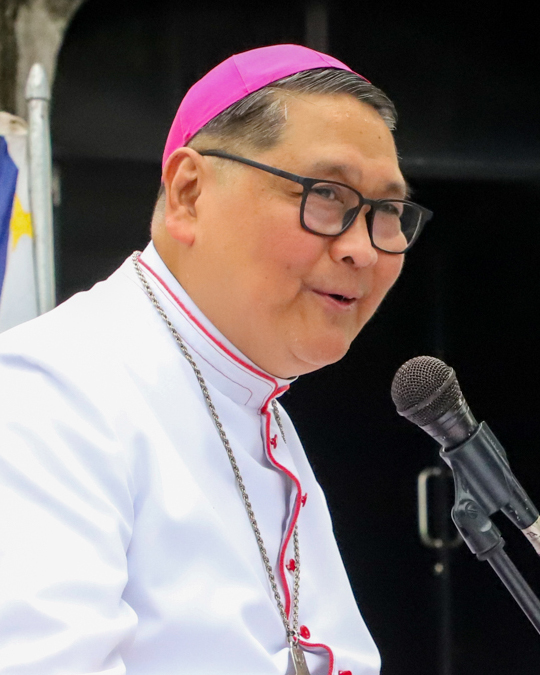
- Vergara in 2025
- Province: Manila
- See: Pasig
- Appointed: April 20, 2011
- Installed: June 23, 2011
- Predecessor: Francisco San Diego
- Successor: Incumbent
- Previous posts: Bishop of San Jose (2005–2011); Apostolic Administrator of San Pablo (2023–2024); Vice President, Catholic Bishops' Conference of the Philippines (2021–2025)

Orders
- Ordination: March 24, 1990 by Jaime Sin
- Consecration: April 30, 2005 by Gaudencio Rosales

Personal details
- Born: October 23, 1962 (age 64) Manila, Philippines
- Education: University of Santo Tomas; Loyola School of Theology; Ateneo de Manila University
- Motto: Pasce agnos meos (Feed My Lambs)
- Coat of arms: Mylo Hubert Vergara's coat of arms

Ordination history
History
Diaconal ordination
- Ordained by: Jaime Sin
Priestly ordination
- Ordained by: Jaime Sin
Episcopal consecration
- Principal consecrator: Gaudencio Rosales
- Co-consecrators: Honesto Ongtioco; Leo M. Drona

Styles of Mylo Hubert Vergara
- Reference style: The Most Reverend
- Spoken style: Your Excellency
- Religious style: Bishop

Mylo Hubert Claudio Vergara (born October 23, 1962) is a Filipino bishop of the Catholic Church. He is the second and current Bishop of Pasig since 2011, Vice President of the Catholic Bishops' Conference of the Philippines since 2021. He had previously served as the third Bishop of San Jose from 2005 to 2011 and as the Apostolic Administrator of the Diocese of San Pablo from 2023 to 2024.

== Early life and education ==
Mylo Hubert Claudio Vergara was born on October 23, 1962, at Manila, Philippines. He studied elementary at the Ateneo de Manila Grade School and high school at the Ateneo de Manila High School, with Novaliches Bishop Roberto Gaa as one of his classmates. For college, he took an undergraduate degree in B.S. Management Engineering, graduating in 1984. He then worked in New York City as a corporate executive before returning to the Philippines and pursue his priestly calling.

He was among the pioneering seminarians of the Holy Apostles Senior Seminary, a seminary of the Archdiocese of Manila that caters to late vocations. Later on, he took Masters in Philosophy at the Ateneo de Manila University, his licentiate in sacred theology at the Loyola School of Theology in the same university, and a Doctorate in Sacred Theology at the University of Santo Tomas.

== Ministry ==
=== Deacon (1989–1990) ===
On November 4, 1989, Vergara was ordained a deacon at the Archdiocese of Manila.

=== Priesthood (1990–2005) ===
On March 24, 1990, Vergara was ordained to the priesthood by Cardinal Jaime Sin, the Archbishop of Manila, at the Manila Cathedral.

After his ordination, Vergara served as the parochial vicar and acting parish priest of St. Andrew the Apostle Parish in Makati. From 1994 to 2001, he served as the rector of Holy Apostles Senior Seminary in Makati, where he also taught previously as dean of studies and Professor of Philosophy from 1990 to 1994. He also became the chaplain of the Chapel of the Eucharistic Lord at SM Megamall, Mandaluyong from 1999 to 2000 and of Santo Niño de Paz Greenbelt Chapel, Makati from 2000 to 2003. He was also the Spiritual Director of Archdiocesan Association of Saint John Mary Vianney from 2003 to 2003. Then, he also became the parish priest of Saint Rita de Cascia Parish in Philamlife Homes, Quezon City from 2001 to 2004. In 2003, he was named Chancellor of the newly established Diocese of Cubao, serving until 2004. He later served as parish priest of the Holy Sacrifice Parish at the University of the Philippines Diliman campus, Quezon City and vicar for clergy of the Diocese of Cubao in 2005.

=== Bishop (2005–present) ===
Vergara was appointed as the third Bishop of San Jose on February 12, 2005, by Pope John Paul II and was installed on May 14 of that same year. On April 20, 2011, he was appointed by Pope Benedict XVI as the second Bishop of Pasig and was installed on June 23 of that same year.

In 2021, Vergara was elected as vice-president of the Catholic Bishop's Conference of the Philippines with The Most Reverend Pablo Virgilio David as President.

On September 21, 2023, Vergara was appointed by Pope Francis as the apostolic administrator of the Diocese of San Pablo upon the resignation of its bishop Buenaventura Famadico due to the latter's "recent hospitalization because of a serious heart ailment." His role as apostolic administrator ended with the installation of Marcelino Antonio Maralit as Famadico's successor on November 21, 2024.

Catholic Church titles
Preceded by Leo Murphy Drona	Bishop of San Jose; May 14, 2005 – April 20, 2011	Succeeded by Roberto Calara Mallari
Preceded by Francisco San Diego	Bishop of Pasig; June 23, 2011 – present	Incumbent
Preceded by Pablo Virgilio David	CBCP Vice President; December 1, 2021 – November 30, 2025	Succeeded by Julius Tonel
