= Francisco San Diego =

Filipino Catholic prelate

The Most Reverend Francisco C. San Diego D.D., JCL
- Bishop Emeritus of Pasig
- Province: Manila
- See: Pasig
- Appointed: June 28, 2003
- Installed: August 21, 2003
- Retired: December 21, 2010
- Predecessor: Diocese erected
- Successor: Mylo Hubert Vergara
- Previous posts: Bishop of San Pablo (1995–2003); Apostolic Vicar of Palawan (1987–1995); Coadjutor Vicar Apostolic of Palawan (1983–1987); Titular Bishop of Zica (1983 –1995)

Orders
- Ordination: December 21, 1963 by Hernando Antiporda
- Consecration: August 10, 1983 by Bruno Torpigliani

Personal details
- Born: October 10, 1935 Obando, Bulacan, Philippines
- Died: August 26, 2015 (aged 79) San Juan, Metro Manila, Philippines
- Denomination: Roman Catholic
- Motto: Servus Dei "Servant of God"

Ordination history
History
Priestly ordination
- Ordained by: Hernando Antiporda
Episcopal consecration
- Principal consecrator: Bruno Torpigliani
- Co-consecrators: Oscar V. Cruz; Gregorio Espiga e Infante
- Styles
- Reference style: The Most Reverend
- Spoken style: Your Excellency
- Religious style: Bishop

Francisco Capiral San Diego (October 10, 1935 – August 26, 2015) was a Filipino Catholic prelate who served as Bishop of Pasig from 2003 to 2010. He previously served as Bishop of San Pablo from 1995 to 2003.

== Biography ==
Francisco Capiral San Diego was born October 10, 1935, at Lawa, Obando, Bulacan. He spent his elementary years at Obando Elementary School and was a high school salutatorian at Western Colleges in Naic, Cavite. He underwent Special Latin Course at the Our Lady of Guadalupe Minor Seminary, then proceeded to San Carlos Seminary for his philosophical and theological studies. He was ordained to the priesthood December 21, 1963, by the Auxiliary Bishop of Manila, Hernando Antiporda.

San Diego was appointed the following year as parochial vicar of the present-day National Shrine of Our Lady of Guadalupe in Guadalupe Nuevo, Makati, after which in 1971, he succeeded as parish priest. He worked for the Metropolitan Matrimonial Tribunal of Manila from 1964 to 1983. From 1977 to 1979, he was vicar forane of the Our Lady of Guadalupe Vicariate. He obtained his Licentiate in Canon Law, cum laude, in 1979 from the Royal and Pontifical University of Santo Tomas, with his thesis entitled Those Who Practice Psychosexual Anomaly Cannot Contract A Valid Marriage. He spent some years teaching at San Carlos Seminary in Makati and Our Lady of the Angels Seminary in Novaliches, Quezon City, and was appointed Episcopal Vicar of the Ecclesiastical District of Makati. San Diego was named parish priest of San Felipe Neri Parish in Mandaluyong in 1981. That same year, he was named Monsignor with the dignity of Honorary Prelate by Pope John Paul II.

The late Apostolic Nuncio to the Philippines, Archbishop Bruno Torpigliani consecrated him as bishop August 10, 1983. He served as Coadjutor Apostolic Vicar of Palawan from 1983 to 1987, and apostolic vicar from 1987 to 1995. From 1983 to 1985, he served as pastor of St. Joseph Parish in Narra, Palawan. He too served as rector of Seminario de San Jose in Puerto Princesa from 1985 to 1988.

He succeeded Pedro Bantigue of Laguna in 1995, becoming the second Bishop of San Pablo. While serving the local church of Laguna, he built a new Bishop's Residence and Chancery Office in San Pablo, Laguna. Pope John Paul II appointed San Diego as first bishop of Pasig on June 28, 2003.

On December 21, 2010, Pope Benedict XVI finally accepted San Diego's retirement as Bishop of Pasig, in compliance with Canon 401, Paragraph 1 of the 1983 Code of Canon Law requiring bishops to submit their resignation upon reaching the mandatory age of 75. Cardinal Gaudencio Rosales, concurrently Archbishop of Manila, was named Apostolic Administrator of the diocese. The Pope named Mylo Hubert Claudio Vergara, Bishop of San Jose, Nueva Ecija and a native of Pasig, as new bishop of Pasig, April 20, 2011.

He died on August 26, 2015, due to cardiac arrest, at the age of 79.

Catholic Church titles
Preceded by Joachim Mbadu Kikhela Kupika	— TITULAR — Bishop of Zica; August 10, 1983 – July 12, 1995	Succeeded by Luigi Locati
Preceded by Gregorio Espiga y Infante	Vicar Apostolic of Palawan; December 18, 1987 – July 12, 1995; Coadjutor: June 6, 1983 – December 18, 1987	Succeeded by Pedro Arigo
Preceded by Pedro Bantigue	Bishop of San Pablo; July 12, 1995 – June 28, 2003	Succeeded by Leo M. Drona
New diocese	Bishop of Pasig; August 21, 2003 – December 21, 2010	Succeeded by Mylo Hubert Vergara
