= Diocese of San Pablo =

Roman Catholic diocese in the Philippines

Diocese of San Pablo Dioecesis Sancti Pauli in Insulis Philippinis Diyosesis ng San Pablo Diócesis de San Pablo

Catholic
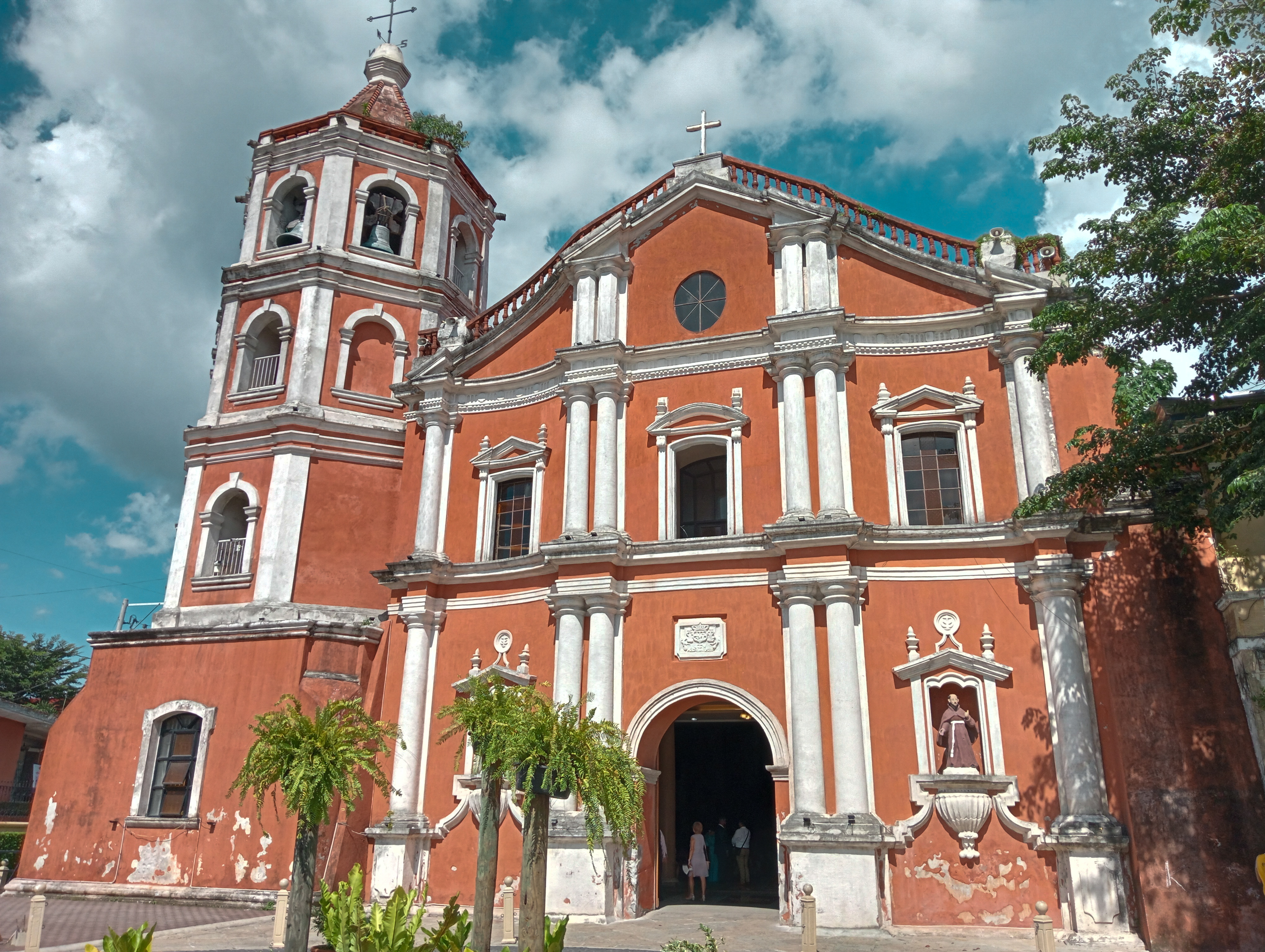
- San Pablo Cathedral

- Coat of arms

Location
- Country: Philippines
- Territory: Laguna
- Ecclesiastical province: Manila
- Metropolitan: Manila
- Coordinates: 14°04′11″N 121°19′36″E

Statistics
- Area: 1,918 km^{2} (741 sq mi)
- Population: Total; Catholics: (as of 2021); 3,748,000; 3,036,000 (81%)
- Parishes: 92
- Schools: 37

Information
- Denomination: Catholic Church
- Sui iuris church: Latin Church
- Rite: Roman Rite
- Established: November 28, 1966
- Cathedral: Cathedral-Parish of St. Paul the First Hermit
- Patron saint: Paul the First Hermit
- Secular priests: 220 (145 diocesan, 75 religious)

Current leadership
- Pope: Leo XIV
- Bishop: Marcelino Antonio Maralit, Jr.
- Metropolitan Archbishop: Jose Advincula
- Vicar General: Ricardo D. De Luna
- Episcopal Vicars: Jorge Seldon V. Coronado (District I); Francis Eugene Fadul (District II); Emil A. Urriquia (District III); Luis A. Tolentino (District IV)
- Judicial Vicar: James A. Contreras
- Bishops emeritus: Leo M. Drona; Buenaventura Famadico

Website
- Diocese of San Pablo

The Diocese of San Pablo (Latin: Dioecesis Sancti Pauli in Insulis Philippinis, Filipino: Diyosesis ng San Pablo, Spanish: Diócesis de San Pablo) is a Roman Catholic diocese which is a suffragan of the Archdiocese of Manila. Its patron saint or titular is Paul the First Hermit, the only one in the world dedicated to him.

== Location ==
The diocese covers the entire province of Laguna. It is bordered southwest by the Archdiocese of Lipa in Batangas, north by the Diocese of Antipolo in Rizal and Laguna de Bay, west by the Diocese of Imus in Cavite, east by the Prelature of Infanta and southeast by the Diocese of Lucena in Quezon, and northwest by the Diocese of Parañaque in Metro Manila.

== History ==
Christianity was introduced first in the town of Majayjay in 1571, as Augustinian missionaries were in the place and made contact with the natives. Augustinian priests in 1586 erected a parish known as the "Parish of San Pablo delos Montes". It was until 1578 when the Franciscan Apostolic Province of San Gregorio Magno was established in the Philippines and in Laguna. The two missionaries Padre Juan de Plasencia and Padre Diego de Oropesa founded on that same year formal settlements of Lumbang (Lumban) and Pila to become their primary residencia. Padre Pedro Bautista (later Saint Pedro Bautista), being the Minister Provinciale of the Franciscans in the Philippines, expanded further the establishment of parishes and pueblos, namely of Longos, Pakil, and San Antonio in 1587.

Several religious orders also took hold of parishes and lands, such as the Dominicans (in Biñan, Santa Rosa, some in San Pedro and Calamba, even in Cabuyao), the Society of Jesus (in San Pedro and Calamba) and the Augustinians (San Pablo, Bay, and Los Baños; they were later succeeded by Franciscans).

During the Philippine Revolution, churches were sacked and its properties, looted; priests were either massacred or escaped or even arrested by the Katipunan. In order to fill the curate of souls, Filipino native priests took possession of these churches.

With the advent of the Americans, there came Masonic ideals in schools and societies. The Philippine Independent Church, known popularly as Aglipayans, took hold of their presence in some towns such as Santa Cruz and Nagcarlan.

To revitalize the Christian life of the faithful in Laguna, missionary activities were made by the Redemptorists and the Jesuits. Devotions to the Most Sacred Heart of Jesus, to the Blessed Virgin of Lourdes, Therese of the Child Jesus, and Flores de Mayo were utilized and prospered in each barrio and towns. Apostolates attracted the local elites.

In 1917, a seminario menor was opened under the auspices of the priests of the Congregation of the Mission until 1941 in San Pablo.

Until 1910, Laguna was part of the ecclesiastical jurisdiction of the Archdiocese of Manila; thus, the Diocese of San Pablo was carved out from the newly constituted Diocese of Lipa. Before the diocese was carved out from Lipa, a territorial prelature existed in Laguna during World War II. Apostolic Delegate Guglielmo Piani created the Prelature Nullius of the Los Baños Internment Camp in September 1944 using the extraordinary faculties granted to him by Pope Pius XII. The prelature was tasked to oversee the welfare and spiritual needs of the 335 foreign missionaries and religious from allied countries residing in the Philippines who were incarcerated in an internment camp within the campus of University of the Philippines Los Baños. The interned Bishop of Tuguegarao Constant Jurgens was appointed prelate bishop while the interned diocesan priest Msgr. Edward Francis Casey was appointed as vicar general. Monsignor Casey was the chaplain of the Catholic College Chapel located in UPLB. A cathedral was set up in the camp called the Cathedral of Saint Joseph, which was one of the barracks in the section of the camp where the foreign religious men and women were interned.

The new diocese was erected through the Apostolic Constitution Ecclesiarum per ampla on November 28, 1966, by Pope Paul VI. Pedro Bantigue was installed as its first bishop on April 18, 1967, and became its Bishop Emeritus in 1995 until his death in 2012. He was succeeded by Francisco San Diego in 1995 who was later transferred as first Bishop of the Diocese of Pasig. Following San Diego's appointment as Bishop of Pasig, he was succeeded by Leo M. Drona, a Salesian, in 2004 until his retirement in 2013. The diocese was then led by Buenaventura M. Famadico, who was installed as fourth Bishop of San Pablo on March 2, 2013. Pope Francis accepted Famadico's resignation in September 2023. The same Pontiff, a year later, transferred Marcelino Antonio Maralit from the Diocese of Boac to the Diocese of San Pablo.

== Patron Saints ==
The titular patron of the diocese is St. Paul the First Hermit. The diocese celebrates his feast day every January 15. The anniversary of the dedication of the cathedral is a day before the feast day, every January 14. For the cathedral itself, it is ranked with solemnity (I class; Double I class with common octave in the whole diocese), but for the parishes in its jurisdiction, it is celebrated with a rank of feast. The same principle goes with the feast of the patron the next day.

On July 30, 2016, the venerated image of Nuestra Señora de los Dolores de Turumba of Pakil was declared by the diocese as the “Mother and Patroness of Laguna Lake” and the “Patroness of Laguna’s Environmental Stewardship”.

On 5 February 2022, the Diocesan Commission on Liturgical Music (DCLM) declared St. Pedro Bautista, a Spanish Franciscan missionary from Ávila, Spain and one of the 26 Christians martyred in Japan in 1597, as the patron of liturgical music in the Diocese of San Pablo. During his evangelization work in the Philippines, St. Pedro Bautista was tasked to teach music and plainchant to the natives in Santa Ana, Manila. He continued this work when he was assigned to Lumban in 1586. He is thus credited with being the first to instruct Tagalogs in Western music.

== Ordinaries ==
Bishop		Period in office	Notes	Coat of Arms
1	Pedro Natividad Bantigue	April 18, 1967 – July 12, 1995 (28 years, 116 days)	Appointed:January 26, 1967 Retired	
2	Francisco Capiral San Diego	August 22, 1995 – June 28, 2003 (7 years, 310 days)	Appointed: July 12, 1995 Appointed Bishop of Pasig	
3	Leo Murphy Drona, S.D.B.	June 18, 2004 – January 25, 2013 (8 years, 221 days)	Appointed: May 14, 2004 Resigned	
4	Buenaventura Malayo Famadico	March 2, 2013 – September 21, 2023 (10 years, 239 days)	Appointed: January 25, 2013 Resigned due to health reasons	
5	Marcelino Antonio Malabanan Maralit	November 21, 2024 – present (1 year, 236 days)	Appointed: September 21, 2024 Chairman of the CBCP – Episcopal Commission on the Youth. (since December 2025)	

=== Priests of the Diocese who became Bishops ===
- Bernardino C. Cortez (1974–2004) – appointed Auxiliary Bishop of the Archdiocese of Manila (2004–2014) and Bishop Prelate of Infanta (2015–2025)

== Seminaries ==
Because of the shortage of priests in the diocese, there have been several priests who were incardinated into the diocese. With Pedro Bantigue as the newly appointed bishop at that time, he established a seminary, following the canonical erection of the Diocese of San Pablo.

The San Pablo Minor Seminary was opened in 1968 but was eventually closed in 1981. In that same year, the major seminary of the diocese was established, namely, the Saint Peter's College Seminary, in order to stress the obedience of those under the diocese towards the See of Peter. It was inaugurated on July 6, 1981, under Elias O. Poblete. It is located in Barangay Concepcion, San Pablo and serves as the philosophy college seminary of the diocese.

The other seminary, the San Pablo Theological Formation House, is located in Tagaytay, Cavite, serves as the formation house for the theology seminarians of the diocese. It was named after Saint Paul the Apostle, as it was formerly named after the patron of the diocese, Saint Paul the First Hermit.

== See also ==
- Roman Catholic churches in Laguna
