= Diocese of Pasig =

Latin Catholic diocese in the Philippines

Diocese of Pasig Dioecesis Pasigina: Diyosesis ng Pasig; Diócesis de Pásig

Catholic
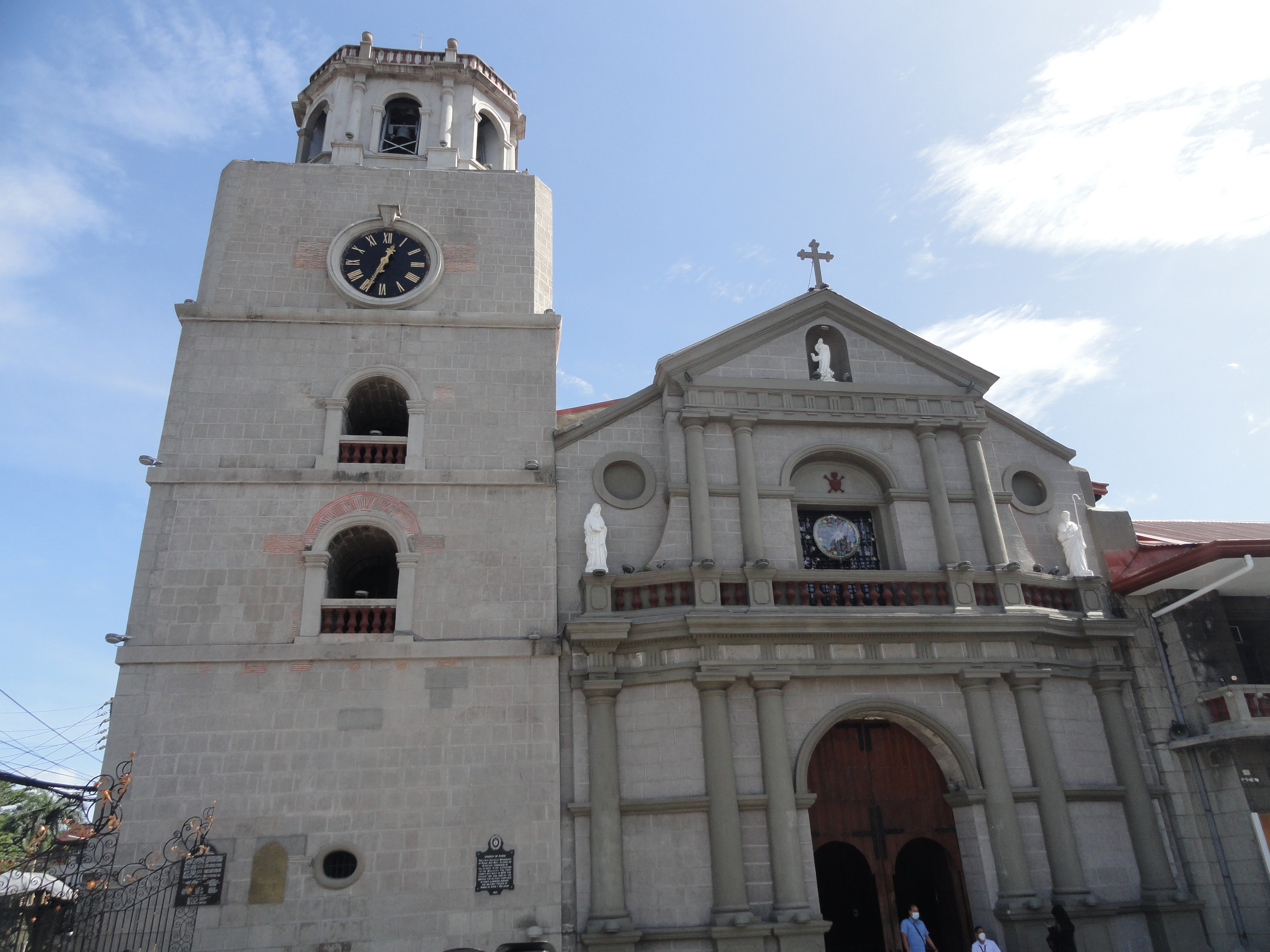
- Immaculate Conception Cathedral-Parish (Pasig Cathedral)

- Coat of arms

Location
- Country: Philippines
- Territory: Pasig; Pateros; Taguig (including Bonifacio Global City and Bonifacio Capital District but excluding Fort Bonifacio proper and the Embo barangays)
- Ecclesiastical province: Manila
- Metropolitan: Manila
- Coordinates: 14°33′37″N 121°04′37″E

Statistics
- Area: 78 km^{2} (30 sq mi)
- Population: Total; Catholics: (as of 2021); 1,884,577; 1,612,549 (85.6%)
- Parishes: 34 parishes (2 shrines, 1 minor basilica), 1 personal parish (Korean) 1 chaplaincy

Information
- Denomination: Catholic Church
- Sui iuris church: Latin Church
- Rite: Roman Rite
- Established: June 28, 2003
- Cathedral: Immaculate Conception Cathedral
- Patroness: Immaculate Conception
- Secular priests: 41

Current leadership
- Pope: Leo XIV
- Bishop: Mylo Hubert Vergara
- Metropolitan Archbishop: Jose Advincula
- Vicar General: Orlando B. Cantillon

Website
- dioceseofpasig.org

The Diocese of Pasig (Latin: Dioecesis Pasigina; Filipino: Diyosesis ng Pasig) is a Latin Catholic diocese of the Catholic Church in the Philippines that comprises the cities of Pasig and Taguig (with the exception of the Embo barangays that were previously part of Makati which are under the jurisdiction of Archdiocese of Manila and Fort Bonifacio which are under the jurisdiction of Military Ordinariate of the Philippines), and the municipality of Pateros, in Metro Manila, Philippines. It was established by Pope John Paul II on June 28, 2003, by virtue of the papal bull Dei Caritas. It was formally and canonically erected on August 21, 2003, with the installation of Francisco C. San Diego as its first bishop. The Immaculate Conception Cathedral-Parish, located in the central vicinity of Pasig, was made the cathedral or the seat of the diocese.

== Historical background ==
Prior to the establishment as a local church, the present-day Diocese of Pasig used to be a part of the Archdiocese of Manila (largely under the Ecclesiastical District of Makati). The Vicariate of Santo Tomas de Villanueva was then under the Diocese of Antipolo. The oldest parishes, built during the Spanish colonialization period, were in Pasig (Immaculate Conception), Pateros (San Roque), and Taguig (Saint Anne). In 1953, the community of Santolan, Pasig was granted a parish of their own, Santo Tomas de Villanueva Parish, which was followed by the establishment of new parishes in Rosario and Bicutan (1963), Tipas and Bagong Ilog (1969), and Barrio Capitolyo (1976). The northeastern side of Pasig, which comprises the barangays of Manggahan, Santolan, De La Paz, Santa Lucia, and Rosario, was given to the newly established Diocese of Antipolo in 1983. Between 1985 and 1995, six chapels of the Immaculate Conception Parish were elevated as independent parishes.

Parishes belonging to the Vicariate of the Immaculate Conception and to the municipalities of Taguig and Pateros were part of the Ecclesiastical District of Makati, which was then headed by Manila Auxiliary Bishop Crisostomo Yalung. In October 2001, these parishes were carved out to form the new Ecclesiastical District of Pasig, with Nestor Cariño, then Secretary-General of the Catholic Bishops' Conference of the Philippines (and later the bishop and bishop-emeritus of Legazpi), as its lone district bishop. Between the years 2000 and 2003, in preparation for the erection of the new diocese, some juridical changes to the district took place. Barangays San Antonio and Oranbo, which formerly belonged to Saint Francis of Assisi Parish in Mandaluyong, were turned over to Holy Family Parish. The military chapel of Our Lady of the Assumption in Fort Bonifacio was turned over by the Military Ordinariate to the Archdiocese of Manila in 2000 and was renamed Saint Michael Chaplaincy. Saint Joseph Chapel in Upper Bicutan, Taguig, which belonged to San Martin de Porres Parish in Parañaque City, became an independent parish under the District of Pasig in 2002.

On June 28, 2003, a few months after carving out the dioceses of Parañaque and Novaliches from the Archdiocese of Manila, Pope John Paul II decreed the erection of three more new dioceses in response to the surging pastoral needs of the faithful of the archdiocese. With the promulgation of the papal bull Dei Caritas, the Pope officially established the new Diocese of Pasig and appointed Francisco Capiral San Diego, then bishop of San Pablo, Laguna, as its first bishop. The Vicariate of Santo Tomas de Villanueva was separated from the Diocese of Antipolo to be included in the new diocese. The diocese was canonically erected on August 21, 2003, with the installation of Bishop San Diego in the presence of the Apostolic Nuncio, Archbishop Antonio Franco, Manila Archbishop Cardinal Jaime Sin, and the bishops gracing the occasion. Bishop San Diego named the district's episcopal vicar, Rodolfo Gallardo, as the first vicar general, Roy Rosales as the first chancellor, Pedro Enrique Rabonza IV as judicial vicar, Amando Litana as superintendent of Catholic schools, and Manuel Gabriel as the diocesan pastoral director.

In December 2003, Msgr. Gallardo was installed as the second rector of the Immaculate Conception Cathedral-Parish. After he retired as vicar-general and cathedral rector in February 2005, he was succeeded by Bishop San Diego as acting parish priest and rector. The bishop named Ramil Marcos, his private secretary and vice-chancellor, as the second vicar general of the diocese and Roy Rosales as the fourth rector of the cathedral. In 2006, he appointed Orlando Cantillon as the new vicar general.

During his term, Bishop San Diego worked for the improvement of the Catholic cemetery and the construction of the bishop's residence and diocesan offices within the vicinity of the cathedral. He started a retirement plan fund for the clergy and summoned a general pastoral assembly for lay leaders in the diocese. Due to the shortage of parish priests, he entrusted a number of parishes to guest priests as priests-in-charge or administrators. His term was marked by the papal canonical coronation of the image of Our Lady of the Immaculate Conception of Pasig in the cathedral on December 7, 2008, the solemn declaration of San Roque Parish in Pateros as the Diocesan Shrine of Santa Marta on February 7, 2009, and the establishment of Tanyag Chapel, which belonged to Sagrada Familia Parish, as a quasi-parish (Our Mother of Perpetual Help Quasi-Parish) on September 8, 2010.

On December 21, 2010, Pope Benedict XVI accepted San Diego's retirement as bishop and named Manila Archbishop Cardinal Gaudencio Rosales as concurrent apostolic administrator of the diocese. On April 20, 2011, the Pope appointed Mylo Hubert Claudio Vergara, bishop of San Jose, Nueva Ecija, as the second bishop of Pasig. During his term, Bishop Vergara strengthened the lay evangelization programs in the diocese, invited some religious orders to administer a number of parishes in the diocese, and oversaw the inauguration of the Tahanan ng Mabuting Pastol (House of Good Shepherd) Building within the vicinity of Santa Clara de Montefalco Parish to house the new bishop's residence and diocesan offices on April 24, 2017. On September 15, 2012, he established San Vicente Ferrer Quasi-Parish in Palar Village, Barangay Pinagsama, Taguig and later elevated Our Mother of Perpetual Help Quasi-Parish in Bagong Tanyag (2015), St. Michael the Archangel Chaplaincy in Fort Bonifacio (2017), and St. Vincent Ferrer Quasi-Parish in Palar (2018) to full-fledged parochial status.

== Clergy ==
=== Ordinaries ===
| Bishop | | Period in office | Notes | Coat of arms |
|---|---|---|---|---|
| 1 | Francisco Capiral San Diego | August 21, 2003 – December 21, 2010 (7 years, 122 days) | Retired from office | |
| 2 | Mylo Hubert Claudio Vergara | June 23, 2011 – present (14 years, 354 days) | Vice President of the Catholic Bishops' Conference of the Philippines (2021-2025) | |

=== Vicar-General ===
The vicar-general assists the bishop in the administrative duties over the diocese. Since the time of Ramil Marcos, the vicar-general serves also as adviser for the diocesan seminarians.

- (Lt. Col.) Rodolfo A. Gallardo (2003 to 2005)
- Ramil R. Marcos (2005 to 2006)
- Orlando B. Cantillon (2006–present)

=== Board of Consultors ===
Priests with key positions to the diocese, as of June 1, 2023, are as follows:

- Bishop – Most. Rev. Mylo Hubert C. Vergara
- Vicar General – Rev. Fr. Orlando B. Cantillon (preceded by Ramil R. Marcos)
- Moderator Curiae - Rev. Fr. Mariano L. Baranda
- Episcopal Vicar for the Clergy – Rev. Fr. Amando N. Litana
- Episcopal Vicar for Guest Priests – Rev. Fr. Renier N. Llorca (preceded by Paulino G. Balagtas)
- Judicial Vicar – Rev. Fr. Elpidio Geneta, JCD
- Chancellor – Rev. Fr. Joeffrey Brian V. Catuiran, JCL | Rev. Fr. Rodifel De Leon (Vice)
- Oeconomus (Treasurer) – Rev. Fr. Orlindo F. Ordoña
- Superintendent of Catholic Schools – Rev. Fr. Daniel L. Estacio

=== Presbyteral Council ===
- Ex Officio Members – all the members of the Board of Consultors
- Permanent Members (Vicars Forane)

Vicariate of the Immaculate Conception – Mariano Baranda
Vicariate of Santo Tomas de Villanueva – Reynaldo Reyes
Vicariate of Saint Anne – Loreto Sanchez Jr.
Vicariate of Santo Niño – Orlindo Ordoña

- Other Members:

Glenn Gaabucayan
Reynaldo Reyes
Joselito Jopson
Hernandez Mendoza
Adriano Amores, Jr.
Edmond Reynaldo
Arnold Eramiz
Jorge Jesus Bellosillo
Emmanuel Hipolito
Rodolfo Paragas

=== Diocesan commissions and ministries ===
Below is the list of priests who chair the respective diocesan ministries or commissions.

- Basic Ecclesial Communities - Rev. Fr. Joselito Jopson | Rev. Fr. Julius V. De Gracia (Asst.)
- BIblical Apostolate - Rev. Fr. Reynaldo Reyes
- Caritas Pasig, Inc. - Rev. Fr. Edmond Reynaldo
- Cultural Heritage of the Church - Rev. Fr. Roy Rosales
- Diocesan Council for the Laity - Rev. Fr. Orlando Cantillon
- Exorcism -Rev. Fr. Daniel Estacio
- Ecology - Rev. Fr. Edmond Reynaldo
- Ecumenism and Inter-Faith Dialogue - Rev. Fr. Reynaldo Reyes
- Catechetics - Rev. Fr. Bernardo Carpio | Rev. Fr. John Michael Mallanao (Asst)
- Family and Life - Rev. Fr. Darwin Calderon
- Healthcare - Rev. Fr. Glenn Gaabucayan
- Liturgical Affairs - Rev. Fr. Roberto Carlo Okol
- Diocesan Marian Council - Rev. Fr. Renier Llorca
- Religious Congregations and Institutes - Rev. Fr. Adriano Amores
- Migrants and Itinerant People - Rev. Fr. Jorge Jesus Bellosillo
- Mission Apostolate - Rev. Fr. Rodolfo Paragas Jr.
- Parish Pastoral Council for Responsible Voting - Rev. Fr. Loreto Sanchez Jr.
- Pastoral Formation - Rev. Fr. Edgardo Barrameda
- Pondo ng Pinoy (Pasig) - Rev. Fr. Edmond Reynaldo
- Prison - Rev. Fr. John Albert V. Absalon
- Renewal/Charismatic Movements - Rev. Fr. Emmanuel Hipolito
- Social Communications - Rev. Fr. Joselito I. Jopson | Rev. Fr. Flordelito Dador Jr. (Asst.)
- Social Services Development Ministry - Edmond Reynaldo
- Ugnayan ng Barangay at Simbahan - Rev. Fr. Loreto Sanchez Jr.
- Vocation - Rev. Fr. Joseph Santos
- Youth Affairs - Rev. Fr. Joeffrey Brian Catuiran | Rev. Fr. Cedric Mallares (Asst.)

PARISHES Vicariate of Immaculate Conception IMMACULATE CONCEPTION CATHEDRAL- Rev. Fr. Mariano L. Baranda (Rector/ Parish Priest) | Rev. Fr. Rizalino C. Jose, Rev. Fr. John Glenn Avilla (Parochial Vicar) | Rev. Daniel L. Estacio (Resident Priest)

== Statistics ==
The Diocese of Pasig had 1,306,505 baptized Catholics, representing 82.7 percent of all 1,580,225 people in the territory (as of March 2008). In 2006, the diocese recorded 36,475 baptisms and had 725 catechumens.
