= Pedro Bantigue =

Filipino prelate

- Bishop of San Pablo
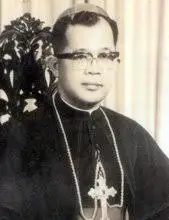
- Portrait of Bishop Pedro Bantigue
- See: San Pablo
- Appointed: January 26, 1967
- Installed: April 18, 1967
- Term ended: July 12, 1995
- Predecessor: Position created
- Successor: Francisco San Diego
- Previous posts: Auxiliary bishop of Manila (1961–1967); Titular bishop of Catula (1961–1967); Parish priest, Quiapo Church (1961–1967)

Orders
- Ordination: May 31, 1945
- Consecration: July 25, 1961 by Rufino Santos

Personal details
- Born: January 31, 1920 Hagonoy, Bulacan, Philippine Islands
- Died: November 20, 2012 (aged 92) San Pablo, Laguna, Philippines
- Motto: Dei Sumus Adjutores (Latin for 'We are God’s co-workers' – 1 Corinthians 3:9)
- Coat of arms: Pedro Bantigue's coat of arms

Pedro Natividad Bantigue (January 31, 1920 – November 20, 2012) was a Filipino prelate of the Catholic Church. He is notably the first bishop in the Philippines to come from Hagonoy, as well as the Province of Bulacan.

== Early life and education ==
Bantigue was born in Barrio Santa Monica, Hagonoy, Bulacan on January 31, 1920. As a young child, he was already serving their local parish, prompting him eventually to pursue priesthood. He entered the San Carlos Seminary of the Archdiocese of Manila, where he studied philosophy and theology under the Vincentians. He later studied education at the University of Santo Tomas and received his Bachelor of Science in Education in 1948.

In 1957, he received his Doctor of Canon Law from the Catholic University of America. His doctoral thesis was about the Provincial Council of Manila of 1771, of which he made annotations to the documentary sources.

== Presbyteral ministry ==
Bantigue was ordained priest for the Archdiocese of Manila by Archbishop Michael O'Doherty on May 31, 1945. He was appointed as parish priest of San Jose de Trozo Parish in Santa Cruz, Manila, serving from 1945 to 1947. In 1947, he was appointed vicar econome of the San Miguel Pro-Cathedral and concurrent prefect of discipline of the Manila Cathedral School. In 1949, he became the private secretary to the Archbishop of Manila, serving under Archbishops O'Doherty, Gabriel M. Reyes and Rufino Cardinal Santos until 1954.

The following year, Bantigue served as secretary to Msgr. Giacomo Morelli, who was the Apostolic Visitator to the Seminaries in the Philippines. In 1958, he became the first parish priest of the Sta. Rita de Cascia Parish in Quezon City, and concurrently served as Vicar Forane of the Vicariate of Sta. Rita de Cascia until his elevation to the episcopate. Two years later, he was elevated by Pope John XXIII to the rank of domestic prelate.

== Episcopal ministry ==
On May 29, 1961, Pope John XXIII appointed Bantigue as auxiliary bishop of Manila and titular bishop of Catula. He was consecrated bishop on July 25, 1961 by Rufino Cardinal Santos, with Xiamen Bishop Juan Bautista Velasco Diaz, OP and Calapan Apostolic Vicar Wilhelm Josef Duschak, SVD as co-consecrators. As auxiliary bishop, he assisted in the governance of the Archdiocese of Manila through his appointment as its vicar general. He also served as parish priest of Quiapo Church from 1961 to 1967. He was also one of the council fathers for Session Three of the Second Vatican Council from September to November 1964.

Following the establishment of the Diocese of San Pablo, in 1967, Bantigue was appointed by Pope Paul VI as its first bishop. He quickly initiated efforts to propagate vocations in the new diocese by establishing the San Pablo Minor Seminary in 1967; when it was closed in 1981, he replaced it with the St. Peter's College Seminary in San Pablo, Laguna. In 1988, he also organized the San Pablo Theological Formation House in Tagaytay.

Bantigue formed several new parishes in response to the increasing population of Catholics in Laguna. He invited numerous religious congregations to help in taking care the pastoral needs of the faithful of the new diocese. He established parochial schools across the diocese, and in response to the decision of the Supreme Ecclesiastical Tribunal in Rome, they took over the Ateneo de San Pablo and transformed it as the present-day Liceo de San Pablo.

Beyond his diocese, he served in various capacities at the Catholic Bishops Conference of the Philippines, such as CBCP treasurer, chairman of the CBCP Episcopal Commissions on the Clergy and on Prisoners' Welfare, and member of the CBCP Matrimonial Tribunal, Episcopal Commissions on Family and Life, Clergy, and Pontifico Collegio Filippino. He was also the chairman of the Finance Committee for the 1981 papal visit and the National Catholic Committee on Scouting. He also became president of the Kapisanan ng Kapariang Taga-Hagonoy (KAKATHA), an association of Roman Catholic priests who came from Hagonoy, Bulacan.

== Retirement and death ==
Bantigue remained in office until his retirement on July 12, 1995. He was succeeded in office by Palawan Apostolic Vicar Francisco San Diego. He died on November 20, 2012, at the age of 92.

Catholic Church titles
New title	Bishop of San Pablo; 1967–1995	Succeeded by Francisco San Diego
Preceded by Paul Seitz	Titular bishop of Catula (1961–1967)	Succeeded by Renato Luisi
Preceded by Vicente Posada Reyes	Parish priest of Quiapo Church (1961–1967)	Succeeded by Bienvenido Lopez
