= Antonio Tobias =

Filipino Catholic bishop (born 1941)

His Excellency, The Most Reverend Antonio Tobias D.D., JCL
- Bishop Emeritus of Novaliches
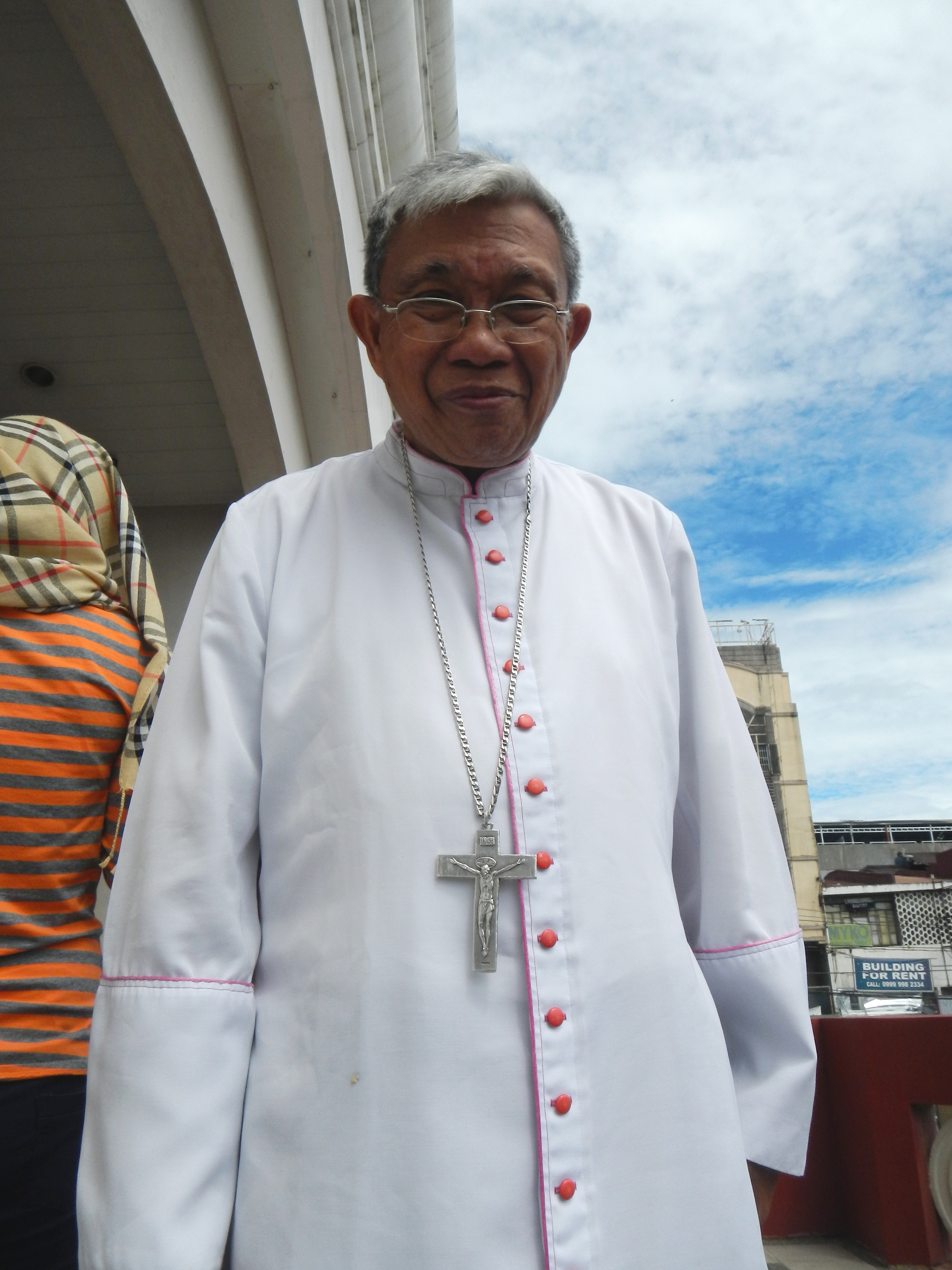
- Tobias in 2014
- Church: Roman Catholic Church
- Province: Manila
- See: Novaliches
- Appointed: November 25, 2003
- Installed: January 26, 2004
- Retired: June 6, 2019
- Predecessor: Teodoro Bacani Jr.
- Successor: Roberto Gaa
- Previous posts: Priest, Archdiocese of Manila (1965–1982); Auxiliary Bishop of Zamboanga (1983–1984); Bishop of Pagadian (1984–1993); Bishop of San Fernando de La Union (1993–2003)

Orders
- Ordination: December 21, 1965 by Rufino Santos
- Consecration: January 25, 1983 by Bruno Torpigliani

Personal details
- Born: Antonio Realubin Tobias; June 13, 1941 (age 85) Laoag, Ilocos Norte, Commonwealth of the Philippines
- Education: San Carlos Seminary; University of Santo Tomas
- Motto: Adveniat regnum Tuum ('May Your kingdom come', Matthew 6:10)
- Coat of arms

Ordination history
History
Priestly ordination
- Ordained by: Rufino Santos
- Date: December 21, 1965
- Place: Manila Cathedral
Episcopal consecration
- Principal consecrator: Bruno Torpigliani
- Co-consecrators: Francisco Raval Cruces; Oscar V. Cruz
- Date: January 25, 1983
- Place: Manila Cathedral
- Styles
- Reference style: His Excellency; The Most Reverend
- Spoken style: Your Excellency
- Religious style: Bishop

Antonio Realubin Tobias (born June 13, 1941) is a Filipino Catholic prelate who served as the second Bishop of Novaliches from 2004 to 2019.

== Early life and education ==
Antonio Realubin Tobias was born on June 13, 1941, in Laoag, Ilocos Norte in the then-Commonwealth of the Philippines, to Norberto F. Tobias and Trinidad L. Realubin. After completing his high school years at the Our Lady of Guadalupe Minor Seminary, he studied at San Carlos Seminary, where he earned a bachelor's degree in philosophy. He also studied theology at the same seminary. In 1968, he earned a licentiate in canon law, magna cum laude, at the University of Santo Tomas.

== Ministry ==
=== Priesthood ===
Tobias was ordained to the priesthood by Cardinal Rufino Santos on December 21, 1965, at the Manila Cathedral. From 1966, he served as assistant priest of San Juan Nepomuceno Parish in Pasay until 1970. He was also part of the Metropolitan Matrimonial Tribunal of San Carlos Seminary until 1983. From 1970 until 1982, he was a seminary formator at Our Lady of Guadalupe Minor Seminary in Makati.

=== Episcopate ===
Pope John Paul II appointed him Auxiliary Bishop of Zamboanga on November 3, 1982, and was ordained to the episcopate on January 25, 1983, at the Manila Cathedral. On September 14, 1984, he was named Bishop of Pagadian, and on May 28, 1993, Bishop of San Fernando de La Union.

Following a scandal involving the first bishop of the newly erected Diocese of Novaliches, Teodoro Bacani Jr., Pope John Paul II appointed Tobias as its apostolic administrator sede plena on June 21, 2003. Subsequently, John Paul II appointed Tobias on November 25 to succeed Bacani. He was canonically installed at the Cathedral of the Good Shepherd by the Archbishop of Manila, Cardinal Gaudencio Rosales, on January 26, 2004.

In response to the drug war of President Rodrigo Duterte, Tobias and his diocese opened a drug rehabilitation center in September 2016. The move aimed at lessening the number of casualties caused by the drug war.

Pope Francis accepted his retirement on June 6, 2019, and appointed Roberto Gaa as his successor. Tobias served as apostolic administrator until Gaa's installation on August 24, 2019.

== Political involvement ==
In 2005, Tobias apologized to former President Joseph Estrada for the Catholic Church's role in the Second EDSA Revolution which led to his ouster. The Catholic Bishops' Conference of the Philippines (CBCP), through its president Angel Lagdameo, clarified that Tobias's apology reflects his personal opinion, and not the Church's official stance. The Bishop of Kalookan, Deogracias Iñiguez, echoed Lagdameo's sentiments, but said that Tobias's apology was "unnecessary".

In November 2007, Tobias, together with bishops Iniguez and Julio Xavier Labayen, led a prayer rally at Plaza Miranda to call for the resignation of then-President Gloria Macapagal Arroyo.

Catholic Church titles
| Preceded by Victor João Herman José Tielbeek | — TITULAR — Bishop of Tipasa in Numidia; January 25, 1983 – September 14, 1984 | Succeeded by Sérgio Arthur Braschi |
| Preceded by Jesus Tuquib | Bishop of Pagadian; September 14, 1984 – May 28, 1993 | Succeeded by Zacharias Jimenez |
| Preceded by Salvador Lazo Lazo | Bishop of San Fernando de La Union; May 28, 1993 – November 25, 2003 | Succeeded by Artemio Lomboy Rillera SVD |
| Preceded by Teodoro Bacani Jr. | Bishop of Novaliches; January 26, 2004 – June 6, 2019 | Succeeded by Roberto Gaa |
