= Roberto Gaa =

Filipino Catholic bishop (born 1962)

His Excellency, The Most Reverend Roberto Orendain Gaa D.D.
- Bishop of Novaliches
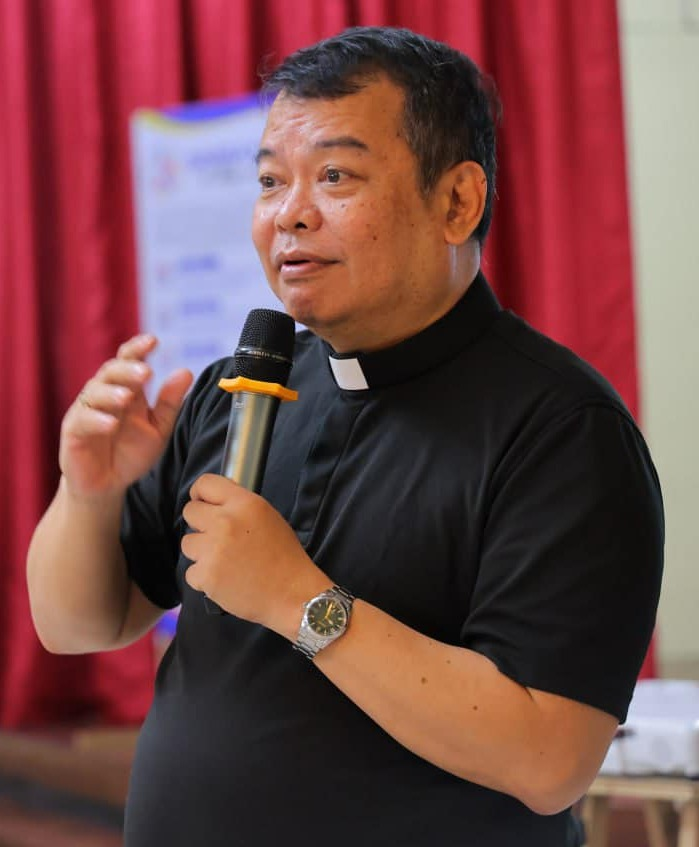
- Gaa in 2023
- Province: Manila
- See: Novaliches
- Appointed: June 6, 2019
- Installed: August 24, 2019
- Predecessor: Antonio Tobias

Orders
- Ordination: September 23, 2000 by Jaime Cardinal Sin
- Consecration: August 22, 2019 by Luis Antonio Tagle

Personal details
- Born: October 4, 1962 (age 64) Manila, Philippines
- Denomination: Roman Catholic
- Motto: Finem Fidei Salutem Animarum "The result of faith, the salvation of souls" (1 Peter 1:9)

Ordination history
History
Episcopal consecration
- Principal consecrator: Luis Antonio Tagle
- Co-consecrators: Socrates Villegas; Mylo Hubert Vergara
- Styles
- Reference style: His Excellency; The Most Reverend
- Spoken style: Your Excellency
- Religious style: Bishop

Roberto "Robbie" Orendain Gaa (born October 4, 1962) is a Filipino Catholic prelate currently serving as the bishop of the Diocese of Novaliches. He was appointed by Pope Francis on June 6, 2019, and was consecrated as bishop on August 22, 2019.

== Early life and education ==
Gaa was born on October 4, 1962, in Manila, Philippines. After completing high school, he earned a bachelor's degree in mechanical engineering from the University of the Philippines Diliman in Quezon City. He then entered the San Carlos Seminary Graduate School of Theology in Makati, where he studied philosophy and theology.

From 2003 to 2005, he pursued further studies at the Pontifical Gregorian University in Rome, obtaining a Licentiate in Spirituality.

== Priesthood ==
Gaa was ordained a priest for the Archdiocese of Manila on September 23, 2000. His first assignments were as Parochial Vicar at Saint John the Baptist Parish, Immaculate Conception Parish, Presentation of the Child Jesus Parish, and Saint Anthony of Padua Parish. Between 2002 and 2003, he served as Parish Priest of Holy Spirit Parish in Caloocan City.

After returning from his studies in Rome, he became spiritual director and dean of studies at Holy Apostles Senior Seminary in Makati City in 2003. He was later appointed rector of the seminary in 2008 and became a member of the Presbyteral Council of the Archdiocese of Manila.

== Episcopal ministry ==
On June 6, 2019, Pope Francis appointed Gaa as the bishop of Novaliches, following the retirement of Bishop Antonio Tobias.

His episcopal consecration took place on August 22, 2019, at the Manila Cathedral presided by Luis Antonio Cardinal Tagle, the then Archbishop of Manila. Two days later, on August 24, 2019, he was canonically installed at the Cathedral of the Good Shepherd in Novaliches.

Within the Catholic Bishops' Conference of the Philippines (CBCP), he has served as vice-chairman of the Commission Seminaries from 2019 to 2021 and chairman of the Commission on Vocations since 2021.

Catholic Church titles
Preceded by Antonio Tobias	Bishop of Novaliches; August 24, 2019 – present	Incumbent
