= Archdiocese of Manila =

Archdiocese in the Philippines

Archdiocese of Manila Archidioecesis Manilensis Arkidiyosesis ng Maynila Arquidiócesis de Manila

Catholic
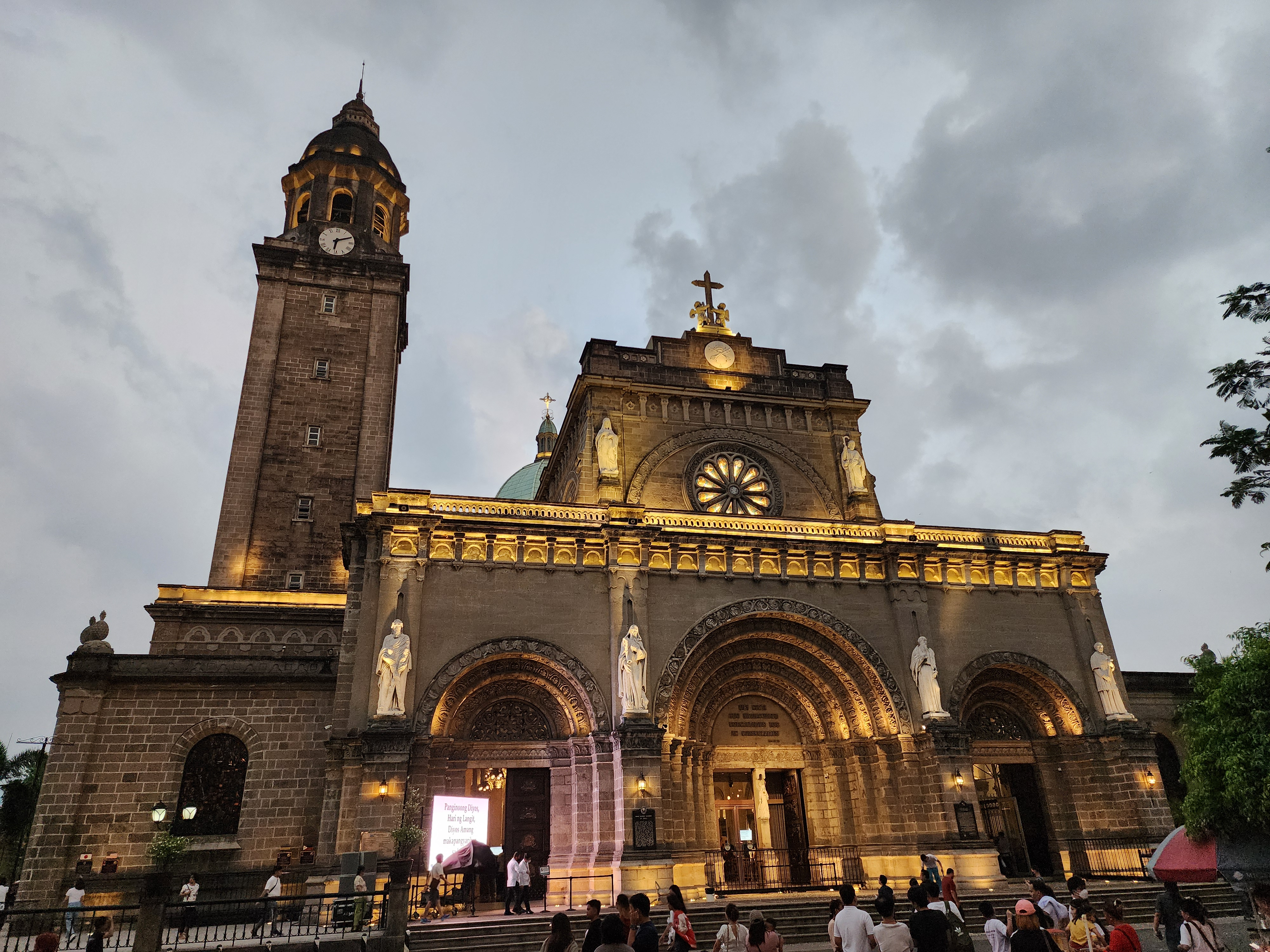
- Manila Cathedral

Location
- Country: Philippines
- Territory: City of Manila; Taguig (Embo barangays); Makati; Mandaluyong; Pasay (except Newport City and Villamor Air Base); City of San Juan; Quezon City (EDSA Shrine)
- Ecclesiastical province: Manila
- Deaneries: 13 (list): Espiritu Santo; Holy Family; José de Trozo; Our Lady of Loreto; San Felipe Neri; Santo Niño; Nuestra Señora de Guia; San Fernando de Dilao; Santa Clara de Montefalco; Saint Joseph the Worker; Saints Peter and Paul; Nuestra Señora de Gracia; Saint John the Baptist
- Headquarters: Arzobispado de Manila; Intramuros, Manila 1002
- Coordinates: 14.5904202°N 120.9708023°E

Statistics
- Area: 549 km^{2} (212 sq mi)
- Population: Total; Catholics: (as of 2021); 3,287,728; 2,663,060 (81%)
- Parishes: Around 100 full-fledged parishes, quasi parish, 1 personal parish, chaplaincies, mission stations (mall and condo chapels)

Information
- Denomination: Catholic Church
- Sui iuris church: Latin Church
- Rite: Roman Rite
- Established: February 6, 1579; 447 years ago (Diocese); August 14, 1595; 431 years ago (Archdiocese)
- Cathedral: Minor Basilica and Metropolitan Cathedral of the Immaculate Conception
- Patroness: Immaculate Conception
- Secular priests: 256
- Language: English and Filipino

Current leadership
- Pope: Leo XIV
- Metropolitan Archbishop: Cardinal Jose Advincula, O.P.
- Suffragans: Sede Vacante (Parañaque); Elias Ayuban, C.M.F. (Cubao); Marcelino Antonio Maralit (San Pablo); Reynaldo G. Evangelista, O.F.S. (Imus); Mylo Hubert Vergara (Pasig); Cardinal Pablo Virgilio David (Kalookan); Ruperto Santos (Antipolo); Dennis Villarojo (Malolos); Roberto Gaa (Novaliches)
- Vicar General: Msgr. Reginald R. Malicdem
- Episcopal Vicars: Msgr. Esteban Lo (Manila); Fr. Joselito Martin (Makati with Embo barangays); Fr. Cesar Buhat (Mandaluyong); Fr. Edgardo Coroza (Pasay); Fr. Michael Kalaw (San Juan)
- Judicial Vicar: Msgr. Geronimo Reyes
- Bishops emeritus: Cardinal Gaudencio Rosales

Map
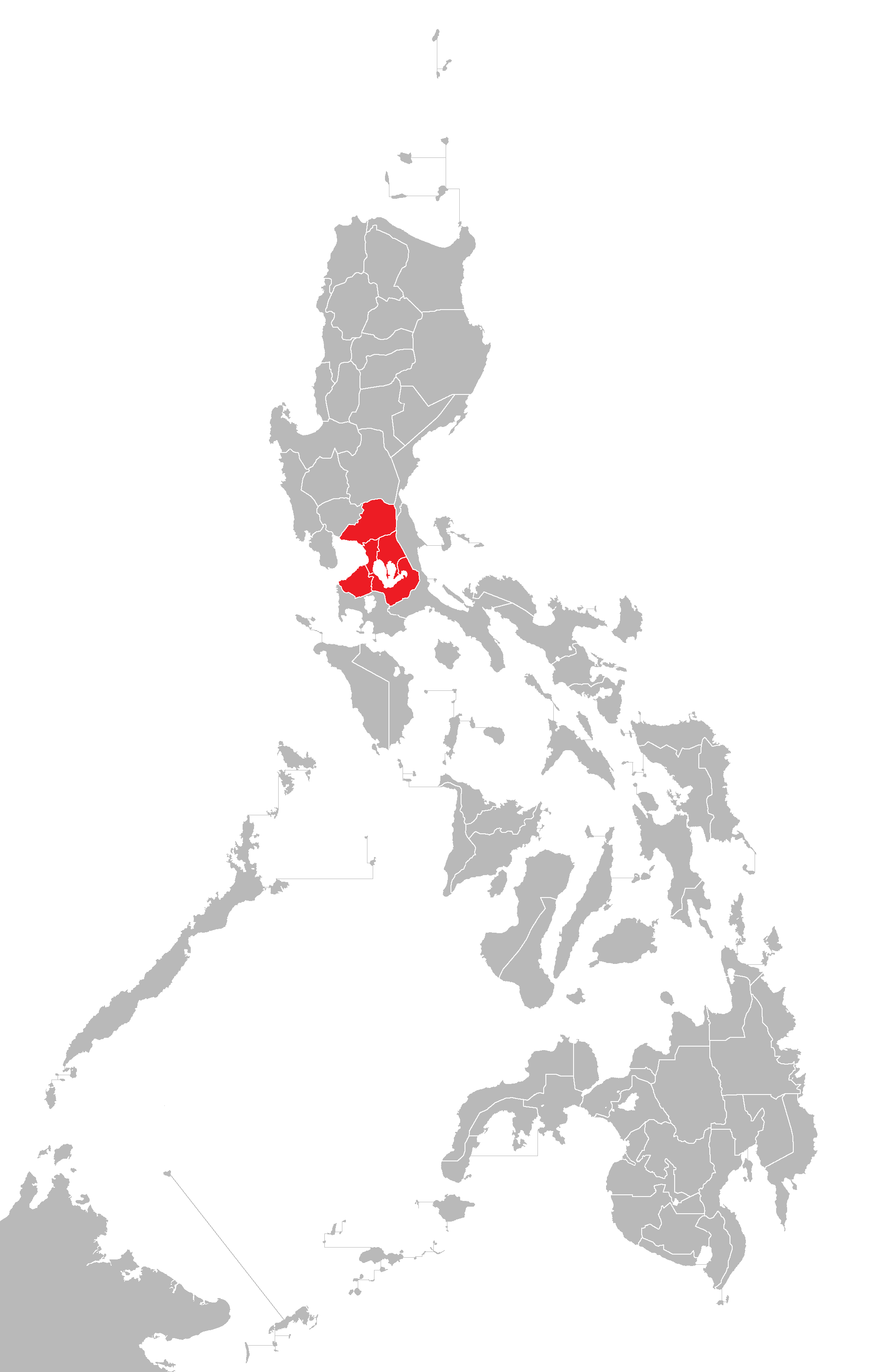
- Jurisdiction of the metropolitan see within the Philippines

Website
- Archdiocese of Manila

The Archdiocese of Manila (Latin: Archidioecesis Manilensis; Filipino: Arkidiyosesis ng Maynilà; Spanish: Arquidiócesis de Manila) is a Latin Church archdiocese of the Catholic Church in Metro Manila, Philippines. Its territory covers the cities of Manila, Makati, Mandaluyong, Pasay, and San Juan; the Embo barangays of Taguig that were formerly part of Makati; and the EDSA Shrine in Quezon City. Its episcopal see is the Minor Basilica and Metropolitan Cathedral of the Immaculate Conception, also known as the Manila Cathedral, located in Intramuros, the old colonial city of Manila. The Blessed Virgin Mary, under the title of the Immaculate Conception, is principal patroness of the archdiocese as well as the country.

The Archdiocese of Manila is the oldest in the Philippines, created in 1579 as a diocese and elevated to the rank of metropolitan archdiocese in 1595. Since its last territorial changes in 2003, the Archdiocese of Manila is the metropolitan see of the ecclesiastical province of the same name, which includes seven dioceses in other parts of the National Capital Region such as Antipolo (Marikina), Cubao, Kalookan, Novaliches, Parañaque, Malolos (Valenzuela), and Pasig, as well as four dioceses in the surrounding provinces of Cavite (Diocese of Imus), Rizal (Diocese of Antipolo), Bulacan (Diocese of Malolos), and Laguna (Diocese of San Pablo).

The archdiocese is also de facto overseer of the Military Ordinariate of the Philippines, as well as the apostolic vicariates of Puerto Princesa and Taytay in Palawan, alongside all exempt dioceses of the Holy See (with the vicariates under the jurisdiction of the Dicastery for Evangelization).

The archdiocese also owns, operates, and manages various extraterritorial assets and temporalities, such as the radio station DZRV Radio Veritas 846 kHz along with Our Lady of Veritas Chapel (both in Quezon City) and its transmitter (Longos, Meycauayan); the Mount Peace and Saint Michael retreat houses (Baguio City and Antipolo City); and Redemptoris Mater Archdiocesan Seminary of the Neocatechumenal Way (Parañaque City) located at the dioceses of Cubao, Malolos, Baguio, Antipolo, and Parañaque, respectively. Additionally, the archdiocese is among the top 100 shareholders of the Bank of the Philippine Islands.

Since June 24, 2021, Cardinal Jose Advincula has been the 33rd archbishop of Manila.

== History ==
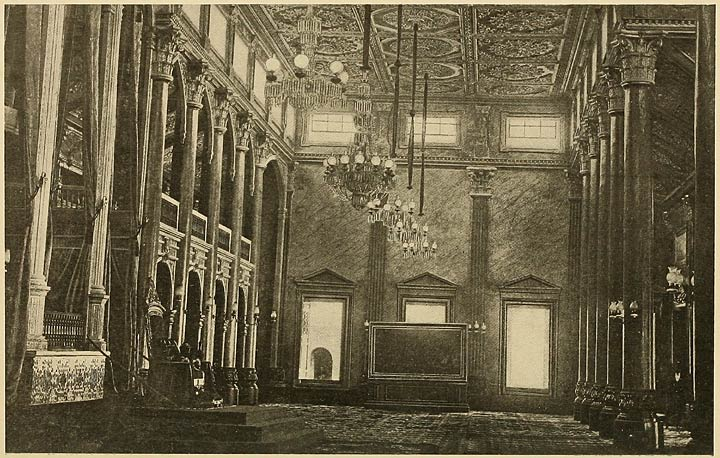
Interior of the Throne Room of the Archbishop's Palace during the Spanish colonial period.

Per the efforts of conquistador Martín de Goiti – who founded the City of Manila by uniting the dominions of Sulayman III of Namayan, Sabag, Rajah Ache Matanda of Maynila who was a vassal to the Sultan of Brunei, and Lakan Dula of Tondo who was a tributary to Ming dynasty China – the Diocese of Manila was established on February 6, 1579, through the papal bull Illius Fulti Præsidio by Pope Gregory XIII, encompassing all Spanish colonies in Asia as a suffragan of the Archdiocese of Mexico. Fray Domingo de Salazar, a Dominican from the Convent of San Sebastian in Salamanca, Spain, was selected by King Philip II of Spain to be bishop of the new diocese and was presented to the pope.

Over the course of history and growth of Catholicism in the Philippines, the diocese was elevated in rank and new dioceses had been carved from its territory. On August 14, 1595, Pope Clement VIII raised the diocese to the status of an archdiocese with Bishop Ignacio Santibáñez its first archbishop. Three new dioceses were created as suffragans to Manila: Nueva Cáceres, Nueva Segovia, and Cebu. With the creation of these new dioceses, the territory of the archdiocese was reduced to the city of Manila and the adjoining civil provinces in proximity including Mindoro Island. It was bounded to the north by the Diocese of Nueva Segovia, to the south by the Diocese of Cebu, and to the southeast by the Diocese of Nueva Cáceres.

During the Spanish period, the archdiocese was ruled by a succession of Spanish and Latino archbishops. In the 1600s, Fr. Joaquín Martínez de Zúñiga conducted a census of the Archdiocese of Manila, which encompassed most of Luzon, and he reported 90,243 native Filipino tributes; 10,512 Chinese (Sangley) and mixed Chinese Filipino mestizo tributes; and 10,517 mixed Spanish Filipino mestizo tributes. Pure Spaniards were excluded as they were exempt from tribute, with each tribute representing an average family of 6. Out of these, Martínez extrapolated a total population count exceeding half a million souls.

The 1762 British occupation of Manila during the Seven Years' War saw the temporary conversion of Sultan Azim ud-Din I of Sulu to Catholicism, the massive looting and destruction of ecclesiastical treasures, as well as the burning of churches by British soldiers, Sepoy mercenaries, and rebellious Chinese residents in Binondo. This episode was particularly damaging to Philippine scholarship as the monasteries holding archives and artefacts on the pre-colonial Philippine Rajahnates, Kedatuans, Sultanates, Lakanates, and Wangdoms and their conversion to Catholicism were either burnt, lost, or looted. An example would be the Boxer Codex, whose earliest owner Lord Giles of Ilchester had inherited it from an ancestor who stole it during the British Occupation.

Nevertheless, peace was subsequently restored after, Catholic religious orders became the powerful driving force in the Archdiocese of Manila (with the exception of the Jesuits who were temporarily suppressed in Spanish lands due to their role in anti-imperialist movements in Latin America like the Paraguayan Reductions). Local Filipino secular clergy resented the foreign religious orders due to their near-monopoly of ecclesiastical positions, which violated the declarations of the Council of Trent, stating that once an place is no longer a missionary area but a regular diocese, friars are to surrender parishes to secular priests. However, upon the suppression of the Jesuits, the Recollect Order took over the former’s parishes and surrendered their parishes to local secular clergy, temporarily assuaging Filipino yearnings. However upon the restoration of the Jesuits, the Recollects were forced to retake their parishes from the secular priests. The opposition of the religious orders against an autonomous diocesan clergy independent of them lead to the martyrdom of Filipino diocesan priests Mariano Gómez, José Burgos, Jacinto Zamora – collectively known as Gomburza –who were wrongly implicated in the Cavite Mutiny. This stemmed from fears that, because the priest Miguel Hidalgo lead the Mexican war of independence against Spain, the same could happen in the Philippines. Furthermore, Governor-General Rafael Izquierdo y Gutiérrez, who was a Freemason, upheld the vow to protect his Masonic brothers upon discovering the Mutiny was led by some of them (Máximo Innocencio, Crisanto de los Reyes, and Enrique Paraíso), and so shifted the blame to the Gomburza since they had inspired ethnic pride among Filipinos with their clerical campaign. Izquierdo asked the Catholic hierarchy in the person of Archbishop of Manila Gregorio Melitón Martínez to have them declared heretics and defrocked, but the latter he refused as he believed in the trio’s innocence. As the colonial government executed the Gomburza, church bells across the colony were rung in mourning. This inspired the Jesuit-educated nationalist José Rizal to form La Liga Filipina, to seek reforms from Spain and recognition of local clergy.

Rizal himself was executed in 1896 and La Liga Filipina dissolved. As cries for reform were ignored, formerly loyal Filipinos were radicalized and the 1896 Philippine revolution was triggered when the Spanish discovered the anti-colonial secret organisation Katipunan (formed with Masonic rites in mind despite Catholic opposition to Freemasonry, yet were dedicated to the martyred Catholic priests as "Gomburza" was a password in the Katipunan). The United States took the Philippines from Spain following the 1898 Spanish–American War; this turned the fighting into the 1899–1902 Philippine–American War, with many Katipuneros devastated their fellow American Masons killed the Katipunan, as American lodges dismissed the Revolutionary Masonic lodges as "irregular" and illegitimate, and Philippine Freemasonry placed under control of the Grand Lodge of California. Under American colonial control, the Catholic Church was disestablished as the state church of the Philippines, with the postwar period seeing some churches restored in the Art-Deco style. There was a looming threat of apostasy and schism with the rise of anti-clerical Philippine Freemasonry and the establishment of the Philippine Independent Church due to Filipino anger against Spanish ecclesiastical corruption. In response, Pope Leo XIII in 1902 excommunicated all adherents of the Philippine Independent Church, yet supported Philippine political independence with a policy of reinforcing orthodoxy and reconciliation. This resulted in a majority of Filipinos remaining in full communion with the Holy See, and a good number of those who had left the Church returning.

The result of the First Provincial Council of Manila (1907), restored the Spanish-Empire-Exclusive Cerulean Indult that was in honor of the Immaculate Conception, to the Philippines' Catholic Liturgy, after independence from Spain, and as a reward for the church in the country in staying loyal to Rome, and expanding Roman Catholicism which subsequently also restored the Cerulean Indult to all former Spanish Territories.

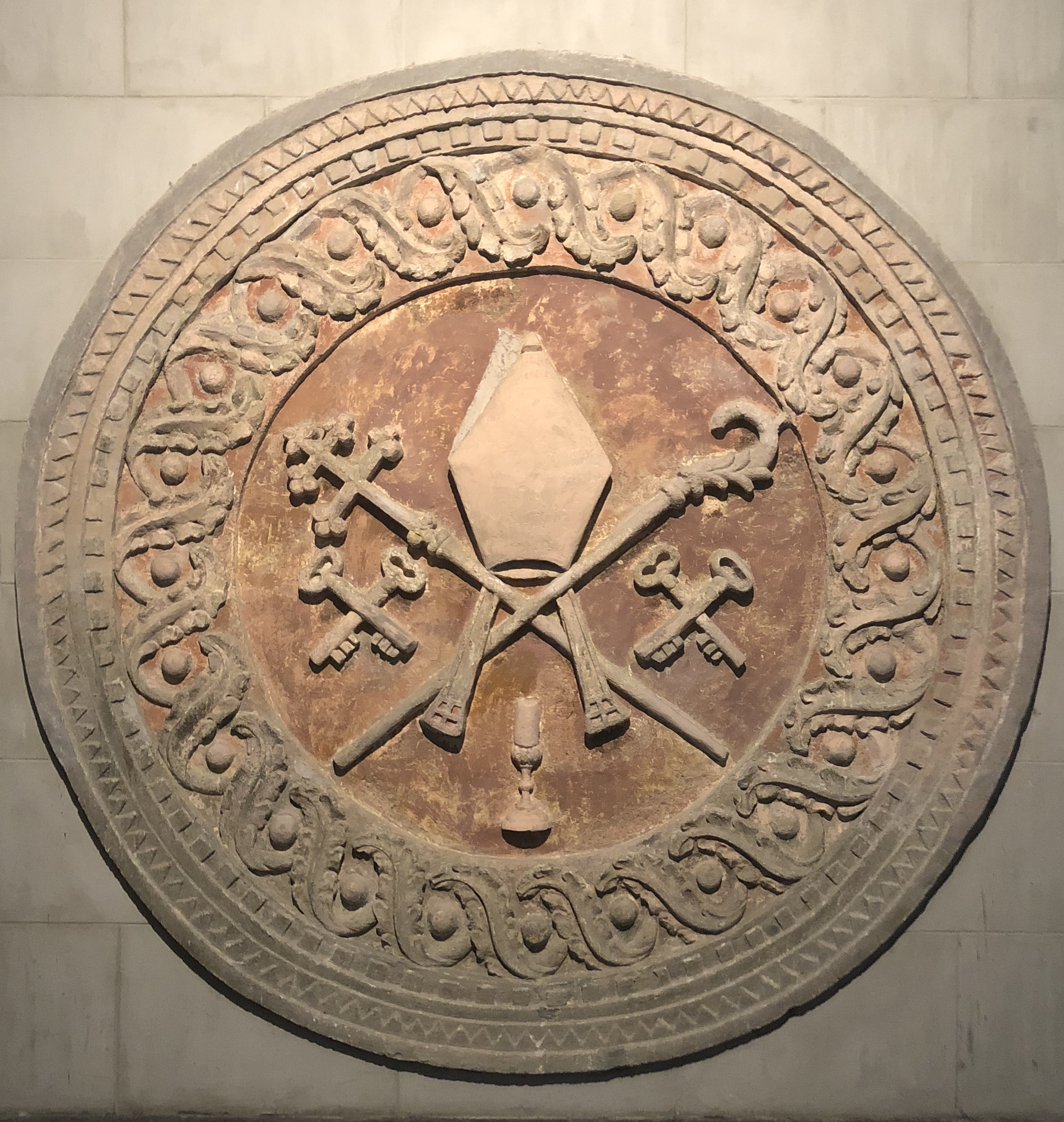
Old Ecclesiastical Seal of the Archdiocese of Manila, used until 1949

On April 10, 1910, Pope Pius X carved out from Manila the Diocese of Lipa, with jurisdiction over the provinces of Batangas, Tayabas, Marinduque, Laguna and Mindoro, and some parts of Masbate. In May 1928, Pope Pius XI established the Diocese of Lingayen, using territory from Manila and Nueva Segovia. In this creation, twenty-six parishes were separated from Manila.

December 8, 1941, marked the beginning of the Japanese occupation of the Philippines. World War II marked a period of irreplaceable loss to the Archdiocese of Manila. The combination of violent theft and arson done by the Japanese and indiscriminate carpet bombing by the Americans during the Battle of Manila (1945) led to the permanent loss of many Gothic, Art-Deco, and Earthquake Baroque churches. Interestingly, then-Father Rufino Jiao Santos (a future Archbishop of Manila) was taken captive by the Japanese, but was saved by combined Filipino and American forces.

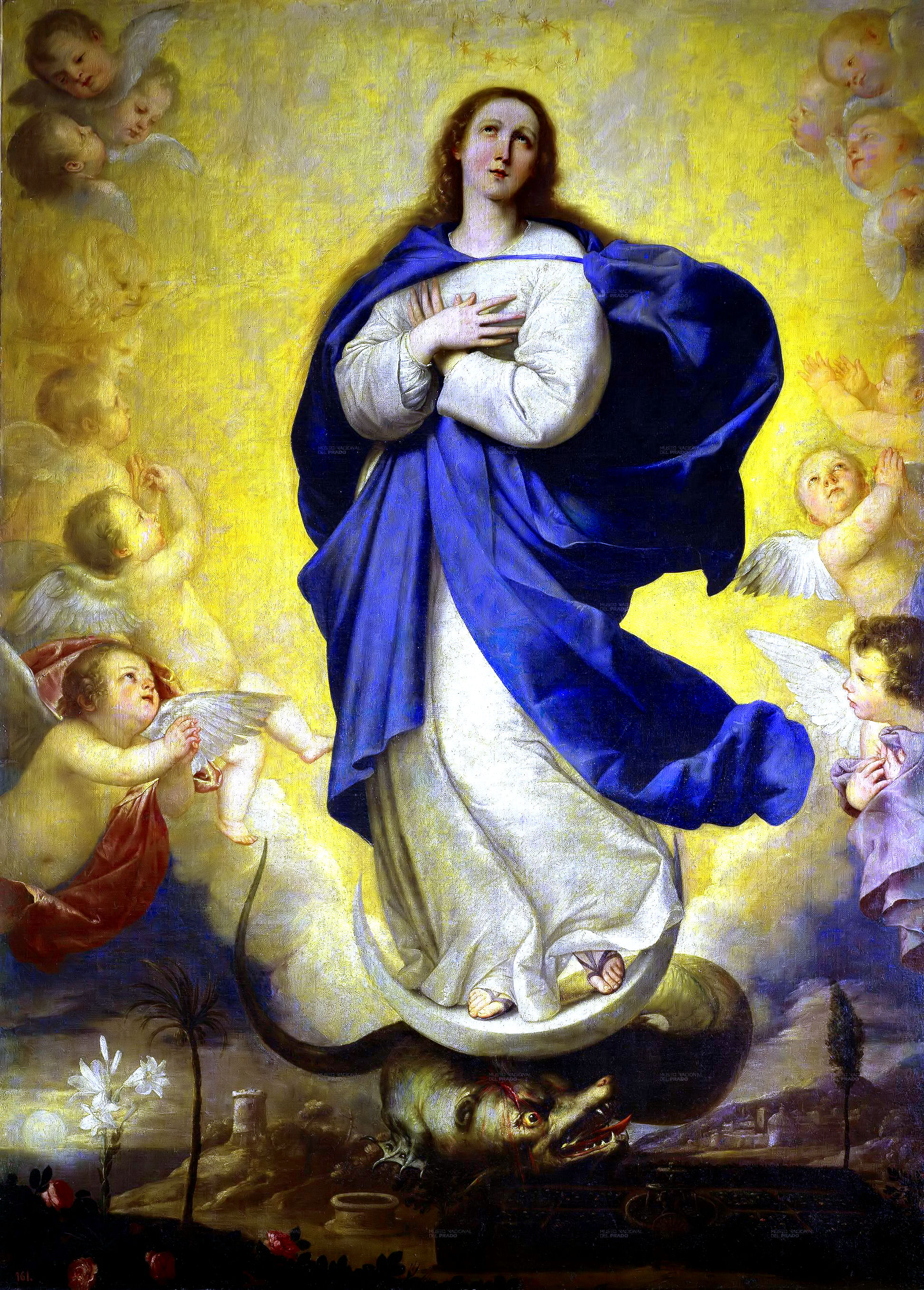
The Virgin Mary as the Immaculate Conception, patroness of the archdiocese

In the aftermath of the war, in September 1942, Pope Pius XII declared Our Lady of Immaculate Conception as the Principal Patroness of the Philippines by virtue of the papal bull, Impositi Nobis, along with Pudentiana and Rose of Lima as secondary patrons.

Due to the heavy damages resulting from World War II, the Manila Cathedral underwent major rebuilding from 1946 to 1958. The Parish of San Miguel served as temporary pro-cathedral until the Manila Cathedral was reopened and consecrated in 1958.

On December 11, 1948, the Apostolic Constitution Probe Noscitur further divided the Archdiocese of Manila by placing the northern part of the local church in the new Diocese of San Fernando. On November 25, 1961, the Archdiocese of Manila was again partitioned with the creation of the Diocese of Malolos for the province of Bulacan in the north and the Diocese of Imus for the province of Cavite to the south.

Pope John Paul II declared the Manila Cathedral a minor basilica in 1981 through the motu proprio Quod ipsum, issued as a papal bull. In 1983, the province of Rizal, the city of Marikina, and northeastern portions of Pasig, were placed under the new Diocese of Antipolo.

The archdiocese witnessed many grace-filled church events such as the Second Synod of Manila (1911), the Third Synod of Manila (1925), the 33rd International Eucharistic Congress (1937), the First Plenary Council of the Philippines (1953), the papal visit of Pope Paul VI (1970), the Fourth Synod of Manila (1979), the papal visits of Pope John Paul II (the first in 1981 and the second in 1995), the National Marian Year (1985), the National Eucharistic Year (1987), the Second Plenary Council of the Philippines (1991), the Second Provincial Council of Manila (1996), the Fourth World Meeting of Families (2003), and the papal visit of Pope Francis (2015).

With the increasing population of the metropolis, Cardinal Jaime Sin, its thirtieth archbishop, requested Pope John Paul II to divide the Archdiocese since according to him, the "ecclesiastical area was too big, too extensive, too populous, and too complex for one archbishop to handle properly". In response, the Vatican carved out two more dioceses from the Archdiocese in 2002: the Diocese of Novaliches and the Diocese of Parañaque. In 2003, three more dioceses were erected: Cubao, Kalookan, and Pasig.

== Coat of arms ==
The arms of the metropolitan see of Manila is an adaptation of the arms granted by Philip II of Spain to the insigne y siempre leal ("distinguished and ever loyal") city of Manila in 1596. The silver crescent represents the Immaculate Conception, patroness of the Manila Cathedral and of the entire Philippines. The tower represents God as described in Psalm 60: turris fortis contra inimicum (turris fortitudinis a facie inimici in the Galician psalter), and its three windows represent the Blessed Trinity: Father, Son and Holy Ghost. The sea lion represents the Philippines, then an ultramar (overseas) territory of Spain, and the pilgrim's cross which may be easily fixed on the ground symbolizes both the faith of the Filipino people and their missionary role in spreading the faith.

== Ordinaries ==
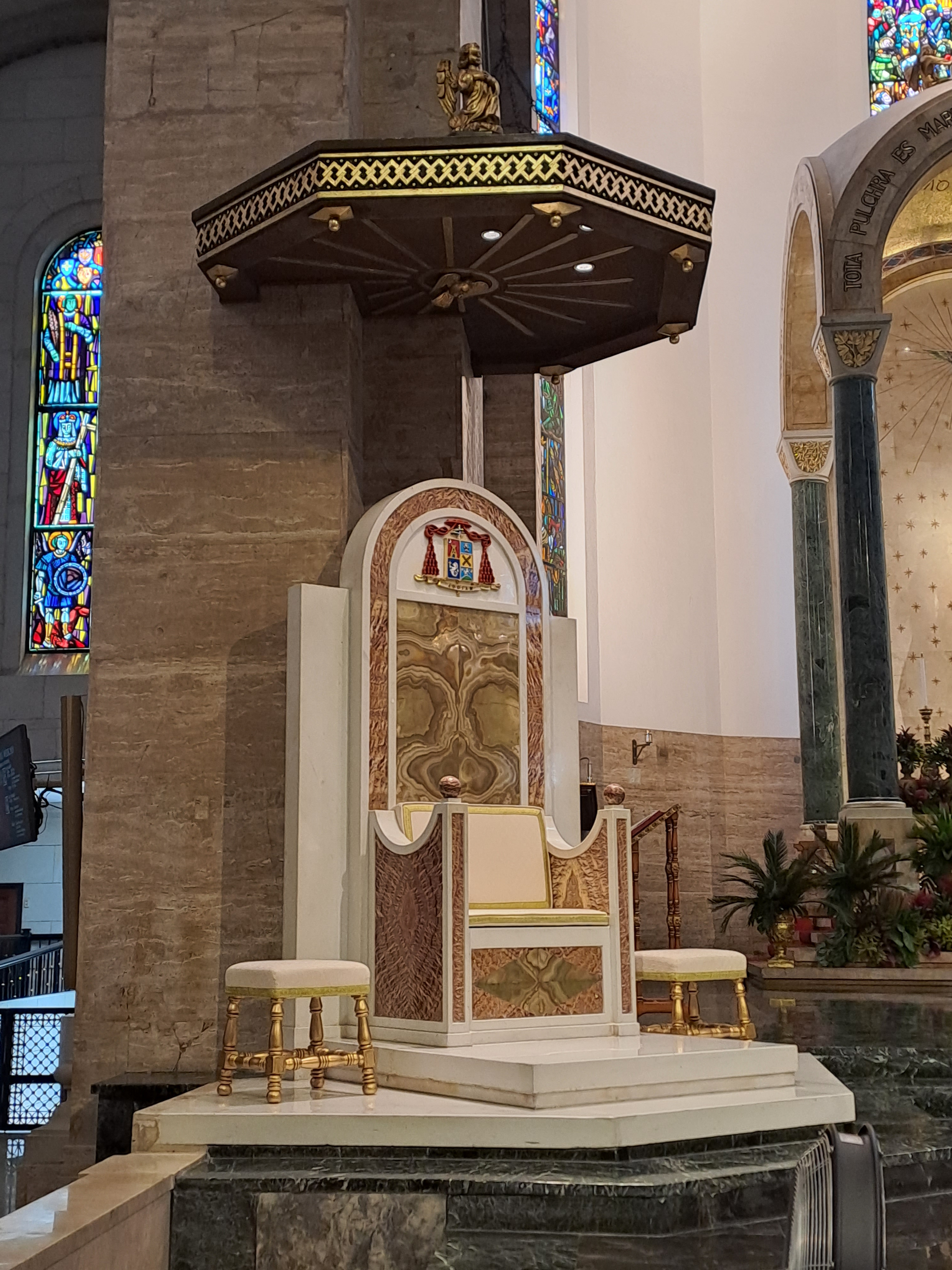
The marble cathedra of the Archbishop of Manila inside Manila Cathedral

=== Archbishops ===
The seat of the archbishop is at Manila Cathedral. As the archdiocese is the mother church of the Philippines due to it being the first diocese to be established in the country, the Archbishop of Manila is widely regarded as de facto primate of the Catholic Church in the Philippines, and the archdiocese has held the title "Metropolitan of the Philippines" (Spanish: Metropolitano de las Islas Filipinas) since its elevation in 1595. Despite those status, the archbishop and archdiocese are equal to other dioceses and archdioceses, and bishops and archbishops including those that are cardinals where they are all subject to the Pope.

After the first Bishop of Manila Domingo de Salazar, the diocese became an archdiocese and there have been nineteen archbishops of Spanish origin. In 1903, the archdiocese received its first American archbishop, Jeremiah James Harty from St. Louis, Missouri. After him, the lone Irishman Michael J. O'Doherty was appointed in 1916, leading the church as Filipinos petitioned for sovereignty from the United States, and through the Japanese occupation during World War II.

When O'Doherty died after Philippine independence in July 1946, coadjutor archbishop Gabriel Reyes became the first native Filipino in the position. Reyes' successor, Archbishop Rufino Jiao Santos, became the first Filipino cardinal in 1960. Since him, all archbishops have been of Filipino origin and are customarily made cardinals.

After the departure of Cardinal-Archbishop Luis Antonio Tagle to become prefect of Congregation for the Evangelization of Peoples on February 9, 2020, Auxiliary Bishop Broderick Pabillo was apostolic administrator for 17 months during the COVID-19 pandemic. Tagle's successor, then-Archbishop of Capiz, Cardinal José Fuerte Advíncula, was installed on June 24, 2021.

No.	Portrait	Name	Period in office	Notes	Coat of arms
Bishops of Manila (February 6, 1579 – August 14, 1595)
1		Domingo de Salazar, O.P.	February 6, 1579 – December 4, 1594 (15 years, 301 days)	Died in office	
Metropolitan Archbishops of Manila (August 14, 1595 – present)
2		Ignacio Santibáñez, O.F.M.	August 30, 1595 – August 14, 1598 (2 years, 349 days)	First archbishop, died in office	
3		Miguel de Benavides, O.P.	October 7, 1602 – July 26, 1605 (2 years, 292 days)	Died in office	
4		Diego Vázquez de Mercado	May 28, 1608 – June 12, 1616 (8 years, 15 days)	Died in office	
5		Miguel García Serrano, O.E.S.A.	February 12, 1618 – June 14, 1629 (11 years, 122 days)	Died in office	
6		Hernándo Guerrero, O.E.S.A.	January 9, 1634 – July 1, 1641 (7 years, 173 days)	Died in office	
7		Fernando Montero Espinosa	February 5, 1646 – 1648 (approximately 2 years)	Died in office	
8		Miguel de Poblete Casasola	June 21, 1649 – December 8, 1667 (18 years, 170 days)	Died in office	
9		Juan López Galván, O.P.	November 14, 1672 – February 12, 1674 (1 year, 90 days)	Died in office	
10		Felipe Fernández de Pardo, O.P.	January 8, 1680 – December 31, 1689 (9 years, 357 days)	Died in office	
11		Diego Camacho y Ávila	November 28, 1695 – January 14, 1704 (8 years, 47 days)	Appointed Archbishop (in personam)-Bishop of Guadalajara	
12		Francisco de la Cuesta, O.S.H.	April 28, 1704 – September 23, 1723 (19 years, 148 days)	Appointed Archbishop (in personam)-Bishop of Michoacán	
13		Carlos Bermúdez de Castro	November 20, 1724 – November 13, 1729 (4 years, 358 days)	Died in office	
14		Juan Ángel Rodríguez, O.SS.T.	December 17, 1731 – June 24, 1742 (10 years, 189 days)	Died in office	
15		Pedro José Manuel Martínez de Arizala, O.F.M.	February 3, 1744 – May 28, 1755 (11 years, 114 days)	Died in office	
16		Manuel Antonio Rojo del Río Vera	December 19, 1757 – January 30, 1764 (6 years, 42 days)	Died in office	
17		Basílio Tomás Sancho Hernándo (de Santas Justa y Rufina), Sch. P.	April 14, 1766 – December 15, 1787 (21 years, 245 days)	Died in office	
18		Juan Antonio Gallego Orbigo, O.F.M. Disc.	December 15, 1788 – May 17, 1797 (8 years, 153 days)	Died in office	
19		Juan Antonio Zulaibar, O.P.	March 26, 1804 – March 4, 1824 (19 years, 344 days)	Died in office	
20		Hilarión Díez, O.E.S.A.	July 3, 1826 – May 7, 1829 (2 years, 308 days)	Died in office	
21		José Seguí, O.E.S.A.	July 5, 1830 – July 4, 1845 (14 years, 364 days)	Died in office	
22		José Julián de Aranguren, O.A.R.	January 19, 1846 – April 18, 1861 (15 years, 89 days)	Died in office	
23		Gregorio Melitón Martínez Santa Cruz	December 23,1861– September 30, 1875 (13 years, 281 days)	Resigned	
24	Pedro Payo , O.P. (1876 - 1889 )	Pedro Payo y Piñiero	January 28, 1876 – January 1, 1889 (12 years, 339 days)	Died in office	
25		Bernardino Nozaleda y Villa, O.P.	May 27, 1889 – February 4, 1902 (12 years, 253 days)	Resigned; subsequently appointed Arcbishop of Valencia	
26		Jeremiah James Harty	June 6, 1903 – May 16, 1916 (12 years, 345 days)	Appointed Bishop of Omaha	
27		Michael J. O'Doherty	September 6, 1916 – October 13, 1949 (33 years, 37 days)	Longest-serving Archbishop of Manila; died in office	
28		Gabriel M. Reyes	October 13, 1949 – October 10, 1952 (2 years, 363 days)	First native Filipino Archbishop of Manila; died in office	
29		Rufino J. Cardinal Santos	March 25, 1953 – September 3, 1973 (20 years, 162 days)	First Filipino cardinal; died in office	
30		Jaime L. Cardinal Sin, O.F.S.	March 19, 1974 – November 21, 2003 (29 years, 247 days)	Retired	
31		Gaudencio B. Cardinal Rosales	November 21, 2003 – December 12, 2011 (8 years, 21 days)	Retired	
32		Luis Antonio G. Cardinal Tagle	December 12, 2011 – February 9, 2020 (8 years, 59 days)	Appointed Prefect of the Congregation for the Evangelization of Peoples Became Dean of the College of Cardinals in 2026.	
33		Jose F. Cardinal Advíncula, O.P.	June 24, 2021 – (5 years, 150 days)		

=== Coadjutor archbishops ===
No.	Portrait	Period in office	Until	Notes
1		Romualdo J. Ballesteros, O.P.	June 20, 1845 – January 19, 1846 (213 days)	Did not succeed to see; subsequently appointed Bishop of Cebu.
2		Gabriel M. Reyes	August 25, 1949 – October 13, 1949 (49 days)	Succeeded Archbishop Michael O'Doherty

=== Auxiliary bishops ===
No.	Picture	Name	Period in office	Titular see	Notes	Coat of arms
1		Ginés Barrientos, O.P.	April 9, 1680 – November 13, 1698 (18 years, 218 days)	Troas	First known auxiliary bishop	
2		William Finnemann, S.V.D.	May 21, 1929 – December 4, 1936 (7 years, 197 days)	Sora	Appointed Prefect of Mindoro	
3		Cesar Maria Guerrero	December 16, 1937 – May 14, 1949 (11 years, 149 days)	Limisa	Appointed Bishop of San Fernando.	
4		Rufino J. Santos	October 24, 1947 – February 10, 1953 (5 years, 109 days)	Barca	Appointed Military Vicar of the Philippines, later the 26th Archbishop of Manila.	
5		Vicente P. Reyes	August 24, 1950 – January 19, 1961 (10 years, 148 days)	Aspona	Appointed Bishop of Borongan	
6		Hernando Antiporda	October 28, 1954 – December 13, 1975 (21 years, 46 days)	Edessa in Macedonia	Died in office	
7		Pedro Bantigue y Natividad	July 25, 1961 – January 26, 1967 (5 years, 185 days)	Catula	Appointed Bishop of San Pablo.	
8		Bienvenido M. Lopez	January 22, 1967 – April 27, 1995 (28 years, 95 days)	Muteci	Longest-serving auxiliary bishop of Manila.	
9		Artemio G. Casas	September 4, 1968 – May 11, 1974 (5 years, 249 days)	Macriana Minor	Appointed Bishop of Imus.	
10		Amado Paulino y Hernandez	May 27, 1969 – March 9, 1985 (15 years, 286 days)	Carinola	Died in office	
11		Gaudencio B. Rosales	October 28, 1974 – June 9, 1982 (7 years, 224 days)	Oescus	Appointed Coadjutor of Malaybalay, later returned as archbishop	
12		Oscar V. Cruz	May 3, 1976 – May 22, 1978 (2 years, 19 days)	Martirano	Appointed Archbishop of San Fernando	
13		Leonardo Z. Legaspi, O.P.	August 8, 1977 – October 20, 1983 (6 years, 73 days)	Elephantaria in Mauretania	Appointed Archbishop of Caceres.	
14		Protacio G. Gungon	August 24, 1977 – January 24, 1983 (5 years, 153 days)	Obba	Appointed Bishop of Antipolo	
15		Manuel C. Sobreviñas	May 25, 1979 – February 25, 1993 (13 years, 276 days)	Tulana	Appointed Bishop of Imus.	
16		Gabriel V. Reyes	April 3, 1981 – November 21, 1992 (11 years, 232 days)	Selsea	Appointed Bishop of Kalibo.	
17		Teodoro J. Buhain Jr.	February 21, 1983 – September 23, 2003 (20 years, 214 days)	Bacanaria	Retired from office	
18		Juan B. Velasco Díaz, O.P.	May 1983 – July 9, 1984 (approximately 1 year)	—N/a	Appointed Bishop of Xiamen.	
19		Teodoro C. Bacani, O.P.	April 12, 1984 – December 7, 2002 (18 years, 239 days)	Gauriana	Appointed Bishop of Novaliches	
20		Leoncio L. Lat	1985 – December 12, 1992 (approximately 6 years)	Gauriana	Retired from office	
21		Ramon C. Argüelles	January 6, 1994 – August 25, 1995 (1 year, 231 days)	Ros Cré	Appointed Bishop of the Military Ordinariate of the Philippines.	
22		Crisostomo A. Yalung	May 31, 1994 – October 18, 2001 (7 years, 140 days)	Ficus	Appointed Bishop of Antipolo.	
23		Rolando Joven T. Tirona, O.C.D.	December 29, 1994 – December 14, 1996 (1 year, 351 days)	Vulturaria	Appointed Bishop of Malolos.	
24		Jesse E. Mercado	March 31, 1997 – December 7, 2002 (5 years, 251 days)	Talaptula	Appointed Bishop of Parañaque.	
25		Socrates B. Villegas, O.P.	August 31, 2001 – July 3, 2004 (2 years, 307 days)	Nona	Appointed Bishop of Balanga.	
26		Bernardino C. Cortez	August 20, 2004 – October 27, 2014 (10 years, 68 days)	Bladia	Appointed Prelate of Infanta.	
27		Broderick S. Pabillo, S.D.B.	August 19, 2006 – June 29, 2021 (14 years, 314 days)	Sitifis	Appointed Vicar Apostolic of Taytay	

== Priests of this archdiocese who became bishops ==
- Francisco Sales Reyes y Alicante – appointed Bishop of the Archdiocese of Nueva Caceres (now Archdiocese of Caceres) in 1925
- Artemio Gabriel Casas – appointed first Bishop of Imus in 1961; later appointed as Archbishop of Jaro
- Felix Paz Perez – appointed second Bishop of Imus in 1969
- Antonio Tobias – appointed auxiliary bishop of Zamboanga in 1982, then Bishop of Pagadian (1984–1993), Bishop of San Fernando de La Union (1993–2003), and finally Bishop of Novaliches until his retirement in 2019.
- Francisco Capiral San Diego – appointed Coadjutor Vicar Apostolic of Palawan in 1983, then became Apostolic Vicar of Puerto Princesa (1987–1995), Bishop of San Pablo, Laguna (1995–2003), and later, the first Bishop of the Diocese of Pasig (2003–2010).
- Francisco Mendoza de Leon – Auxiliary Bishop of the Diocese of Antipolo (2007–2015), became its coadjutor (2015), and its fourth diocesan bishop (2016–2023).
- Socrates Villegas, O.P. – third Bishop of Balanga (May 3, 2004 – November 4, 2009) and fourth Archbishop of Lingayen-Dagupan (November 4, 2009 – present)
- Ruperto Santos, fourth Bishop of Balanga (April 1, 2010 – July 22, 2023) and fifth Bishop of Antipolo (July 22, 2023 – present)
- Roberto Gaa, 3rd Bishop of the Diocese of Novaliches (August 24, 2019 – present)
- Jose Alan Dialogo, 5th Bishop of the Diocese of Sorsogon (October 15, 2019 – present)
- Arnaldo Catalan, Apostolic Nuncio to Rwanda (January 31, 2022 – present)
- Rufino Sescon, O.P. – fifth Bishop of Balanga (March 1, 2025 – present)

== Suffragan dioceses and bishops ==
Diocese	Image	Bishop	Period in Office	Coat of Arms
Antipolo (Rizal and Marikina City)		Ruperto C. Santos	July 22, 2023 – present (3 years, 122 days)	
Cubao (Quezon City)		Elias L. Ayuban, C.M.F.	December 3, 2024 – present (1 year, 353 days)	
Imus (Cavite)		Reynaldo G. Evangelista, O.F.S.	June 5, 2013 – present (13 years, 169 days)	
Kalookan (South Caloocan, Malabon City, and Navotas City)		Pablo Virgilio S. Cardinal David	January 2, 2016 –present (10 years, 323 days)	
Malolos (Bulacan and Valenzuela City)		Dennis C. Villarojo	August 21, 2019 – present (7 years, 92 days)	
Novaliches (Quezon City and North Caloocan)		Roberto O. Gaa	August 24, 2019 – present (7 years, 89 days)	
Parañaque (Parañaque City, Las Piñas City, and Muntinlupa City)		Sede vacante	Since June 6, 2026 (168 days)	
Pasig (Pasig City, Pateros, and Taguig City)		Mylo Hubert C. Vergara	June 23, 2011 – present (15 years, 151 days)	
San Pablo (Laguna)		Marcelino Antonio M. Maralit	November 21, 2024 – present (2 years, 0 days)	

== Vicariates, Parishes, Chaplaincies, and Mission Stations ==
The archdiocese has 13 Vicariates.

=== Vicariate of Espiritu Santo ===
1. Archdiocesan Shrine of Espiritu Santo, Santa Cruz, Manila
2. Immaculate Conception Parish, Tondo, Manila
3. San Roque de Manila Parish, Santa Cruz, Manila
4. St. Joseph Parish, Gagalangin, Tondo, Manila
5. San Jose Manggagawa Parish, Manuguit, Tondo, Manila
6. Santa Monica Parish, Tondo, Manila
7. Risen Christ Parish, Tondo, Manila

=== Vicariate of the Holy Family ===
1. National Shrine of Our Lady of the Abandoned, Santa Ana, Manila
2. St. Anthony of Padua Parish, Singalong, San Andres, Manila
3. Sagrada Familia Parish, San Andres, Manila
4. Parokya ng Ina ng Laging Saklolo, Punta, Santa Ana, Manila
5. Santisima Trinidad Parish, Malate, Manila
6. Saint Pius X Parish, San Andres, Manila

=== Vicariate of San Jose de Trozo ===
1. Minor Basilica and National Shrine of Jesus Nazareno, St. John the Baptist Parish (Quiapo Church)
2. Minor Basilica of San Sebastian, Quiapo, Manila
3. National Shrine of Saint Jude Thaddeus, Malacañang Compound
4. National Shrine of Saint Michael and the Archangels, Malacañang Compound
5. Minor Basilica of Our Lady of the Pillar, Archdiocesan Shrine of the Blessed Sacrament (Sta. Cruz Parish)
6. Archdiocesan Shrine of Saint Joseph, San Jose de Trozo Parish, Tondo, Manila

=== Vicariate of Our Lady of Loreto ===
1. National Shrine and Parish of Our Lady of Loreto, Sampaloc, Manila
2. Saint Anthony Shrine, Sampaloc, Manila
3. Most Holy Trinity Parish, Balic-Balic, Sampaloc, Manila
4. Archdiocesan Shrine and Parish of Nuestra Señora del Perpetuo Soccoro, Sampaloc, Manila
5. Santisimo Rosario Parish, University of Santo Tomas, Sampaloc, Manila
6. Sacred Heart of Jesus Parish, Santa Mesa, Manila
7. Nuestra Señora del Salvacion Parish, Santa Mesa, Manila
8. Our Lady of Fatima Parish, Bacood St., Santa Mesa, Manila
9. San Roque de Sampaloc Parish, Santa Mesa, Manila

=== Vicariate of Santo Niño ===
1. Minor Basilica and Archdiocesan Shrine of Santo Niño de Tondo, Manila
2. Minor Basilica and National Shrine of San Lorenzo Ruiz, Binondo, Manila
3. Our Lady of the Most Holy Rosary Chinese Parish, Binondo, Manila
4. Nuestra Señora de la Soledad de Manila Parish, Binondo, Manila
5. San Pablo Apostol Parish, Tondo, Manila
6. Our Lady of Peace and Good Voyage Parish, Tondo, Manila
7. Saint John Bosco Parish, Tondo, Manila

=== Vicariate of Nuestra Señora de Guia ===
1. Minor Basilica and Metropolitan Cathedral of the Immaculate Conception (Manila Cathedral), Intramuros, Manila
2. Archdiocesan Shrine of Nuestra Señora de la Consolacion y Correa, Immaculate Conception Parish (San Agustin Church), Intramuros
3. Archdiocesan Shrine of Our Lady of the Miraculous Medal, San Vicente de Paul Parish, San Marcelino St., Ermita, Manila
4. Archdiocesan Shrine of Nuestra Señora de Guia, Ermita, Manila
5. Our Lady of Remedies Parish, Malate, Manila
6. Our Lady of the Assumption Parish, Malate, Manila
7. Santo Niño de Baseco Parish, Port Area, Manila

=== Vicariate of San Fernando de Dilao ===
1. San Fernando de Dilao Parish, Paco, Manila
2. Saint Peter the Apostle Parish, Paco, Manila
3. Santa Maria Goretti Parish, Paco, Manila
4. Our Lady of Peñafrancia Parish and Archdiocesan Shrine, Paco, Manila
5. Santo Niño de Pandacan Parish, Pandacan, Manila

=== Vicariate of Saints Peter and Paul ===
1. Saints Peter and Paul Parish, Barangay Poblacion, Makati City
2. Saint Andrew the Apostle Parish, Barangay Bel-Air, Makati City
3. Nuestra Señora de Gracia Church, Barangay Guadalupe Viejo, Makati City
4. Holy Cross Parish, Barangay Tejeros, Makati City
5. Our Lady of La Paz Parish, Barangay La Paz, Makati City
6. National Shrine of the Sacred Heart, Barangay San Antonio, Makati City
7. Saint John Bosco Parish, Barangay Pio del Pilar, Makati City

=== Vicariate of Saint Joseph the Worker ===
1. Saint Joseph the Worker Parish, Barangay Palanan, Makati City
2. Holy Family Parish, Barangay San Isidro, Makati City
3. San Ildefonso Parish, Barangay Pio del Pilar, Makati City
4. Our Lady of Fatima Parish, Barangay Bangkal, Makati City
5. Saint Alphonsus Mary de Ligouri Parish, Barangay Magallanes, Makati City

=== Vicariate of Our Lady of Guadalupe ===
1. National Shrine of Our Lady of Guadalupe, Barangay Guadalupe Nuevo, Makati City
2. Santuario de San Antonio Parish, Barangay Forbes Park, Makati City
3. Saint John Mary Vianney Parish, Barangay Cembo, Taguig City
4. Santa Teresita Parish, Barangay West Rembo, Taguig City
5. Mater Dolorosa Parish, Barangay East Rembo, Taguig City
6. Mary, Mirror of Justice Parish, Barangay Comembo, Taguig City
7. Saint John of the Cross Parish, Barangay Pembo, Taguig City

=== Vicariate of San Felipe Neri ===
1. San Felipe Neri Parish, Pobacion, Mandaluyong City
2. Our Lady of Fatima Parish, Highway Hills, Mandaluyong City
3. Archdiocesan Shrine of the Divine Mercy, Maysilo Circle, Mandaluyong City
4. Parish of Our Lady of the Abandoned Parish, Hulo, Mandaluyong City
5. Sacred Heart of Jesus Parish, Addition Hills, Mandaluyong City
6. San Roque de Mandaluyong Parish, Barangka Ilaya, Mandaluyong City
7. St. Dominic Savio Parish, Pag-Asa, Mandaluyong City

=== Vicariate of Saint John the Baptist ===
1. National Shrine of Mary, Queen of Peace (EDSA Shrine), Quezon City
2. Archdiocesan Shrine of Saint John the Baptist (Pinaglabanan Church), San Juan City
3. Santuario de San Jose Parish, East Greenhills, Mandaluyong City
4. Mary the Queen Parish, San Juan City
5. Santuario del Santo Cristo Parish, San Juan City

=== Vicariate of Santa Clara de Montefalco ===
1. Archdiocesan Shrine of Jesus the Way, the Truth, and the Life, Pasay City
2. Our Lady of Fatima Parish, Pasay City
3. Our Lady of Sorrows Parish, FB Harrison Street, Pasay City
4. Our Lady of the Airways Parish, Pasay City
5. San Isidro Labrador Parish, Taft Avenue, Pasay City
6. San Juan Nepumuceno Parish, Malibay, Pasay City
7. San Rafael Arkanghel Parish, Park Avenue, Pasay City
8. San Roque Parish, Pasay City
9. Santa Clara de Montefalco Parish, P. Burgos St., Pasay City
10. Our Lady of the Most Blessed Sacrament Parish, Pasay City
11. Mary, Comforter of the Afflicted Parish, Pasay City

=== Mission Stations and Chaplaincies under the Archdiocese of Manila ===
1. Mary, Mother of Hope Mission Station, Barangay San Lorenzo, Makati City
  1. Mary Mother of Hope Chapel, Landmark Makati
  2. Our Lady of the Most Holy Rosary Chapel, SM Makati
2. Santo Niño de Paz Mission Station, Greenbelt, Barangay San Lorenzo, Makati City
3. Chapel of the Most Sacred Heart of Jesus, Power Plant Mall, Rockwell Center, Makati City
4. Saint John Paul II Mission Station, Villa San Miguel, Mandaluyong City
5. Chapel of the Eucharistic Lord, SM Megamall, Mandaluyong City
6. Santa Elena Mission Station, Nagtahan, Santa Mesa, Manila
7. Our Lady of the Miraculous Medal Chapel, National Center for Mental Health, Mandaluyong City
8. Our Lady of the Miraculous Medal Chapel, Cardinal Santos Medical Center, San Juan City
9. Chapel of St. Lazarus, Department of Health (Philippines), Rizal Avenue, Santa Cruz, Manila
10. Our Lady of Guadalupe Chapel, Makati Medical Center, Barangay San Lorenzo, Makati City

== Formation of priests ==
The archdiocese administers San Carlos Seminary, the archdiocesan major seminary which caters to the formation of future priests for the archdiocese and for its suffragan dioceses. Located in Guadalupe Viejo, Makati, it has a pre-college program (senior high school and formation year), a college program (A.B., philosophy), and a graduate school (master's program in theology or pastoral ministry), as well as a formation houses for future priests committed to serve the Filipino-Chinese communities in the country (Lorenzo Ruiz Mission Society) and a center for adult vocations (Holy Apostles Senior Seminary). The archdiocese also operates Our Lady of Guadalupe Minor Seminary for young men at the secondary school level. It is located a few blocks from San Carlos Seminary.

== Schools ==
The Roman Catholic Archbishop of Manila Educational System (RCAMES) comprises 27 archdiocesan and parochial schools. The archbishop of Manila exercises authority in each member school and appoints a superintendent for the entire system to implement decisions and resolve issues. The member schools are:

=== Cluster I ===
- Paco Catholic School
- St. Joseph's School – Pandacan
- St. Pius X Parochial School

=== Cluster II ===
- Holy Family Parochial School
- Saint Anthony School
- Saint Peter the Apostle School

=== Cluster III ===
- Jaime Cardinal Sin Learning Center
- Sacred Heart of Jesus Catholic School
- San Felipe Neri Parochial School

=== Cluster IV ===
- Holy Trinity Academy
- Nazarene Catholic School
- Our Lady of Fatima Parochial Educational Center, Inc.

=== Cluster V ===
- Espiritu Santo Parochial School
- Saint Joseph School - Gagalangin
- San Pablo Apostol Learning Center

=== Cluster VI ===
- Holy Child Catholic School
- Manila Cathedral School
- San Rafael Parochial School

=== Cluster VII ===
- Guadalupe Catholic School
- Saint John the Baptist Catholic School of San Juan, Inc.
- San Isidro Catholic School
- Our Lady of Guadalupe Minor Seminary

=== Cluster VIII ===
- Ermita Catholic School
- Malate Catholic School
- Santa Clara Parish School

== See also ==
- List of Catholic dioceses in the Philippines
- Catholic Church in the Philippines
- The Royal and Conciliar San Carlos Seminary
