= Diocese of Novaliches =

Roman Catholic diocese in the Philippines

Diocese of Novaliches Diocesis Novalichesina Diyosesis ng Novaliches Diócesis de Novaliches

Catholic
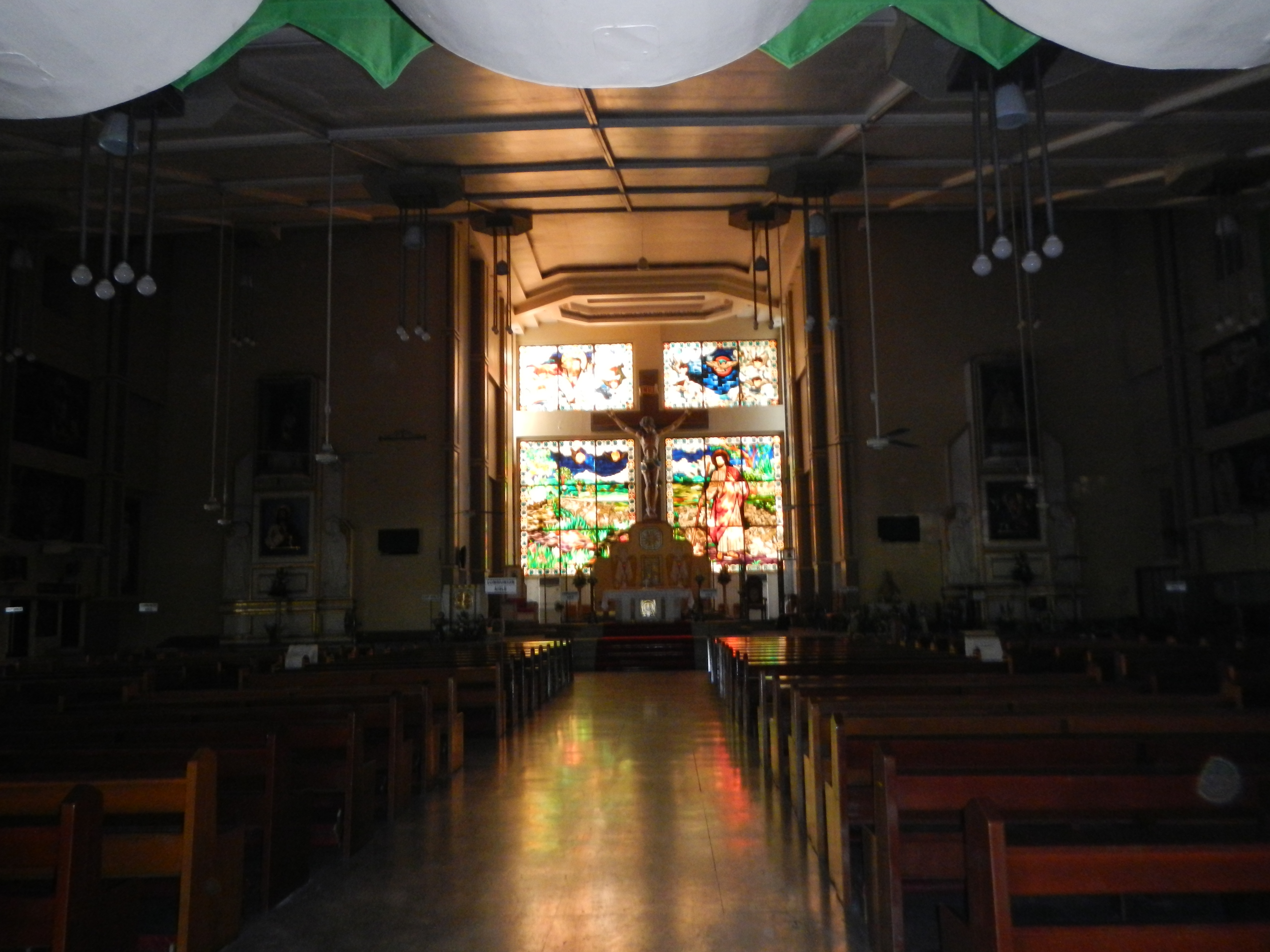
- Novaliches Cathedral

- Coat of arms

Location
- Country: Philippines
- Territory: Quezon City; District 2; District 3 (Barangay Matandang Balara); District 5; District 6 (northern Culiat, northern Tandang Sora, Pasong Tamo, Sauyo, and Talipapa); Caloocan (North); Caloocan (South); Barangay 164
- Ecclesiastical province: Manila
- Metropolitan: Manila
- Coordinates: 14°41′51″N 121°04′03″E

Statistics
- Area: 138 km^{2} (53 sq mi)
- Population: Total; Catholics: (as of 2021); 3,082,257; 2,404,161 (78%)
- Parishes: 73
- Schools: 9

Information
- Denomination: Catholic
- Sui iuris church: Latin Church
- Rite: Roman Rite
- Established: December 7, 2002
- Cathedral: Cathedral-Shrine and Parish of the Good Shepherd
- Patron: Christ, the Good Shepherd; Our Lady of Mercy
- Secular priests: 53

Current leadership
- Pope: Leo XIV
- Bishop: Roberto Gaa
- Metropolitan Archbishop: Jose Advincula
- Vicar General: Jesus-Romulo C. Rañada (for administration); Antonio E. Labiao, Jr. (for pastoral affairs)
- Bishops emeritus: Teodoro Bacani Jr. Antonio Tobias

The Diocese of Novaliches (Latin: Dioecesis Novalichesina; Filipino: Diyosesis ng Novaliches) is a diocese of the Latin Church of the Catholic Church in the Philippines. The diocese was created by Pope John Paul II on December 7, 2002, by virtue of his Apostolic Constitution Animarum Utilitati, and was canonically erected on January 16, 2003, from the Archdiocese of Manila. The diocese previously existed as the Ecclesiastical District of Quezon City-North, which was renamed the District of Novaliches in 2002.

As of May 2024, the diocese is composed of 71 full-fledged parishes (seven of which are diocesan shrines) and one mission area, clustered into twelve vicariates. The diocese's principal patron is Jesus, the Good Shepherd named after the cathedral of the same name, and patroness is Blessed Virgin Mary under the title Our Lady of Mercy.

== Territorial jurisdiction ==
The diocese encompasses northern Caloocan, Barangay 164 of southern Caloocan, and the northern part of Quezon City, starting from Tandang Sora Avenue leading northward and comprising District 2 (all barangays), District 3 (Barangay Matandang Balara), District 5 (all barangays), and some barangays in District 6 namely: Pasong Tamo, Sauyo, and Talipapa, including portions of Tandang Sora and Culiat found north of Tandang Sora Avenue.

== History ==
The history of the Diocese of Novaliches can be traced to the creation of the town of Novaliches in the 1800s during the Spanish colonization period in the Philippines. General Manuel Pavía was named Governor-General of the Philippine Islands. He arrived in Manila in 1854 with the task of establishing a penal colony where prisoners would be granted lands they would develop in exchange for their release. The colony was given the name Hacienda Tala since the once heavily forested area became identical to one where a star ("tala") had fallen after clearing. This hacienda grew into a larger community that eventually merged with the haciendas of Malinta and Piedad in forming the independent town of Novaliches on January 26, 1856.

Novaliches (which present-day area is now shared by Quezon City and Caloocan) became part of the Province of Bulacan until 1858, when it was annexed to the Province of Manila. The name Novaliches came from the name of a small village 60 kilometers away from the city of Valencia, Spain, that was awarded to General Pavía, who was given the title Marqués of Novaliches by Queen Isabella II in 1840 for having defended her from the claims of her uncle Prince Carlos during the First Carlist War (1833–1839).

Soon after the establishment of the new town, Manila Archbishop José Julián de Aranguren decreed the creation of its parish on September 24, 1856. The chapel of the Corpus Christi was elevated to the status of a parroquia (parish church) and Andres Martin, an Augustinian priest from Spain, was appointed as the first parish priest. The parish church was dedicated in honor of Nuestra Senora de la Merced (Our Lady of Mercy). However, the church was burned during the Philippine Revolution of 1896, and the assigned Augustinian priests returned to Spain. The parcel of land where the parroquia once stood was donated to the Archdiocese of Manila. In 1899, Novaliches ceded its township to the Municipality of Caloocan. It was in 1928 when the parish was restored with the appointment of a diocesan parish priest, Father Victor Raymundo.

In 1962, following the canonical erection of the Dioceses of Imus and Malolos from the Archdiocese of Manila, the Our Lady of Mercy Parish stood as the only existing parish in the area now belonging to the Diocese of Novaliches. Before Cardinal Santos' death in 1973, a new parish was erected: the Our Lady of Fatima Parish in Urduja Village, Caloocan. The growth of the Catholic faith in the area would be evidenced by the establishment of parishes in Fairview (1975), Lagro (1977), and Bagbag (1978) – which took place during the early years of leadership of Cardinal Jaime L. Sin, Archbishop of Manila.

Cardinal Sin divided Quezon City into four vicariates on December 3, 1974. These are the Vicariates of Santa Rita, Holy Family, Saint Joseph, and Santo Nino. Our Lady of Mercy Parish was placed under the Vicariate of Santo Nino, along with parishes of Santo Niño (Bagobantay), Our Lady of Mount Carmel (Project 6), Our Lady of Perpetual Help (Project 8), and Our Lady of Hope (Pag-Asa), which presently belong to the Diocese of Cubao. On August 10, 1987, the Ecclesiastical District of Quezon City was divided into two: Quezon City-North and Quezon City-South. The new Ecclesiastical District of Quezon City-North comprised the Vicariates of Good Shepherd, Our Lady of Mercy, Ascension of Our Lord, and Saint Joseph, although some parishes belonging to the present-day Diocese of Novaliches were still belonging to the Vicariate of Our Lady of Perpetual Help in the southern district at that time.

Following the appointment of Quezon City-North District Bishop Francisco Claver as Apostolic Vicar of Bontoc-Lagawe, Manila, Auxiliary Bishop Teodoro C. Bacani was designated by Cardinal Sin to head the two districts of KALMANA (Kalookan-Malabon-Navotas) and Quezon City-North. Bacani designated Alfonso Bugaoan Jr, parish priest of Saint Joseph Parish in Project 3, as his Episcopal Vicar for Quezon City-North.

The Ecclesiastical District of Quezon City-North was renamed District of Novaliches on March 15, 2002, in preparation for the creation of new dioceses in Metro Manila as response to the growing number of Catholic faithful. Pope John Paul II established the Diocese of Novaliches on December 7, 2002, by virtue of the apostolic constitution Animarum Utilitati and appointed Bacani as its first residential bishop. This news was announced by Cardinal Sin during a conference of the clergy and lay leaders held at Villa San Miguel in Mandaluyong. The decree also declared that the episcopal seat of the new diocese would be the archdiocesan shrine and Parish of the Good Shepherd along Regalado Avenue, Fairview, Quezon City. The episcopal seat serves as the residence of the bishop and the center of all activities in the diocese.

In solemn rites held at the Good Shepherd Parish-Shrine on January 16, 2003, the new Diocese of Novaliches was canonically erected, with Bacani being installed as its first bishop, coinciding his 63rd birthday. He named Gerardo Giovanni Tapiador as the diocese's first vicar-general, Jaime Lara as chancellor, and James Gaa as Oeconomus or treasurer. Bacani led the beginnings of the pastoral commissions or ministries in the diocese through the involvement of active lay members of the Council of the Laity of Novaliches (CLaN), which he created on March 21, 2003. These lay leaders represented the different sectors of the church active since the time of the Ecclesiastical District of Quezon City-North. On May 8, 2003, Bacani left a legacy of establishing the first parish under the new diocese – Santa Krus Parish in Bagumbong, Caloocan.

However, Bacani resigned in November 25, 2003. San Fernando, La Union Bishop Antonio Tobias, who served as Apostolic Administrator in Bacani's absence from June to November of that year, was named second bishop of Novaliches. He was installed at the Good Shepherd Cathedral on January 26, 2004, in the presence of Cardinal Sin, Apostolic Nuncio Archbishop Antonio Franco, and Manila Archbishop Gaudencio Rosales. Tobias convened the first Diocesan Pastoral Assembly on March 11–12, 2005, during which the Diocesan Pastoral Thrust, Direction, and Vision-Mission Statement were designed along with the Diocesan Hymn and Parish Pastoral Council (PPC) Guidelines.

From having 50 pioneer parishes in 2003 (with Santa Krus Parish in Bagumbong being the first to be established under the new diocese – by decree of Bishop Teodoro Bacani), the diocese as of 2024 has now 71 full-fledged parishes and 1 mission area.

== Ordinaries ==
Bishop		Period in office	Notes	Coat of arms
1	Teodoro Cruz Bacani Jr.	January 16 – November 25, 2003 (313 days)	Resigned following allegations of sexual misconduct.	
2	Antonio Realubin Tobias	January 26, 2004 – June 6, 2019 (15 years, 131 days)	Retired from office	
3	Roberto Orendain Gaa	August 24, 2019 – present (7 years, 28 days)		

== Vicars-general ==
The following priests served as Vicar-general of the diocese. From 2012 to 2015, the moderator curiae, Fr. Albert Delvo, temporarily exercised the duties pertinent to a vicar-general pending the appointment of a new one.

- Rev. Fr. Gerardo Tapiador, SSL (2003-2004, 2007-2012)
- Rev. Fr. Miguelito Lagrimas (2004-2007)
- Rev. Msgr. Jesus-Romulo Rañada, Ph.D, STh.D (2015-present)
- Rev. Fr. Antonio Labiao, Jr. (2004-present) (Vicar-General for Pastoral Affairs)
