= Novaliches Cathedral =

Roman Catholic cathedral in Quezon City, Philippines

- Cathedral Shrine and Parish of the Good Shepherd
- Katedral-Dambana at Parokya ng Mabuting Pastol (Filipino); Catedral-Santuario y Parroquia del Buen Pastor (Spanish); Sanctuarium Cathedralis a Domini Nostri Jesu Christi, Pastor Bonus in loco v.d. Novaliches (Latin)
- Exterior of the church
- Novaliches Cathedral
- 14°41′51″N 121°04′02″E
- Location: Regalado Avenue corner Omega Street, Barangay Fairview, Quezon City
- Country: Philippines
- Denomination: Roman Catholic
- Website: www.novalichescathedral.com

History
- Former name(s): Archdiocesan Shrine and Parish of the Good Shepherd
- Founded: August 5, 1975
- Founder: Jaime Lachica Sin
- Dedication: Jesus, the Good Shepherd

Administration
- Division: Vicariate of the Good Shepherd
- Province: Manila
- Metropolis: Manila
- Archdiocese: Manila
- Diocese: Novaliches

Clergy
- Archbishop: Jose Advincula
- Bishop: Roberto Ordenain Gaa
- Rector: Albert Delvo
- Vicars: Alberto Mecaydor; Joshua Paul Sadernas

The Cathedral Shrine and Parish of the Good Shepherd, commonly known as Novaliches Cathedral, is a Roman Catholic church located along Regalado Avenue in Barangay Fairview, Quezon City in the Philippines. It is the seat of the Diocese of Novaliches. The church was established on August 5, 1975, by Manila Archbishop, Jaime Lachica Sin, who designated Fidelis Ruben Limcaco as the church's first parish priest.

From 1975 to 2003, the Good Shepherd Archdiocesan Shrine was a part of the Archdiocese of Manila. It was elevated to the status of cathedral when it was designated as the seat of the newly created Diocese of Novaliches in January 2003. Jesus-Romulo C. Rañada became the first cathedral rector. Since 2019, Antonio E. Labiao Jr. has been the pastor and rector.

== History ==
The Catholic Community of Fairview in Quezon City started when a new subdivision, Fairview Park, was developed by the Regalado family in the northern part of Quezon City in the early 1970s. During that time, there was no daily Mass in their community. It was still part of the Our Lady of Mount Carmel Parish in Project 6, Quezon City and Sunday Mass was celebrated by a Dutch Carmelite priest, Nico Hofstede, in a motor pool owned by the Regalado Family.

The community in Fairview Park was then growing and it was the dream of the residents that a new parish be founded within the subdivision. On August 18, 1975, Jaime Sin erected a new parish in Fairview Park. He appointed and installed on the same day Fidelis Ruben Limcaco as the first parish priest. Limcaco named the parish as "The Good Shepherd Parish". It had a wide area of jurisdiction; Tala & Bagong Silang (Caloocan) in the north; part of Novaliches in the west; Luzon Avenue in the south; and Marikina River in the east.

The Parish of the Good Shepherd was first housed in a small chapel at the crossroads of Fairview Avenue (now Commonwealth Avenue) and Regalado Avenue, loaned by the family of Bonifacio C. Regalado. As the community expanded, a need for a bigger church was imperative. The Regalado family donated a 3,650-square-meter (39,300 sq ft) property at the corner of Regalado Avenue and Omega Street. Architect Raoul Sotto began to draw plans for a "Christopolos": a church that would cater to the people’s needs.

On December 10, 1977, the Apostolic Nuncio to the Philippines, Archbishop Bruno Torpigliani led the celebrations during the monumental ground breaking ceremony and cornerstone laying. On May 29, 1981, Pope John Paul II, through the recommendation of the archbishop, named Limcaco as Papal chaplain.

The Limcaco Hall houses the parish halls and the diocesan offices of Novaliches.

For several years, many fund-raising affairs, social activities and solicitations took place to generate funds to continue the construction of the new church. These included "Gabi ng Harana", "Dinner Dance", "Raffles", "Bingo Social", and "Alay Envelop". The biggest source of funds was the "Miss Good Shepherd Parish" and "Santa Elena Contests". The new church was blessed, consecrated and dedicated to Jesus the Good Shepherd by Cardinal Jaime Sin, Archbishop of Manila on August 19, 1984.

A lot near the creek consisting of 1,635 square meters (17,600 sq ft) more or less was purchased from the Rural Bank of Tagaytay. The lot where the Parish Center and Retreat House was constructed, consisting of more than 2,000 square meters (22,000 sq ft), was later claimed from the government. Thereafter, the 5,000-square-meter (54,000 sq ft) lot at the back of the church was purchased from the United Coconut Planters Bank. The total land area of the church premises is more than 1.2 hectares (3.0 acres). From these properties, a Parish Center and Retreat House named after Limcaco was also constructed; this serves as a venue for the various seminars and activities of the parish. Other edifices were built through the efforts of the parishioners and benefactors outside the parish. Likewise, within the said area, four pavilions, a school house, an adoration chapel, a covered basketball court (now called the Parish Gym), ascension chapel, a swimming pool and other various buildings for the occupancy of church workers, were constructed. There is also an ecological garden surrounded by trees and ornamental plants.

On April 28, 1985, the parish was elevated into an archdiocesan shrine. Limcaco retired in 2002 and Jesus-Romulo Rañada, rector of San Carlos Seminary, was appointed by Cardinal Sin to become the second rector of the shrine. Rañada was installed in August 2002.

Pope John Paul II decreed the establishment of a new local church that would comprise the northern area of Quezon City and north Caloocan. This gave birth to the Diocese of Novaliches, which was inaugurated on January 16, 2003; Teodoro Bacani Jr. was appointed first bishop. Rañada became the first rector of the cathedral. The Good Shepherd Archdiocesan Shrine was renamed the Cathedral Shrine and Parish of the Good Shepherd, or shortly, the Cathedral of Novaliches.

The church is an architectural landmark in the area, with a striking facade consisting of tubular structures joined together to form a roof. The ascension chapel is to the left of the altar and is usually used for wakes and necrological services. A basement area is used for Parish Renewal Experience meetings and also holds choir records. The altar area was expanded and renovated in 2007 and features Art Deco ornamentation, a first in the Philippines. The crypt and sanctuary was also improved and expanded in the same year. Air-conditioning was installed in 2008. The Msgr. Fidelis Limcaco Hall is right beside the church and hosts concerts, receptions, and weekend markets. On the second floor of the Msgr. Fidelis Limcaco Hall are the Pastoral Offices of the Diocese of Novaliches. Limcaco commissioned the altar-tabernacle crafted by Eduardo Mutuc's pukpuk pilak.

== Pastors ==
The following have served as parish priests. Except for Limcaco, the parish priests serve also as cathedral rectors.

| Name | Years |
|---|---|
| Fidelis Ruben F. Limcaco | 1975–2002 |
| Jesus-Romulo "Romy" C. Rañada | 2002–2007 |
| Gerardo Giovanni "Gerry" R. Tapiador | 2007–2012 |
| Elpidio "Jun" R. De Peralta Jr. (Parish Administrator) | 2012–2013 |
| Mario S. Sanchez | 2013–2019 |
| Antonio "Tony" E. Labiao Jr. | 2019–2026 |
| Albert N. Delvo | 2026-present |

== Gallery ==
The Cathedral

Facade

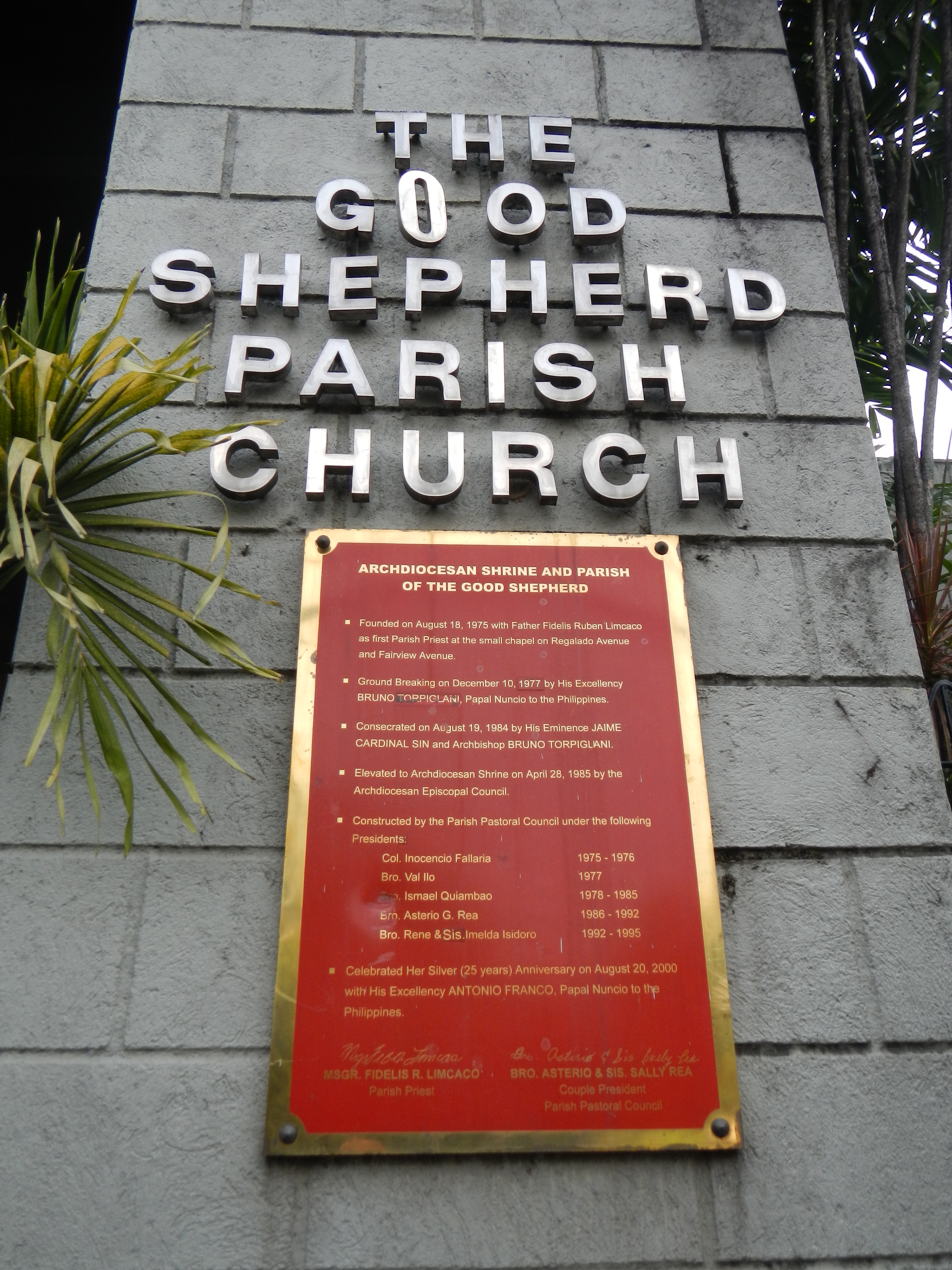
Canonical marker

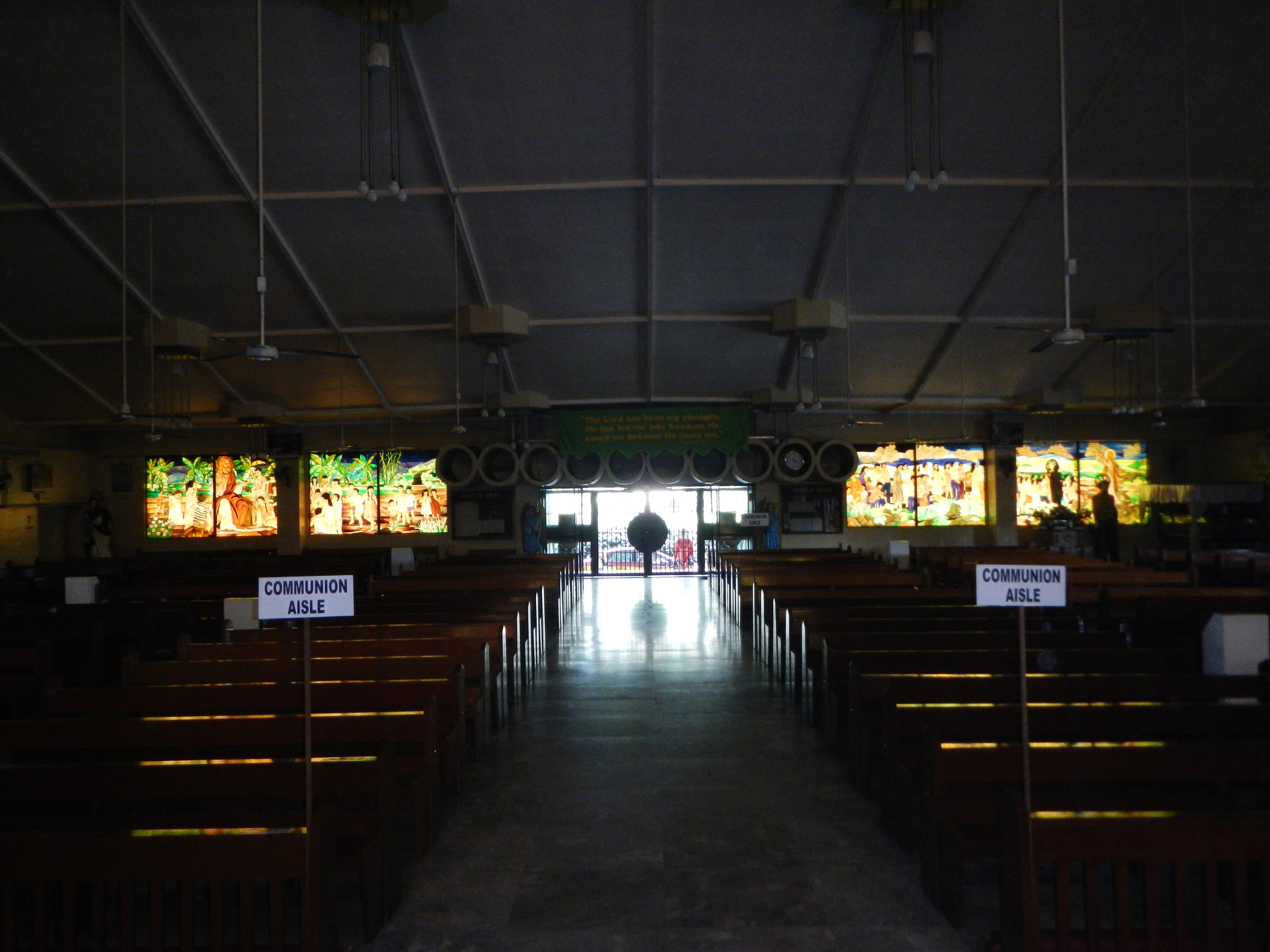
Church interior facing the main entrance

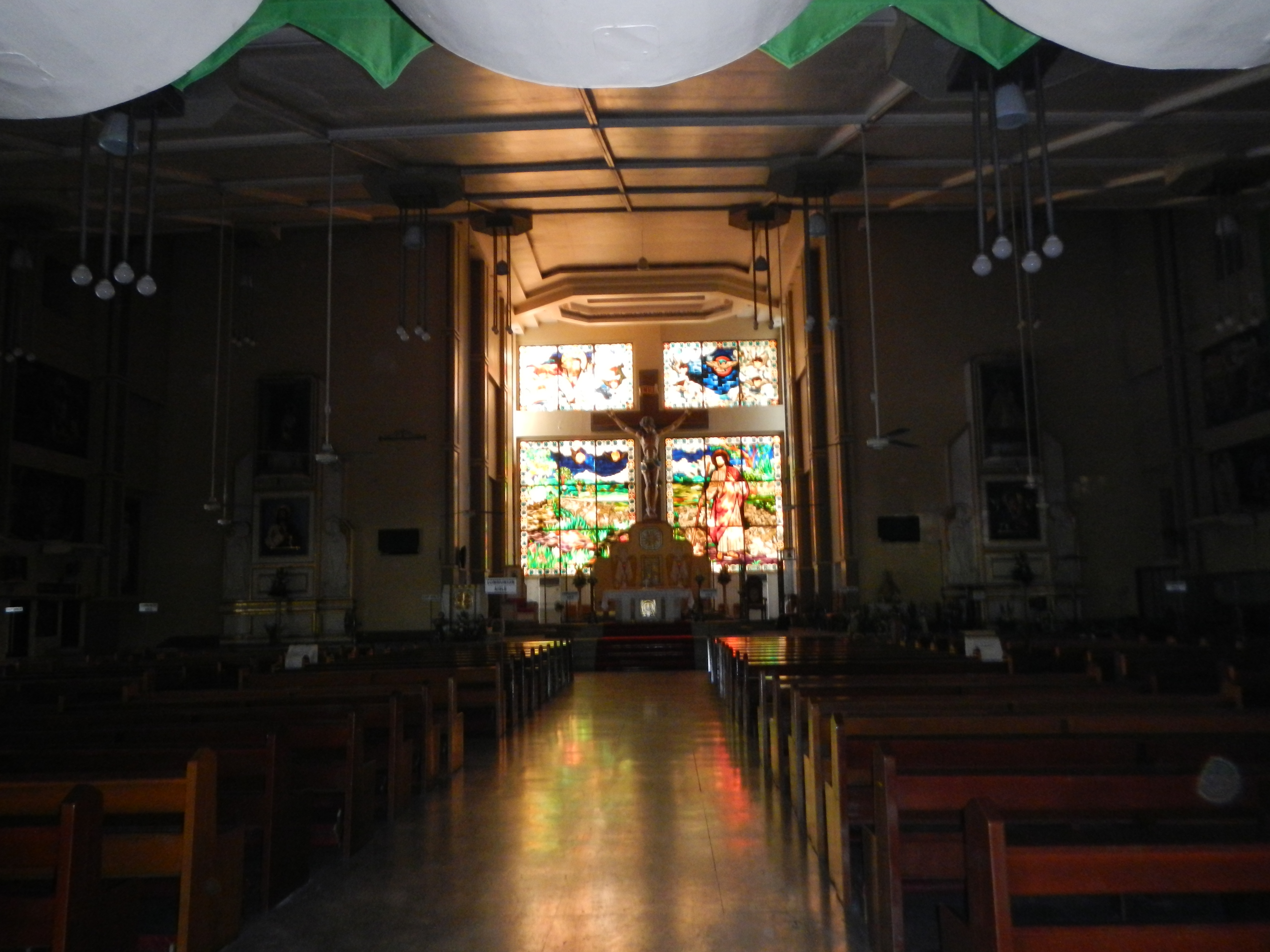
Church interior facing the altar

Main altar

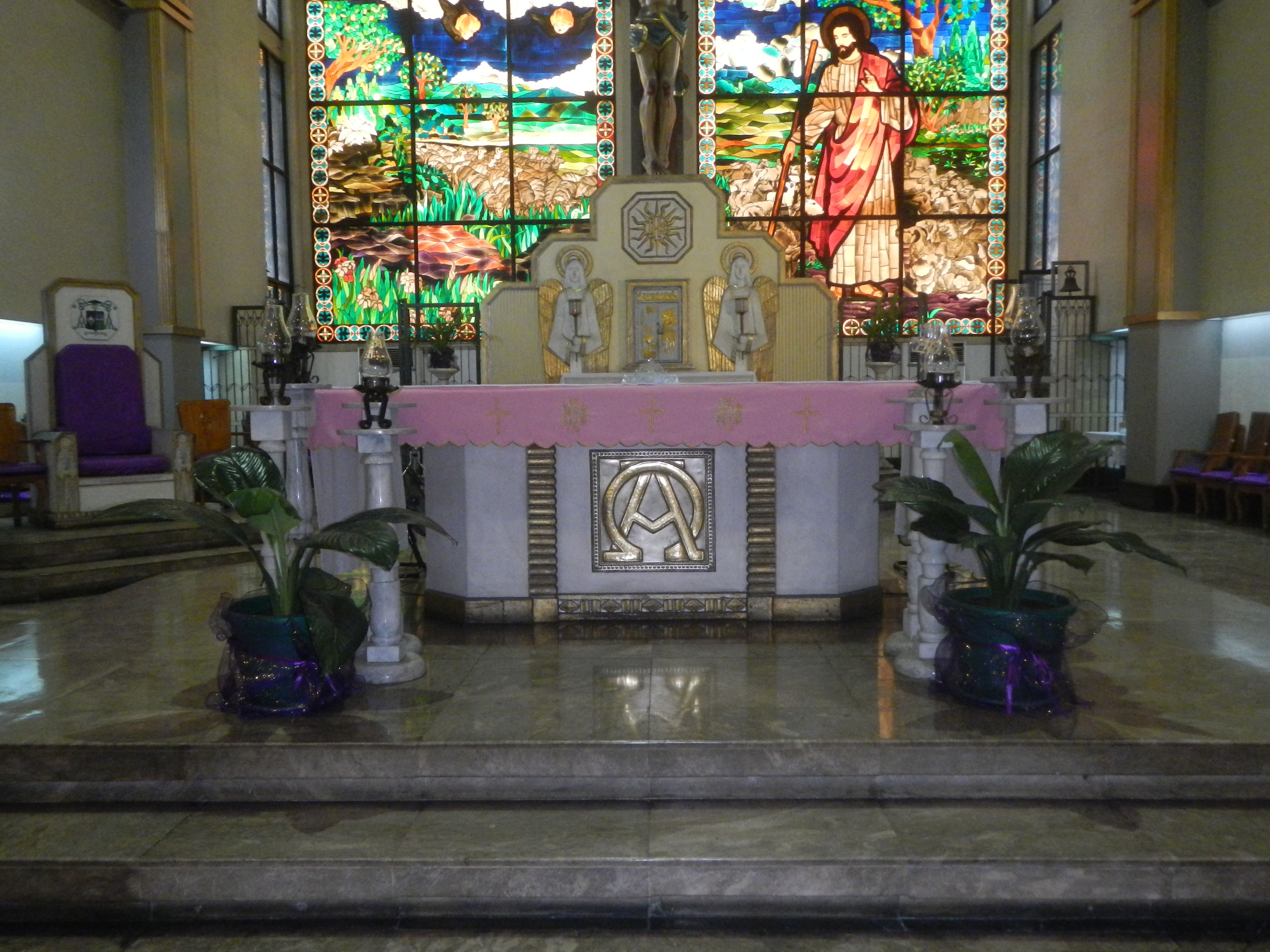
Altar-tabernacle (Eduardo Mutuc's pukpuk pilak, commissioned by Msgr. Fidelis Licaco)

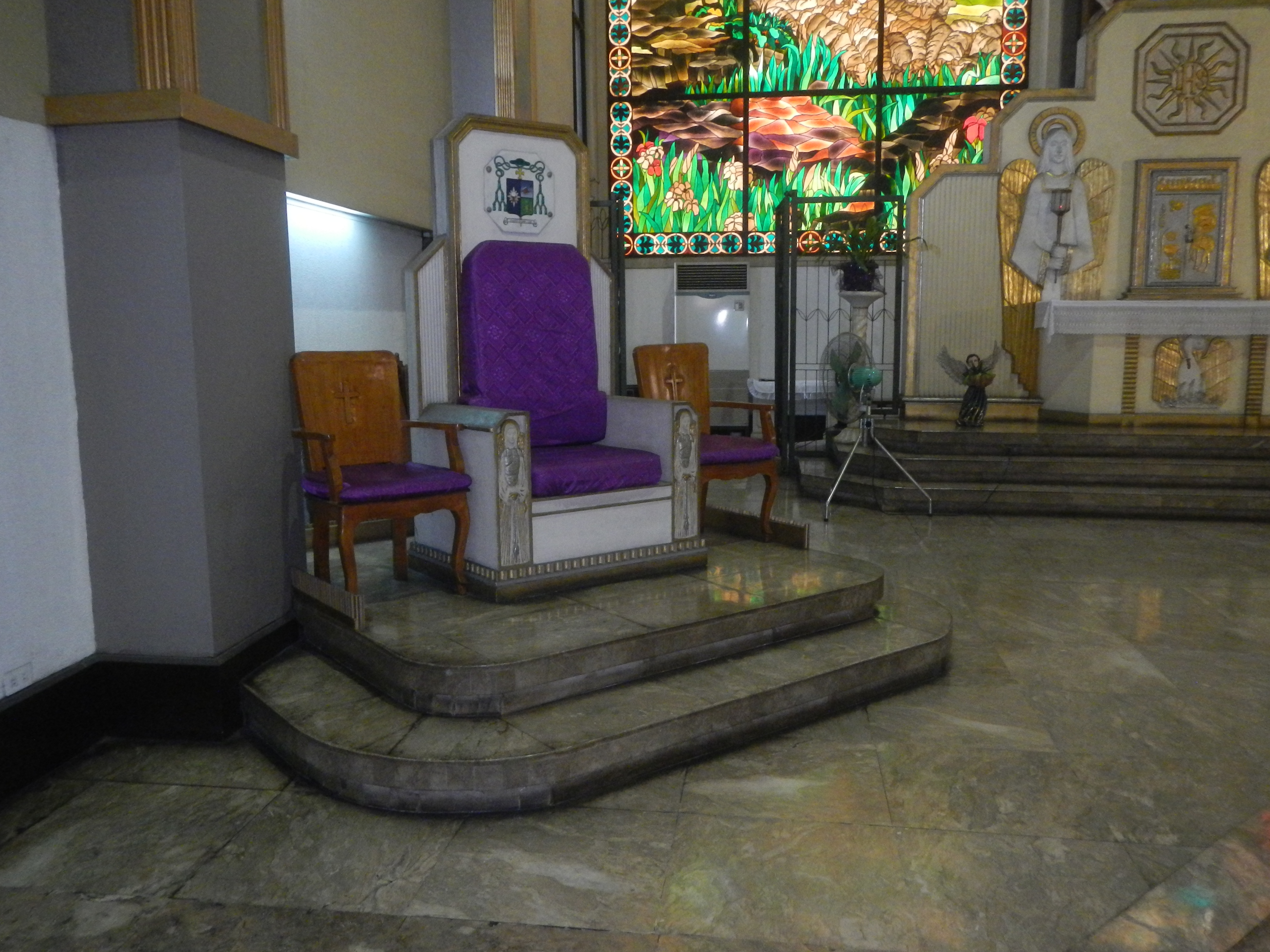
Cathedra

Msgr. Fidelis Limcaco Hall (Parish Hall and Chancery)

== Resources ==
- The 2008–2009 Catholic Directory of the Philippines (published by Claretian Publications for the Catholic Bishops' Conference of the Philippines, June 2008)
