= Palacio Arzobispal =

Coordinates: 14.590670348131415°N 120.97305089092903°E

- Archbishop's Palace
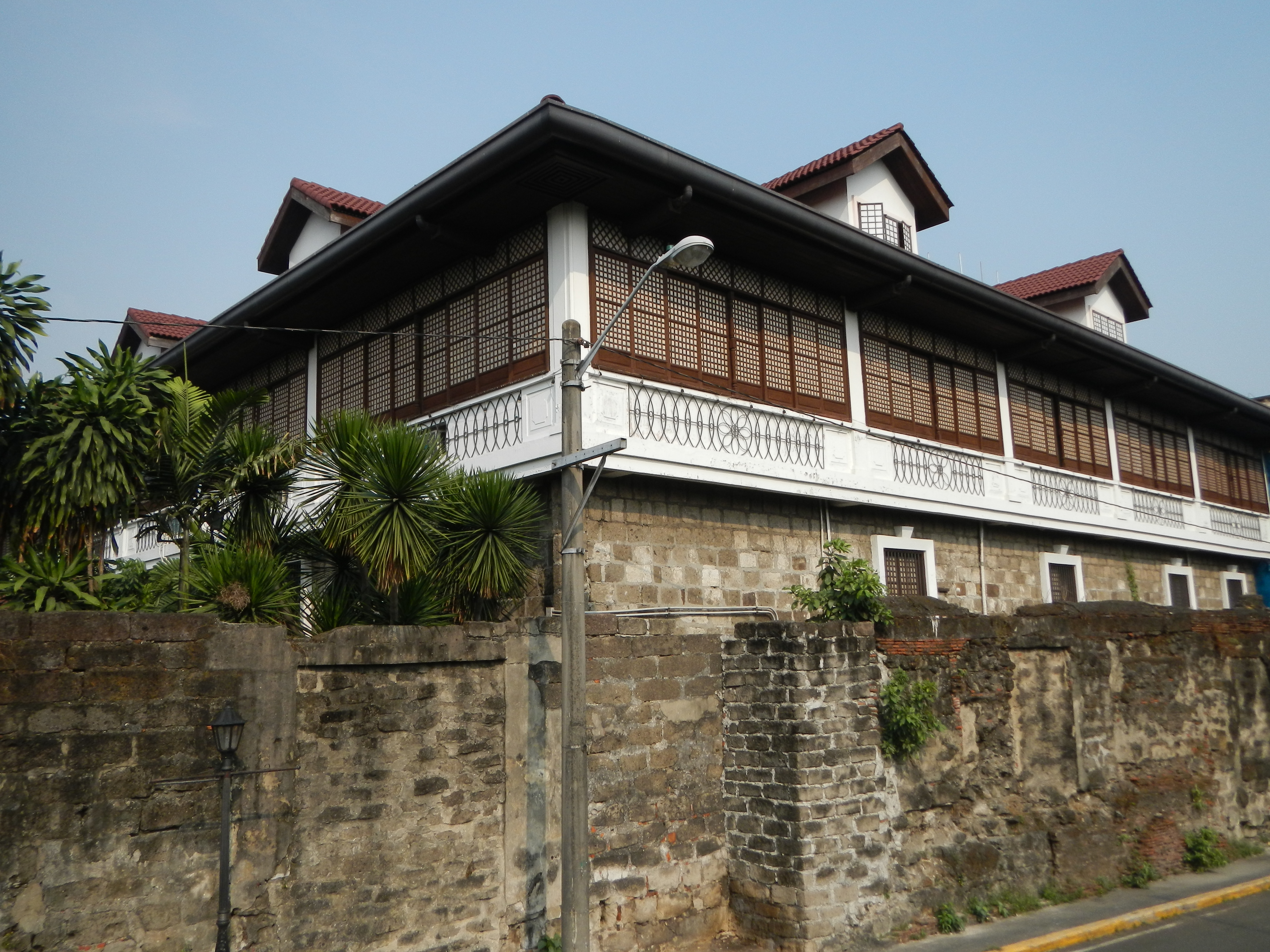
- A corner view of the Archbishop of Manila's Palace
- Interactive map of the Palacio Arzobispal area
- Alternative names: Arsobispado ng Maynila

General information
- Type: Mansion
- Architectural style: Bahay na Bato
- Location: 121 Arzobispo Street, Intramuros, Manila, Philippines
- Owner: Archdiocese of Manila

Technical details
- Material: Stones, Bricks, and Wood

The Palacio Arzobispal (Archbishop's Palace) is the official residence of the Archbishop of Manila, located in Intramuros, Manila. It was established in the 17th century as one of five episcopal palaces in the Philippines.

== The Arzobispado ==
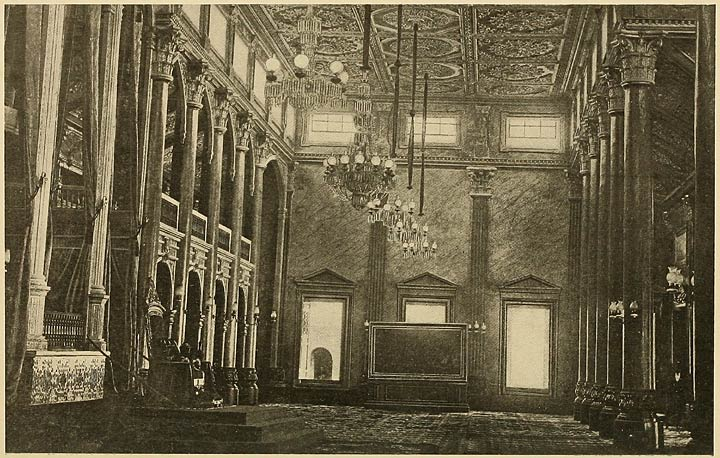
Interior of the Throne Room in the Archbishop's Palace as it was during the Spanish colonial period.

The Arzobispado was the residence and office of the Archbishop of Manila, located along Calle Arzobispo. The site was purchased during the episcopacy of Archbishop Millan de Poblete (1653–1667). It had a drapery-decked throne room, wherein formal receptions were held. The building was destroyed in 1944 during the Allied carpet bombing of Manila in the Second World War. Since then, no attempts were made to rebuild the palace. The site is presently occupied by a guesthouse, the archdiocesan chancery, and archives.

At present, there are nine offices under the Arzobispado managed by Moderator Curiae Rev. Msgr. Rolando R. dela Cruz. These are the Archdiocesan Archives of Manila, Archdiocesan Museum of Manila, Auditing Department, Chancery, Human Resource Development Department, Legal Office, Metropolitan Tribunal of Manila, Properties Administration Department and Treasury and Accounting Department.

== Present condition ==
The only other extant episcopal palace in use is that of Nueva Segovia (now in Vigan, Ilocos Sur despite Nueva Segovia being Lal-lo, Cagayan, and since 1910 part of the Archdiocese of Tuguegarao). Portions were converted into an ecclesiastical museum. The Episcopal Palace of Cebu was in an abandoned state, and efforts were made to convert it into an archdiocesan museum. The remaining episcopal palaces of Cáceres and Jaro were ruined by war.

=== Marker from the Intramuros Administration ===
Palacio Arzobispal
HERE ONCE STOOD THE ARCHBISHOP'S PALACE. ACQUIRED BY ARCHBISHOP MIGUEL DE POBLETE (1653–1667) FOR USE AS RESIDENCE. HOUSED THE OFFICES OF THE ARCHBISHOP OF MANILA AND THE CATHOLIC CHURCH IN THE PHILIPPINES. UNDERWENT MAJOR REPAIRS AFTER DAMAGE FROM EARTHQUAKES. DESTROYED IN 1944. PRESENT BUILDING CONSTRUCTED IN THE 1980'S [sic] FOR THE OFFICES OF THE ARZOBISPADO DE MANILA (ARCHDIOCESE OF MANILA).
