= Eduardo Mutuc =

Filipino metalsmith and sculptor (born 1949)

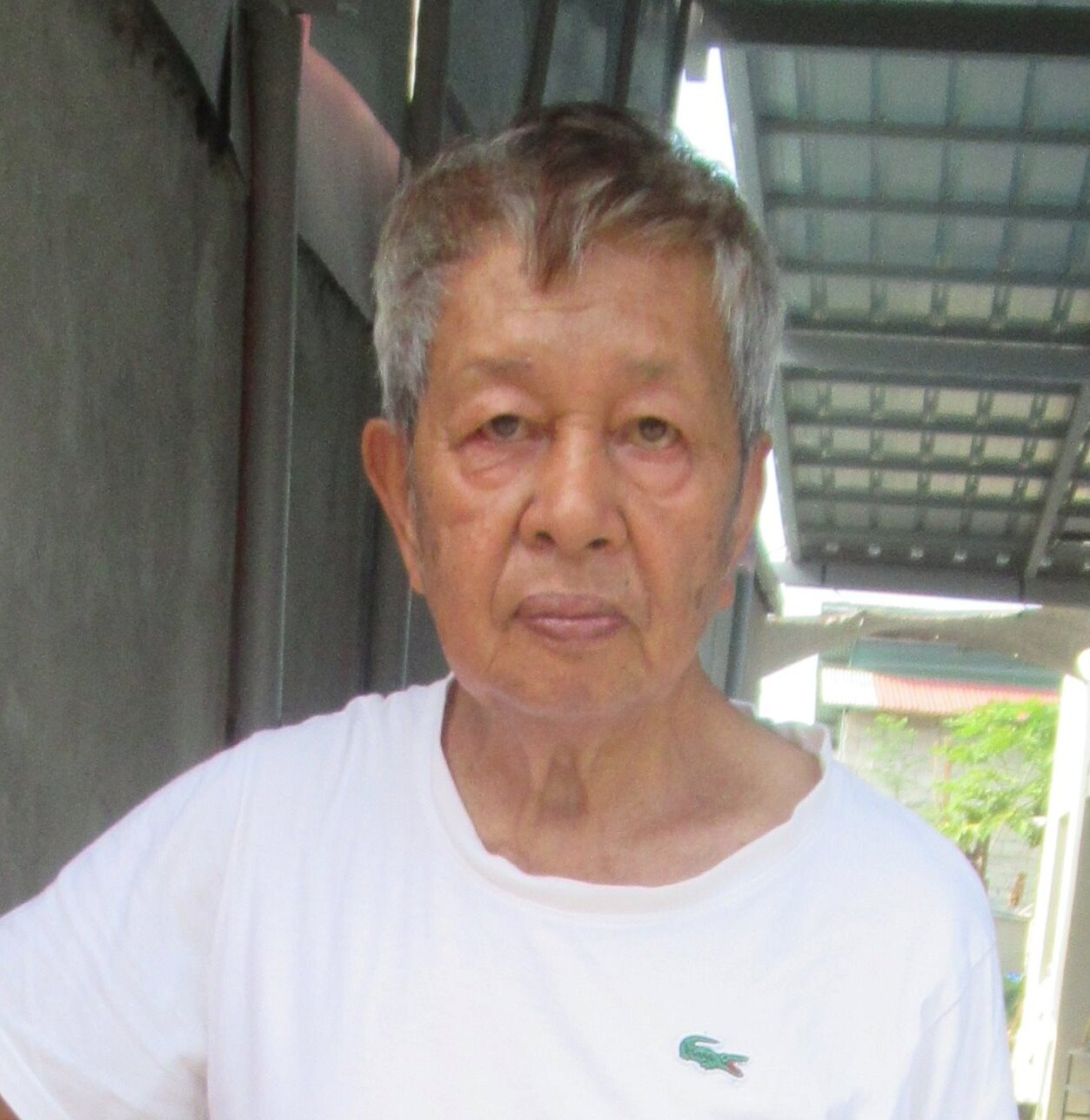
- Mutuc in 2025
- Born: October 12, 1949 (age 76)
- Style: Pinukpuk metalwork
- Awards: National Living Treasure Award; 2004

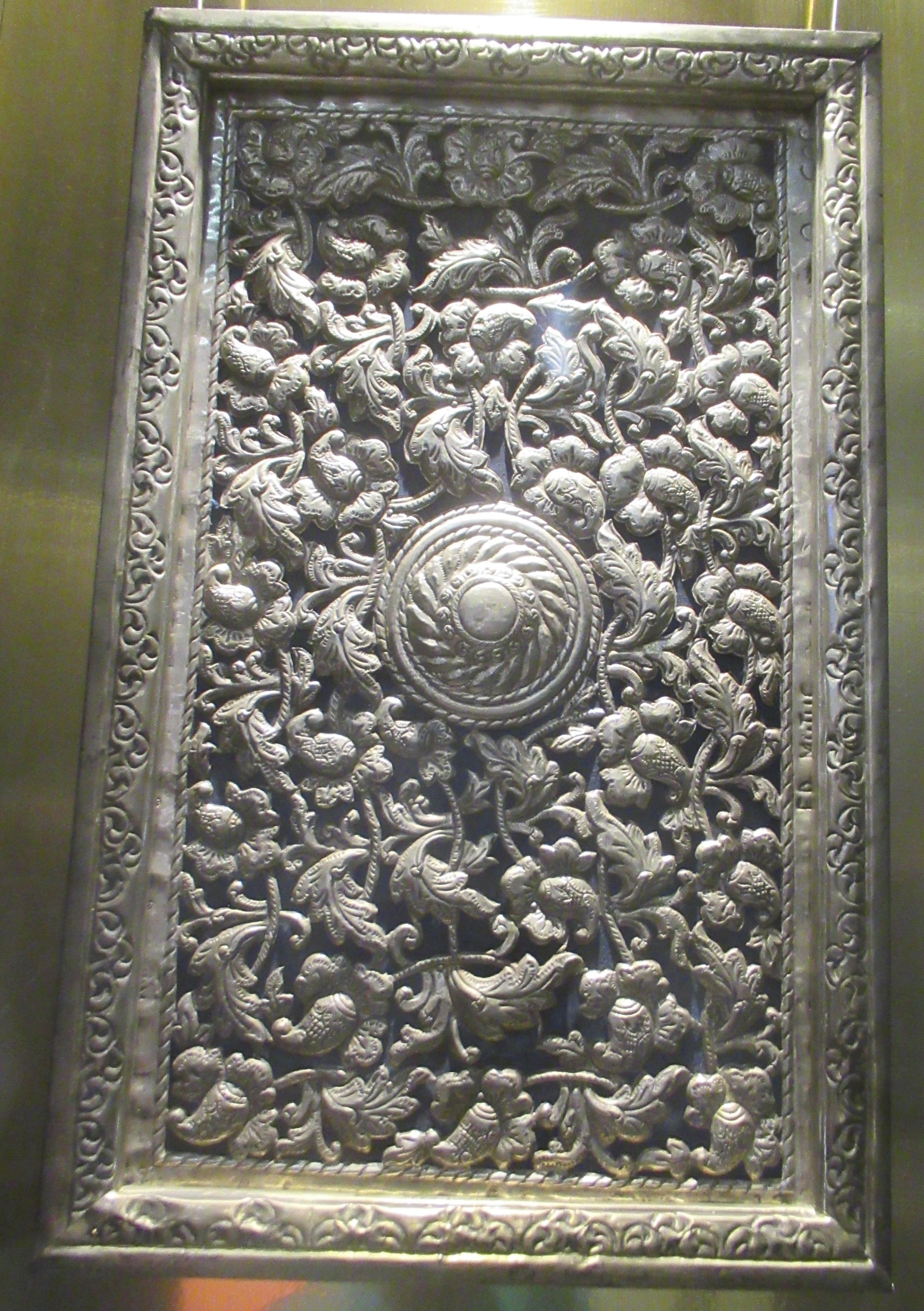
Mutuc's pukpuk pilak NCCA

Eduardo Tubig Mutuc is a Filipino metalsmith and sculptor. He is known to be a practitioner of the craft of pinukpuk which involved the stamping of embellishments on metal sheets.

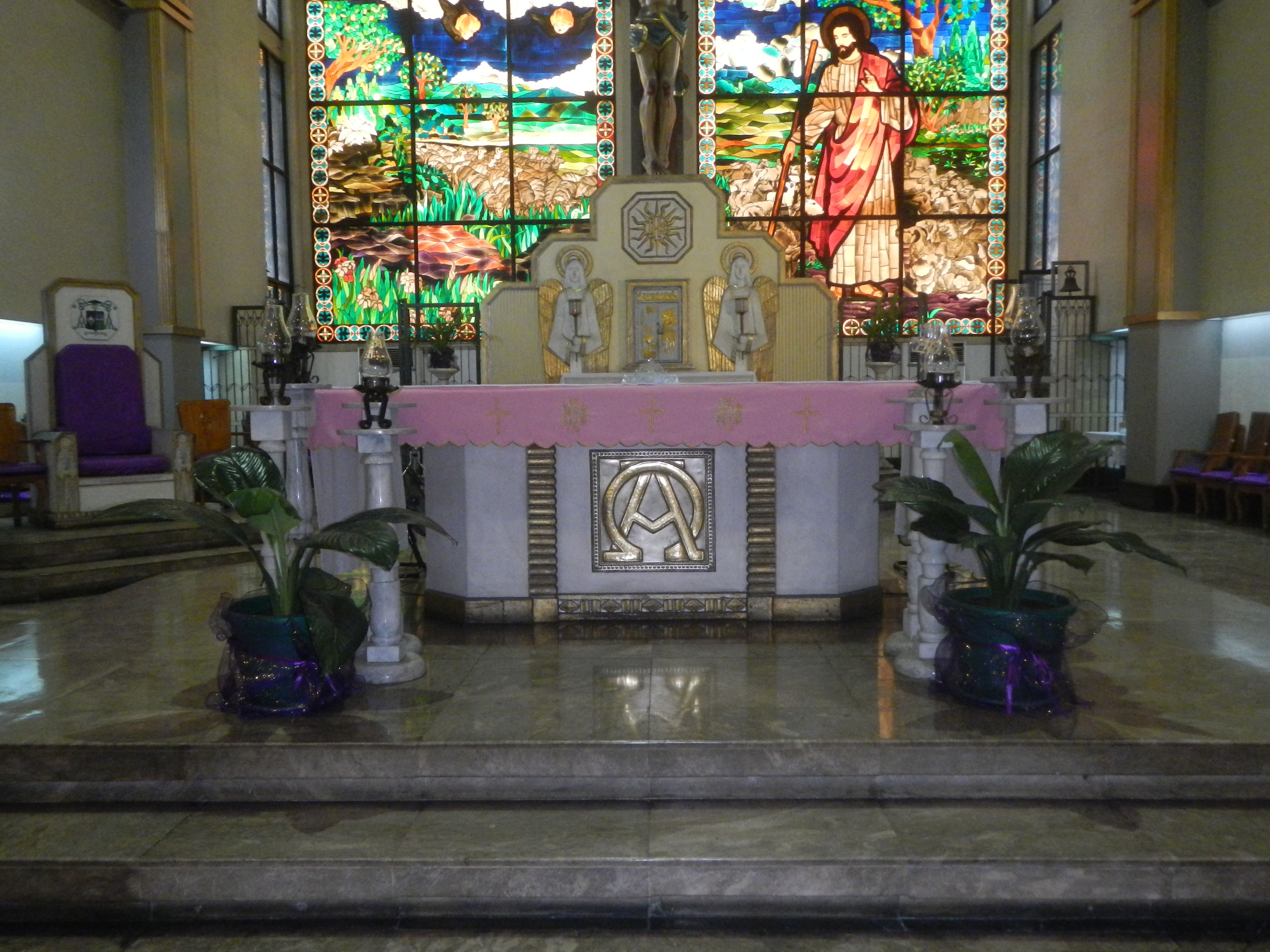
Novaliches Cathedral's pukpuk pilak tabernacle

Mutuc creates works of both secular and religious nature using silver, wood and bronze mediums. This includes retablos, mirrors, altars and carosas.

== Career ==
Mutuc is a Kapampangan from Apalit, Pampanga. He was born on October 12, 1949, to farmers and grew up with nine siblings. He only finished his elementary education helping his parents in farming thereafter. He continued to work as a farmer in adulthood.

Finding an alternative source of income to supplement his earnings from farming, he started his artistic career late as a woodcarver at age 29. He worked in an antique shop owned by the Lozano family who were his relatives as a helper. It was during his stint that he learned woodcarving under Carlos Quiros. On his sixth year, he learned silver plating or locally known pinukpuk from a colleague and left the furniture shop where he was working to be an independent craftsman with another friend.

One of his first clients as an independent craftsman was Novaliches Cathedral's first parish priest, Monsignor Fidelis Ruben Limcaco who commissioned him to create a tabernacle using pukpuk pilak craft. He went on to create other religious works many of which are based on Spanish colonial designs although Mutuc also incorporates his own ideas. He also did works of secular nature, although even in this case rely on religious influence to create such works.

He was given the National Living Treasures Award in 2004.

== Personal life ==
Mutuc got married when he was 20 years old. He fathered nine children with his wife.
