= San Isidro Catholic School =

Roman Catholic school in Pasay, Philippines

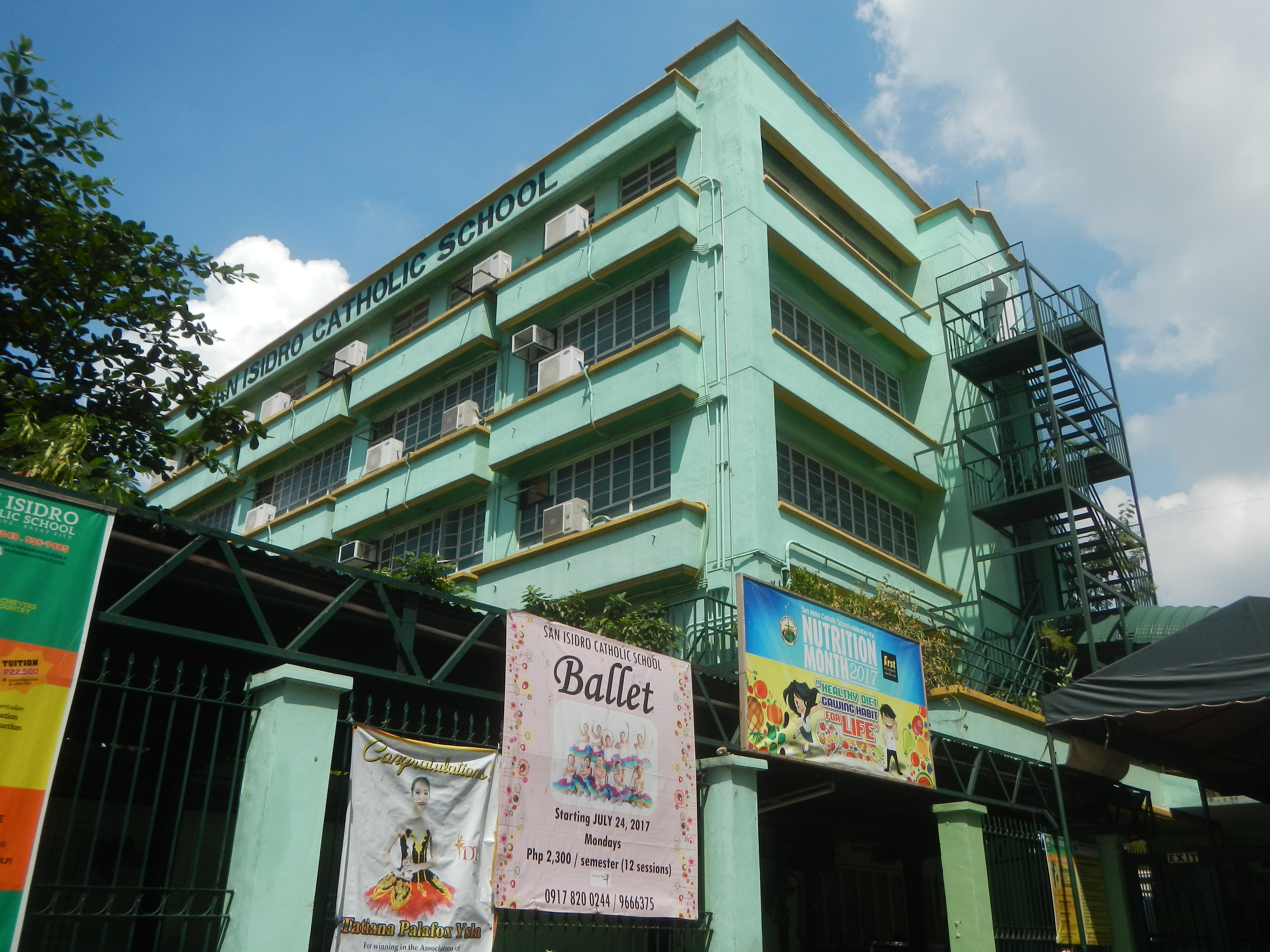

Location
- Pasay; Philippines
- Coordinates: 14°33′30″N 120°59′50″E

San Isidro Catholic School (also known as SICS or San Isidro) is a Roman Catholic private parochial school located in Pasay, Philippines that offers primary to senior high school education. It was established in 1967 by Msgr. Emmanuel Magtanong Cruz.
