= Teodoro Bacani Jr. =

Filipino Bishop Emeritus of Novaliches

The Most Reverend Teodoro Bacani Jr. OP
- Bishop Emeritus of Novaliches
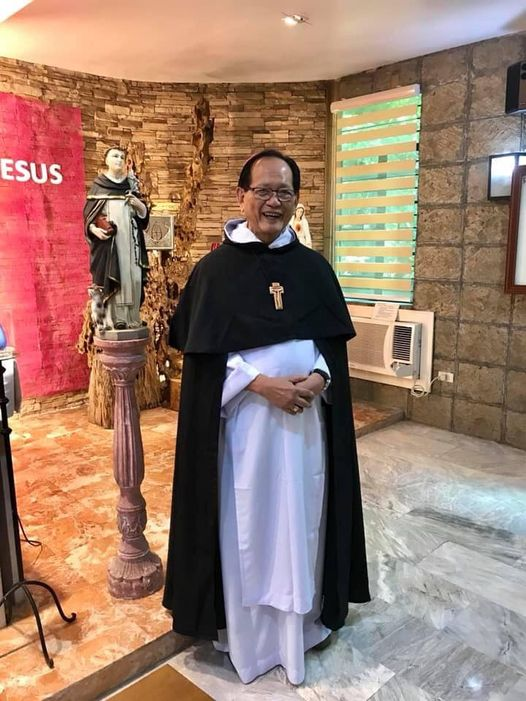
- Bishop Bacani, circa 2019.
- Church: Catholic Church
- Diocese: Novaliches
- Appointed: December 7, 2002
- Installed: January 16, 2003
- Term ended: November 25, 2003
- Predecessor: Position established
- Successor: Antonio Tobias
- Other post: Spiritual advisor of El Shaddai (2003–)
- Previous posts: Auxiliary Bishop of Manila (1984–2002); Titular Bishop of Gauriana (1984–2002)

Member of the Philippine Constitutional Commission
- In office June 2, 1986 – October 15, 1986
- President: Corazon Aquino

Orders
- Ordination: December 21, 1965 by Rufino Santos
- Consecration: April 12, 1984 by Bruno Torpigliani

Personal details
- Born: Teodoro Cruz Bacani Jr. January 16, 1940 (age 86) Balanga, Bataan, Philippine Commonwealth
- Coat of arms: Teodoro Bacani Jr.'s coat of arms

Ordination history
History
Priestly ordination
- Ordained by: Rufino Santos
Episcopal consecration
- Principal consecrator: Bruno Torpigliani
- Co-consecrators: Amado Paulino y Hernandez; Paciano Aniceto

Teodoro "Ted" Cruz Bacani Jr., OP (born January 16, 1940) is a Filipino Catholic prelate of the Dominican Order who served as Bishop of Novaliches from January to November 2003, when he resigned after a sexual harassment scandal. He previously served as Auxiliary Bishop of Manila from 1984 to 2002.

== Career ==
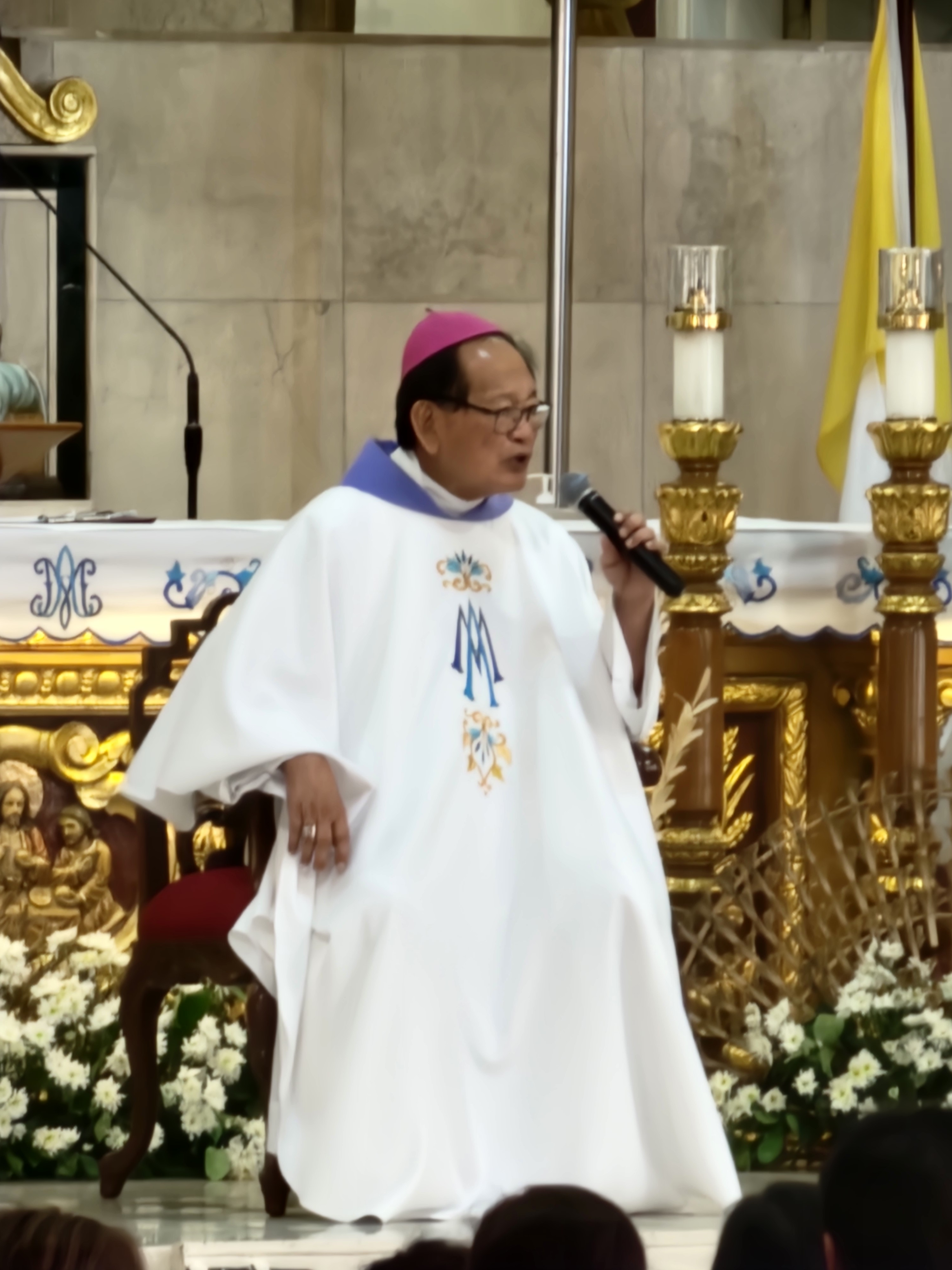
Bishop Bacani gives a homily at Quiapo Church.

Bacani was ordained priest on December 21, 1965, in the Diocese of Iba in Zambales. He was also a former dean and professor in theology at the San Carlos Seminary. He served as auxiliary bishop of the Archdiocese of Manila and titular bishop of Gauriana from 1984 to 2002. He is also the spiritual advisor of the El Shaddai charismatic group.

Following the creation of the Diocese of Novaliches on December 7, 2002, by Pope John Paul II, Bacani was appointed as its first bishop. He was appointed as bishop of the diocese on January 16, 2003, on his 63rd birthday. In April 2003, Bacani was accused of sexually harassing his 33-year old personal secretary. He denied the allegations but admitted to making "inappropriate expression of affection" to her. He was backed by the diocese and El Shaddai, with both expressing confidence in Bacani. He resigned from the position on November 25, 2003.

On August 15, 2019, Bacani joined the Order of Preachers.

== Political involvement ==
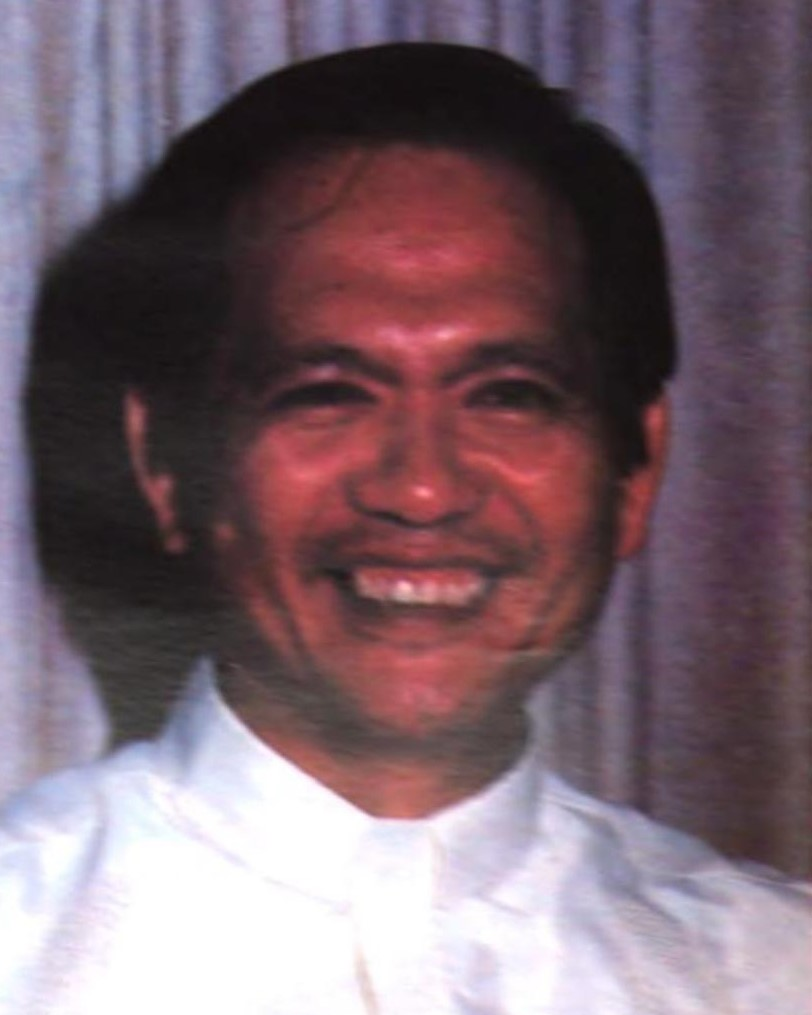
Bacani from the Official Directory of the Constitutional Commission, c. 1986

Bacani was among the critics of the administration of former president and dictator Ferdinand Marcos. He was among the framers of the 1987 Constitution of the Philippines. Amidst the impeachment of President Gloria Macapagal Arroyo, he supported the "search for the truth" behind allegations that Arroyo cheated in the 2004 elections.

Bacani was critical of the Disbursement Acceleration Program (DAP) of the administration of President Benigno Aquino III which he says is just used as a means for bribery. He alleged the DAP was used to bribe senators so that Renato Corona could be impeached.

Bacani also opposed the purchase of contraceptives by the Philippine government which he believes is detrimental.

Bacani joined other members of the clergy in condemning the war on drugs of President Rodrigo Duterte.

For the 2022 presidential elections, Bacani disavowed El Shaddai leader's Mike Velarde's endorsement of then-candidate Bongbong Marcos's campaign. While he maintain he respect's Velarde's position, he called the endorsement as "very wrong" pointing out the reputation of the Marcos family's corruption.

Catholic Church titles
Preceded by Teresio Ferraroni	Titular Bishop of Gauriana; March 6, 1984 – December 7, 2002	Succeeded by Joseph Louis Jean Boishu
New diocese	Bishop of Novaliches; January 16 – November 25, 2003	Succeeded by Antonio Tobias
