= Tipasa in Numidia =

Town in the Roman province of Numidia in North Africa

Tipasa, distinguished as Tipasa in Numidia, was a town in the Roman province of Numidia in North Africa. Its ruins are located 957 meters (3,140 ft) above sea level near present-day Tiffesh in Constantine Province, Algeria, 88 kilometers (55 mi) south of Annaba.

== History ==
Tipasa was a Carthaginian trading post under the name ṬPʿTN (Punic: 𐤈𐤐𐤏𐤕𐤍) (meaning "place of passage" or "stopover"). It was connected with the port Hippo Regius by a road; they struck their coins in common.

It was taken over by the Roman Republic at some point after the Punic Wars.

Roman Northwest Africa, including Tipasa in Numidia

== Ruins ==
The chief ruin is Tipasa's extensive fortress, which had walls 3 meters (10 ft) thick.
