= Black Nazarene =

Historic image of Jesus Christ in Quiapo Church, Manila, Philippines

Coordinates: 14°35′56″N 120°59′1″E

Nuestro Padre Jesús Nazareno Mahál na Poóng Jesús Nazareno
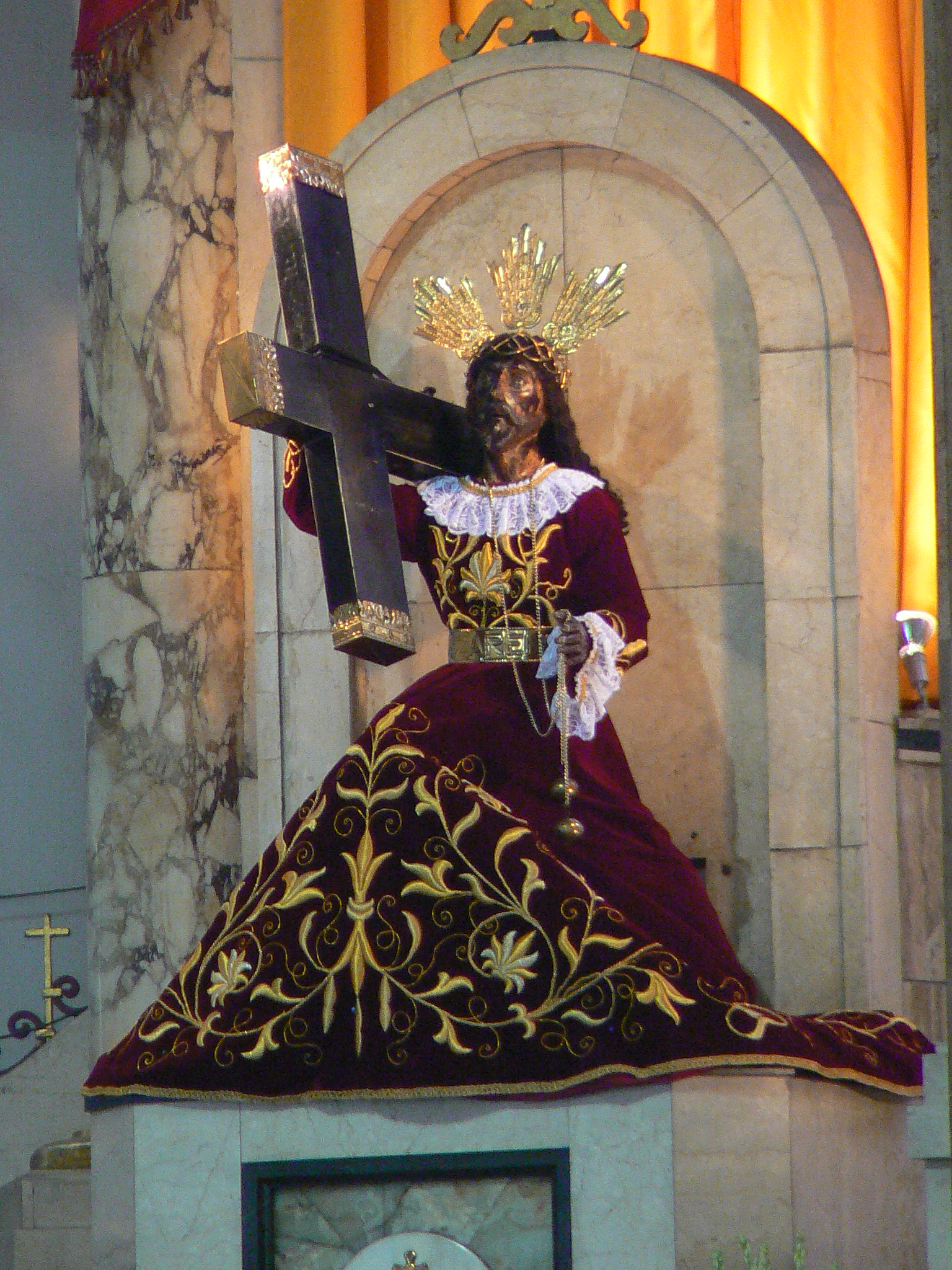
- The Señor Venerado enshrined in the high altar of Quiapo Church
- Location: Minor Basilica and National Shrine of Jesus Nazareno – Saint John the Baptist Parish (Quiapo Church), Quiapo, Manila, Philippines
- Date: c. 1606–1650; Acapulco, Guerrero, Mexico
- Witness: Augustinian Recollects; Basílio Tomás Sancho de Santa Justa y Rufina, Archbishop of Manila
- Type: Wood carving
- Approval: Pope Innocent X Pope Pius VII; Pope John Paul II
- Venerated in: Catholic Church
- Shrine: Minor Basilica and National Shrine of Jesus Nazareno
- Patronage: Quiapo, Tagalogs, Filipinos, Philippines
- Attributes: Dark skin, maroon and gold vestments, the Cross
- Feast day: January 9

The Black Nazarene (Spanish: El Nazareno Negro; Filipino: Poóng Itim na Nazareno), officially and liturgically known as Nuestro Padre Jesús Nazareno (lit. 'Our Father Jesus the Nazarene'; Filipino: Mahál na Poóng Jesús Nazareno) and often shortened to Jesús Nazareno, is a Roman Catholic title referring to a life-sized dark statue of Jesus Christ carrying the True Cross. The venerated image is enshrined in the Minor Basilica and National Shrine of Jesus Nazareno in Quiapo, Manila, Philippines.

Pious devotees believe that physically touching the image can grant miracles and cure diseases. The original image, or its replica, is brought out in procession three times a year:

- January 9 – the Feast of the Black Nazarene, the octave day of the traditional Feast of Most Holy Name of Jesus, which is the original dedication of Quiapo Church. It is now declared the image's national liturgical feast day. The Traslación is the name of the procession reenacting the 18th century transfer of the image from Intramuros.
- Good Friday – commemorating the culmination of the Passion of Jesus.
- December 31 – New Year's Eve, marking the start of the novena. It is also called the Walk of Thanksgiving or the Thanksgiving Procession.

== Name and description ==
The image derives its official name from "Nazarene", a title of Christ identifying him as a native of Nazareth, along with its dark complexion (unusual for depictions of Jesus, even in the Philippines, but can be found in Mexico where the statue was carved).

The Catholic Church encourages the image to be called Jesús Nazareno. Jose Cardinal Advincula, Archbishop of Manila, issued a decree on October 3, 2024 renaming the image and its shrine to Jesús Nazareno to "further focus the people on the holy name of our Lord than a color or attribute".

The image wears a braided wig made of dark, dyed abacá, along with a golden Crown of Thorns. Attached to the Crown are the traditional "Tres Potencias" ("three powers") halo, variously understood as symbolising the three Persons of the Holy Trinity; the faculties of will, memory, and understanding in Christ's soul; or his exousia (authority), dunamis (power), and kratos (strength). These three rayos ("rays"), likely an angular variant of the cruciform halo, are used exclusively for and proper to images of Jesus Christ in traditional Filipino and Hispanic iconography to signify his divinity. The original image has lost several fingers over the centuries.

Jesus is shown barefoot and in a genuflecting posture, symbolising the agony and the weight of the Cross, along with the overall pain Christ endured during his Passion. The Cross itself is of black wood tipped with flat, pyramidal brass caps.

=== Composition and main replicas ===
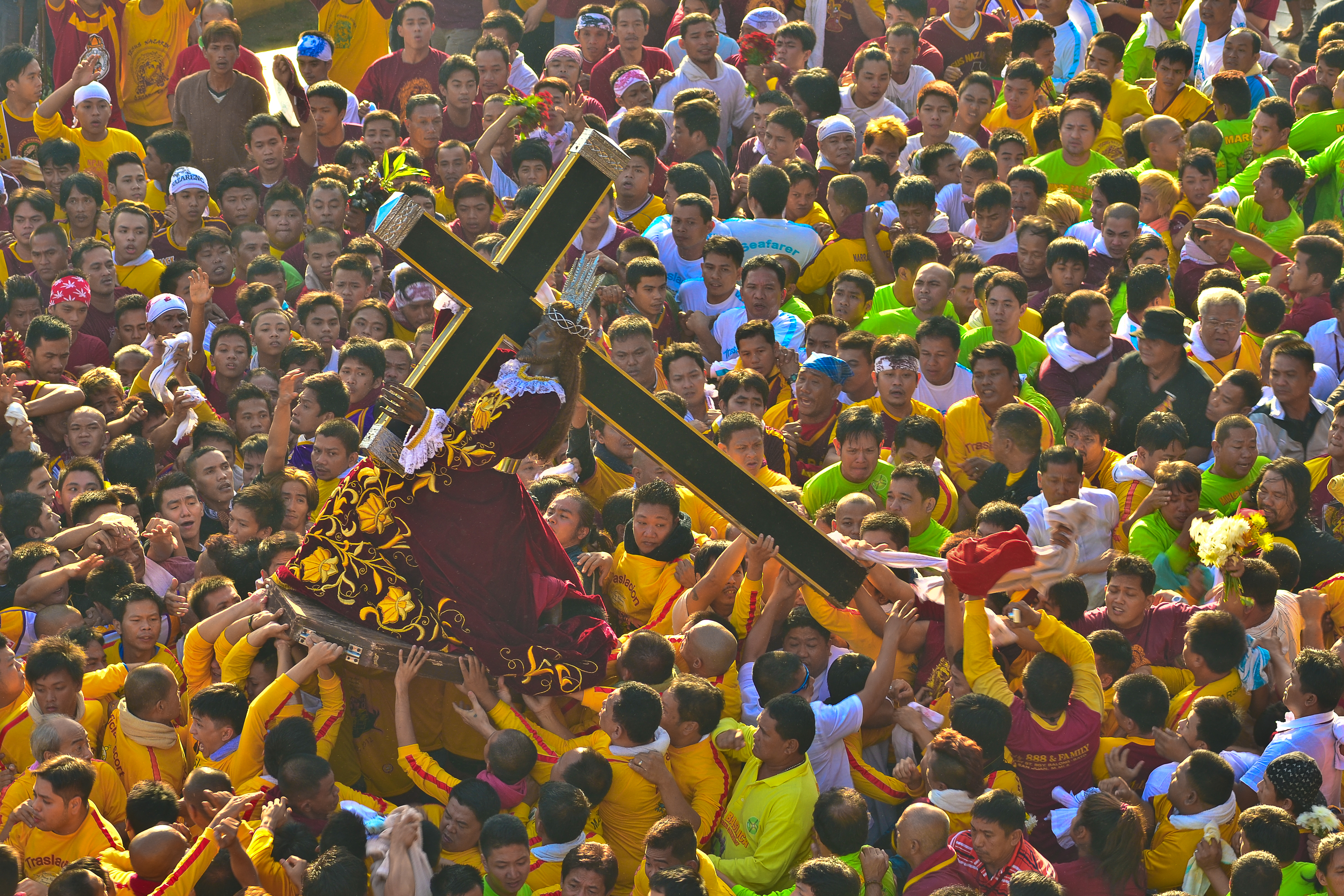
The Señor Vicário being lifted onto its ándas at the start of the 2012 Traslación. The peana or base of the image can be seen under the hem of its robes.

There is no singular complete image of the Jesús Nazareno, as the original one was broken into several pieces, and combined in two main replicas:

- The head of the original venerated image and its original right foot are on the statue called Venerado enshrined in the high altar, which has a body made of molave wood (Vitex parviflora or Vitex cofassus). The original cross is attached in this image, however a significant part of it was cut off and was distributed to devotees during the “400 years” celebrations in 2006.
- The Vicário is the processional image, used for the annual Traslación as well as the New Year's Eve and Good Friday processions, which retains the original body torso with a replica head of Litsea leytensis wood (Filipino: batikulíng).
- The original left and right hands of the image, as well as the original left foot, are guarded within the Rector's office. The original hands are used for blessing people, especially the sick and dying, and are not exposed for regular public veneration.

=== Callejeros ===
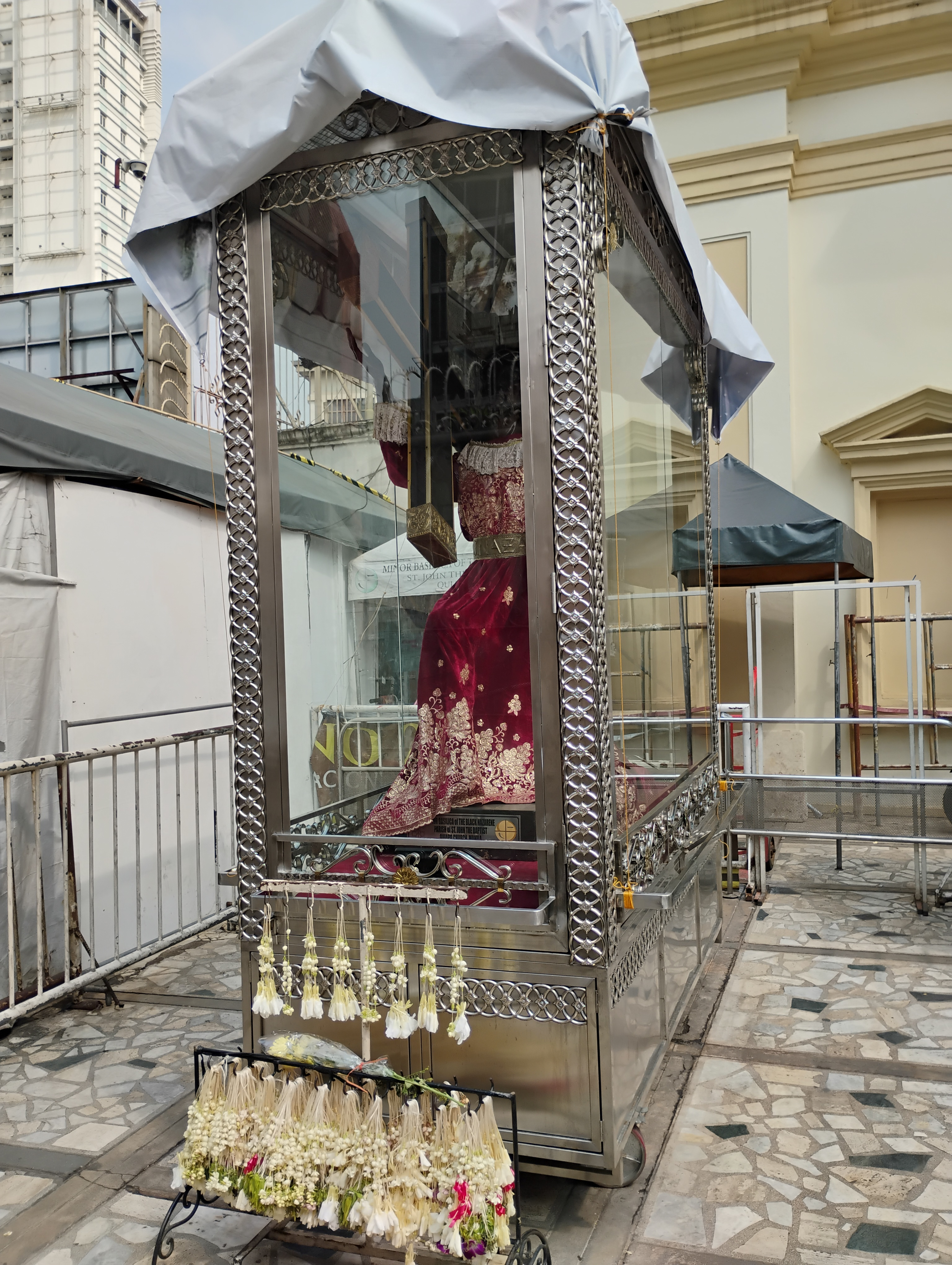
Callejero Señor Cabeza that is enshrined in front of Quiapo Church

Aside from the Venerado and the Vicário, the basilica also maintains other copies of the image called Callejeros. These are considered by the shrine as official replicas of the image sent on official visits to various dioceses in the country, called Dalaw Nazareno. On these visits, each callejero is accompanied by the standard of the basilica and shrine priests who would celebrate Mass in the host church.

The shrine presently has five Callejero images: Uno, Dos, Katorse, Disisiete, and Señor Cabeza. The names of the first four images refer to the number of replicas produced for the shrine when it was labeled. The Señor Cabeza replica was previously kept by the priest Emmanuel del Rosario of the Diocese of Cubao, as he was a devotee of the Jesús Nazareno. After his death, the image was donated to the church as a callejero on 26 October 2022.

=== Vestments ===
The image is dressed in a heavy velvet tunic of maroon, embroidered with floral and plant designs using gold thread, and trimmed with a matching set of white lace collar and cuffs. Around the waist is a gold-plated metal belt embossed with the word "NAZARENO", while a golden chain ending in spheres (borlas) is looped around the neck and held in the left hand, representing the Flagellation of Christ.

The vestments of the image are changed in the rite called Pabihis (vesting), which is presided over by a priest in an alb, red cope and stole. Devotees watching the ritual either sit inside the basilica, or follow along outside in Plaza Miranda. It comprises several hymns, scriptural lessons, prayers, and then the blessing of the new vestments. As a sign of modesty and reverence, a curtain is raised to shield the statue from public view as male attendants called Hijos change its vestments, and then it is dropped once the actual changing is finished. The old vestments are then folded and presented to the faithful, who queue to kiss and touch the garments believed to bear the image's miraculous properties. The vesting rite is performed five times a year in preparation for major religious occasions; since 2022, the vesting rites are also livestreamed online.

=== List of authorized replicas ===
The Quiapo Church also donates official replicas of the Nazareno to churches and shrines in the Philippines and abroad to spread devotion to the image. Currently there are 39 approved replicas, eight of which are enshrined overseas.

No.	Diocese	Parish	Location
1	Archdiocese of Cagayan de Oro	Jesus Nazareno Parish	Cagayan De Oro
2	Diocese of Iligan	Holy Cross Parish	Kolambugan, Lanao del Norte
3	Diocese of Ipil	Saint Joseph the Worker Cathedral Parish	Ipil, Zamboanga Sibugay
4	Diocese of Borongan	Assumption of Our Lady Parish	Borongan, Eastern Samar
5	Diocese of Malolos	Saint James the Apostle Parish	Plaridel, Bulacan
6	Archdiocese of Capiz	Hesus Nazareno Mission Station	Roxas City
7	Diocese of Talibon	Santo Niño Parish	Anda, Bohol
8	Diocese of Catarman	Diocesan Shrine of Nuestro Padre Jesus Nazareno (Saint Roch the Healer Parish)	Catarman, Northern Samar
9	Diocese of Bayombong	Saint Louis Beltran Parish	Solano, Nueva Vizcaya
10	Apostolic Vicariate of Taytay	Saint Mary Mission Station	Agutaya, Palawan
11	Archdiocese of Davao	San Alfonso Liguori Parish	Davao City
12	Diocese of Tandag		
13	Diocese of Tagum	Sagrado Corazon de Jesus Nazareno Parish	Tagum
14	Territorial Prelature of Batanes	Basco Cathedral	Basco, Batanes
15	Diocese of Tarlac	Parish of the Black Nazarene	Tarlac City
16	Military Ordinariate of the Philippines	Bureau of Fire Protection Chapel	Bureau of Fire Protection National Headquarters, Quezon City
17	Diocese of Tarlac	Mater Dolorosa Parish	Capas, Tarlac
18	Archdiocese of Lingayen-Dagupan	Jesus the Nazarene Parish	Binmaley, Pangasinan
19	Diocese of Laoag	Saint William the Hermit Cathedral	Laoag
20	Archdiocese of Nueva Segovia	Our Lady of Lourdes Parish	Banayoyo, Ilocos Sur
21	Archdiocese of Las Vegas	St. Charbel Maronite Catholic Church	Las Vegas, United States
22	Archdiocese of Singapore	Church of Our Lady Star of the Sea	Yishun, Singapore
23	Archdiocese of Palo	Saint Roch the Healer Parish	Tacloban
24	Diocese of Tagbilaran	Assumption of Our Lady Shrine-Parish	Dauis, Bohol
25	Latin Patriarchate of Jerusalem	Our Lady Woman of Valor Church	Tel-Aviv, Israel
26	Latin Patriarchate of Jerusalem	Saint Martha Monastery Passionist Church	Jerusalem
27	Diocese of Hong Kong	Saint Joseph Church	Hong Kong
28	Diocese of Balanga	Saint John the Evangelist Parish	Orani, Bataan
29	Diocese of Malaybalay	San Jose Chapel, San Isidro Cathedral	Malaybalay, Bukidnon
30	Diocese of Imus	San Rafael Archangel Quasi-Parish	Tagaytay
31	Diocese of Tarlac	San Sebastian Cathedral Parish	Tarlac City
32	Diocese of Bacolod	Mary, Queen of Peace Parish-Redemptorist	Bacolod
33	Diocese of Cabanatuan	Saint Joseph, the Husband of Mary Parish	Cabanatuan
34	Archdiocese of Cebu	Archdiocesan Shrine of Jesus Nazareno	Talisay, Cebu
35	Diocese of Orange	Poong Jesus Nazareno Filipino Catholic Center	Anaheim, California
36	Diocese of Legazpi	Diocesan Shrine of Our Lady of Salvation	Joroan, Tiwi, Albay
37	Diocese of Balanga	Virgen Milagrosa del Rosario College Seminary	Balanga, Bataan
38	Archdiocese of Los Angeles	Holy Family Catholic Church	Artesia, California
39	Archdiocese of San Francisco	St. Andrew Catholic Church	Daly City, California

=== Main carriage ===
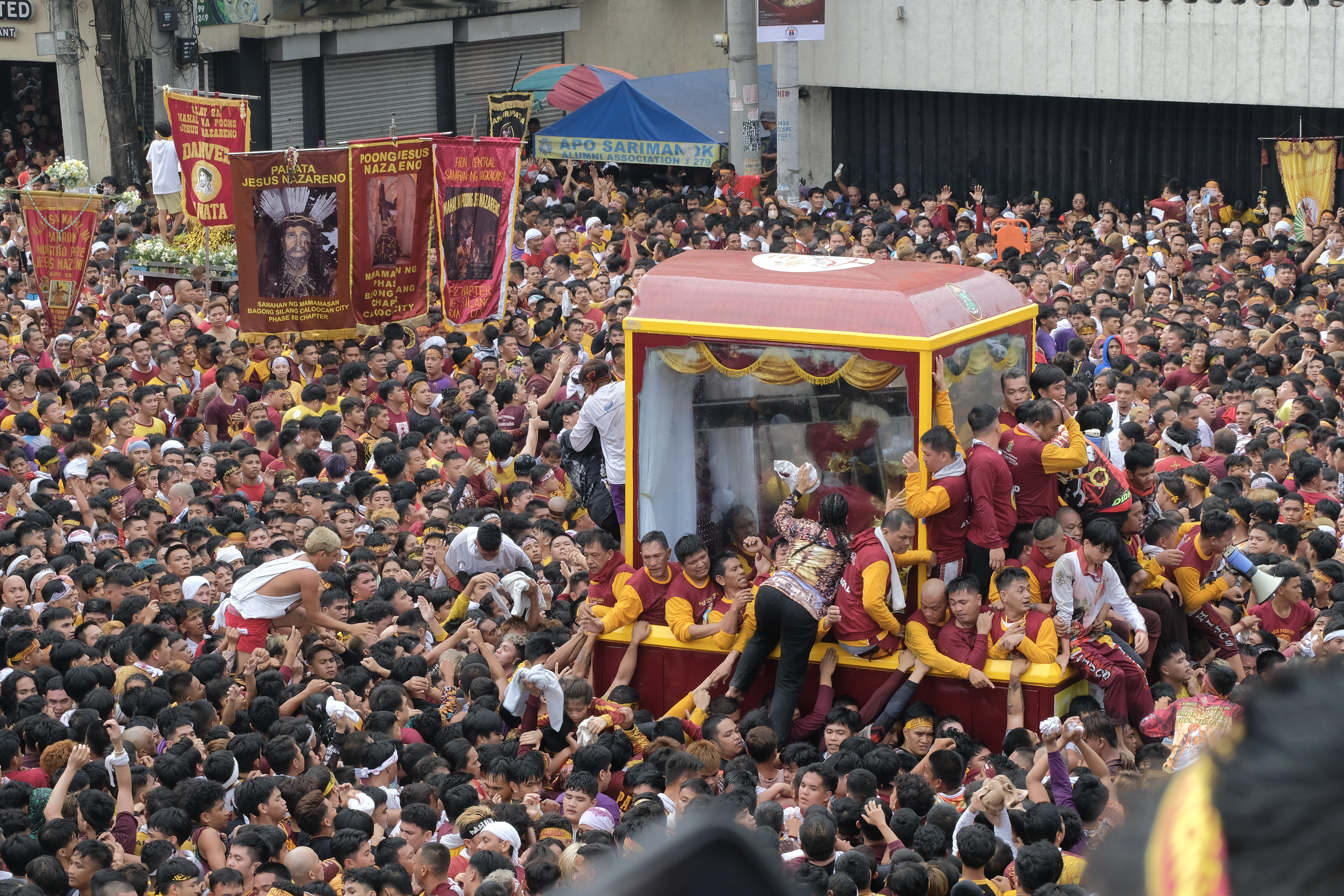
The ándas of the image during the 2024 Traslación

The image's wooden base is referred to as the peana while its carriage or carroza used in processions is called the ándas (from the Spanish andar, "to move forward"). The term ándas commonly refers to the shoulder-borne palanquins of religious images, and was retained for the icon's carriage which replaced the silver palanquins used until the late 20th century.

== History ==
=== Original image ===
The image was made by an anonymous Mexican sculptor and arrived in Manila via galleon from Acapulco, Mexico. There is no definite date of the arrival of the image. The Augustinian Recollects which was credited of bringing the image in the Philippines, asserted that at their arrival in the Philippines in 1606, the Nazareno was not among the sacred images that they brought with them. Nevertheless, it can be assumed the image was already in the Philippines before the mid-17th century, since Pope Innocent X authorized the Cofradía del Nuestro Padre Jesús Nazareno (Confraternity of Our Lord Jesus the Nazarene) on April 20, 1650.

Folk belief attributes the image’s colour to soot from votive candles burnt before it, although the most popular legend is that it was charred by a fire on the galleon that brought it from Mexico. Filipino Catholic theologian and church historian Monsignor Sabino Vengco, meanwhile, claims that the image is not charred, but is in fact dark through to its core, being carved from mesquite wood. Vengco based this claim on personal research in Mexico, where he said mesquite wood was a popular sculpting medium in the period the image was carved. He also likened it to Our Lady of Antipolo, another popular image of similar provenance and appearance. The dark coloration of the image hints to Catholic and indigenous Mexican syncretism, as the Christ of Chalma (Señor de Chalma), is also made of similar material and color.

The image was first enshrined in the Church of San Juan Bautista of the Augustinian Recollects in Bagumbayan, Luneta, then it was transferred to the Church of San Nicolás de Tolentino (popularly known as the "Recoletos Church") inside Intramuros. It was enshrined in the retablo mayor or high altar of the church, leaving only for a procession on Palm Sunday. Both the church and the image were destroyed in the Allied bombardment of Manila during its liberation in 1945.

=== Replica and alleged vandalism ===
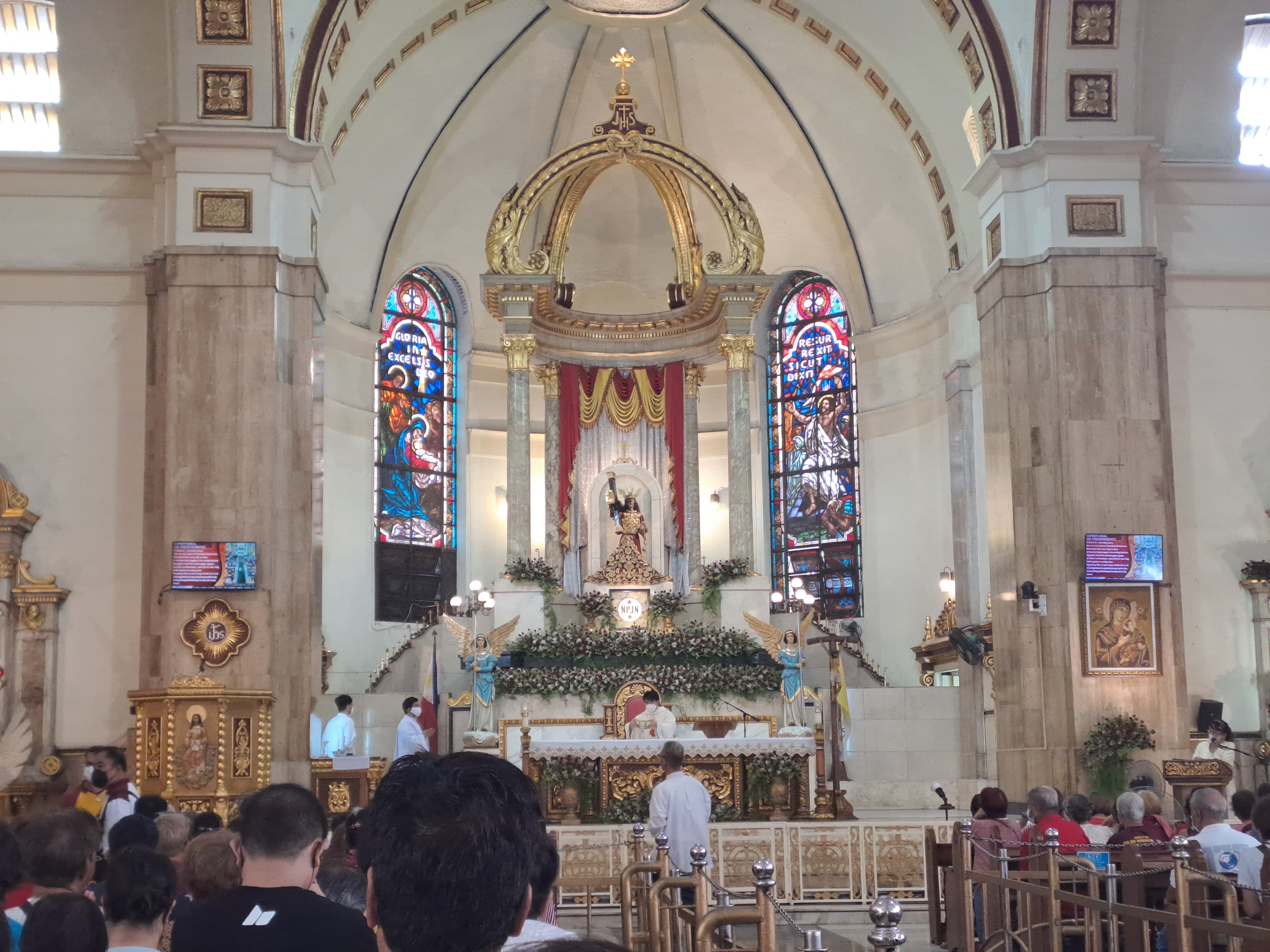
The image enshrined above the high altar of the Minor Basilica and National Shrine of Jesus Nazareno, Manila.

During his tenure as Archbishop of Manila (1767-1787), Basílio Sáncho de Santa Justa y Rufina ordered the Augustinian Recollect priests to transfer a copy of the image to the Quiapo Church. The reason was to give devotees greater access to the image, and secure the safety of Intramuros from outsiders. Contrary to popular belief that this transfer occurred on 9 January 1787, which became the basis of Feast of the Jesus Nazareno celebrated by the faithful every January 9 through a procession (the Traslación), there is no available historical record specifying the date of its transfer from Intramuros to Quiapo.

The venerable image survived numerous fires, earthquakes, and other natural and human-caused calamities, especially the Philippine Revolution, the 1929 fire that destroyed the church, and the widespread bombings in the Battle of Manila during World War II.

In the 1980s, the rector of the Basilica, Rev. Msgr. José C. Abriol, feared that the image might be damaged during the Traslación, fire, or natural disaster. He commissioned Gener Maglaqui, a santero (a sculptor of religious images) from Quiapo, to carve a replica of the head and body. The original head now sits atop the 1980s body (the Venerado), which remains enshrined in the church's main altar. The 1980s head was placed atop the original body (the Vicário). This composite image is the one used during major processions.

There is an urban legend of a fanatical Iglesia ni Cristo (Note: The Iglesia ni Cristo (Church of Christ), a sect with Restorationist-like beliefs, explicitly forbid the use of any religious image, including the crucifix.) member who allegedly shot at the image, triggering hysteria that led to his death, and left a gunshot mark on the left cheek of the Nazareno that is still unrestored by pious, popular demand. However, public historian Xiao Chua interviewed Eugenio “Boy” Jongco, former president of the Hijos de Nazareno - Central, who was an eyewitness to the event. While he did confirm there was a shooting incident and commotion as the procession passed an Iglesia ni Cristo locale along Concepcion Aguila Street in the mid-1980s, he clarified the gun was not aimed at the image. He added that the “hole” in the image's face was a dent already present since its carving, revealed over time as the wood dried and aged.

== Pontifical approbations ==
- Pope Innocent X approved veneration of the image in 1650 as a sacramental, and authorized the establishment of the Confraternity of the Most Holy Jesus Nazarene (Spanish: Cofradía de Nuestro Santo Jesús Nazareno). For most of the Spanish Era, indigenous Filipinos were barred from Holy Orders, while confraternities were groups of laymen and thus an open option for religious life.
- Pope Pius VII granted the image his apostolic blessing in 1880, which granted a plenary indulgence to those who piously pray before the Christological image.
- Pope John Paul II issued a Pontifical decree Qui Loco Petri which raised the shrine to the status of Minor Basilica on 11 December 1987. The decree was signed and notarized by the Vatican Secretary of State, Cardinal Agostino Casaroli. (Note: Ioannes Paulus Secundum, Papam. “Qui Loco Petri” (1987) Sigillium Vaticanus: Prænotanda Numerorum #209—291. Vatican Secret Archives.)

== Pious cult and veneration ==
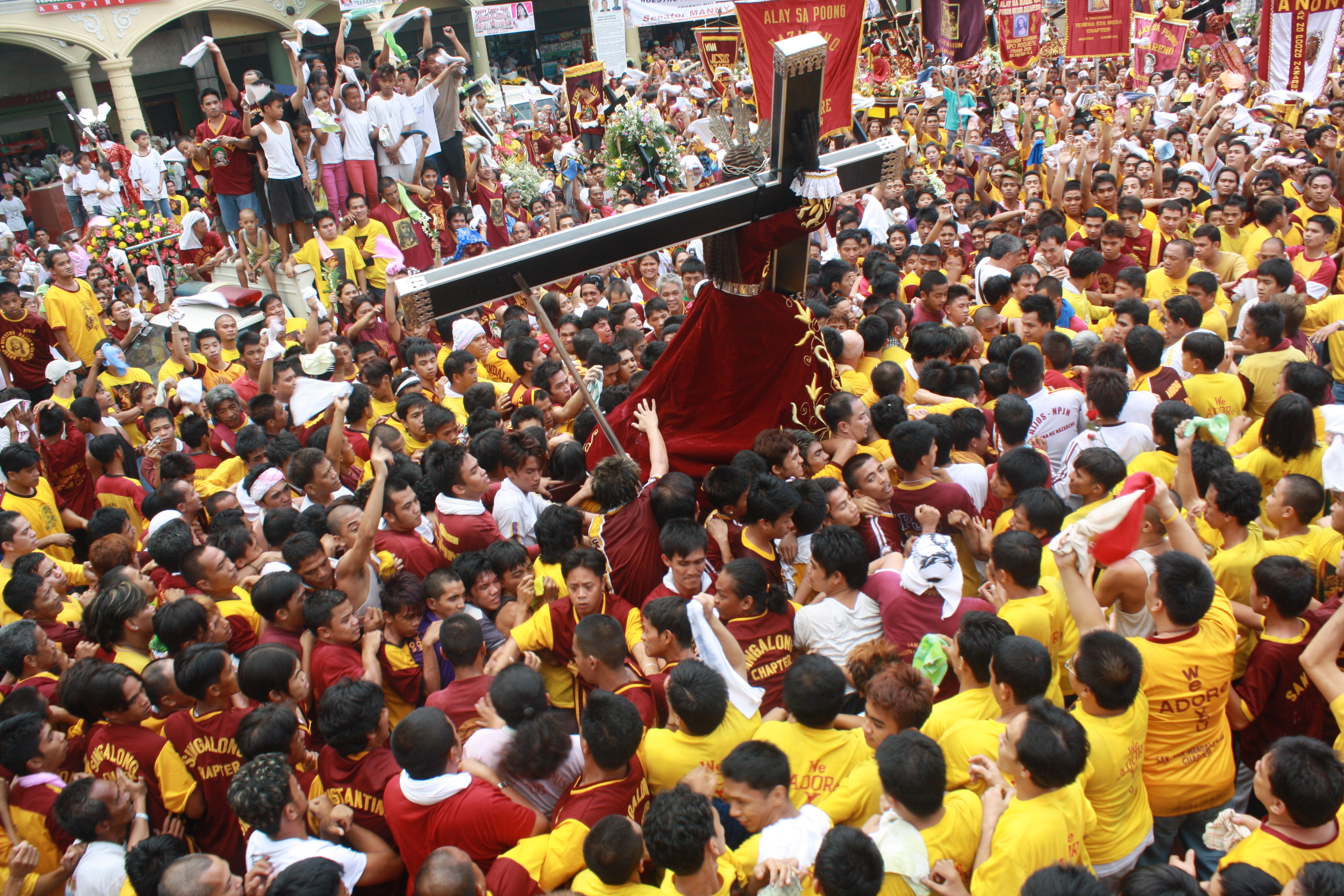
A replica of the Nuestro Padre Jesús Nazareno at Plaza Miranda during the 2011 Traslación.

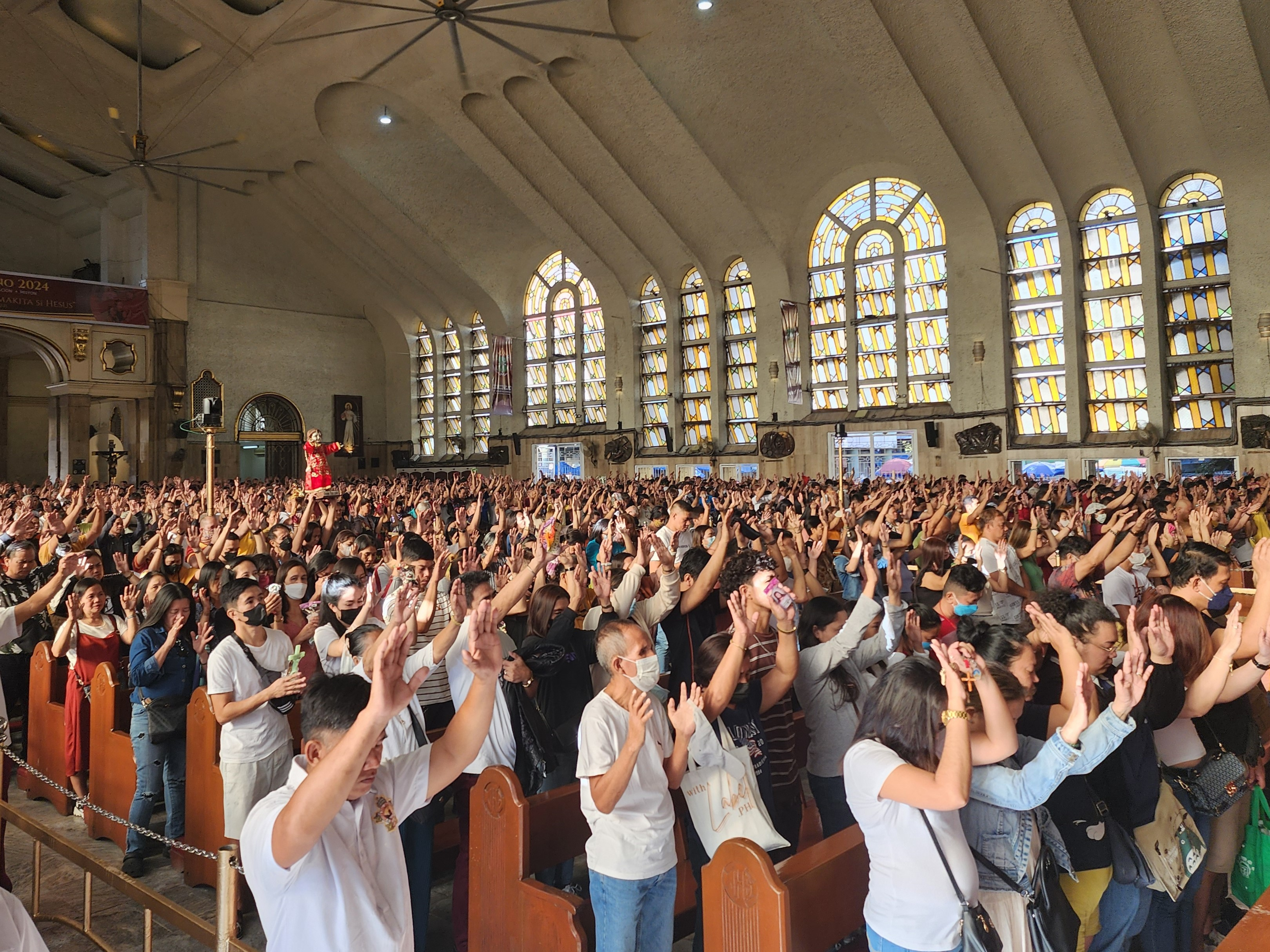
Devotees raise their hands to receive blessings from the Jesús Nazareno following Mass at Quiapo Church.

Veneration of the Jesús Nazareno is rooted among Filipinos who strongly identify with the passion and suffering of Christ the image depicts. Many devotees of the venerated image relate their poverty and daily struggles to the Passion of Christ.

Some believers practice walking in barefoot as a form of piety while others make an effort to ride its carriage in the belief it imparts blessings. Prior to the Second Vatican Council, processions of the image was relatively solemn and peaceful, becoming larger and rowdier in the 1970s.

While the titular patron saint of the basilica is John the Baptist (making its feast day June 24, coinciding with the secular Araw ng Maynila), the Jesús Nazareno and its January 9 Traslación are more popular.

At the end of each Mass said in the basilica, devotees pay homage to the image by clapping their hands. In addition to the novena, Traslación, Pahalík, and the Pabihis, the Pasindí ("lighting", i.e. of votive candles) is another popular devotion, as is the old, reverential custom of creeping on one's knees down the main aisle towards the image on the altar.

All Fridays of the year (except Good Friday) are colloquially known in Metro Manila as "Quiapo Day", since the novena for the image is held on this day nationwide. As with Wednesday (which is comparably called "Baclaran Day"), this day is associated with heavy traffic around the basilica due to the influx of devotees and pilgrims.

The attached Nazarene Catholic School (formerly Quiapo Parochial School) reflects the devotion of school authorities; its official newsletter is likewise named "The Nazarene", with pupils called "Nazareñans."

The largest annual procession for the Nuestro Padre Jesús Nazareno is the January 9 Traslación procession on the Feast of Jesús Nazareno, attracting millions of Catholic devotees, who try to touch or have cloth wiped by the image carriers on the image to obtain its blessings and miraculous powers. Along with Santo Niño (Child Jesus), it is the most popular object of devotion in the Philippines. In 2011, over six million Catholic devotees flocked to the Feast of Jesús Nazareno.

=== Music ===
The hymn Nuestro Padre Jesús Nazareno was composed by National Artist of the Philippines, Lucio San Pedro to honor the image. It is used by the basilica as the official anthem to the image and associated rites.

The statue is also a common image on front covers of the Pasyóng Mahál, an indigenous epic poem on the life, Passion, and death of Jesus, which is chanted every holy Week.

== Claims of indigenous idolatry ==
According to the rector of the basilica, Father José Clemente Ignacio, the image's procession and devotional practices reflect the "Filipino trait to want to wipe, touch, kiss, or embrace sacred objects if possible", and reflect indigenous belief in "the presence of the Divine in sacred objects and places."

According to Jaime Laya, these practices are a modern form of indigenous idolatry, a continuation of the pre-Christian act of revering sacred objects through pious touching (Filipino: hipò, himas). Elizabeth Pisares also states that this is a revision of the idolatry from the pre-colonial era, and suggests its link with social disparities among Filipinos.

According to Mariano Barbato, the debate over the icon comes down to personal interpretations of what constitutes idolatry.

== See also ==
- Feast of the Black Nazarene
- Cristo Negro (Portobelo)
- Black Madonna
- Our Lady of Porta Vaga
- Our Lady of Peace and Good Voyage
- Our Lady of La Naval de Manila
- Santo Niño de Cebú
- List of statues of Jesus
