= Enrique Macaraeg =

Filipino bishop (1955–2023)

His Excellency, The Most Reverend Enrique Macaraeg D.D.
- Bishop of Tarlac
- Metropolis: San Fernando
- Appointed: March 31, 2016
- Installed: May 31, 2016
- Term ended: October 23, 2023
- Predecessor: Florentino Ferrer Cinense
- Successor: Roberto Calara Mallari

Orders
- Ordination: May 19, 1979 by Federico Guba Limon
- Consecration: May 24, 2016 by Socrates Villegas

Personal details
- Born: Enrique de Vera Macaraeg; December 28, 1955 Manila, Philippines
- Died: October 23, 2023 (aged 67) Malasiqui, Pangasinan, Philippines
- Buried: Tarlac Cathedral, Tarlac City, Tarlac
- Education: University of Santo Tomas
- Motto: Vivere Christus est "To live is Christ" (Philippians 1:21)
- Coat of arms

Styles of Enrique Macaraeg
- Reference style: His Excellency; The Most Reverend
- Spoken style: Your Excellency
- Religious style: Bishop

Enrique de Vera Macaraeg (December 28, 1955 – October 23, 2023) was a Filipino prelate of the Roman Catholic Church who served as Bishop of Tarlac from 2016 until his death in 2023.

== Early life and education ==
Enrique de Vera Macaraeg was born in Manila, Philippines. He earned a bachelor's degree in philosophy in 1974, followed by a licentiate in 1976, at the University of Santo Tomas Central Seminary. He also earned a bachelor's degree in theology at the same university in 1979.

== Ministry ==
=== Priesthood ===
Macaraeg was ordained as a priest on May 19, 1979, for the Archdiocese of Lingayen–Dagupan. He subsequently held numerous positions across four parishes in Pangasinan and one in Quezon City, as well as six academic positions in various schools.

=== Episcopal ministry ===
On March 31, 2016, Pope Francis appointed Macaraeg as Bishop of Tarlac, succeeding Florentino Ferrer Cinense. Although the Apostolic Nuncio to the Philippines, Giuseppe Pinto, informed Macaraeg of his appointment on March 22 (Holy Tuesday), it was only made public a few days after Easter. Socrates Villegas, Archbishop of Lingayen–Dagupan and president of the Catholic Bishops' Conference of the Philippines (CBCP), consecrated Macaraeg to the episcopate on May 24, 2016. He was installed on the feast of the Visitation of Mary (May 31).

Macaraeg also served as chairman of the Catholic Bishops' Conference of the Philippines – Episcopal Commission on the Laity (ECLA) until his death. He was succeeded by Severo Caermare (vice chairman of ECLA) on December 15, 2023.

== Death ==
On October 23, 2023, Macaraeg suffered cardiac arrest while playing basketball in Malasiqui, and later died. He was laid to rest on October 31.

Catholic Church titles
Preceded by Florentino Ferrer Cinense	Bishop of Tarlac; May 31, 2016 – October 23, 2023	Succeeded by Roberto Mallari
