= Recoletos Church =

- San Nicolás de Tolentino Church
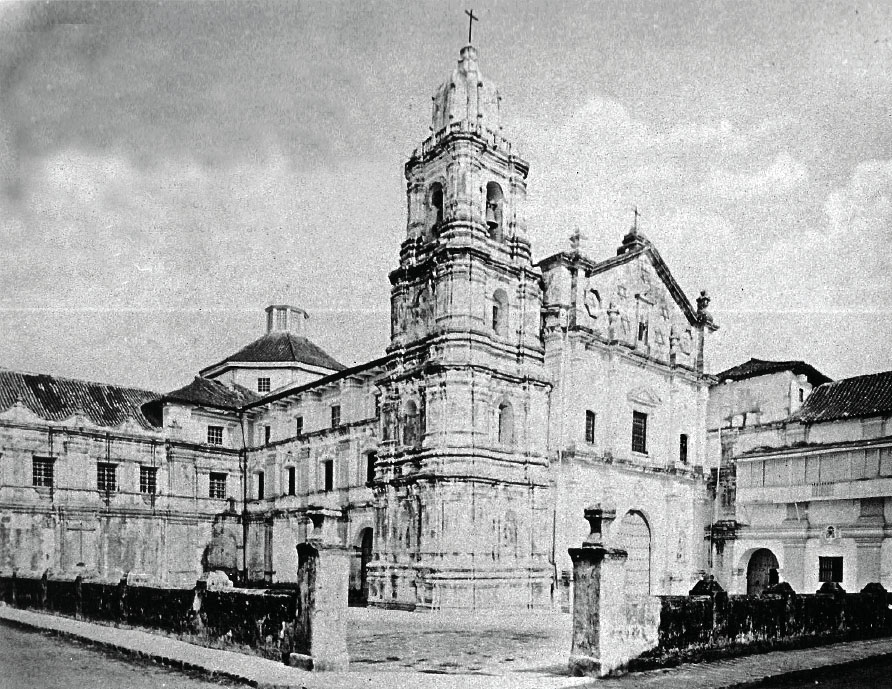
- Church in the late 19th century
- Recoletos Church
- 14°35′16.6″N 120°58′41.4″E
- Country: Philippines
- Denomination: Roman Catholic
- Religious order: Augustinian Recollects

History
- Status: Mother House
- Founded: 1608
- Dedication: Nicholas of Tolentino

Architecture
- Completed: 1608
- Demolished: 1959 (Note: Last church building was destroyed in 1945. Ruins were cleared in 1959. Between 1608 and 1945, the church has been destroyed and built numerous times.)

Administration
- Province: San Nicolás de Tolentino

The San Nicolás de Tolentino Church commonly known as Recoletos Church was a Roman Catholic church within Intramuros in Manila, Philippines.

It was established and managed by the Order of Augustinian Recollects in the Philippines, China, Japan and the Mariana Islands.

== History ==
=== Earlier buildings ===
The Augustinian Recollects founded the San Nicolás de Tolentino Church. The first church and convent buildings was erected in 1608 with Bernardino del Castillo donating 100,000 peso for its construction. The first church was made of stone.

The complex was destroyed by earthquake on November 30, 1645. It was rebuilt but was again destroyed by an earthquake on August 20, 1658, by another earthquake.

The Agustinos Recoletos states that the structure built after the 1658 earthquake was the one which lasted till 1945.

However the National Historical Institute marker noted that a newly constructed building collapsed in 1722 and that the most recent structure was built in 1780.

It was noted to be damaged in 1880 by an earthquake and a typhoon in 1905.

=== Last church building ===
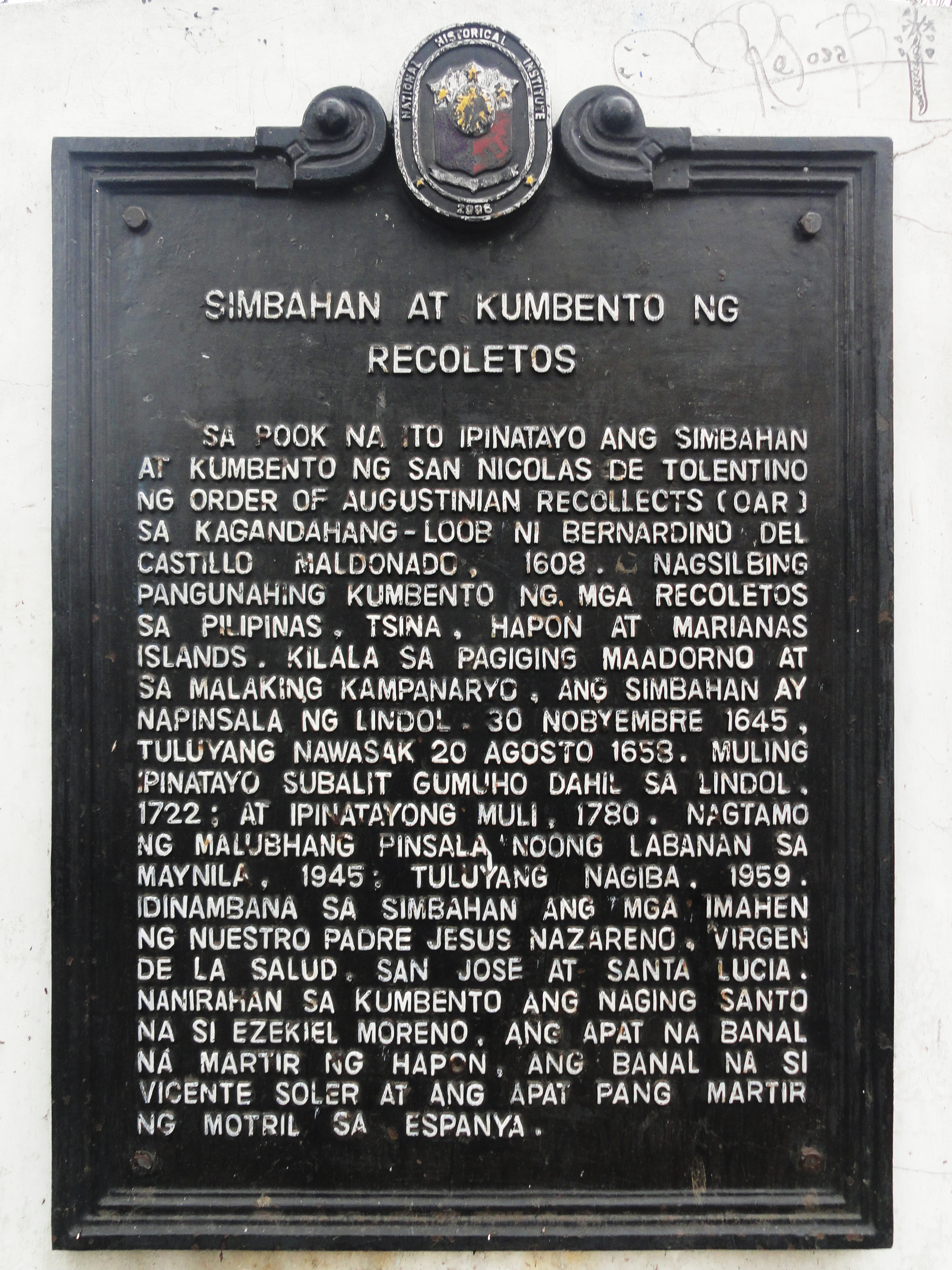
Historical marker installed by the National Historical Institute (now National Historical Commission of the Philippines) at the site of the church

The last Recoletos Church was significantly damaged during the Battle of Manila in February 1945 during World War II. Its ruins was left to stand until 1959.

The Manila Bulletin built its headquarters on the site of the former Recoletos Church from 1976 to 1977.

== Devotion ==
The Recoletos Church had the Nuestro Padre Jesus Nazareno of Intramuros as its cult The image of Jesus Christ at the church is considered as the "original Black Nazarene" and assumed to have been brought by the Recollects.

The San Nicolás image was known as the Nazareno Guapo (Spanish, "Handsome Nazarene") or the Nazareno ng Mayaman (Tagalog, "Nazareno of the Rich") due to it being mostly accessible to more affluent Spanish devotees.

A second image was commissioned and brought over from Mexico in the early 17th century. This image made for native devotees was dubbed as Nazareno Itím ("Black Nazarene") or the Nazareno ng Mahirap ("Nazarene of the Poor"). This image was later transferred to Quiapo Church sometime between 1767 and 1787, and this translation is the origin of the Feast of the Black Nazarene.

The Nazareno Guapo was destroyed along with the last church building in 1945 Battle of Manila.
