= Nazarene Catholic School =

Roman Catholic school in Manila, Philippines

Coordinates: 14°35′57″N 120°59′13″E

The Nazarene Catholic School is a private Catholic school located in Quiapo, Manila. It was formerly known as the Quiapo Parochial School (QPS) from 1951 until 2005, when its name was changed to Nazarene Catholic School in honor of the Black Nazarene.

== Establishment–1978 ==
- 1951 - It was founded in June by Vicente Fernandez, the parish priest of St. John the Baptist Parish, helped by Emma B. Araneta, president of the Catholic Women's League and Rustico Burce, who became the first principal of the school. The engineering firm, the Pedro Siochi and Company, supervised the building's construction. This was already the last infrastructure project of Pedro A. Siochi because of his death after.

- The school also offered kindergarten, complete elementary and high school classes, and adult education night classes with the seven-year elementary course.

- 1952 - The five-year secondary course started in June 1952. The grade school evening class was recognized by the government on June 1, 1951.
- 1955 - The complete Academic Secondary Course was recognized on April 16, 1955.
- 1958 - The secondary evening classes were established by the government on June 6, 1958.
- 1975 - Jose Abriol, parish priest of the Minor Basilica of the Black Nazarene, purchased a spacious lot in R. Hidalgo Street with funds donated by the devotees of Jesus the Nazarene.
- 1977 - Cardinal Jaime Sin blessed and laid the cornerstone of the new school building on September 18, 1977.
- 1978 - Through the invitation of . Abriol, the Sisters of St. Paul of Chartres started supervising the school on April 25, 1978. Abriol became the school director; Angeline Animatea de Jesus, high school principal; Milagros Checa, grade school principal; Consolacion Bello, treasurer; and Nora Giron, high school religion coordinator.

- On October 7, 1978, Jaime Sin delegated Leonardo Legaspi to bless and inaugurate the newly built three-storey concrete edifice of QPS.

- Another lot which is across QPS was bought and another school building was constructed to house the grade school pupils.

== 1979–1994 ==
- 1979 - 1994 - The Sisters of St. Paul of Chartres were able to uphold and realize the vision, mission and goals of the school during their stay.
- 1990 - The administration bought the Pacific Star Building during this year because of the annual steady rise of enrollees.

=== From 1995 ===
- 1995 - New set of administration took over in 1995. Ofelia S. Meneses became the new principal, Bienvenido Mercado was appointed new director.
- 2000 - In the great Jubilee Year of the church, Teodoro J. Buhain became the new director of the school.
- 2001 - The Golden Jubilee Year of QPS was celebrated. In the same year, the grade school personnel gave its signal to undergo the Preliminary Self-Survey using the questionnaires of the educational accreditation body Philippine Accrediting Association of Schools, Colleges and Universities (PAASCU).
- 2002 - On March 7–8, 2002 a PAASCU visiting team came to school.
- 2004 - The grade school department passed Level II Accreditation. In April of the same year, Gerardo O. Santos was appointed school director.

- The high school department had its Preliminary Survey Visit on November 18–19, 2004.

In 2005 the leaders of the school administration adopted a new name, the "Nazarene Catholic School".

As of press time, both elementary and high school departments of the school are accredited by PAASCU.

== Student life ==
As in most private high schools in the country, the students wore uniform school apparel. A boy's attire was white collared polo buttoned shirt with attached school patch, and black slacks with matching black shoes. A girl's attire was white blouse with ribbon hung in the middle, and maroon skirt with the approved pleats and design.

The informal term for the school is "Parochial," i.e. "Sa Parochial ako nag-aaral" (I am studying in Parochial).

=== Prefect of Discipline ===
The main responsibility of the Office of the Prefect of Discipline is to monitor and reprimand, and sometimes discipline, students who misbehave, as laid down by the "Student Handbook". Deportment is included in the overall rating of a student's performance, in the case of deadlocks in academic grades.

=== Guidance counselor ===
The Office of the Guidance Counselor principally deals with students' performance in academic subjects.

=== Non-academic student organizations ===
- Student Coordinating Board / Student Council
  - Annual Leadership Conference
  - Boys and Girls Week Program
- Citizen Army Training I
- The Nazarene Official News Organ
  - Publication of newsletters
  - Participation in and winning region-level and national-level journalism press conferences
  - Training for writers and staff
- Glee Club / Chorale
  - Participation in and winning national-level chorale competitions
- Social Community Service Club
  - Regular feeding program
  - Counseling activities to families within the vicinity, especially in the slum areas
- Senior Boy Scouts of the Philippines
  - Badge earning
  - Rank / Recognition for members
- Basketball Varsity Boys Team
- Volleyball Varsity Girls Team
- Volleyball Varsity Boys Team

=== Sponsored by academic departments ===
- Math Club
  - Annual Math Quiz Bee
  - participating in and winning region-level competitions
- Science Club
  - Investigatory Project
  - Science Camp
- Filipino Club
  - Annual Theater Presentations
- English Club
  - Annual Spelling Bee Competition

== Local parish community involvement ==
The school is under the administration of Saint John the Baptist Parish in Manila, commonly known as Quiapo Church, the seat of the Black Nazarene; appointments are usually given by the Manila Archbishop of the day. From time to time, the school - through the different student organizations like the Social Community Service Club - coordinates with the parish leadership and personnel to provide various assistance to residents within the vicinity.
