= Roberto Mallari =

Filipino Catholic Bishop

His Excellency, The Most Reverend Roberto Mallari D.D.
- Bishop of Tarlac
- Province: San Fernando
- Diocese: Tarlac
- Appointed: December 29, 2024
- Installed: March 27, 2025
- Predecessor: Enrique Macaraeg
- Previous posts: Bishop of San Jose in Nueva Ecija (2012–2024); Auxiliary Bishop of San Fernando and Titular Bishop of Titular Bishop of Erdonia (2006–2012)

Orders
- Ordination: November 27, 1982 by Oscar Cruz
- Consecration: March 27, 2006 by Ricardo Vidal

Personal details
- Born: Roberto Calara Mallari; March 27, 1958 (age 68) Masantol, Pampanga, Philippines
- Education: San Carlos Seminary
- Motto: In Manus Tuas (Into your Hands)

Ordination history
History
Diaconal ordination
- Ordained by: Gaudencio Rosales
Priestly ordination
- Ordained by: Oscar Cruz
Episcopal consecration
- Principal consecrator: Ricardo Vidal
- Co-consecrators: Socrates Villegas; Honesto Ongtioco
- Styles
- Reference style: His Excellency; The Most Reverend
- Spoken style: Your Excellency
- Religious style: Bishop

Roberto “Bobet” Calara Mallari (born March 27, 1958) is a Filipino prelate of the Catholic Church. He is the fourth Bishop of Tarlac, serving in the position since 2025. He previously served as Bishop of Diocese of San Jose from 2012 to 2024 and Auxiliary bishop of Archdiocese of San Fernando from 2006 to 2012.

== Biography and priesthood years ==
Mallari was born in Masantol, Pampanga, Philippines, on March 27, 1958. After completing philosophical and theological studies at San Carlos Seminary in Makati, he was ordained a deacon of the Archdiocese of San Fernando on March 15, 1982, and a priest of the same on November 27, 1982.

Following his ordination, he served in various roles throughout the archdiocese, including as a pastor at local churches and as a spiritual director and philosophy director at Mother of Good Counsel Seminary in San Fernando, Pampanga.

== Episcopate ==
On January 14, 2006, Mallari was appointed titular bishop of Erdonia and auxiliary bishop of the Archdiocese of San Fernando by Pope Benedict XVI. He was ordained a bishop on his 48th birthday on 27 March 2006, with Cardinal Ricardo Vidal as principal consecrator. In June 2007, he became a member and the executive secretary of the Episcopal Commission on Family and Life of the Catholic Bishops' Conference of the Philippines (CBCP).

On May 15, 2012, he was named bishop of the Diocese of San Jose Nueva Ecija by Pope Benedict XVI, and was installed on July 10, 2012. He succeeded Mylo Hubert Vergara who was appointed as Bishop of Pasig in 2011.

After the 2017 killing of Fr. Marcelito Paez, Mallari condemned the crime, called for justice and swift investigation. Paez served as a priest in the Diocese of San Jose before retiring. In 2018, Mallari initiated an organic farming training among the farm workers and their families within the Diocese of San Jose's area of jurisdiction. In 2019, he said that child labor is a challenging problem for the Church and the Philippine society and called for cooperation in solving the child labor problem in the country.

From 2015 to 2021, Mallari served as the chairman of the CBCP's Episcopal Commission on Catechesis and Catholic Education (ECCCE). As the chairman of the said commission, he had aired his comments on several issues about the Philippine education system.

In June 2017, he agreed with the proposal of the Philippine Drug Enforcement Agency's to mandatorily test for drugs the teachers and students. Mallari said that the said proposal will prevent the children to be involved with drugs. During the 2017 World Teachers' Day, he expressed support and gratitude towards the teachers and said that their role is important in youth development and reminded them their social responsibility.

He also said his concern about the 2019 closure of 58 Lumad schools in Davao Region by the Philippine government because these schools were allegedly linked to the New People's Army's activity in the area. He said that this was a "failure" of the government to ensure the security of the students and the region's education system.

In October 2019, Mallari rejected the idea that separating girls and boys in schools will lower the teenage pregnancy and HIV infection in the country. This after the National Youth Commission earlier proposed to have separated rooms for boys and girls in schools to curb the said health issues.

During the COVID-19 pandemic in the Philippines, Mallari said in mid-2020 that internet should be maximized for the students' online learning although he agreed that not all students and their families are capable of the said medium. Later that year, he said that education is one of the most "challenged" sectors during the pandemic and said the schools should find ways for alternative learning medium if online learning is not possible.

On December 29, 2024, he was named the fourth bishop of Tarlac by Pope Francis. The announcement coincided with the Feast of the Holy Family. His installation was held at the Tarlac Cathedral on March 27, 2025, presided by Apostolic Nuncio Charles John Brown.

Catholic Church titles
Preceded by Enrique Macaraeg	Bishop of Tarlac; March 27, 2025 – present	Incumbent
Preceded by Mylo Hubert Vergara	Bishop of San Jose; July 10, 2012 – December 29, 2024	Succeeded by Samuel Agcaracar
New title	— TITULAR — Titular Bishop of Erdonia; March 27, 2006 – May 15, 2012	Succeeded by Robert John Brennan
