= Sabino Vengco =

Filipino priest, theologian and author (1942–2021)

Rev. Msgr. Msgr. Sabino A. Vengco, Jr. H.P.
- Born: Sabino Azurin Vengco, Jr. March 9, 1942; Hagonoy, Bulacan, Philippines
- Died: May 17, 2021 (aged 79); San Juan, Metro Manila, Philippines
- Education: Doctor of Sacred Theology in Trier, Germany
- Alma mater: San Jose Seminary
- Occupations: Priest; liturgist, Mariologist; author; seminary professor/theologian
- Years active: 1965–2021
- Church: Catholic Church
- Ordained: December 21, 1965
- Writings: Jesukristo, Puso ko'y Nagpupuri, On the Eurcharist, Shaping the Filipino Marian Piety
- Congregations served: Diocesan Priest from the Diocese of Malolos
- Title: Doctor of Sacred Theology

Sabino Azurin Vengco, Jr., H.P. (March 9, 1942 – May 17, 2021) was a Filipino priest, theologian, and author.

== Biography ==
Sabino Azurin Vengco, Jr. was born on March 9, 1942, in Hagonoy, Bulacan, Philippines.

He completed his priestly studies at the San Jose Seminary in 1965; he was ordained on 1965.

He has served at the theology department of the San Carlos Seminary as professor (1974 to 2021), department head and dean. He also taught at the Loyola School of Studies at the Ateneo de Manila University (1977 to 2021), Jaime Cardinal Sin Professorial Chair for Philippine Marian Studies, the Immaculate Conception Seminary of the Diocese of Malolos, as Dean of Studies and Prefect of Discipline from 1986 to 1996, the University of Santo Tomas School of Ecclesiastical Studies (1978 to 1980 and 2007 to 2021) and at the Recoletos School of Theology (1978 to 1980 and 2007 to 2021). He also taught as the Immaculate Conception Major Seminary (1986 to 2021) and Mother of Good Counsel Minor Seminary in San Fernando, Pampanga (1986 to 1987 and 2018 to 2019). He served as Dean of Studies and Prefect of the Archdiocese of Manila’s San Carlos Seminary Graduate School of Theology in Makati (1978 to 1985).

In 1986, Vengco and Bishop Cirilo Almario, Jr. co-established the ICMAS Graduate School of Theology. He was a seminary formator, professor of liturgy, and served the sick and elderly diocesan priests.

Vengco published several books on theology and Mariology. He also wrote for various newspapers such as the Manila Times and the Business Mirror.

He founded the Kadiwa sa Pagkapari Foundation Inc., as chair until 2021, which aims to provide foster care for retired priests.

He died on May 17, 2021, at the Cardinal Santos Medical Center, from COVID-19. He was buried at the Libingan ng mga Paring Taga Hagonoy, Hagonoy Church on May 21, 2021.

== Awards ==
- Outstanding Catholic Author (1989) - Ateneo de Manila University
- Bukas Palad award (2003) - Ateneo de Manila University
- "Serviam" award (2006) - Catholic Mass Media Awards
- San Jose Award (Outstanding Alumnus) (2009) - San Jose Seminary
- Gawad Sagisag Quezon (2009) - Komisyon ng Wikang Filipino
- Dangal ng Lipi (Panglilingkod sa Pampamayanan) (2010) - Bulacan provincial government
- Festschrift (2022) - Compilation of writings about his life - Guiguinto ICMAS Graduate School of Theology's “Rowers”
