= Diocese of Tarlac =

Latin Catholic diocese in the Philippines

Diocese of Tarlac Dioecesis Tarlacensis Diocesis ning Tarlac Diocesis ti Tarlac Diyosesis ng Tarlac Diócesis de Tarlac

Catholic
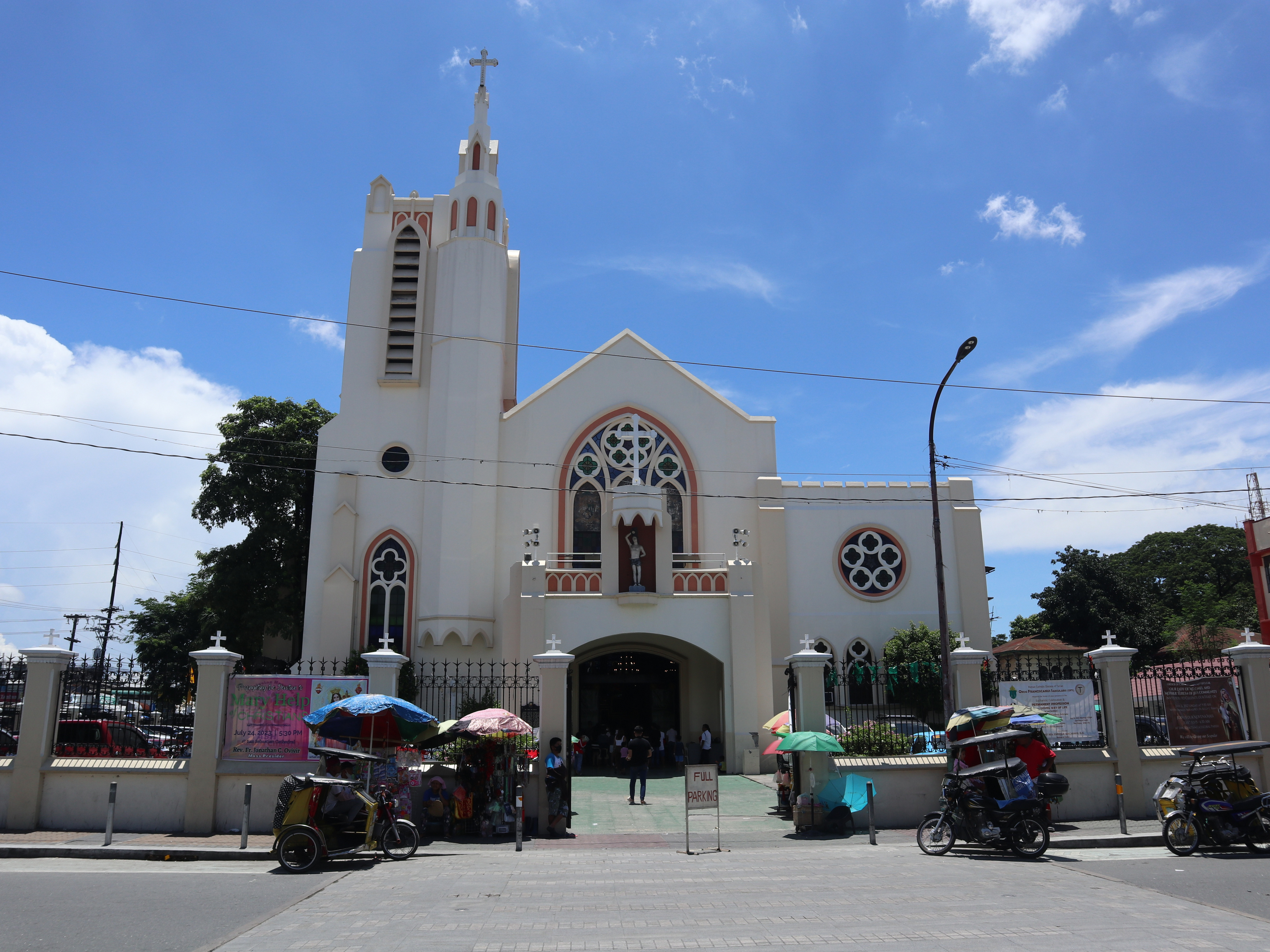
- Tarlac Cathedral

- Coat of arms

Location
- Country: Philippines
- Territory: Tarlac
- Ecclesiastical province: San Fernando
- Metropolitan: San Fernando
- Coordinates: 15°29′15″N 120°35′18″E

Statistics
- Area: 3,053 km^{2} (1,179 sq mi)
- Population: Total; Catholics: (as of 2021); 1,503,456; 1,202,764 (80%)
- Parishes: 70

Information
- Denomination: Catholic
- Sui iuris church: Latin Church
- Rite: Roman Rite
- Established: February 16, 1963; 63 years ago
- Cathedral: Cathedral-Parish of St. Sebastian
- Patron saint: Sebastian
- Secular priests: 105

Current leadership
- Pope: Leo XIV
- Bishop: Roberto Calara Mallari
- Metropolitan Archbishop: Florentino Lavarias
- Vicar General: Jason Canlas Aguilar
- Bishops emeritus: Florentino Ferrer Cinense

Website
- Diocese of Tarlac

The Diocese of Tarlac (Latin: Dioecesis Tarlacensis) is a Latin Catholic diocese comprising the whole civil province of Tarlac (except Camp Servillano Aquino in San Miguel, Tarlac City, which belongs to the Military Ordinariate) in the Philippines. The see is the Saint Sebastian Cathedral in Tarlac City.

== History ==
On February 16, 1963, the Diocese of Tarlac was created from territories from both the Diocese of San Fernando and the Archdiocese of Lingayen-Dagupan. It is part of the Ecclesiastical Province of San Fernando, Pampanga.

Enrique V. Macaraeg, Tarlac's third bishop was appointed bishop by Pope Francis on March 31, 2016. He was ordained on May 24, 2016, and installed on May 31, 2016. Macaraeg died in office on October 23, 2023 due to cardiac arrest, which left the diocese vacant for more than a year.

On December 29, 2024, Pope Francis appointed Roberto Mallari, then bishop of San Jose, as the fourth Bishop of Tarlac. He was canonically installed at the Tarlac Cathedral on March 27, 2025.

== Ordinaries ==
No.	Bishop	Period in office	Notes	Coat of arms
1	Jesus Juan Acosta Sison	May 11, 1963 – January 21, 1988 (24 years, 255 days)	Resigned	
2	Florentino Ferrer Cinense	January 21, 1988 – March 31, 2016 (28 years, 70 days)	Retired from office	
3	Enrique de Vera Macaraeg	May 31, 2016 – October 23, 2023 (7 years, 145 days)	Died in office	
4	Roberto Calara Mallari	March 27, 2025 – present (1 year, 203 days)		

=== Coadjutor Bishop ===
No.	Bishop	Period in office	Notes
1	Florentino Ferrer Cinense	August 17, 1985 – January 21, 1988 (2 years, 157 days)	Succeeded Bishop Sison in 1988

== See also ==
- Catholic Church in the Philippines
- List of Catholic dioceses in the Philippines
