= Santiago Apostol Church (Plaridel) =

Roman Catholic church in Bulacan, Philippines

Plaridel Church
- Saint James the Apostle Parish Church
- Santiago Apostol Church; Quingua Church
- Parokya ni Santiago Apostol (Filipino)
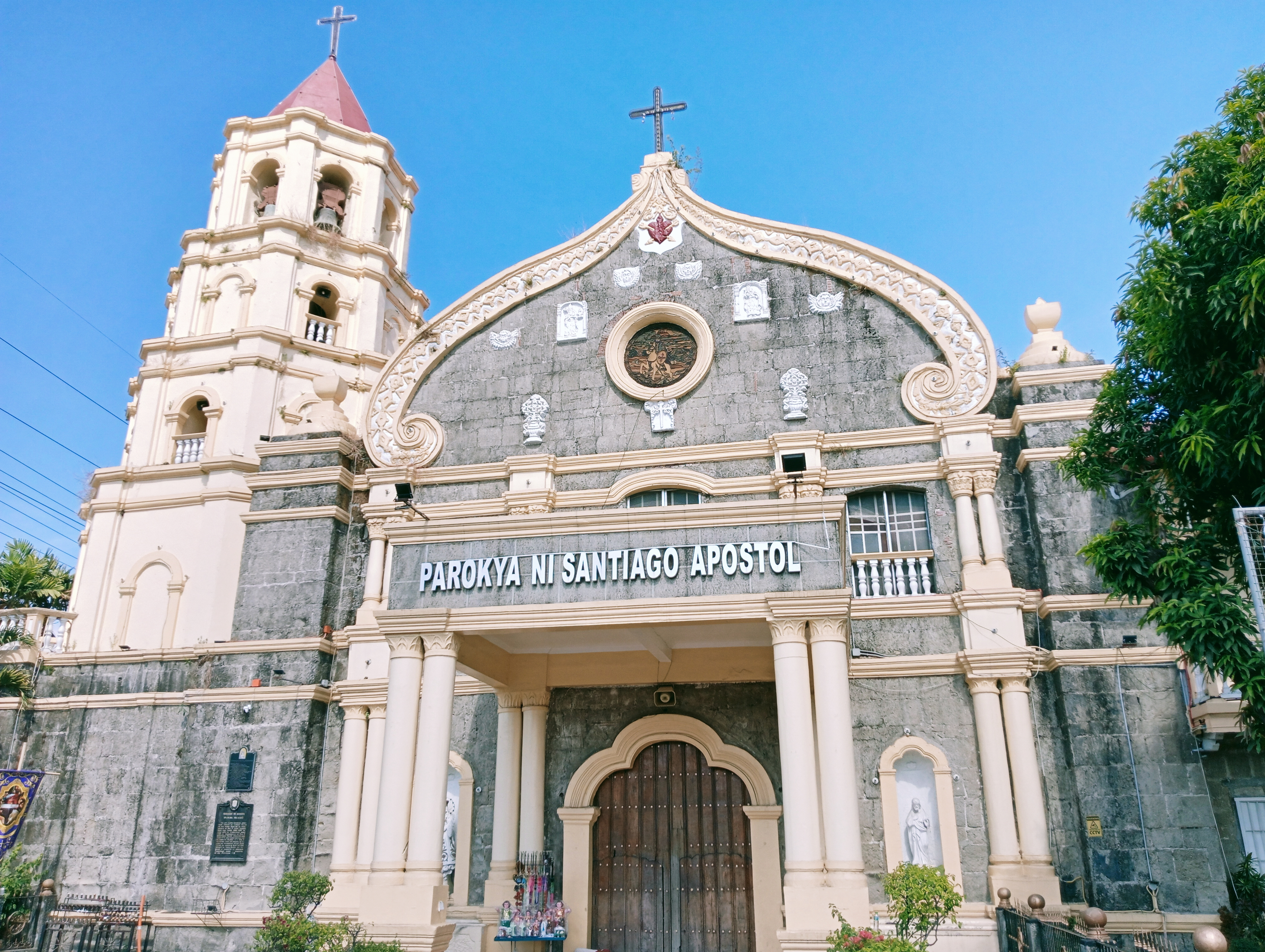
- Church façade in 2024

- Location within Bulacan Location within Luzon Location within Philippines
- 14°53′09″N 120°51′36″E
- Location: Poblacion, Plaridel, Bulacan
- Country: Philippines
- Denomination: Roman Catholic

History
- Status: Parish church
- Founded: September 27, 1602
- Consecrated: April 4, 1999

Architecture
- Functional status: Active
- Heritage designation: With Marker from the National Historical Institute
- Architectural type: Church building
- Style: Baroque

Specifications
- Materials: Sand, gravel, cement, mortar, steel and bricks

Administration
- District: Western District (Vicariate of St. James the Apostle (Plaridel))
- Diocese: Malolos
- Deanery: St. James (Plaridel)

Clergy
- Bishop: Dennis Cabanada Villarojo
- Priest: Rev. Fr. Rufino L. Sulit (Parish Priest) Rev Fr. Jowel Karlo San Luis (Parochial Vicar) Rev Fr. Kirth Stephen Buluran (Guest Priest) Rev Fr. Avelino Santos (Guest Priest)

Saint James the Apostle Parish Church, also known as Santiago Apostol Church, Plaridel Church or Quingua Church, is a 15th-century Roman Catholic church under the patronage of Saint James the Apostle and is located along Gov. Padilla street, Brgy. Poblacion, in Plaridel, Bulacan, Philippines. It is under the jurisdiction of the Diocese of Malolos. In 1961, a historical marker was installed on the church by the National Historical Committee (precursor of the National Historical Commission of the Philippines).

== History ==
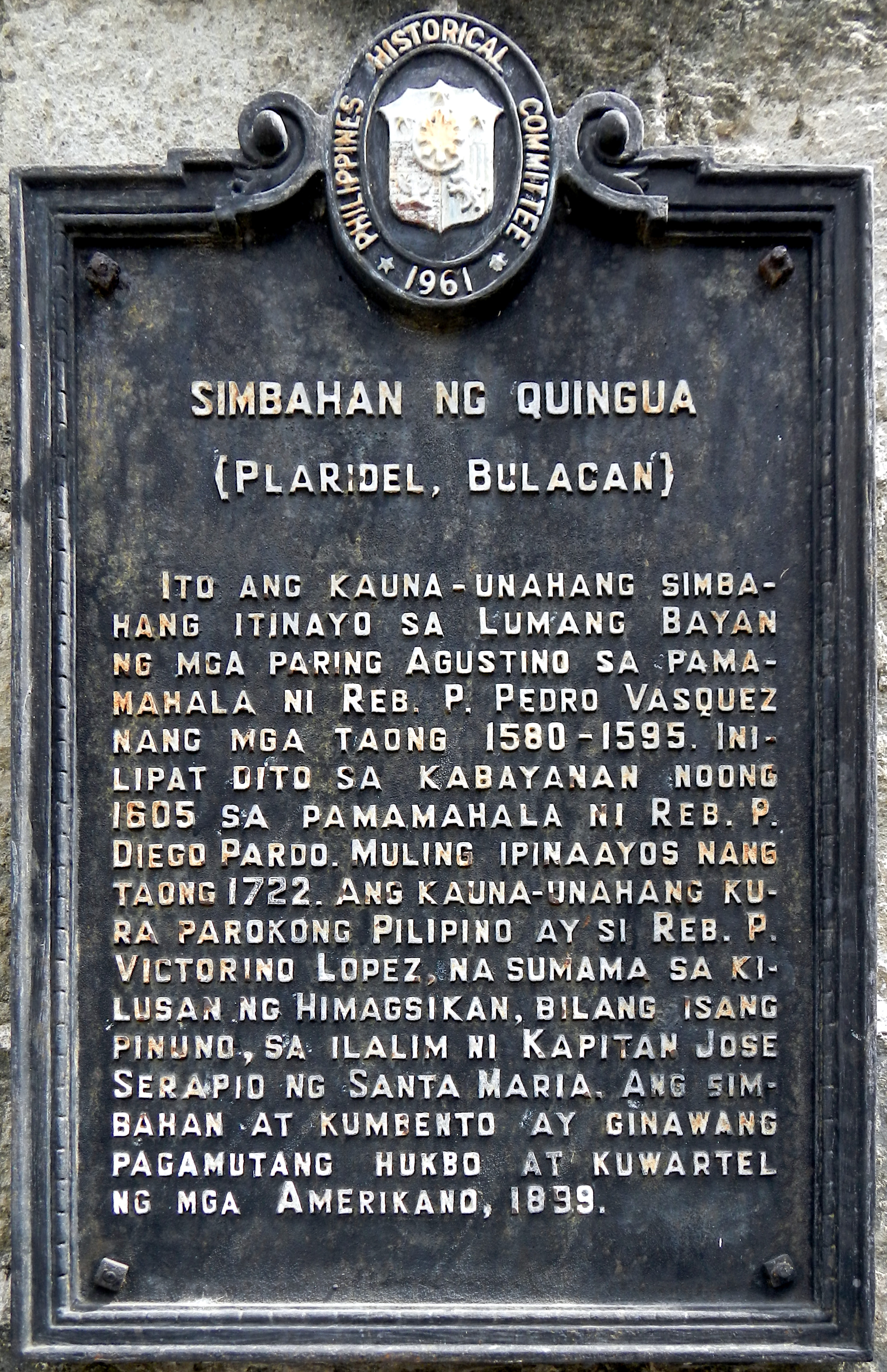
Church PHC historical marker installed in 1961

The church of Plaridel, or Quingua was first established as one of the visitas of Malolos in 1581 and Fray Mateo Mendoza OSA who administered the Malolos Convent began the Christianization of Encomienda Binto y Quingua. It was located in a barrio now called "Lumangbayan" the mission chapel was soon transferred to its present location across the river Quingua (now known as Angat River) because of frequent flooding. Due to long distance of Malolos Convent to the Visita of Binto making the friars to be physically exhausted, the Augustinian prior of Malolos Fray Roque de Barrionuevo made the elevation of Visita of Binto into a Quasi-Parish on September 27, 1602. On April 30, 1605, Quingua was officially established as a full pledge Parish with Fray. Diego Pardo OSA as its first parish priest under the advocacy of Santiago de Matamoro. A Church was built on the new location starting 1602 and took 15 years to complete. The adobe stones used in the church were from the town of Meycauayan while the bricks used were made at Sitio Nabugtos at Brgy. Sta. Ines. In the year 1612, Quingua already had its own convent and 1,800 parishioners. It is said that the parish was not as wealthy as other convents in the Provincia de Bulacan during that time and that it was exempted from its fees to the Augustinian Province in the Philippines located at the San Agustin Church, Intramuros, from 1640 to 1704. The 1605 church was razed by fire after being hit by lightning. As a result, in 1722 a new church was built by Fr. Tomas Quijano on the same site. In 1772, the church was razed by fire once more but was quickly rebuilt. During the British Invasion in the 18th century, some of the treasures and documents owned by the San Agustin Monastery in Intramuros were transferred to the convent of Quingua. The church suffered immensely from an earthquake in 1863 but was repaired the same year. According to the historical marker installed by the National Historical Committee, the church also served as a military hospital and cuartel by the Americans in 1899.

Long administered by the Archdiocese of Manila, on March 11, 1962, with the establishment of the Roman Catholic Diocese of Malolos, the Quingua Church and Convent administration and ownership was transferred to the Diocese of Malolos, making Quingua Church the center of one of the original nine vicariates of Malolos, the Vicariate of Plaridel or the Vicariate of Santiago Apostol comprising the parishes in the municipalities of Calumpit, Balagtas (Bigaa), Guiguinto, Baliwag, Pulilan and Plaridel (Quingua).

== Architecture ==
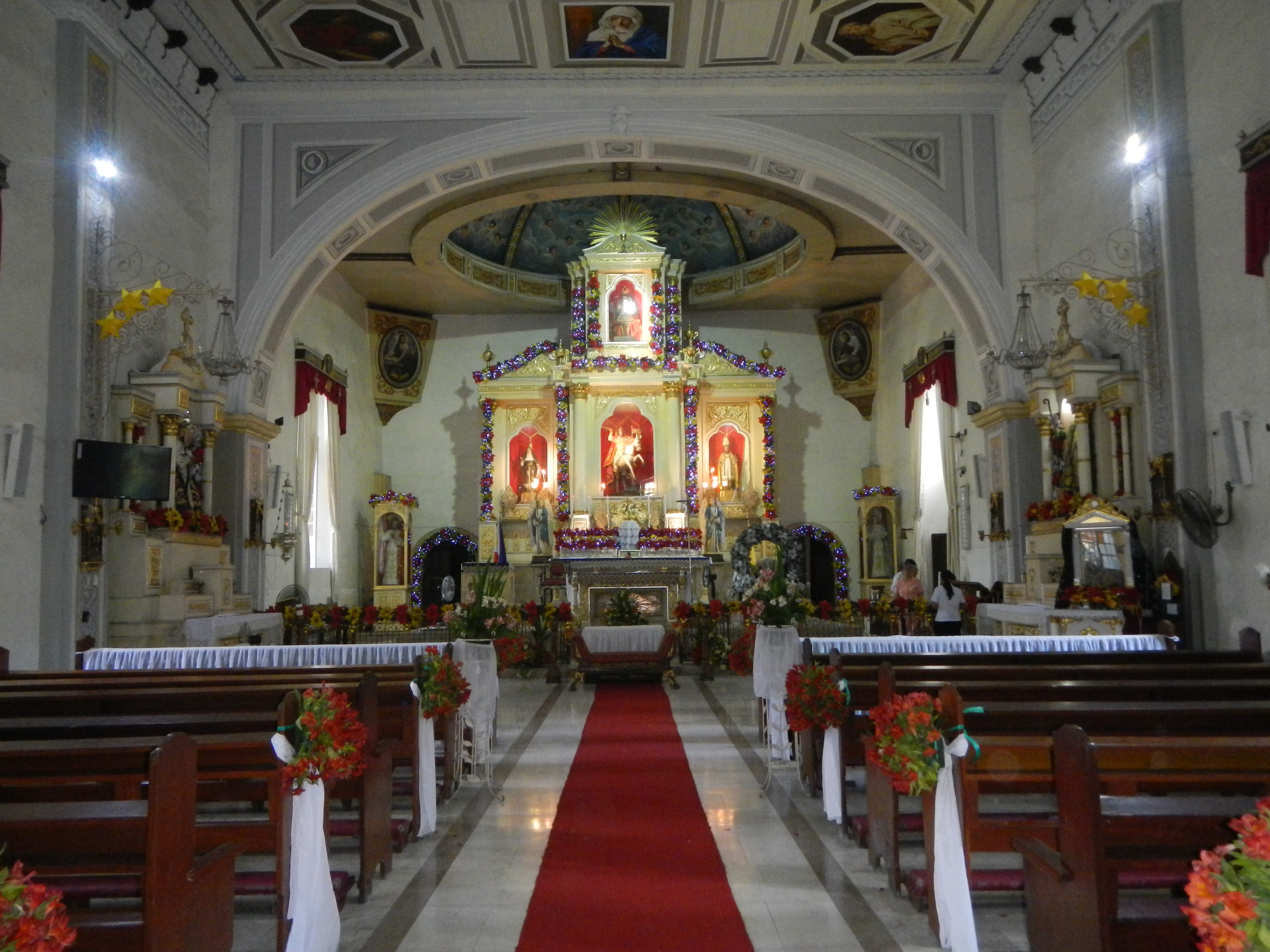
Church interior in 2015

The present stone and brick church is barn-style Baroque mixed with Moorish ornamentation. The first level of the façade consists of a main trefoil arch doorway flanked by two niches of saints. The second level, with its three windows, is plainly adorned by four pairs of pillars. The pointed arch shaped pediment (resembling a minaret), on the other hand, is richly ornamented with carvings of cherubs, saints and other embellishments surrounding the oculus or rose window. At the peak of the pediment is a carving of the pierced heart of Jesus, a symbol of the Augustinian Order. Attached to left of the façade is the five-storey bell tower with a quadrilateral base and octagonal upper levels and topped by a cone-shaped dome. There are five bells in the belfry, the biggest of which is dedicated to Nuestra Senora de la Consolación.

== Simborio Chapel ==
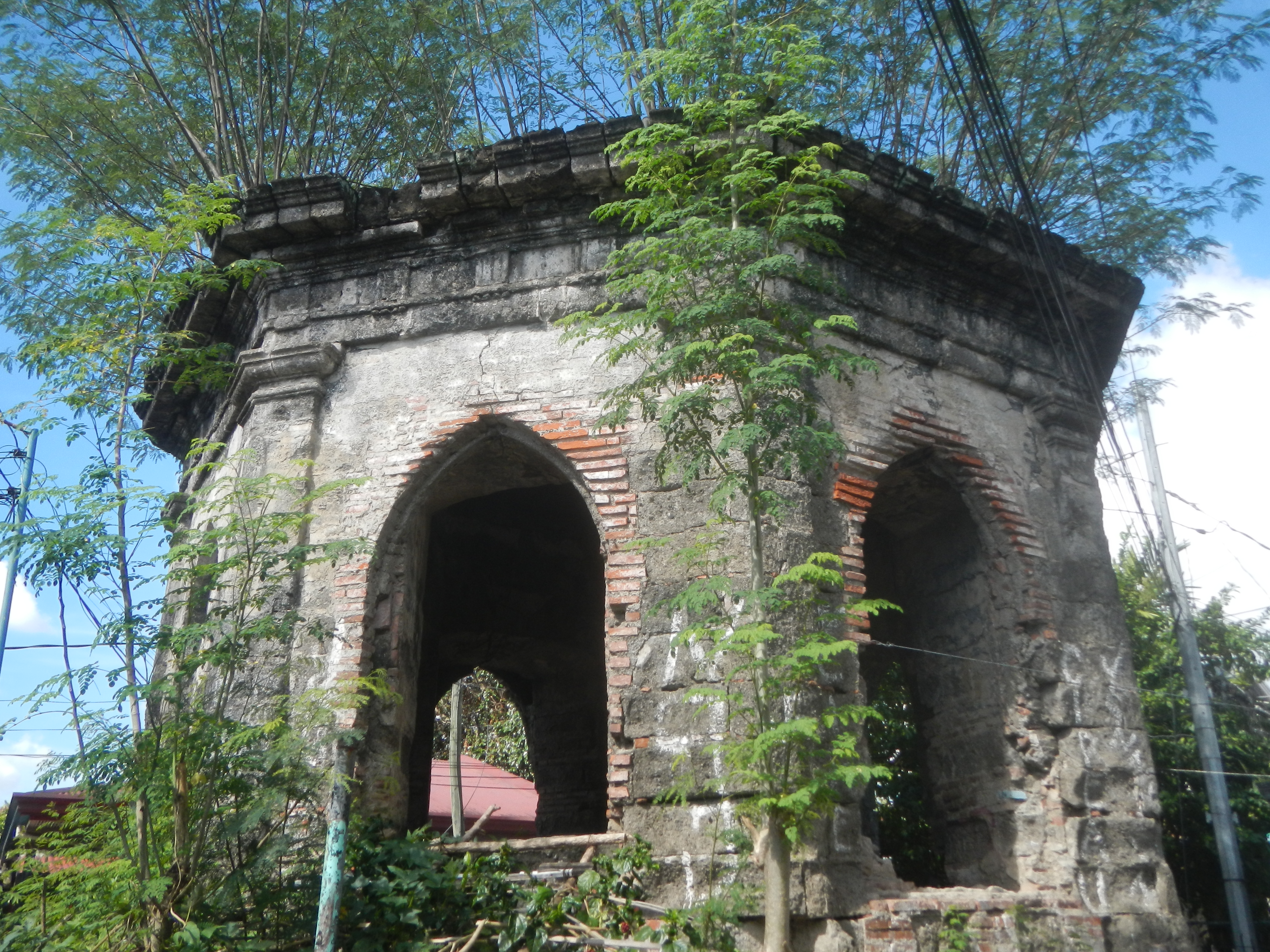
Simborio Chapel in 2020

Near the church is an octagonal chapel locally known as the Simborio Chapel. Believed to have been built in the 1800s, the chapel may have functioned as a mortuary chapel although its current location in a residential area is a few meters away from the Catholic cemetery. The chapel features pointed arch windows and semicircular niches on its base.

In the documentary "Sineliksik Bulacan: Pamana ng Lahi, Yaman aking Ipagmamalaki," the Simborio was said to have been built by an Augustinian priest, Padre Nemesio García, OSA.

== Daughter parishes ==
Daughter parishes of Plaridel Church
Parish	Separation year	Location
St. Isidore the Laborer Parish	1749	Pulilan, Bulacan
St. Augustine Parish	1733	Baliuag, Bulacan
St. John of God Parish	1750	San Rafael, Bulacan
St. Ildephonse of Toledo Parish	1809	San Ildefonso, Bulacan
St. Michael the Archangel Parish	1947	Dampol, Plaridel, Bulacan
Holy Angels Parish	1999	San Jose, Plaridel, Bulacan

== Chapels subdued ==
Chapel	Location
San Clemente Chapel	Parulan
San Isidro Chapel	Sitio Sumilang
San Vicente Ferrer Chapel	Bagong Silang
San Francisco & Sta. Clara Chapel	Banga 2nd
San Padre Pio Chapel	La Mirada Subd.
San Antonio de Padua Chapel	Banga 1st
San Roque Chapel	Tabang Bungad
Santa Ines Chapel	Sta. Ines Proper
Santa Ines Chapel	Sta. Ines Bukid
Santa Krus Chapel	Lalangan
Sto. Niño Chapel	Sto. Niño
San Roque Chapel	Sitio Balante
San Isidro Chapel	Agnaya
Banal na Krus (Santa Krus) Chapel	Lumangbayan

== Mandated organizations ==
- Commission on Liturgy
  - Lay Eucharistic Ministers
  - Parish Music Ministry
  - Apostolado ng Panalangin
  - Lector/ Commentator
  - Ministry of Altar Servers
  - Legion of Mary
  - Ostiarates (Mass Collectors/Usherettes)
  - Mother Butler Mission Guild
  - Cofradia delos Camareros de Quingua
  - Cofradia dela Virgen Consolacion Y Correa (The oldest Organization in the Parish)
  - Confraternity of Saint James the Great - Quingua
  - Angels of the Altars
- Commission on Family and Life
  - Marriage Encounter Community
  - Tipanan Community
- Commission on Social Action:
  - Knights of Columbus 6613
  - Catholic Women's' League
- Commission on Evangelization:
  - El Shaddai Prayer Community
  - Soldiers of Christ
  - Holy Family Family Prayer Community
  - Bible Apostolate
  - PAndiyosesis na Sentro ng Katekista (PASKA)
- Commission on Youth
- Commission on Social Communication
- Commission on Temporal Goods
- Commission on Basic Ecclesial Community

== Parish priests (Order of Saint Augustine) ==
- Rdo. P. Diego Vasquez
- Rdo. P. Diego Pardo
- Rdo. P. Luiz Gutierrez
- Rdo. P. Luiz Ruiz Brito
- Rdo. P. Geronimo Medrano
- Rdo. P. Luiz Gutierrez
- Rdo. P. Bartolome Alcantara
- Rdo. P. Bernabe de Leon
- Rdo. P. Antonio Mojica
- Rdo. P. Bernabe de Leon
- Rdo. P. Alonso Sandoval
- Rdo. P. Baltazar Herrera
- Rdo. P. Antonio Mojica
- Rdo. P. Tomas Velasco
- Rdo. P. Antonio Mojica
- Rdo. P. Baltazar Herrera
- Rdo. P. Alonso Coronel
- Rdo. P. Francisco Castillo
- Rdo. P. Antonio Carrion
- Rdo. P. Gaspar Serrano Padilla
- Rdo. P. Luis Herrera
- Rdo. P. Diego Gutierrez dela Fuente
- Rdo. P. Cristobal Marroquin
- Rdo. P. Pedro Cañales
- Rdo. P. Carlos Bautista
- Rdo. P. Ildefonso de Escos
- Rdo. P. Felipe Jaurigue
- Rdo. P. Juan de Peralta
- Rdo. P. Jose de Medina
- Rdo. P. Felix Bejar
- Rdo. P. Jose Zalduendo
- Rdo. P. Carlos Elloriaga
- Rdo. P. Jose Serrano
- Rdo. P. Carlos Elloriaga
- Rdo. P. Gaspar Garcia Sossa
- Rdo. P. Jose Nebot
- Rdo. P. Francisco Nuñez
- Rdo. P. Bernardo Iglesia
- Rdo. P. Tomas Quijano
- Rdo. P. Bernardo Iglesia
- Rdo. P. Miguel Vivas
- Rdo. P. Fernando Sanchez
- Rdo. P. Francisco Nuñez
- Rdo. P. Bernardo Sanchez
- Rdo. P. Francisco Bencuchillo
- Rdo. P. Juan Jaurigue
- Rdo. P. Manuel Zamora
- Rdo. P. Manuel Baceta
- Rdo. P. Manuel Cortazar
- Rdo. P. Francisco Cameselle
- Rdo. P. Manuel Baceta
- Rdo. P. Tomas Sanchez Parada
- Rdo. P. Jose de Leon
- Rdo. P. Domingo Beovide
- Rdo. P. Diego Perez
- Rdo. P. Bernardino Notario
- Rdo. P. Manuel Rivera
- Rdo. P. Juan Cuadrado
- Rdo. P. Dionisio de Sta. Maria
- Rdo. P. Santiago Villoria
- Rdo. P. Juan Crespo
- Rdo. P. Fulgencio Sainz
- Rdo. P. Juan Serrano
- Rdo. P. Manuel Cortazar
- Rdo. P. Servando De Bergantin
- Rdo. P. S.V. Utor
- Rdo. P. Florentino Monasterio
- Rdo. P. Angel Vesa
- Rdo. P. Pedro Ruiz
- Rdo. P. Emilio Mercado
- Rdo. P. Pedro Quiroz

== Parish priests (Filipino priests) ==
- Rdo. P. Victorino Lopez
- Rdo. P. Gabino Baluyot
- Rdo. P. Marcelino Fajardo
- Rdo. Mons. Honorio Resurreccion
- Rdo. P. Gonzalo Sarreal
- Rdo. P. Hermogenez Ersando
- Rdo. Mons. Serafin Riego de Dios
- Rdo. Mons. Roman O. Nocon
- Rdo. P. Anacleto C. Ignacio
- Rdo. P. Jose Dennis A. Espejo
- Rdo. P. Elmer R. Ignacio
- Rdo. P. Rufino L. Sulit

== Parochial vicar ==
- Rdo. P. Feliciano Palma
- Rdo. P. Luciano Paguiligan
- Rdo. P. Regalado San Pedro
- Rdo. P. Eliseo Carreon
- Rdo. P. Jose Aguilar Jr.
- Rdo. P. Rafael Balite Jr.
- Rdo. P. Gabriel Jocson
- Rdo. P. Jose Vengco
- Rdo. P. Eugenio Marcelo
- Rdo. P. Protacio Gunggon (Former Antipolo Bishop)
- Rdo. P.Generoso Santos
- Rdo. P. Bienvenido Lopez
- Rdo. P. Deogracias Iñiguez (Former Kalookan Bishop)
- Rdo. P. Nicomedes Del Rosario
- Rdo. P. Cesar Suarez
- Rdo. P. Romeo Dionisio
- Rdo. P. Javer Joaquin
- Rdo. P. Flormonico Cadiz
- Rdo. P. Nicanor Castro
- Rdo. P. Alejandro Enriquez
- Rdo. P. Reynaldo Rivera
- Rdo. P. Benito Justiniano
- Rdo. P. Joey Buencamino
- Rdo. P. Lamberto Tomas
- Rdo. P. Gregorio Dazo Jr.
- Rdo. P. Jun Espiritu
- Rdo. P. Joselito Rodriguez
- Rdo. P. Francis Cortez III
- Rdo. P. Leopoldo Evangelista
- Rdo. P. Vincent Reyes
- Rdo. P. Ramon Bernardo
- Rdo. P. Alvin Pila
- Rdo. P. Renato Brion Jr.
- Rdo. P. Daniel Sevilla
- Rdo. P. Edgardo Toribio Jr.
- Rdo. P. Romeo Sasi
- Rdo. P. Kirth Stephen Buluran
- Rdo. P. Samuel Estrope II
- Rdo. P. Jowel Karlo San Luis

== St. James' Salubong Festival ==
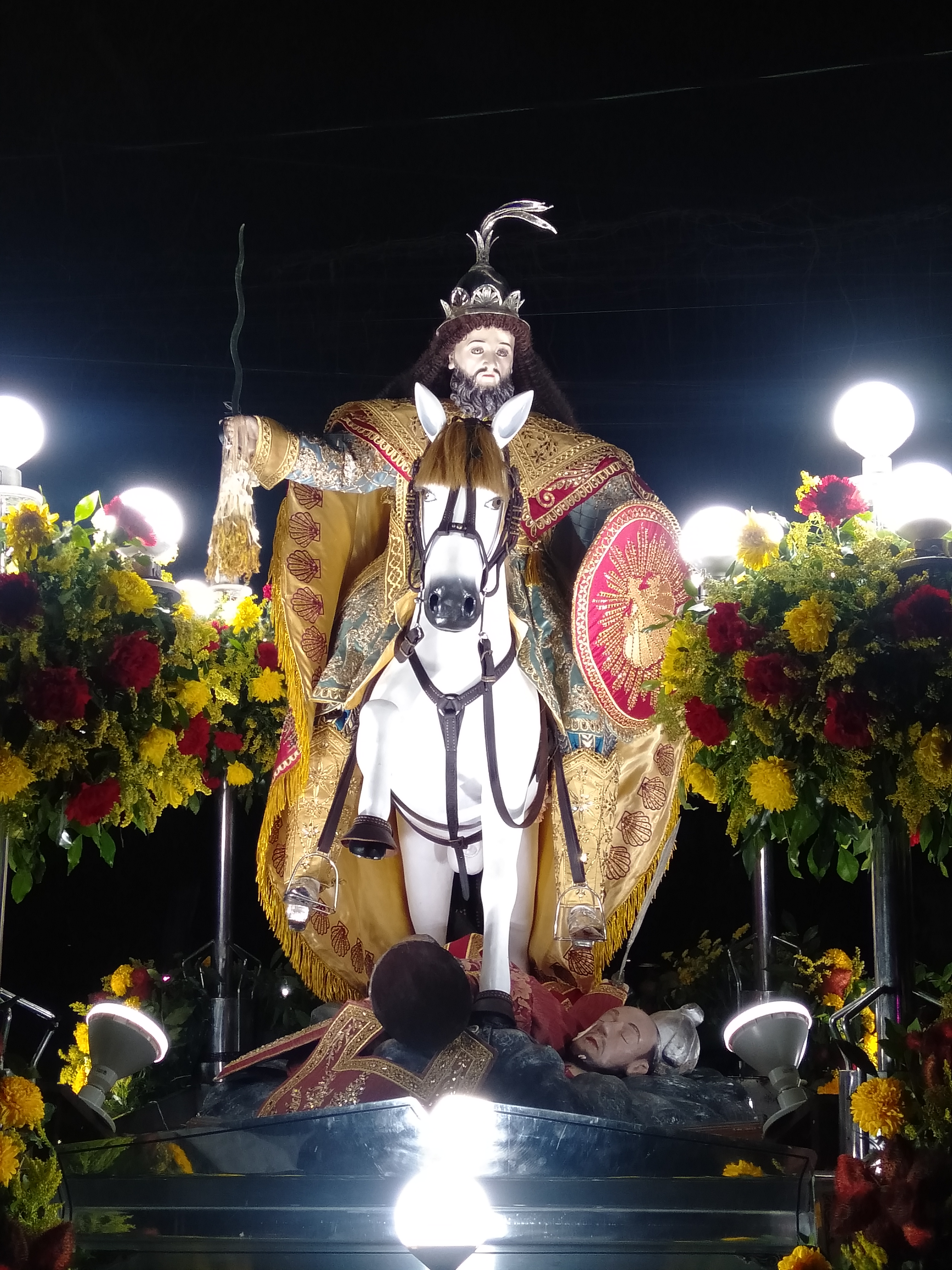
Saint James the Great is the patron saint of Quingua Church.

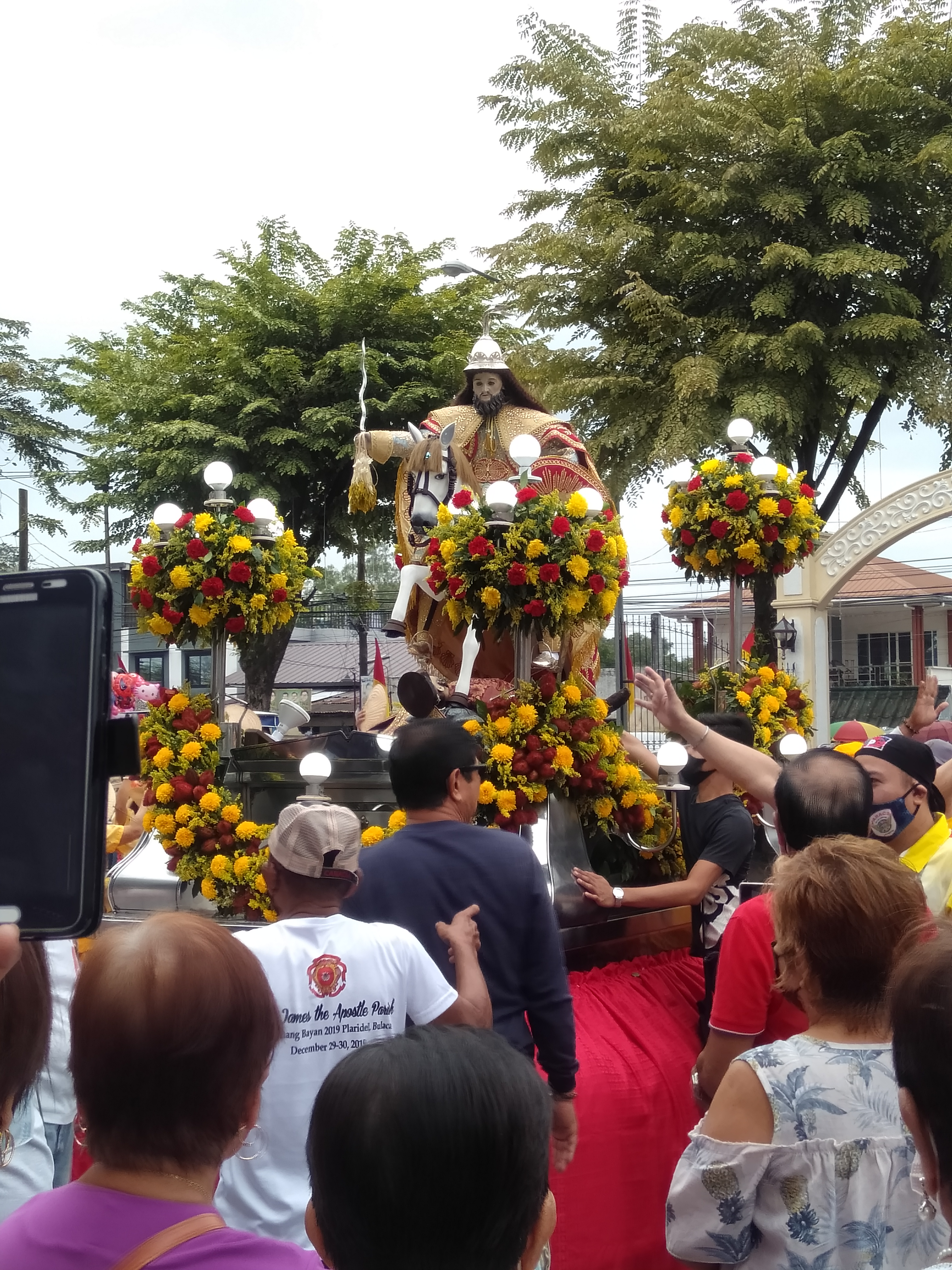
The image of Santiago Apostol upon arrival in Quingua Church

The two-day celebration called "Pintakasi ng mga Caballero" is held before New Year's Eve in Plaridel, Bulacan. Its main attraction, held on December 29, is a parade of cocheros and jockeys followed by a tilbury race (horse-drawn chariots for two).

This annual celebrations turned 400 years old last December. It is the traditional feast of San Tiago Mata Moros in Plaridel town.

Devotees and tourists flock to Plaridel each year either to witness or participate in this colorful ritual in honor of San Tiago, or St. James the Apostle, who has been depicted as a horse rider. San Tiago is considered the unofficial patron of cocheros and jockeys.

St. James the Apostle is the cousin of Christ. His image, portrayed riding on a white horse trampling upon pagan figures, is brought in a procession from its "home" in Barangay Sipat and transferred to the Parish Church.

Fiesta organizers dub the ritual preceded by an early morning mass on December 29 at the chapel of Barangay Sipat as, "the traditional salubong." Featured are race studs and the patient horses of caritelas and tilburies with their owners seeking blessing during the translacion or transfer of their patron saint.

The procession is called salubong because San Tiago's image tailed by groups of faithful including elderly women wearing kimona’t saya and buntal hats performing a ritual dance is met by the patron's other devotees halfway from Sipat to Plaridel Parish Church, in the town's poblacion.

Local officials and national figures often join the devotees’ seven-kilometer trek to the parish church. In the past celebration, Tourism Secretary Gemma Cruz Araneta; DOTC Sec. Vicente Rivera Jr., who hails from Plaridel; Former Bulacan Governor Josie Dela Cruz; and former Bulacan Vice Governor Willie Villarama, this town's "adopted son", led the procession.

The image stays inside the parish to give time for the faithful to pay their respects until the following day, December 30, when the image is again carried in a procession around the poblacion. After 14 days, when the fiesta celebration is over, the image, in another simple procession accompanied by fiesta organizers and town officials, will be returned to the Sipat Chapel, popularly known as Hatid.

"Salubong" ritual dates back to the time of Spanish friars who established the town's parish church in 1580, making St. James patron saint of the town. according to a local book of the town's history, the original image of St. James on a white horse brought to Plaridel (then Quingua) by the Spaniards in the 1800s was left in the care of the family of Bernardo Sampana a rebel heathen of Sepoy ancestry who became a Christian convert. The image was housed in their home at Barrio Tabang. Then the Sampanas were ordered by the friars to turn over the said image to the possession of the owners of the Bahay na Bato in Barrio Sipat (which was renamed Santiago), because of the townsfolks' claim that the family was allegedly practicing sorcery.

When the owners of Bahay na Bato died, the image became the possession of Tandang Sitang whose house was eventually turned into a barrio chapel, present home to San Tiago's image in Sipat.

San Tiago, or St. James the Apostle, was a Galilean and brother of St. John the Evangelist. He was ordered killed by Herod Agrippa, King of Judea in 41 A.D. A history book of Philip Van Ness says the tomb of St. James was found in Northern Spain in 718 A.D. Thirty years after that, a war between the Spaniards and the Moors broke out. When the Spaniards were in near defeat, an apparition of St. James, armed with a sword and riding a white horse, appeared "as bright as a star" in the thick of the battle.

The apparition gave life to the demoralized Spanish soldiers and led them to victory over the Moors, who in turn were bedazzled by the blinding image of St. James. This "miracle" probably explains why St. James became patron saint of those who have affinity with horses, like the devotees flocking every year to the colorful Plaridel ritual.

== Restoration of ceiling art ==
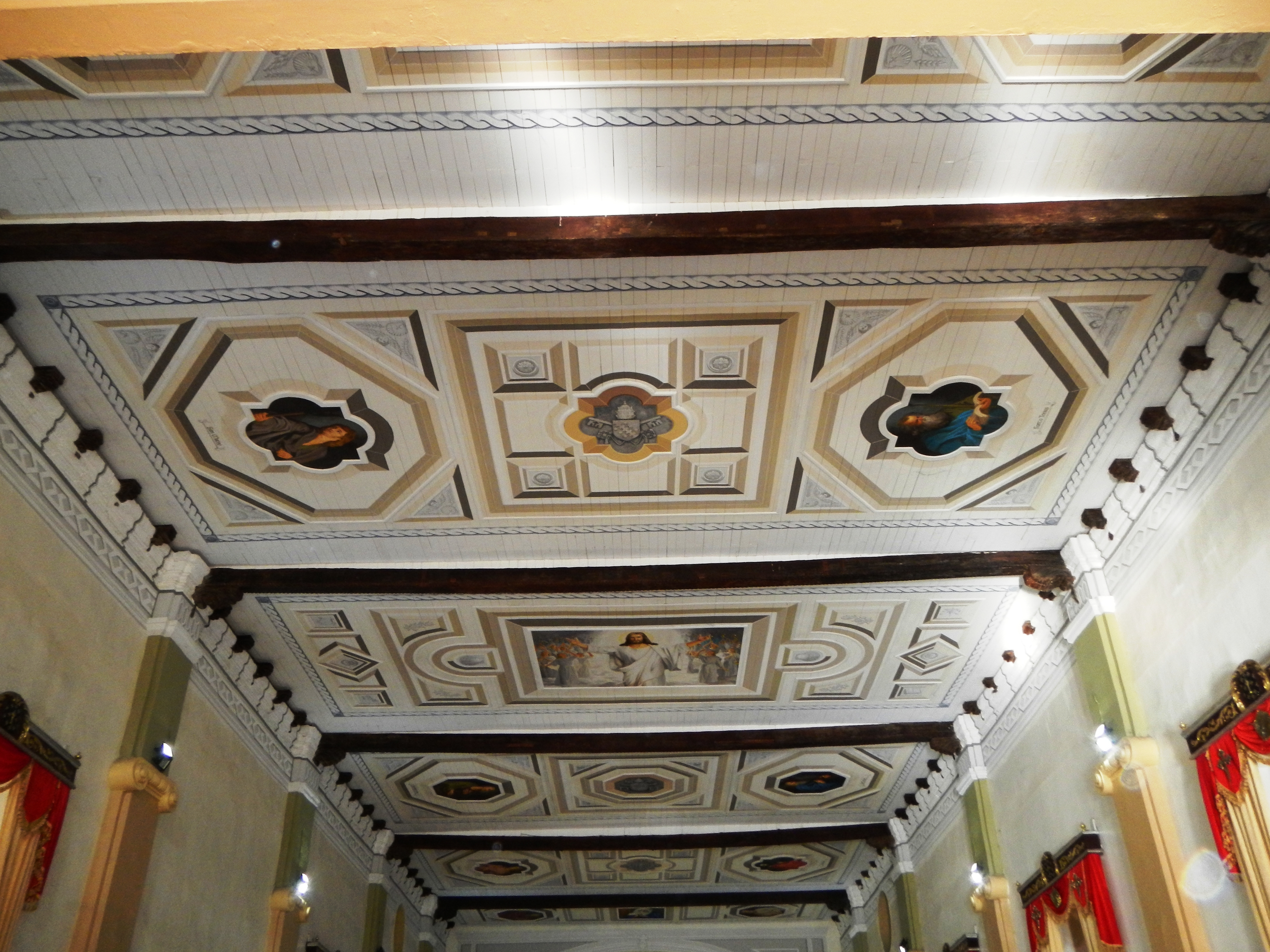
Church ceiling in 2014

Late in November 2013, efforts to restore parts of the Santiago Apostol Church, including its ceiling paintings were completed. The project's proponent was the parish church management under the leadership of Fr. Dennis Espejo in cooperation with the AADG Restoration Group. According to project director Andrew Alto de Guzman, the task was aimed at promoting the appreciation of Quingua's heritage. The project, which took two years to complete involved three stages. The first stage, after extensive research on the structure, was uncovering the church trusses, the tirantes or decorative beams, and the zapata or corbels which supported the original ceiling, all of which were covered in the 1970s when tin sheets and wood were used as the church ceiling. The second stage was remaking the trompe-l'œil paintings in the ceiling based on archival photos. Among the images illustrated were those of Christ, Mary, and the twelve apostles. The artworks were done by local artists Chris Pasco, Mark Villanueva, Roy Gutierrez, Joey de Guzman and assistants. The third phase of the project centered on applying lime plaster to the upper portions of the capitals. The application of palitada was provided by Escuela Taller. The bricked up rose windows on the sides of the church were also exposed.
