= Tarlac Cathedral =

Latin Catholic cathedral in Tarlac, Philippines

- San Sebastian Cathedral Parish
- Catedral de San Sebastián de Tarlac (Spanish)
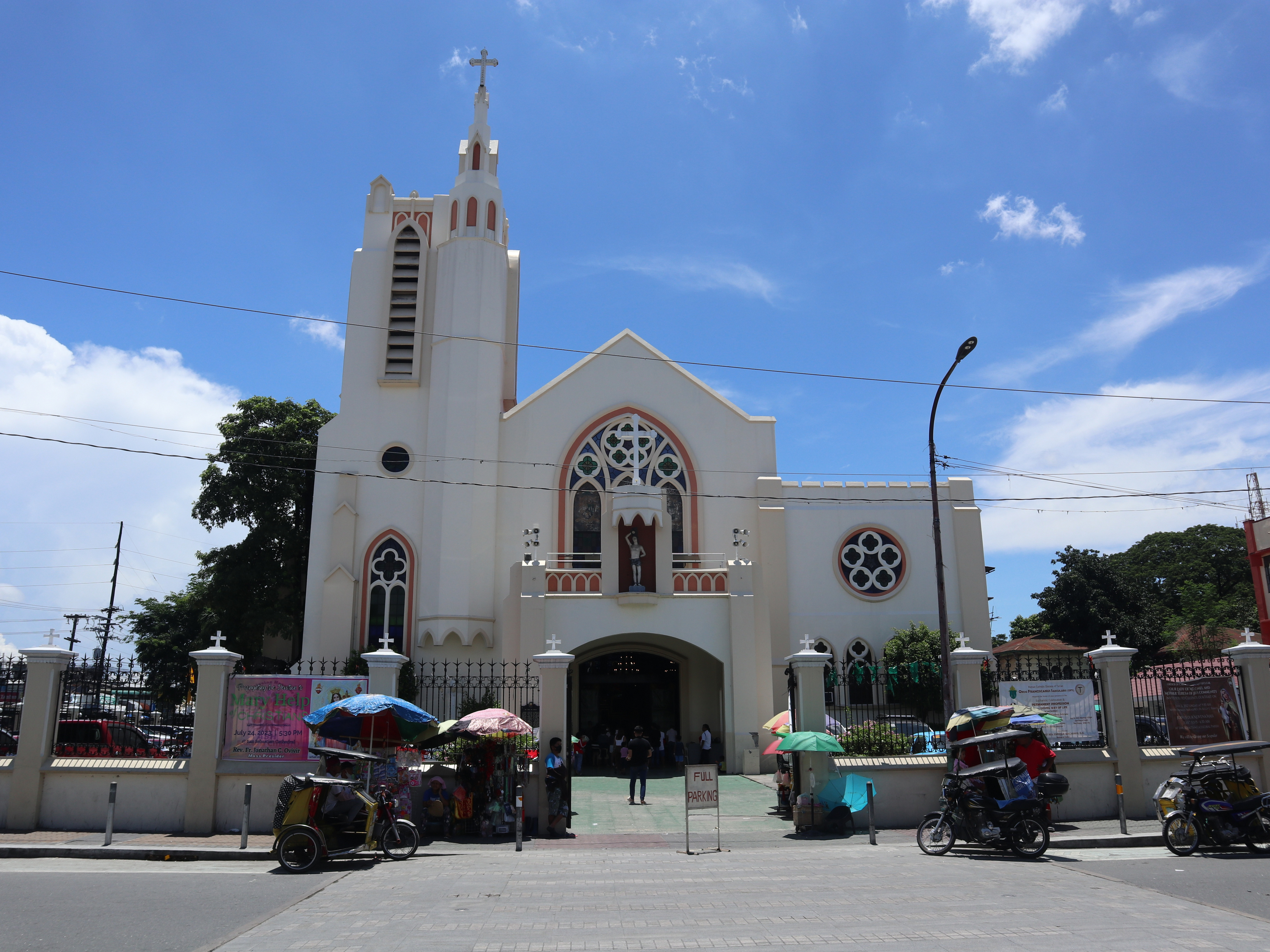
- Cathedral facade in 2023

- Location in Luzon Location in the Philippines
- 15°29′16″N 120°35′17″E
- Location: Tarlac
- Country: Philippines
- Denomination: Latin Catholic

History
- Status: Cathedral
- Founded: 1686
- Dedication: Saint Sebastian

Architecture
- Functional status: Active
- Architectural type: Church building
- Style: Neo-Gothic
- Completed: Post-1945

Specifications
- Materials: Gravel, cement, steel, concrete

Administration
- Province: San Fernando
- Metropolis: San Fernando
- Archdiocese: San Fernando
- Diocese: Tarlac

Clergy
- Bishop: Roberto Calara Mallari

San Sebastian Cathedral Parish, commonly known as Tarlac Cathedral, is a post-war, Neo-Gothic Latin Catholic church located in Brgy. Mabini, Tarlac City, Philippines. The cathedral, which was dedicated to Saint Sebastian in 1686, is the seat of the Diocese of Tarlac. A historical marker of the National Historical Commission of the Philippines was unveiled near the cathedral's entrance on July 15, 2022.

== Parish history ==
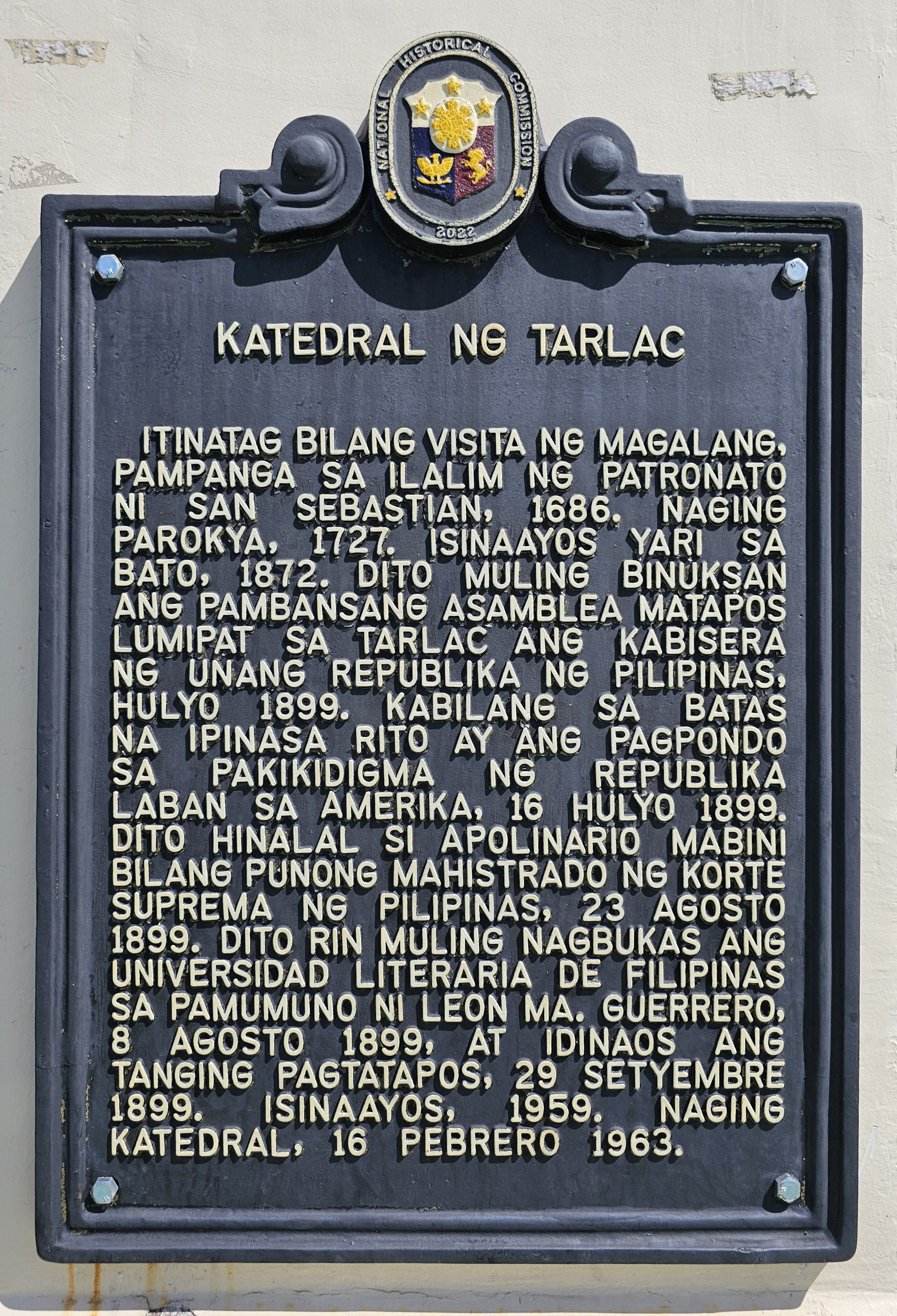
Church NHC historical marker installed in 2022

The town of Tarlac was said to have been established in 1686 by priests assigned to Magalang, Pampanga. The town was managed by the Augustinians from Pampanga until in 1725, a petition was brought to the attention of the Father Provincial to separate Tarlac from its distant matrix. In 1727, the separation was fulfilled with Tarlac being declared an independent parish. In 1757, however, the parish of Tarlac was annexed back to Magalang for some time.

== Architectural history ==
The first known parochial building of Tarlac is attributed to Father Agustín Barriocanal in 1740.

Later in 1872, a wood and stone church was erected by Father Baltasar Gamarra. Construction lasted until 1875 under Father Tomás Fito, and was completed by Father Fermín Sardón in 1890. The finished church was said to have been identical to the church of Concepcion.

This structure was completely destroyed in 1945 during the Second World War and was later rebuilt in its current style.

== Gallery ==
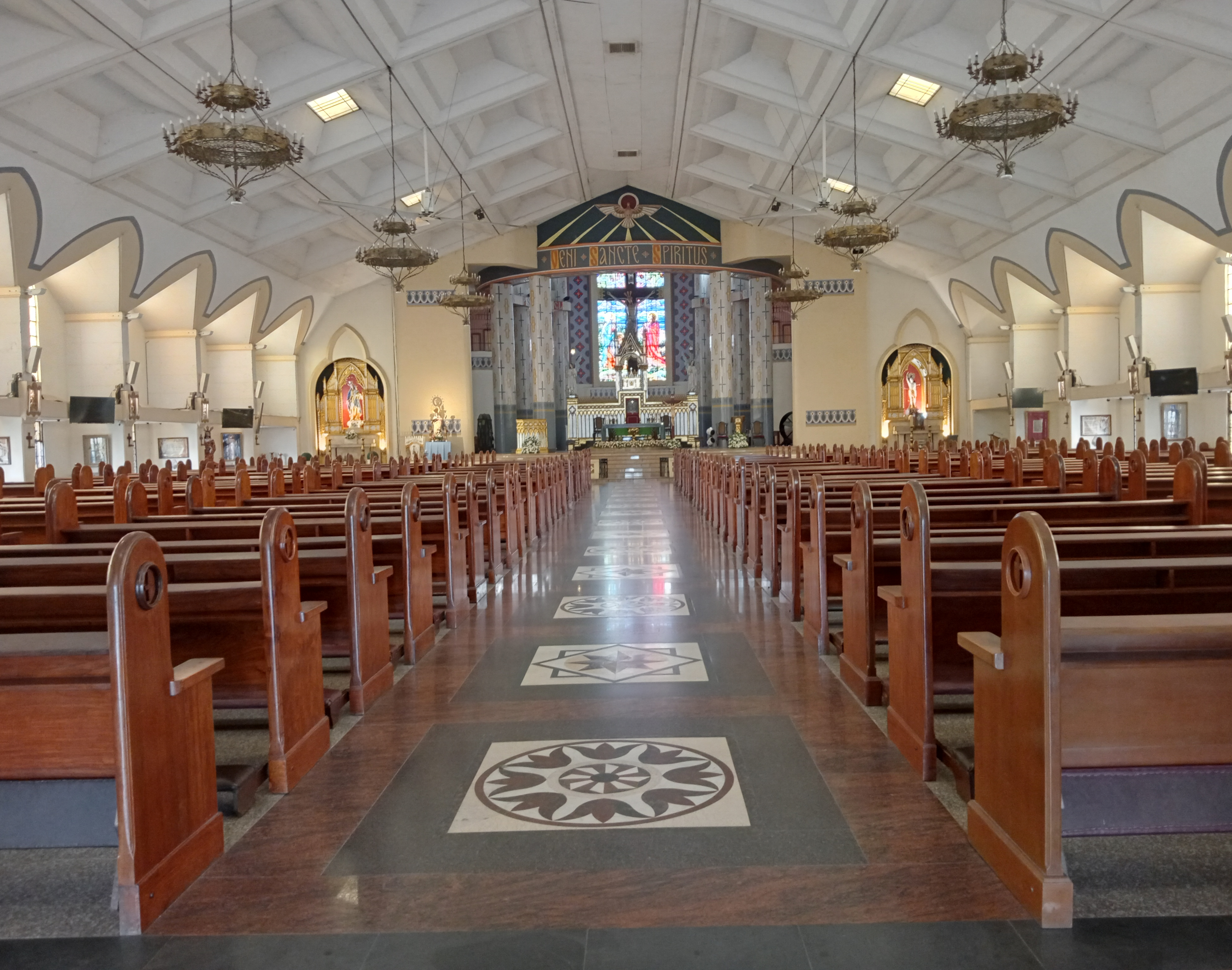
Cathedral interior in 2024

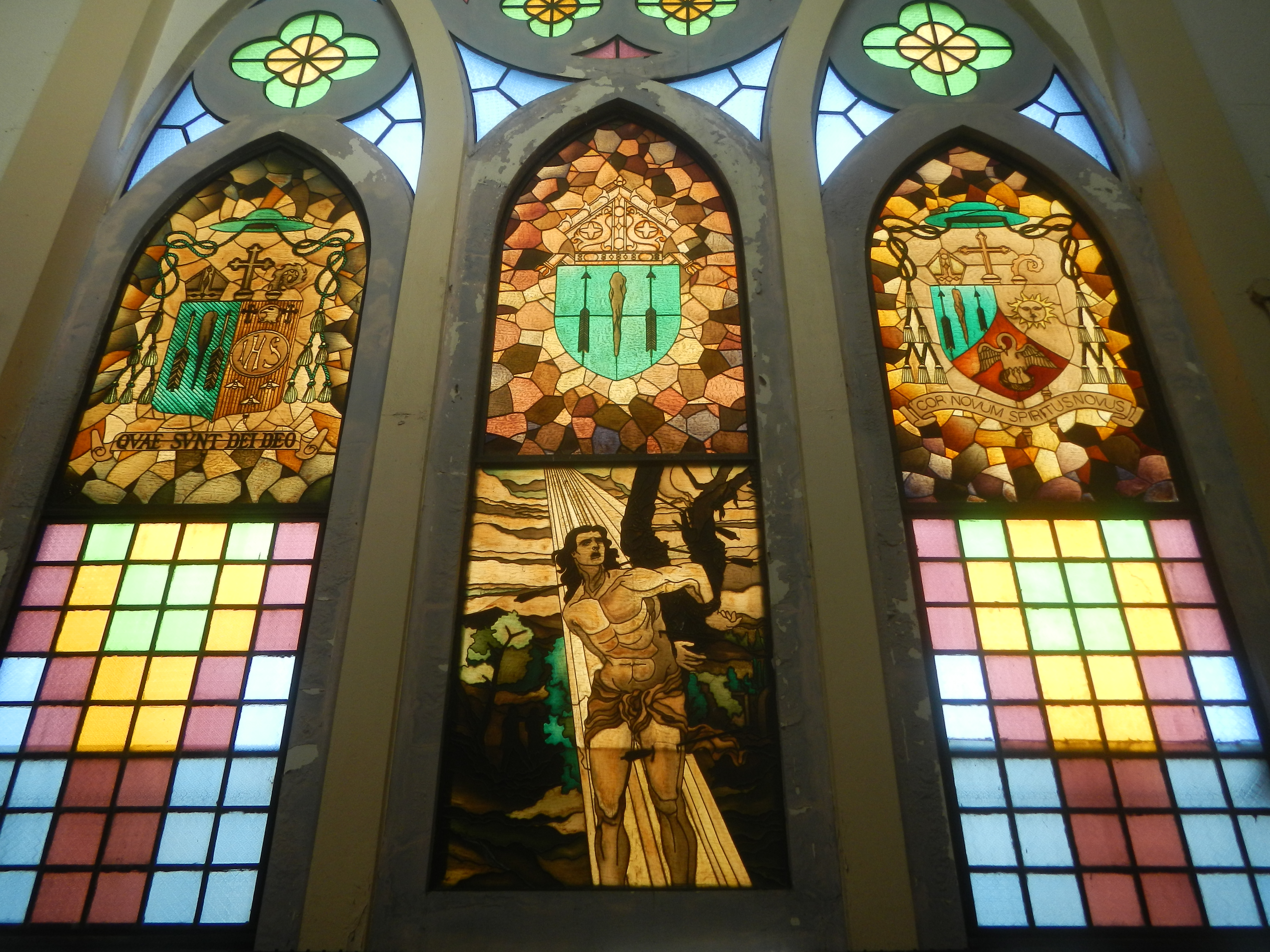
Stained glass window featuring Saint Sebastian

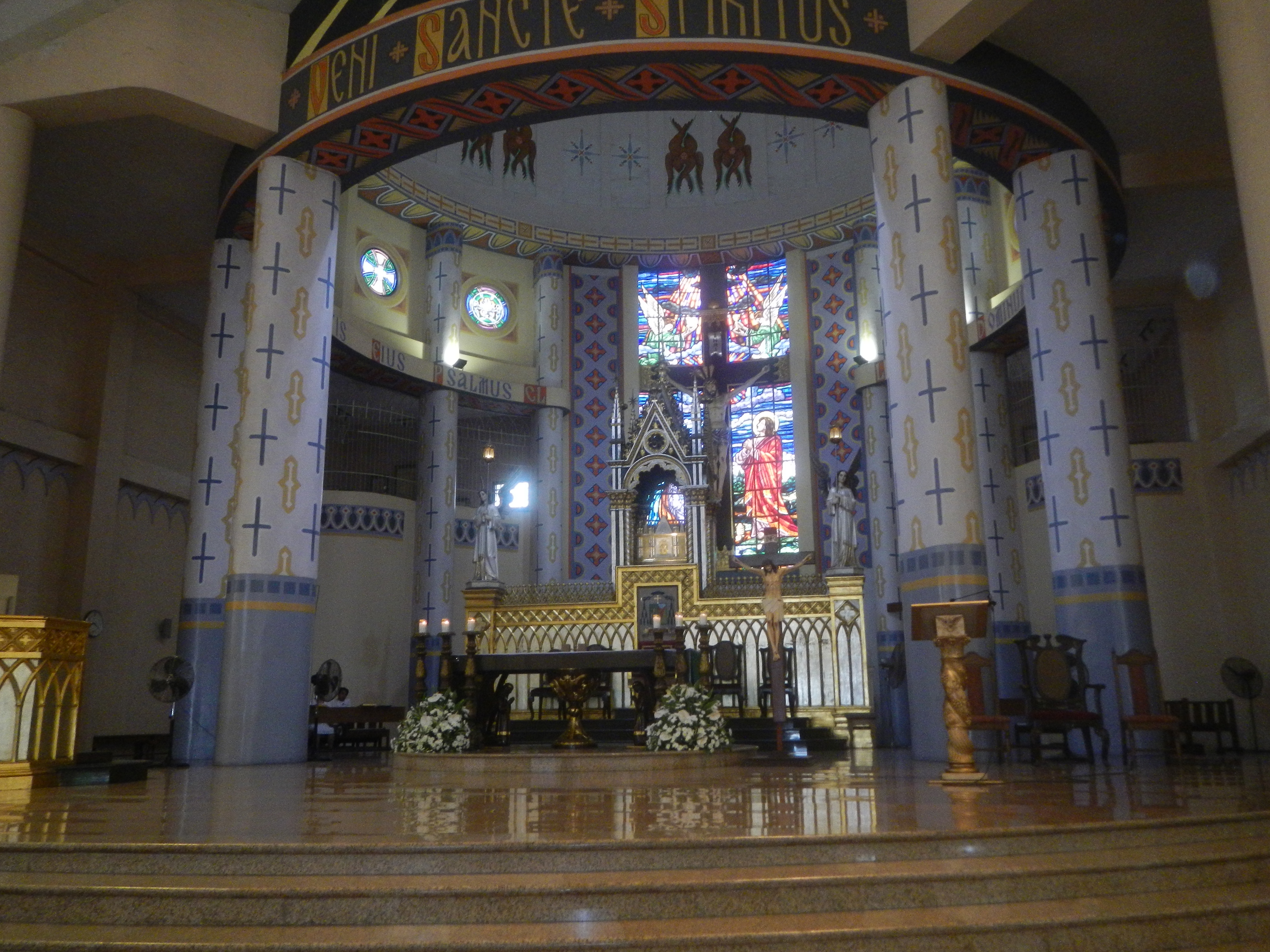
Church sanctuary

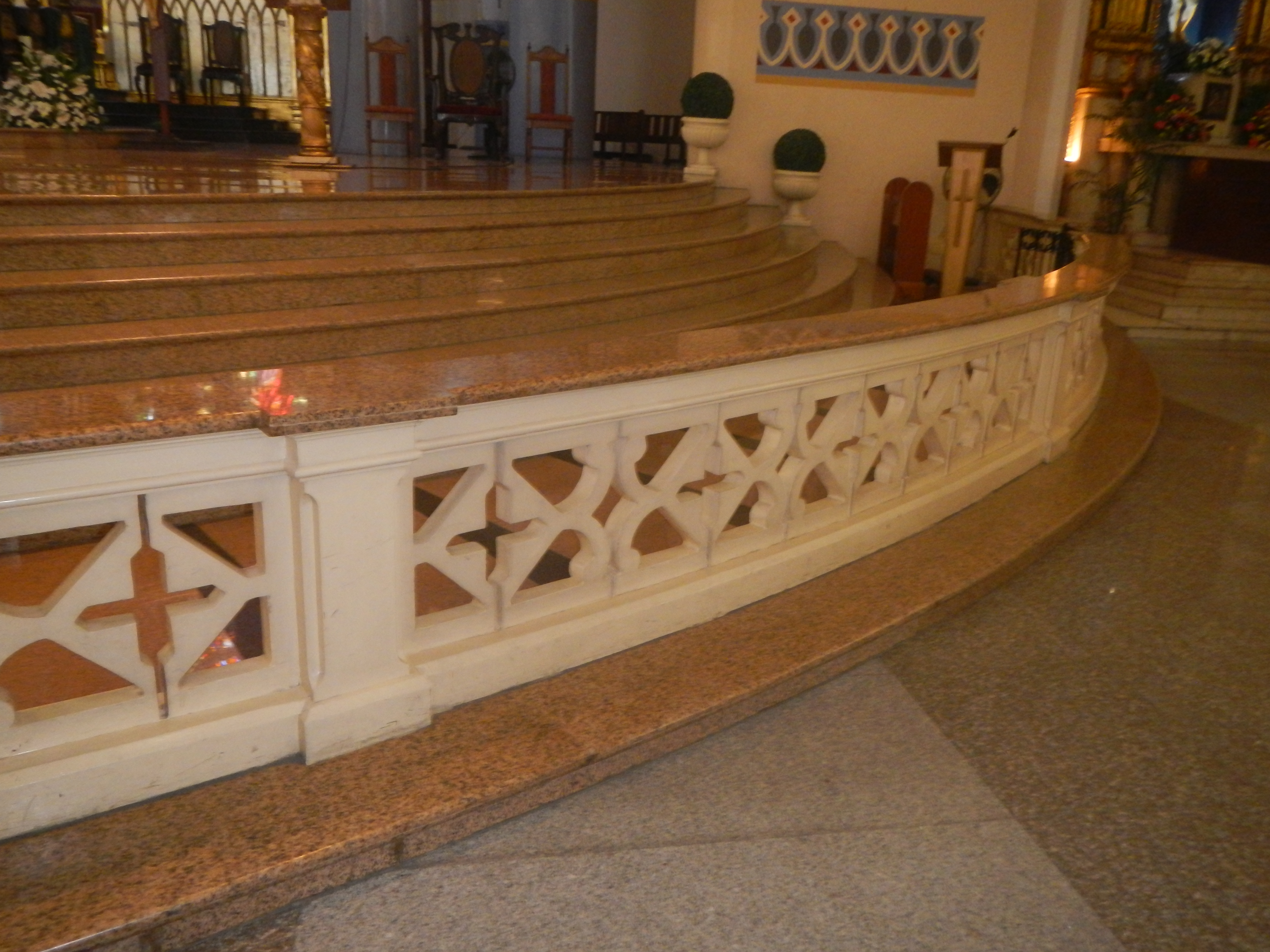
Altar rails

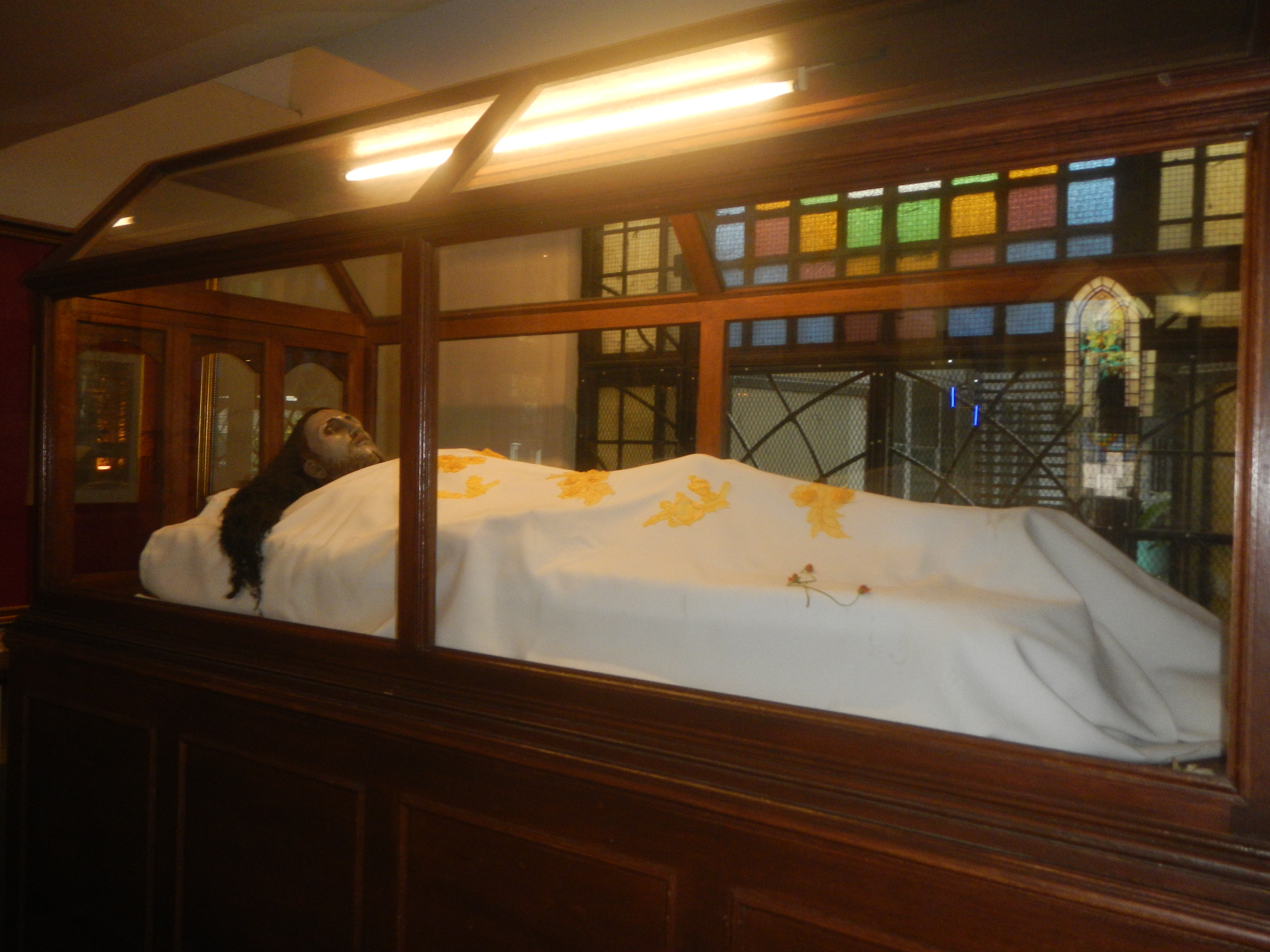
Santo Entierro
