= Diocese of San Jose (Nueva Ecija) =

Latin Catholic diocese in the Philippines

Diocese of San Jose, Nueva Ecija Dioecesis Sancti Iosephi in Insulis Philippinis Diyosesis ng San Jose, Nueva Ecija Diocesis ti San Jose, Nueva Ecija

Catholic
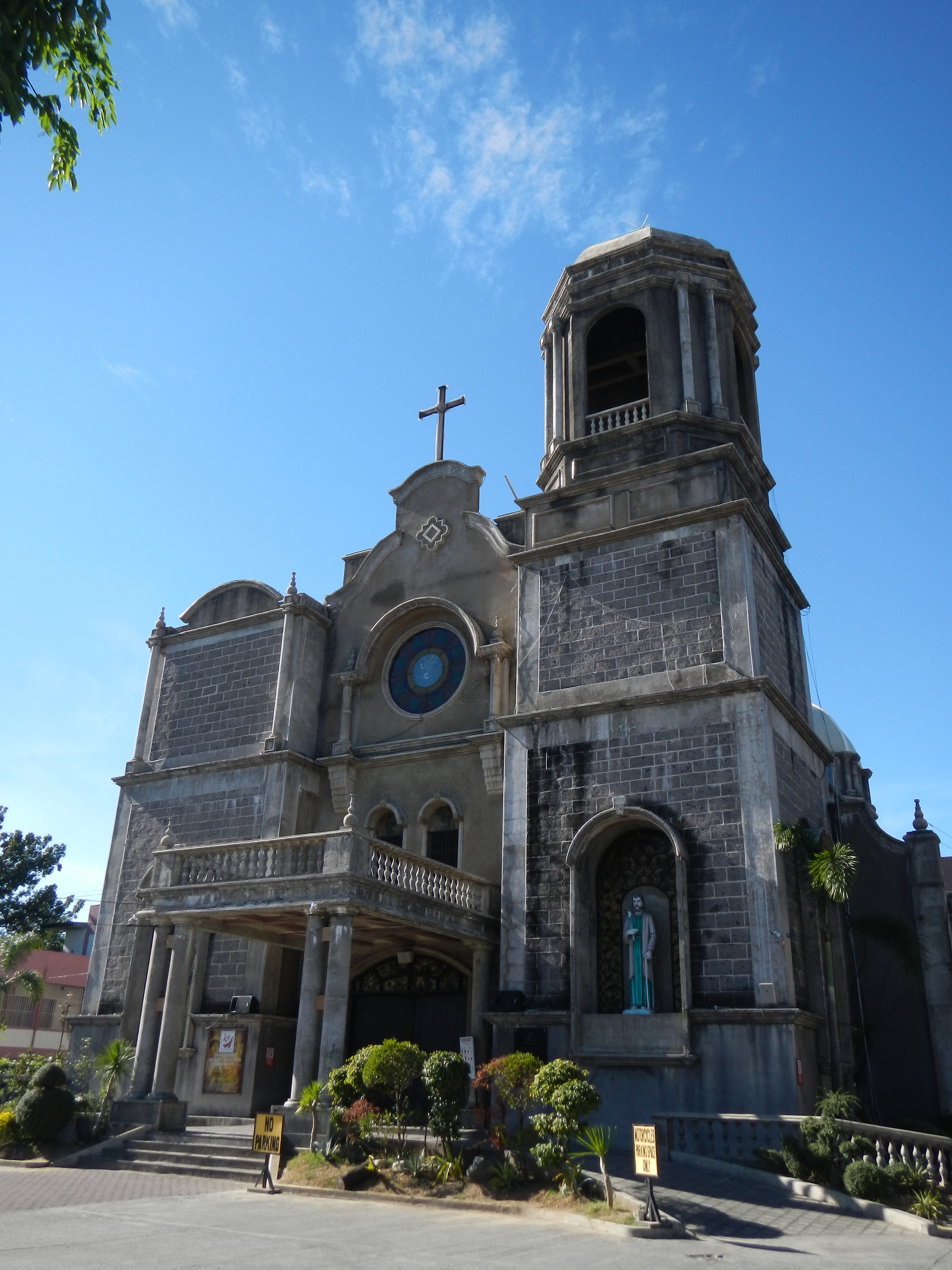
- San Jose Cathedral, Nueva Ecija

- Coat of arms

Location
- Country: Philippines
- Territory: Northern Nueva Ecija (Carranglan, Cuyapo, Guimba, Licab, Llanera, Lupao, Muñoz, Nampicuan, Pantabangan, Quezon, Rizal, San Jose, Santo Domingo, Talugtug)
- Ecclesiastical province: Lingayen–Dagupan
- Metropolitan: Lingayen–Dagupan
- Coordinates: 15°47′31″N 120°59′23″E

Statistics
- Area: 2,540 km^{2} (980 sq mi)
- Population: Total; Catholics: (as of 2021); 975,000; 860,000 (88.2%)
- Parishes: 21
- Congregations: 10 (4 religious institutes of men and 6 religious institutes of women)
- Schools: 12 (10 diocesan schools and 2 religious administered)

Information
- Denomination: Catholic Church
- Sui iuris church: Latin Church
- Rite: Roman Rite
- Established: February 16, 1984; 42 years ago
- Cathedral: Cathedral-Parish of St. Joseph the Worker
- Patron saint: Joseph the Worker
- Secular priests: 41

Current leadership
- Pope: Leo XIV
- Bishop: Samuel Naceno Agcaracar, S.V.D.
- Metropolitan Archbishop: Socrates Buenaventura Villegas
- Vicar General: Rev. Fr. Getty A. Ferrer, JCD

The Diocese of San Jose, Nueva Ecija (Latin: Dioecesis Sancti Iosephi in Insulis Philippinis) is a Latin Church ecclesiastical territory or diocese located in the province of Nueva Ecija, Philippines. Established by Pope John Paul II in 1984, it was officially canonically erected on July 14 of the same year. The diocese was created from the territories formerly under the Diocese of Cabanatuan, initially comprising sixteen parishes out of Cabanatuan's original forty-one. It is a suffragan of the Archdiocese of Lingayen–Dagupan.

The diocese celebrated its silver anniversary of canonical erection on July 14, 2009. San Jose held its first diocesan synod in March 2011, led by the Apostolic Nuncio to the Philippines.

== History ==
The Diocese of San Jose, located in Nueva Ecija, Philippines, was established by Pope John Paul II on February 16, 1984 by virtue of the papal bull Saepe Catholicorum Utilitas. The diocese consists of territories taken from the Diocese of Cabanatuan. Sixteen out of the forty-one parishes formerly belonging to the Diocese of Cabanatuan were incorporated into the Diocese of San Jose, Nueva Ecija. Approximately 80 percent of the population within the diocese identify as Roman Catholic, while the remaining 20 percent belong to various other religious groups and denominations. The seat of the diocese is the Saint Joseph the Worker Cathedral.

Bishop Florentino F. Cinense was appointed as San Jose's first bishop on May 24, 1984. The canonical erection of the diocese, as well as the ordination and installation of Cinense as its first bishop all occurred on July 14, 1984, during a Mass presided by Bruno Torpigliani, then papal nuncio to the Philippines, who acted as Cinense's, principal consecrator with Federico Limon and Ciceron Tumbocon as co-consecrators.

On August 17, 1985, Cinense was appointed coadjutor bishop of Tarlac but continued to serve as the apostolic administrator of San Jose until his successor, Bishop Leo M. Drona, was appointed on June 10, 1987, and consecrated on July 25, 1987.

Bishop Leo M. Drona had been a Salesian of Don Bosco for twenty nine-years prior to his episcopal appointment. He is the first Filipino Salesian priest as well as the first Filipino Salesian bishop. In June 2004, Drona was transferred to the Diocese of San Pablo, Laguna as its third bishop.

He was succeeded by Bishop Mylo Hubert C. Vergara, who was appointed by Pope John Paul II on February 12, 2005 and was installed as the third bishop of the Diocese of San Jose de Nueva Ecija on May 14, 2005. Vergara was subsequently transferred to the Diocese of Pasig in 2011.

On May 15, 2012, Pope Benedict XVI named Roberto C. Mallari as the diocese's fourth bishop; he was installed on July 10 of that year.

On December 29, 2024, Pope Francis transferred Bishop Mallari to the Diocese of Tarlac. Following Mallari's installation in Tarlac on March 27, 2025, Fr. Getty Ferrer was elected as its diocesan administrator on March 29, 2025.

On November 21, 2025, Pope Leo XIV appointed Rev. Fr. Samuel Agcaracar, SVD, Rector of the Divine Word Seminary and Founder of the SVD Laudato Si Farm in Tagaytay as its fifth bishop.

== Ordinaries ==
No.	Bishop	Period in office	Notes	Coat of arms
1	Florentino Ferrer Cinense	July 14, 1984 – August 17, 1985 (1 year, 34 days)	Appointed coadjutor bishop of Tarlac	
2	Leo Murphy Drona	August 15, 1987 – May 14, 2004 (16 years, 273 days)	Appointed bishop of San Pablo	
3	Mylo Hubert Claudio Vergara	May 14, 2005 – April 20, 2011 (5 years, 341 days)	Appointed bishop of Pasig	
4	Roberto Calara Mallari	July 10, 2012 – December 29, 2024 (12 years, 172 days)	Appointed bishop of Tarlac	
5	Samuel Naceno Agcaracar, S.V.D.	February 6, 2026 – present (172 days)		

== Diocesan officials ==
- Vicar general: Getty A. Ferrer
- Chancellor: Rufo Ramil H. Cruz, OP. , Ph.D.
- Vice chancellor: Vic Kevin O. Ferrer
- Oeconomous: Nestor E. Romano
- Judicial vicar: Getty A. Ferrer

== Apo Jose Catholic Educational System (ACES) ==
=== Diocesan schools ===
- Our Lady of the Sacred Heart College, Guimba
- St. Joseph School, San Jose City
- St. Pius X Institute, Cuyapo
- St. Pius X Institute of Nampicuan, Nampicuan
- Sacred Heart Academy, Lupao
- St. Andrew School, Pantabangan
- Holy Family Academy of Quezon, Nueva Ecija, Inc., Quezon
- Dominican High School, Santo Domingo
- Liceo de Christ the King, Talugtug
- St. Nicholas Academy, Carranglan

=== Religious administered ===
- San Sebastian School, Muñoz

=== Other educational centers ===
- Don Bosco Training Center, Malasin, San Jose City

== See also ==
- Catholic Church in the Philippines
- List of Catholic dioceses in the Philippines
- Roman Catholic Diocese of Cabanatuan
