= Saint Joseph Cathedral (Nueva Ecija) =

Roman Catholic church in Nueva Ecija, Philippines

- Saint Joseph the Worker Cathedral
- Parokyang Katedral ni San Jose Manggagawa (Filipino); Catedral Parroquia de San José Obrero (Spanish)
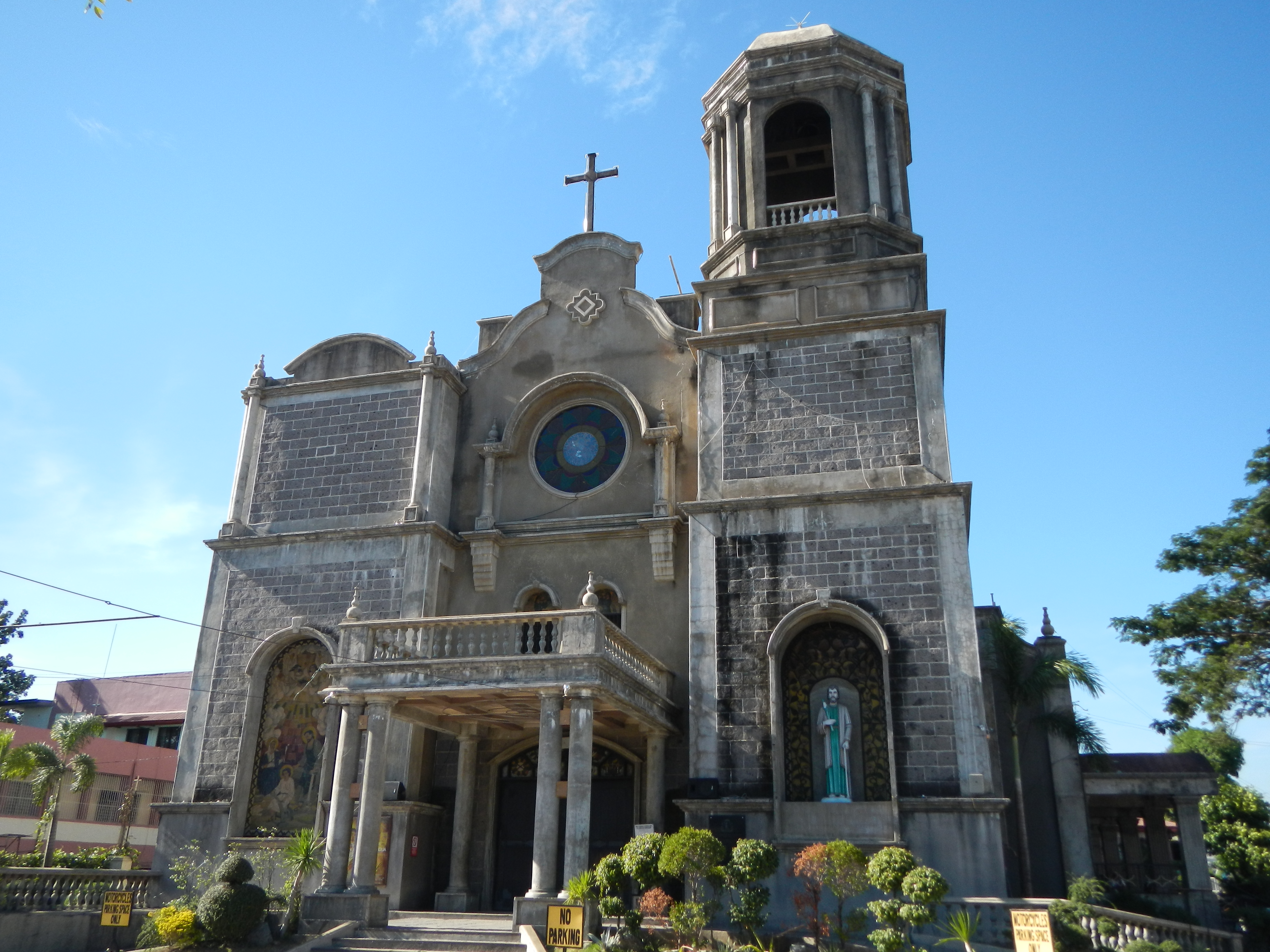
- Cathedral facade in 2013

- Location in Nueva Ecija Location in Luzon Location in the Philippines
- 15°47′32″N 120°59′22″E
- Location: San Jose, Nueva Ecija
- Country: Philippines
- Denomination: Roman Catholic

History
- Status: Cathedral
- Founded: 1910
- Dedication: Saint Joseph the Worker
- Consecrated: 1984, 2006

Architecture
- Functional status: Active
- Architectural type: Church building
- Style: Baroque Revival

Administration
- Archdiocese: Lingayen–Dagupan
- Diocese: San Jose, Nueva Ecija

Clergy
- Bishop(s): Samuel Naceno Agcaracar, S.V.D.
- Priest(s): Rev. Fr. Getty A. Ferrer, J.C.D.

Saint Joseph the Worker Cathedral, commonly known as Saint Joseph Cathedral, is a Roman Catholic cathedral located at Barangay Rafael Rueda, Sr. Poblacion in the city of San Jose, Nueva Ecija, Philippines. It is the seat of the Diocese of San Jose, Nueva Ecija and is dedicated to Saint Joseph the Worker.

== History ==
The first missionaries in what is now the province of Nueva Ecija were the Augustinians who also founded the parishes of Carranglan, Pantabangan and Puncan, of which San Jose was initially part of. San Jose was originally known as Kabaritan which is an Ilocano term for a "place abundant of barit", a type of rattan plant. It was a barrio of Puncan and then of Lupao, before becoming an independent town in 1894, and was renamed San Jose in honor of its patron saint, Joseph.

Until 1928, San Jose was under the jurisdiction of the Diocese of Nueva Segovia before becoming part of the Diocese of Lingayen, later Lingayen–Dagupan, which was established in the same year. Under Lingayen–Dagupan, the church was administered by the Missionaries of the Sacred Heart after World War II. San Jose was then annexed to the Diocese of Cabanatuan when the diocese, then comprising the entire province of Nueva Ecija, was founded in 1963. In 1984, the church became the cathedral of the Diocese of San Jose whose territory comprises the northern half of the province.

In 1997, the remodeling of the old cathedral church was started under then San Jose Bishop Leo Drona. It was finished in 2006 and was reconsecrated by then Lingayen–Dagupan Archbishop Oscar Cruz on March 20 of the same year. The reredos or retablo of the cathedral are works of Kapampangan artist Willy Layug, who also worked on the cathedrals of Dagupan, Bacolod, and Urdaneta.

== Gallery ==
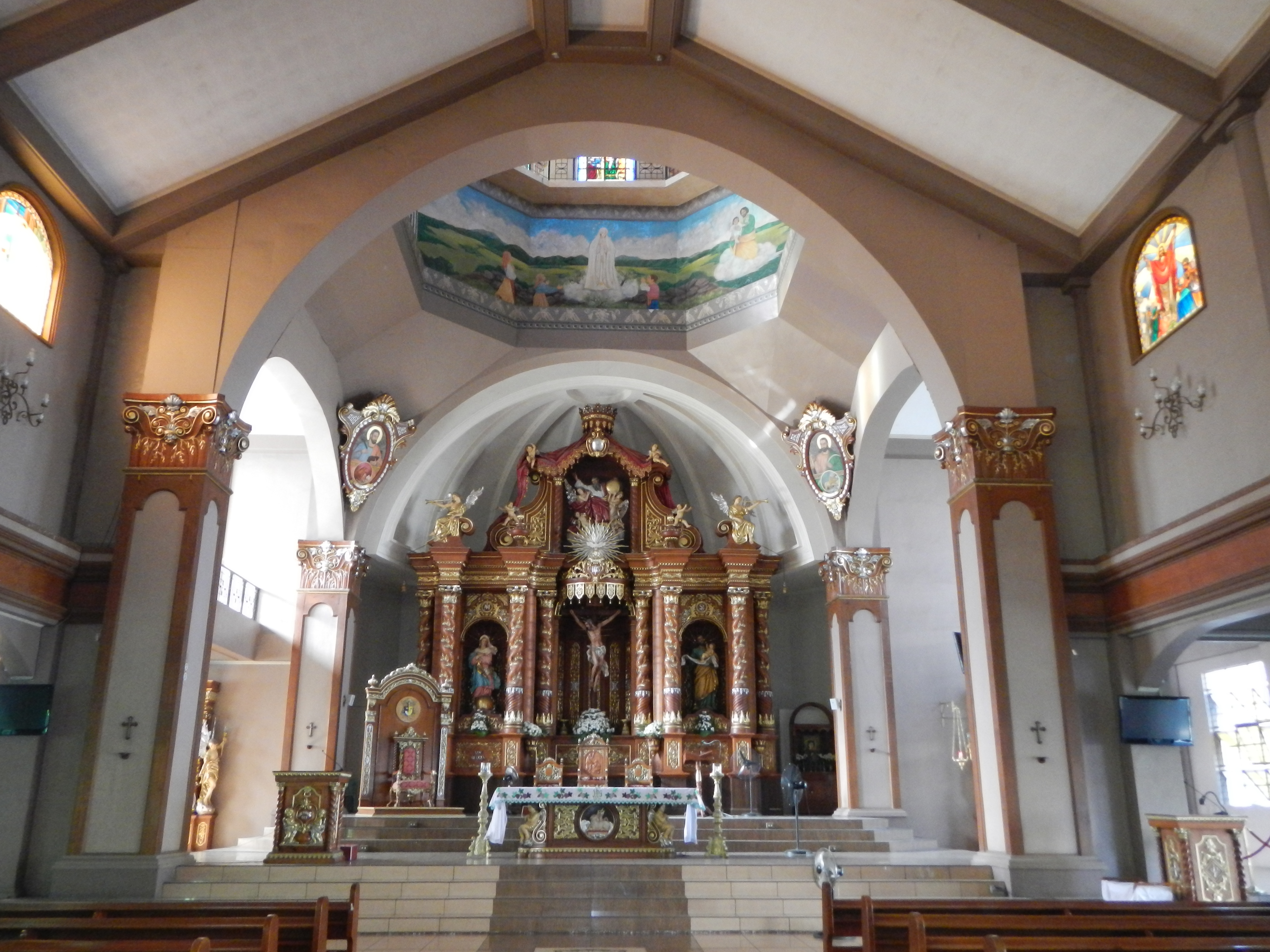
Reredos at the sanctuary

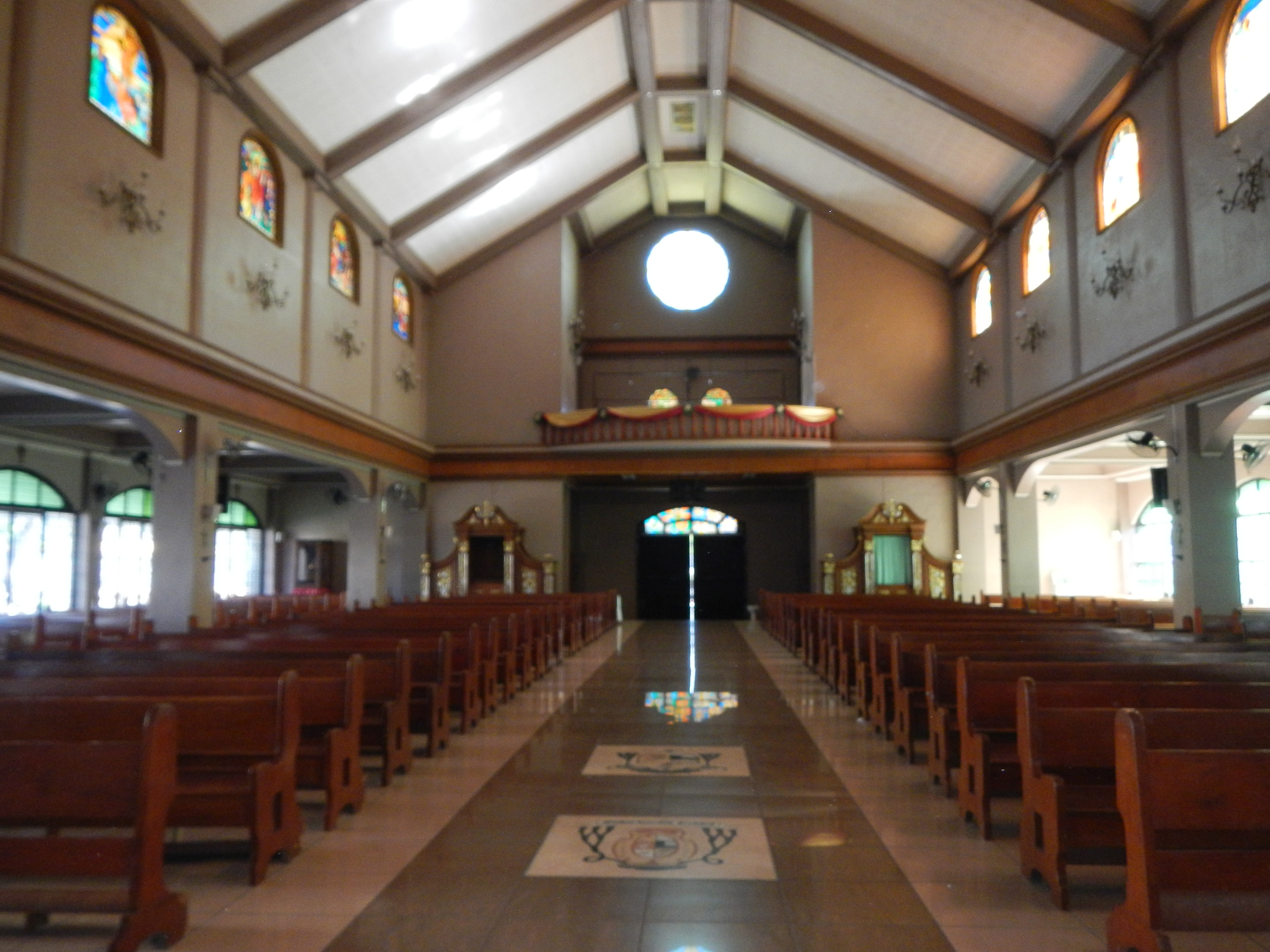
The view of the nave towards the narthex

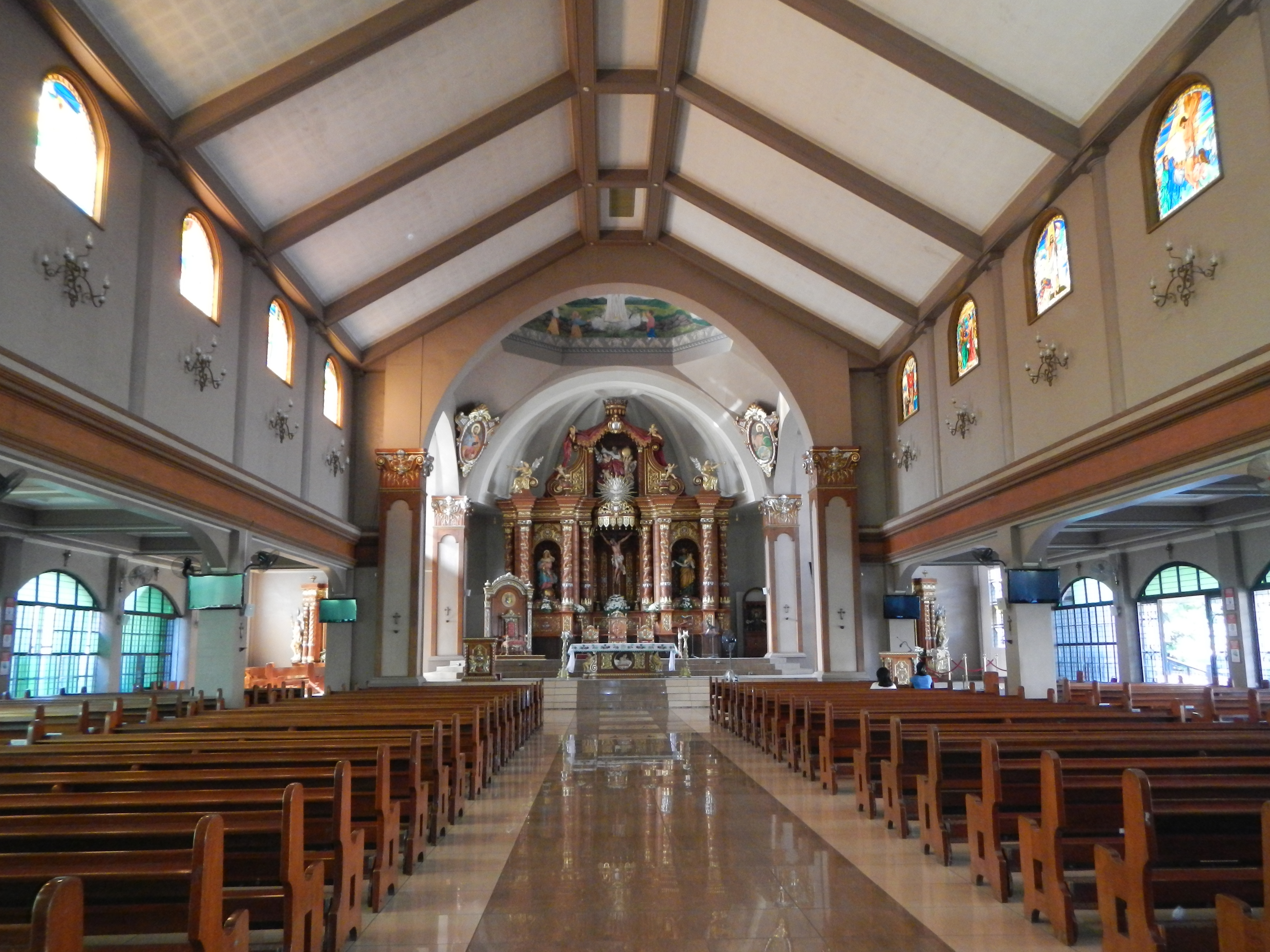
The view of the nave towards the sanctuary, taken in 2013

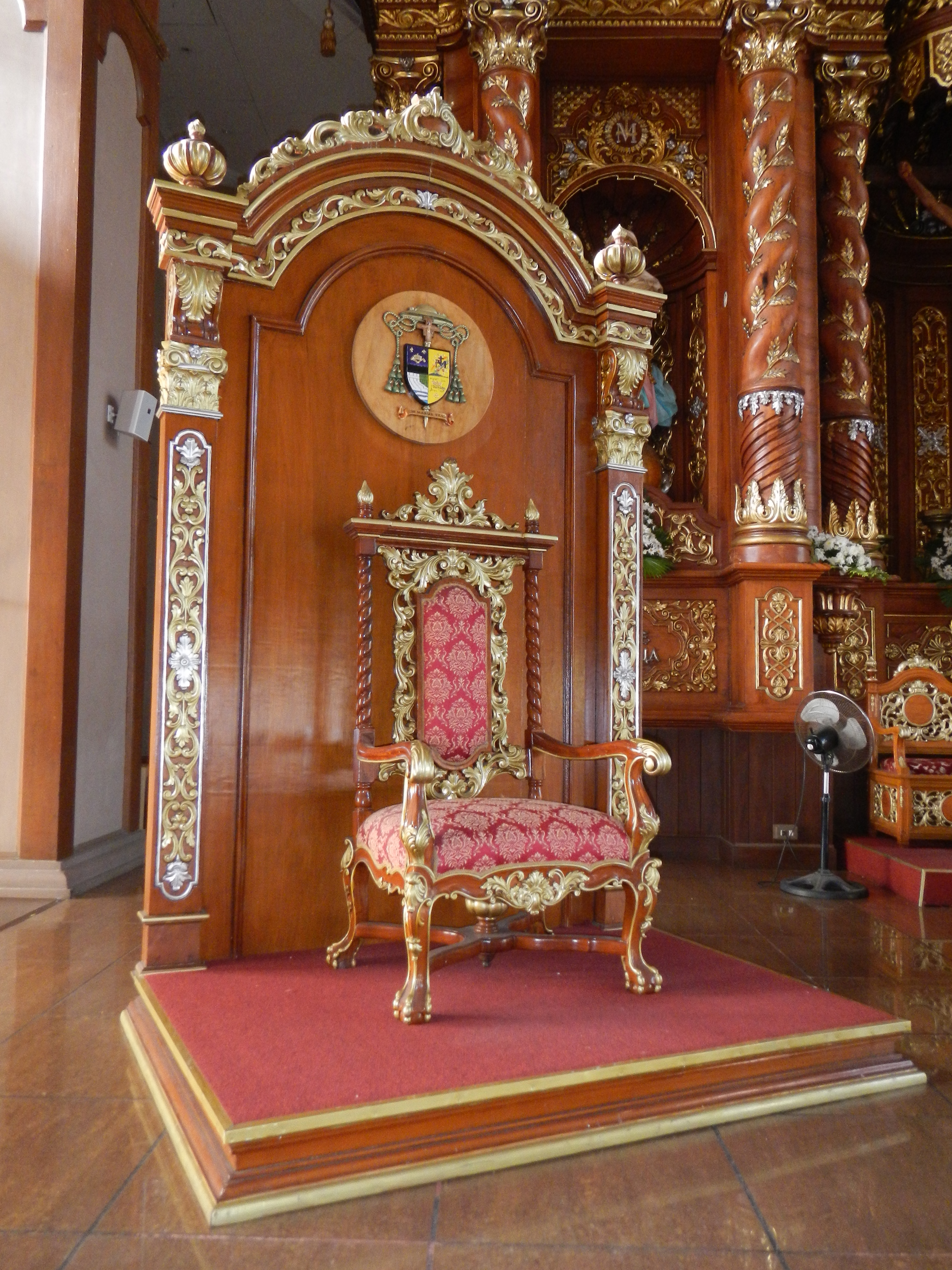
Bishop's cathedra

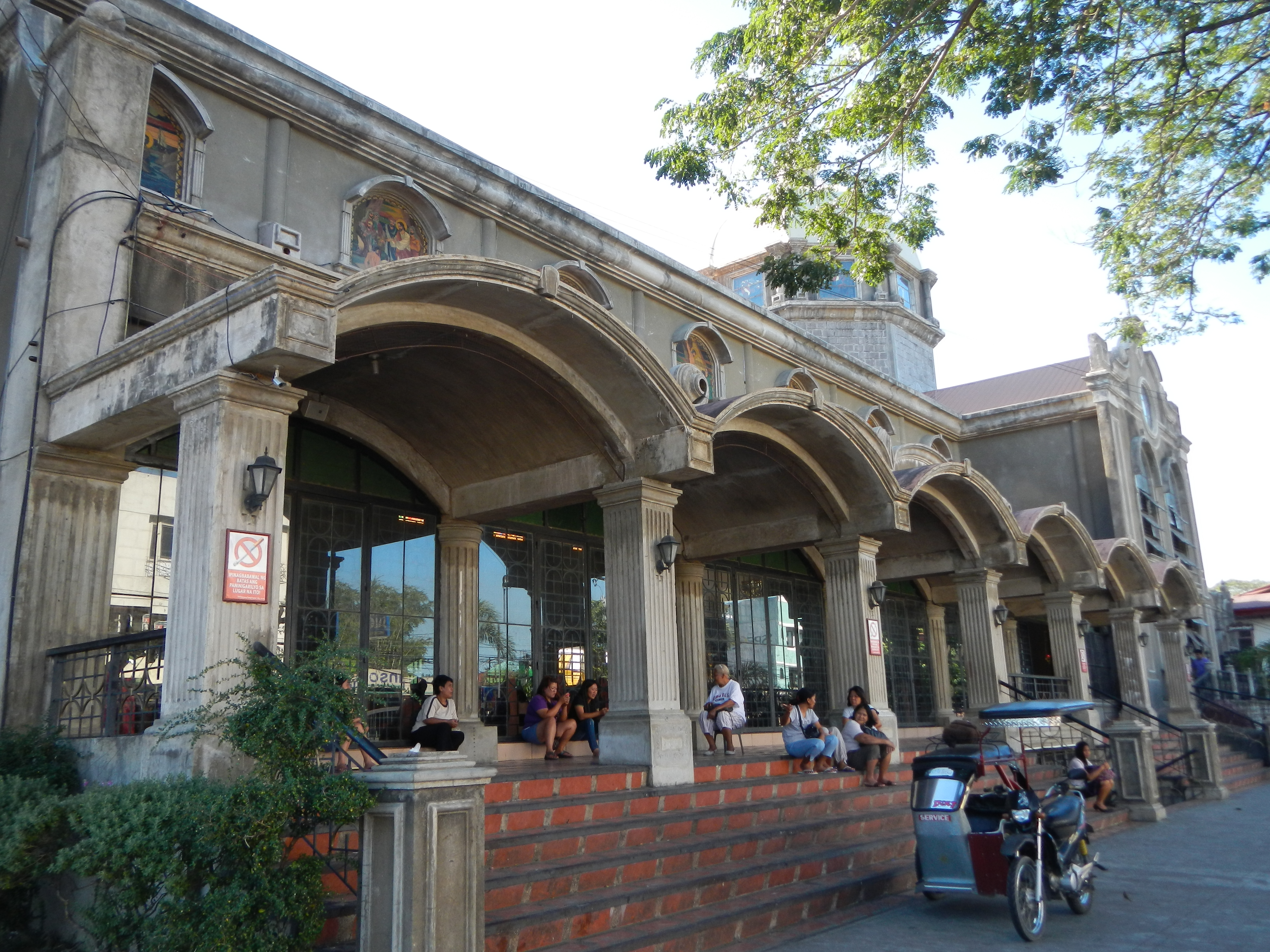
Side entrances of the cathedral

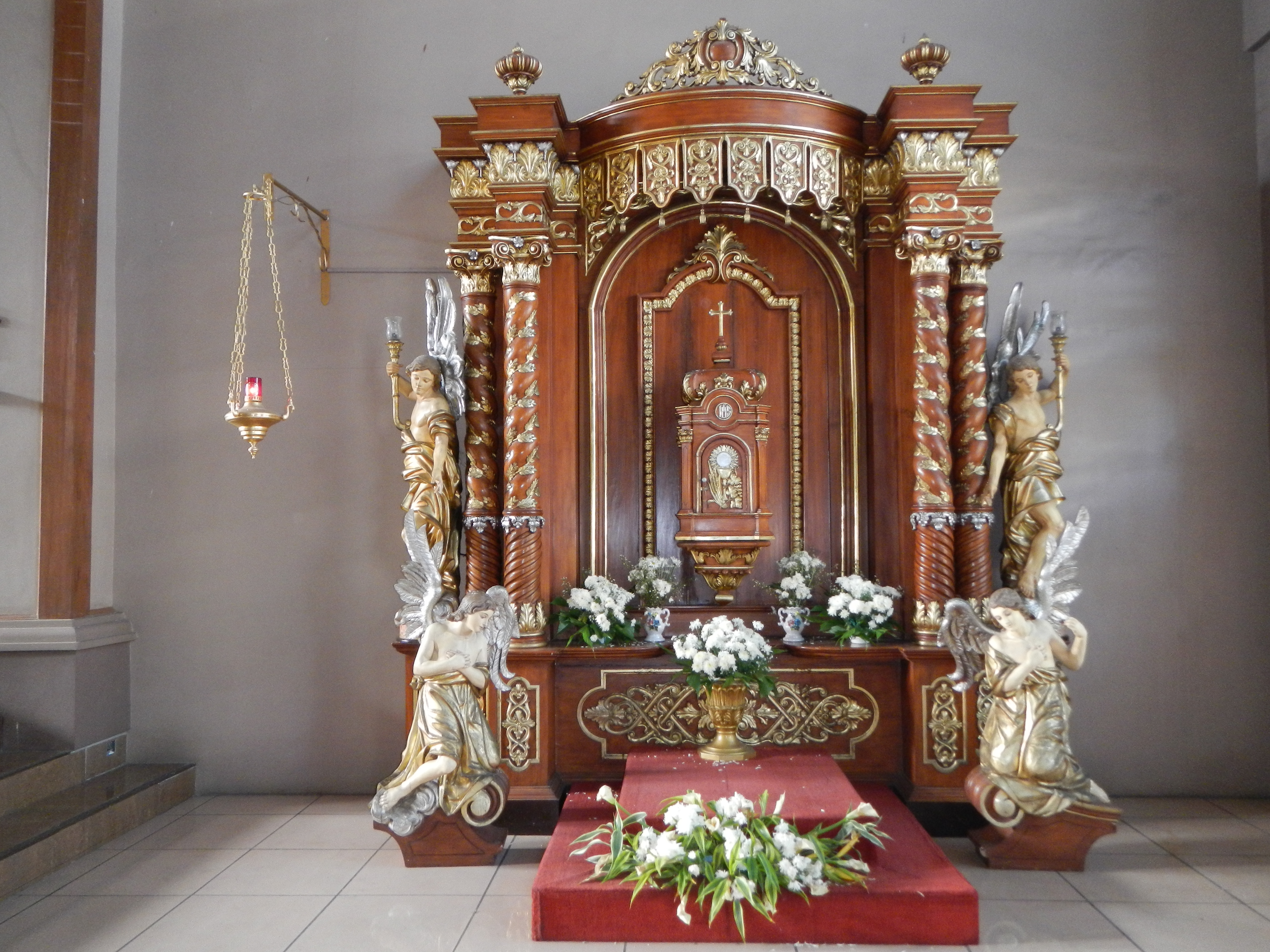
The cathedral's tabernacle altar

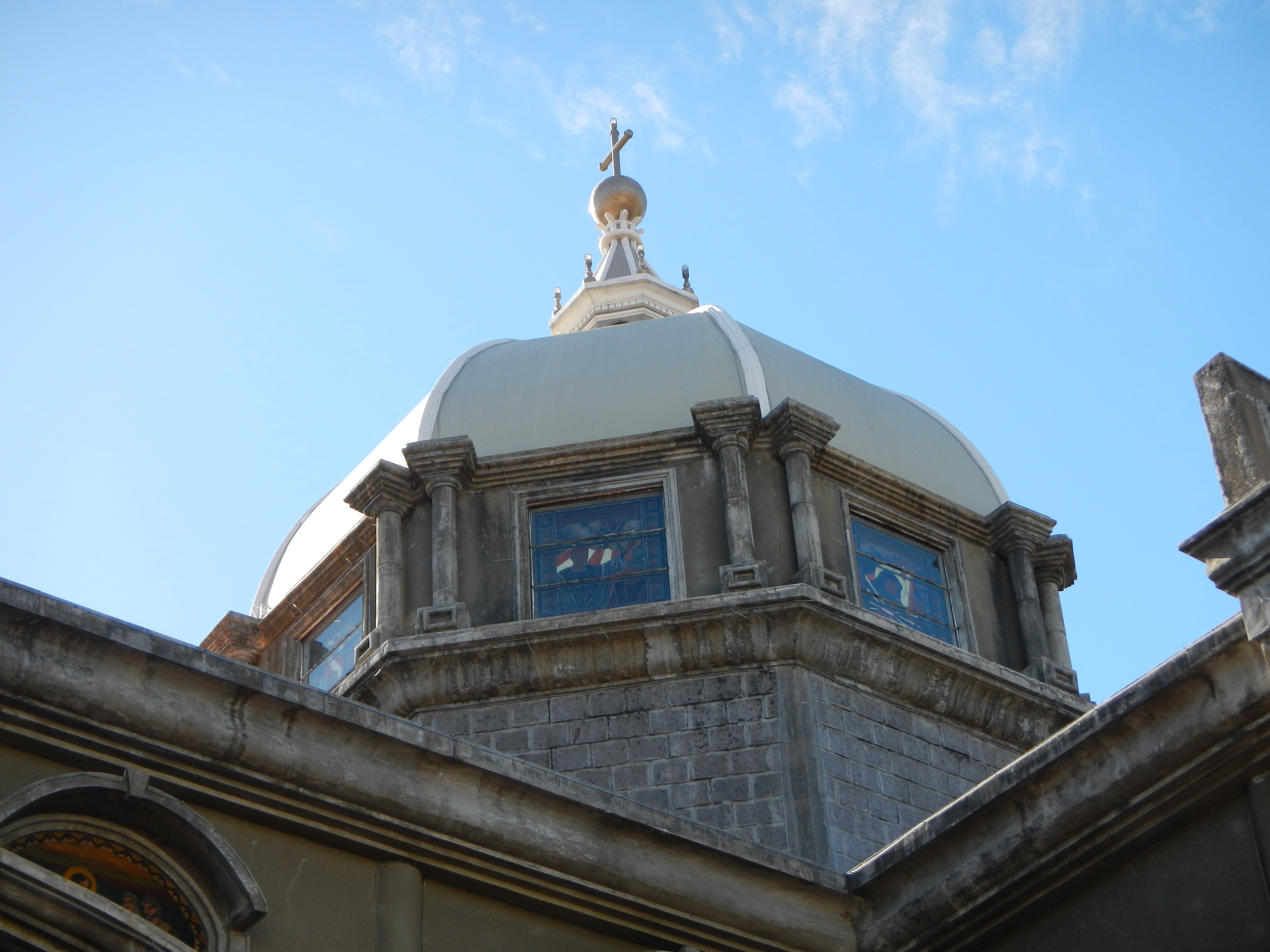
The dome in detail

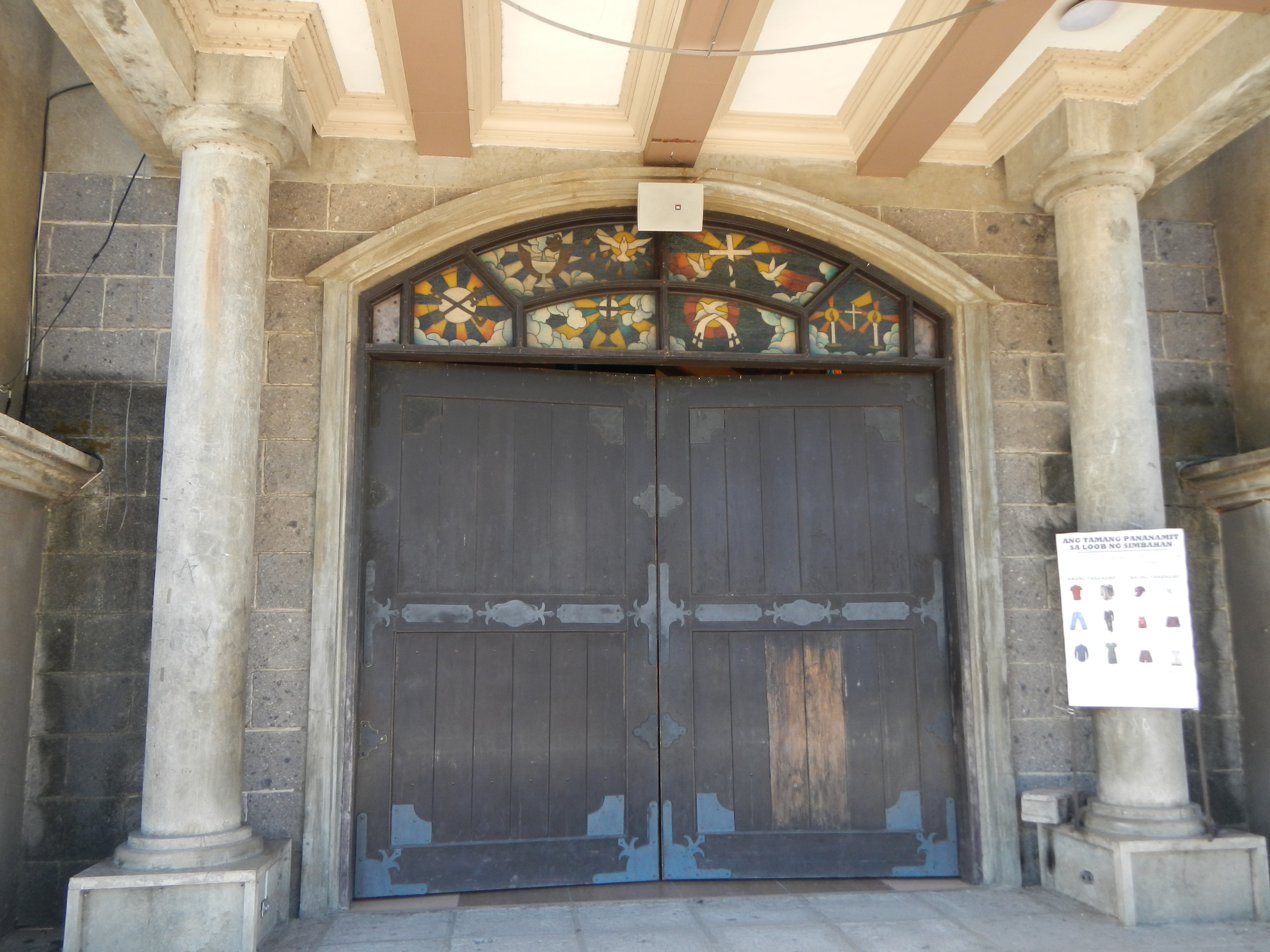
The cathedral's main doorway

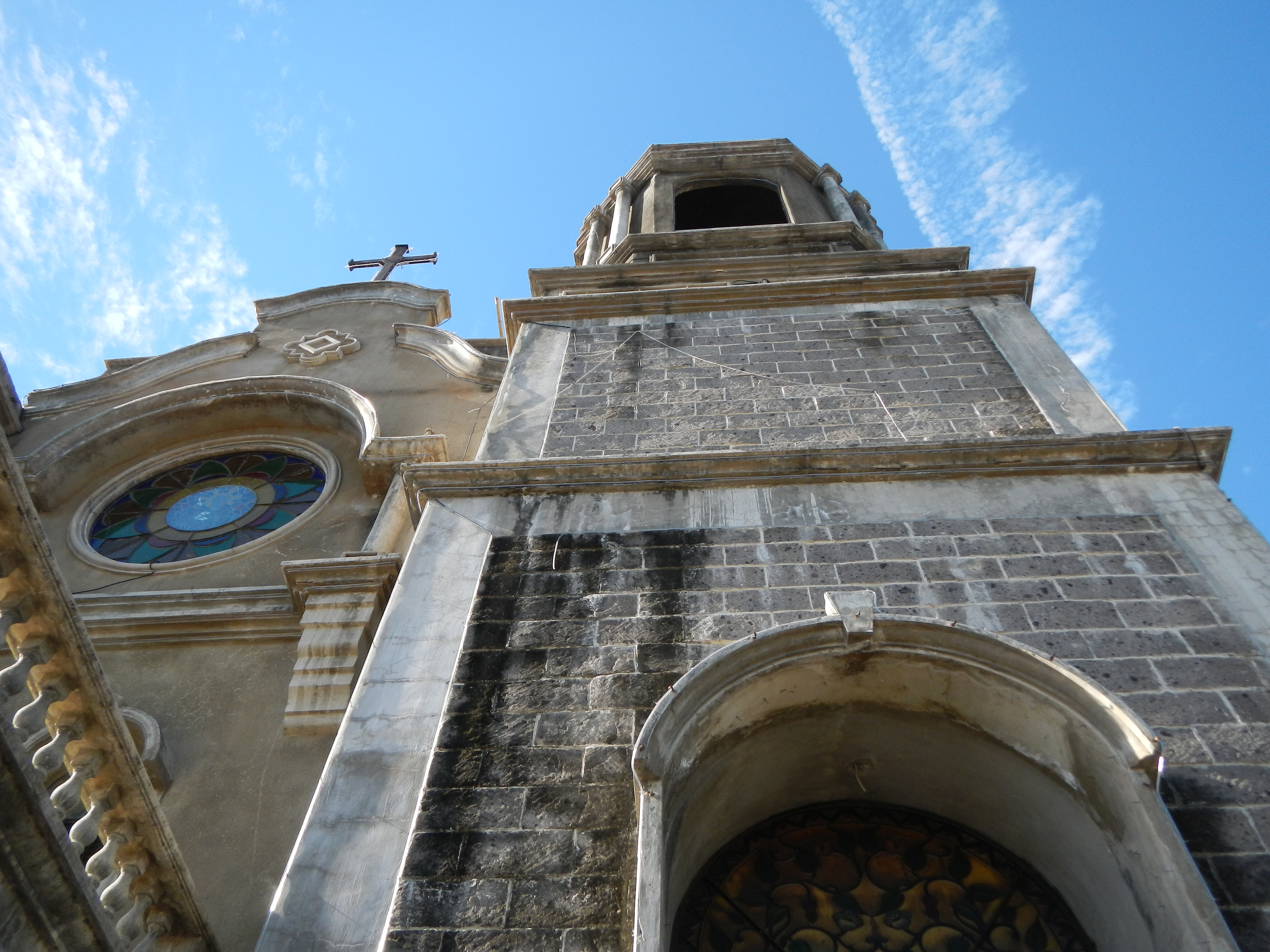
The bell tower of the cathedral

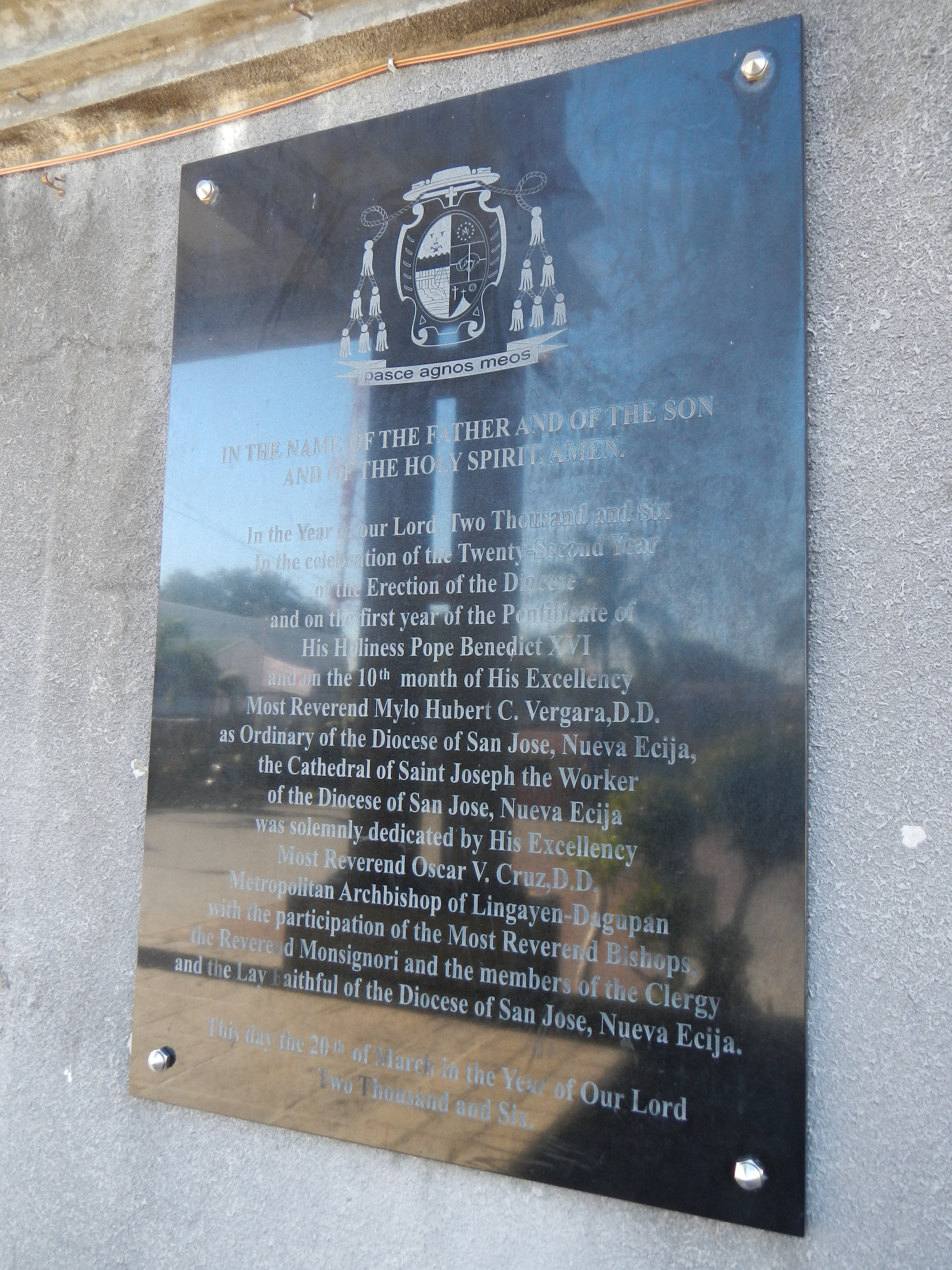
The dedication plaque on the cathedral
