= Santo Domingo, Nueva Ecija =

Municipality in Nueva Ecija, Philippines

Santo Domingo
- Municipality
- Municipality of Santo Domingo
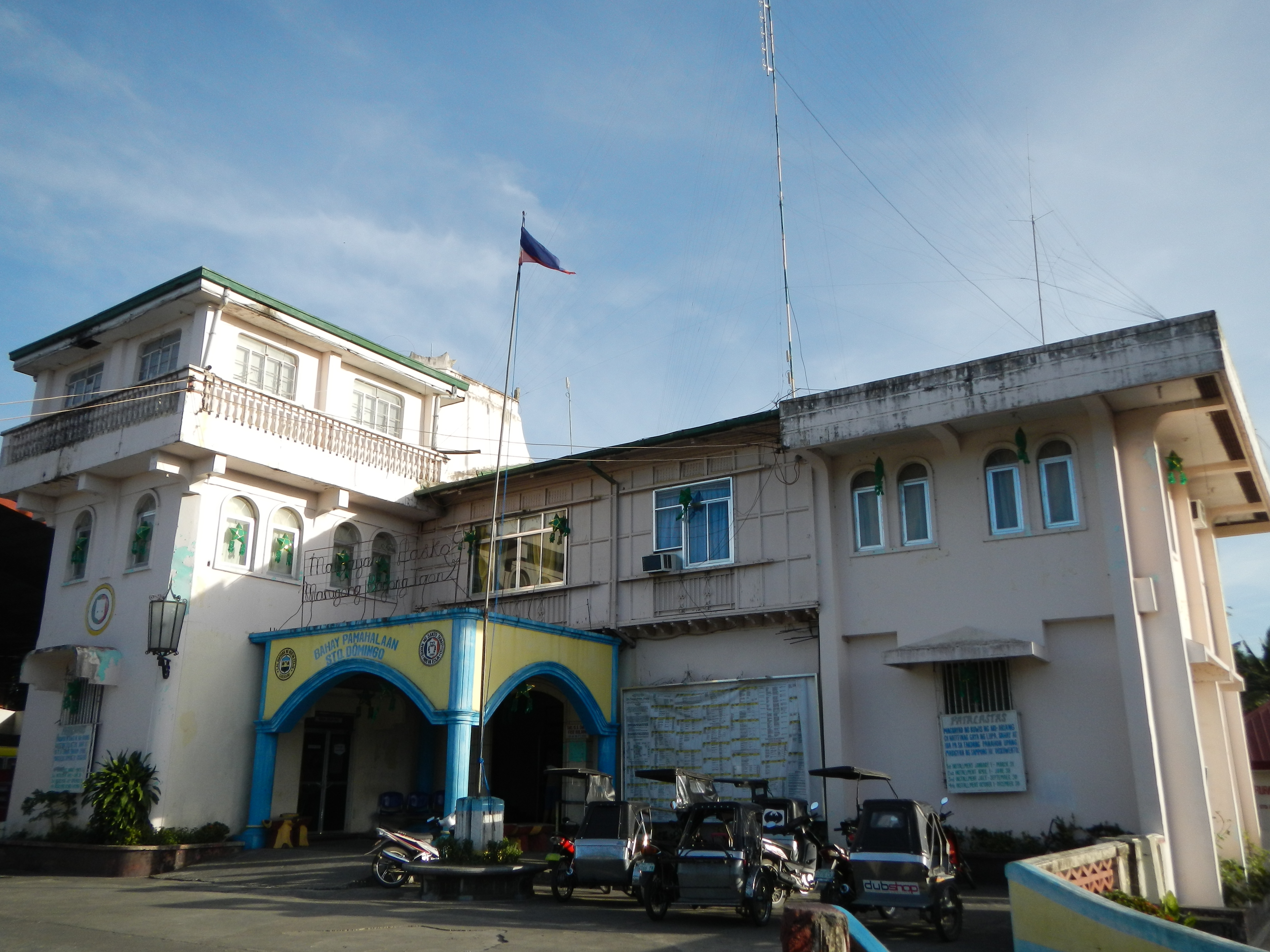
- Municipal Hall

- Seal

- Map of Nueva Ecija with Santo Domingo highlighted
- Interactive map of Santo Domingo
- Location within the Philippines
- Coordinates: 15°35′24″N 120°52′43″E
- Country: Philippines
- Region: Central Luzon
- Province: Nueva Ecija
- District: 1st district
- Named for: Saint Dominic
- Barangays: 24 (see Barangays)

Government
  - Type: Sangguniang Bayan
  - Mayor: Leonido de Guzman Jr.
  - Vice Mayor: Jhelyn Domingo - Velasco
  - Representative: Mikaela Angela B. Suansing
  - Municipal Council: Members: Junior L. Bugaoan; Arland Ryan P. Andres; Edgar S. de Leon Jr.; Eduardo A. Juan; Jesus V. Bermejo; Wilfredo A. Maniego; Emerson S. Matias; Olivia S. Pascual
  - Electorate: 39,637 voters (2025)

Area
  - Total: 74.88 km^{2} (28.91 sq mi)
- Elevation: 39 m (128 ft)
- Highest elevation: 55 m (180 ft)
- Lowest elevation: 26 m (85 ft)

Population (2024 census)
  - Total: 63,750
  - Density: 851.4/km^{2} (2,205/sq mi)
  - Households: 15,041

Economy
  - Income class: 1st municipal income class
  - Poverty incidence: 10.58% (2023)
  - Revenue: ₱ 253.9 million (2024)
  - Assets: ₱ 593.1 million (2024)
  - Expenditure: ₱ 224.2 million (2024)
  - Liabilities: ₱ 145.5 million (2024)

Service provider
  - Electricity: Nueva Ecija 2 Area 1 Electric Cooperative (NEECO 2 A1)
- Time zone: UTC+8 (PST)
- ZIP code: 3133
- PSGC: 0304929000
- IDD : area code: +63 (0)44
- Native languages: Ilocano; Tagalog
- Website: stodomingo-ne.ph

Santo Domingo, officially the Municipality of Santo Domingo (Ilocano: Ili ti Santo Domingo; Pangasinan: Baley na Santo Domingo;Tagalog: Bayan ng Santo Domingo), is a municipality in the province of Nueva Ecija, Philippines. According to the 2024 census, it has a population of 63,750 people.

== Etymology ==
The town is named after Saint Dominic, its patron saint.

== History ==
During the last quarter of the 17th century, Ilocos and Bulacan natives and Tagalogs from Cabanatuan migrated to Santo Domingo. They found in the settlement buri palms. Therefore, these people called the site, Pulong Buli. Santo Domingo de Guzman became their patron saint.

The settlement became a municipio but was later demoted to a mere barangay of Talavera, Nueva Ecija in 1903. It was later reverted to the political status of municipality. The Alejos, Juans, Samatras, Salamancas, Andreses, Pascuals and Tomases were the descendants of the founders of the town.

During the Japanese Occupation from 1942 to 1945, various local guerrillas and Hukbalahap communist groups fought side by side at Santo Domingo, aided by the Filipino soldiers of the Philippine Commonwealth Army units. Following the Allied liberation in 1945, over 4,500 Filipino soldiers and guerrillas had been killed or wounded, and 29,000 Japanese troops killed or captured in action.

== Geography ==
Santo Domingo is bordered by the municipalities of Talavera to the east, Quezon to the west, Science City of Muñoz to the north, Guimba to the northwest, and Aliaga to the south.

=== Barangays ===
Santo Domingo is politically subdivided into 24 barangays, as shown below. Each barangay consists of puroks and some have sitios.

- Baloc
- Buasao
- Burgos
- Cabugao
- Casulucan (disputed with Talavera)
- Comitang
- Concepcion
- Dolores
- General Luna
- Hulo
- Mabini
- Malasin
- Malayantoc
- Mambarao
- Poblacion
- Malaya (Pook Malaya)
- Pulong Buli
- Sagaba
- San Agustin
- San Fabian
- San Francisco
- San Pascual
- Santa Rita
- Santo Rosario

=== Climate ===
Climate data for Santo Domingo, Nueva Ecija
Month	Jan	Feb	Mar	Apr	May	Jun	Jul	Aug	Sep	Oct	Nov	Dec	Year
Mean daily maximum °C (°F)	28 (82)	29 (84)	31 (88)	33 (91)	32 (90)	31 (88)	30 (86)	29 (84)	29 (84)	30 (86)	30 (86)	28 (82)	30 (86)
Mean daily minimum °C (°F)	20 (68)	20 (68)	21 (70)	23 (73)	24 (75)	25 (77)	24 (75)	24 (75)	24 (75)	23 (73)	22 (72)	21 (70)	23 (73)
Average precipitation mm (inches)	6 (0.2)	4 (0.2)	6 (0.2)	17 (0.7)	82 (3.2)	122 (4.8)	151 (5.9)	123 (4.8)	124 (4.9)	99 (3.9)	37 (1.5)	21 (0.8)	792 (31.1)
Average rainy days	3.3	2.5	3.6	6.6	17.7	22.2	25.2	23.7	23.2	17.9	9.2	5.2	160.3
Source: Meteoblue

== Demographics ==
Population census of Santo Domingo

Year	Pop.	±% p.a.
1903	3,249	—
1918	6,431	+4.66%
1939	12,163	+3.08%
1948	12,730	+0.51%
1960	16,983	+2.43%
1970	22,828	+3.00%
1975	25,306	+2.09%
1980	29,013	+2.77%

Year	Pop.	±% p.a.
1990	35,864	+2.14%
1995	40,992	+2.54%
2000	45,934	+2.47%
2007	47,960	+0.60%
2010	50,983	+2.25%
2015	57,943	+2.47%
2020	61,092	+1.12%
2024	63,750	+1.03%

Source: Philippine Statistics Authority

=== Religion ===
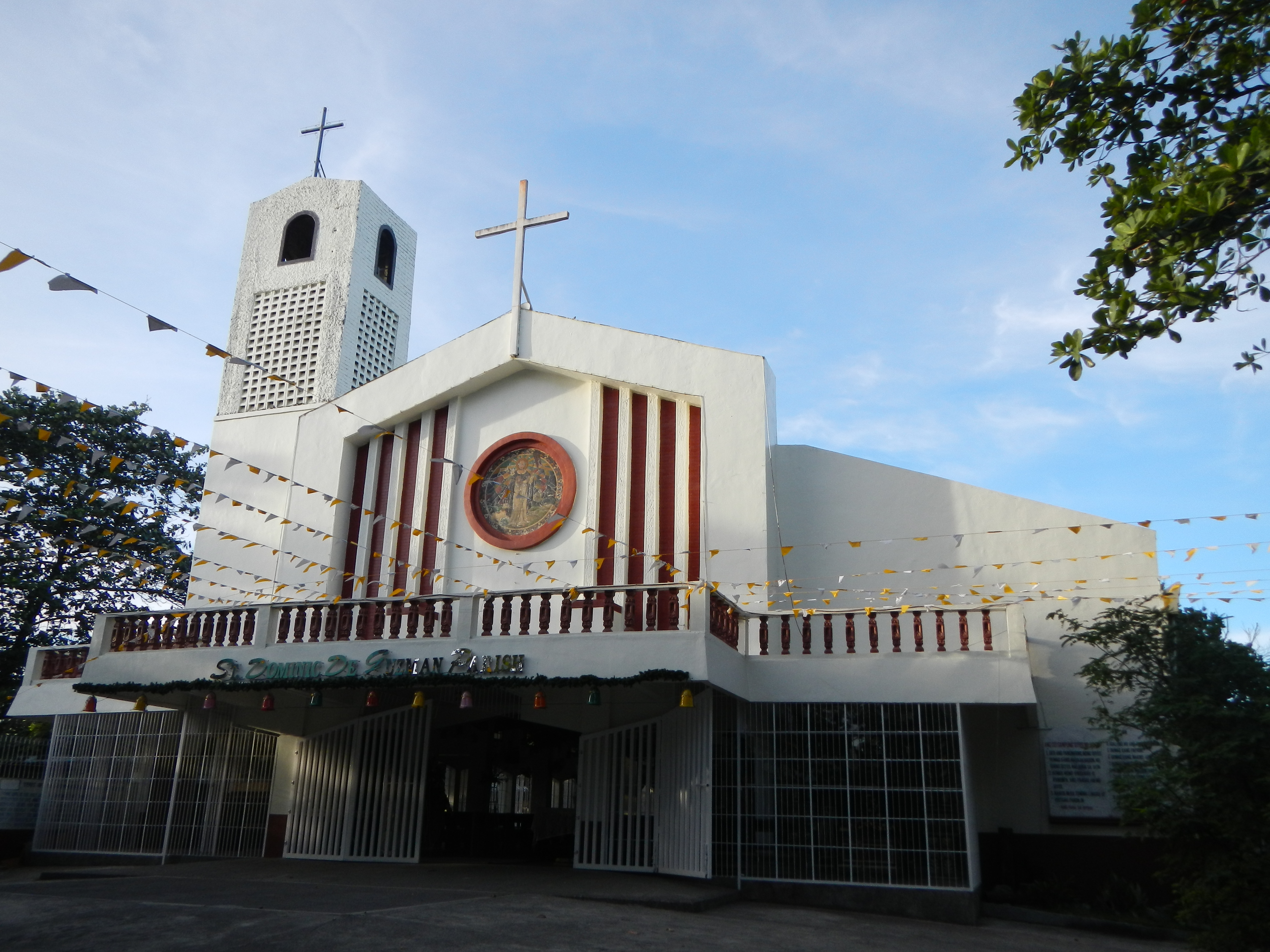
St. Dominic Parish Church facade

==== St. Dominic Parish Church ====
The 1896 St. Dominic Parish Church (Real St., Poblacion, Santo Domingo, 3133 Nueva Ecija) belongs to the Roman Catholic Diocese of San Jose. Most. Rev. Roberto Calara Mallari, D.D. (since 15 May 2012) is the head of the Diocese. The Church's Parish Priest is Very Rev. Mnsgr. Rolando Mabutol, Hp and its Parish Administrator is Rev. Fr. Ian Christopher D. Andal (Acting Parish Priest) (Vicariate of St. Dominic - Diocesis Sancti Josephi in Insulis Philippinis, Suffragan of Lingayen-Dagupan; created: February 16, 1984, erected July 14, 1984, comprising the City of San Jose and the Science City of Muñoz and 12 other municipalities in Northern Nueva Ecija; Titular: St. Joseph the Worker, May 1). Its Vicar Forane is Fr. Bonifacio P. Flores Saint Dominic Parish Titular: Saint Dominic de Guzman; Year of Establishment: 1929.

Founded in 1896 as part of the Manila Archdiocese, in 1929, the Church was established and in 1950, the Parish became part of the Diocese of Cabanatuan. In 1977 the Baloc Parish was severed from Santo Domingo. On July 14, 1984, the Diocese of Cabanatuan was split into 2, and the San Jose Diocese had 16 Parishes including Santo Domingo Parish. The first Parish Priest of Santo Domingo was Fr. Emilio Gutierez and the 19th, the incumbent is Fr. Edwin I. Bravo. The Parish has a population of 21,677 Catholics: 75%.

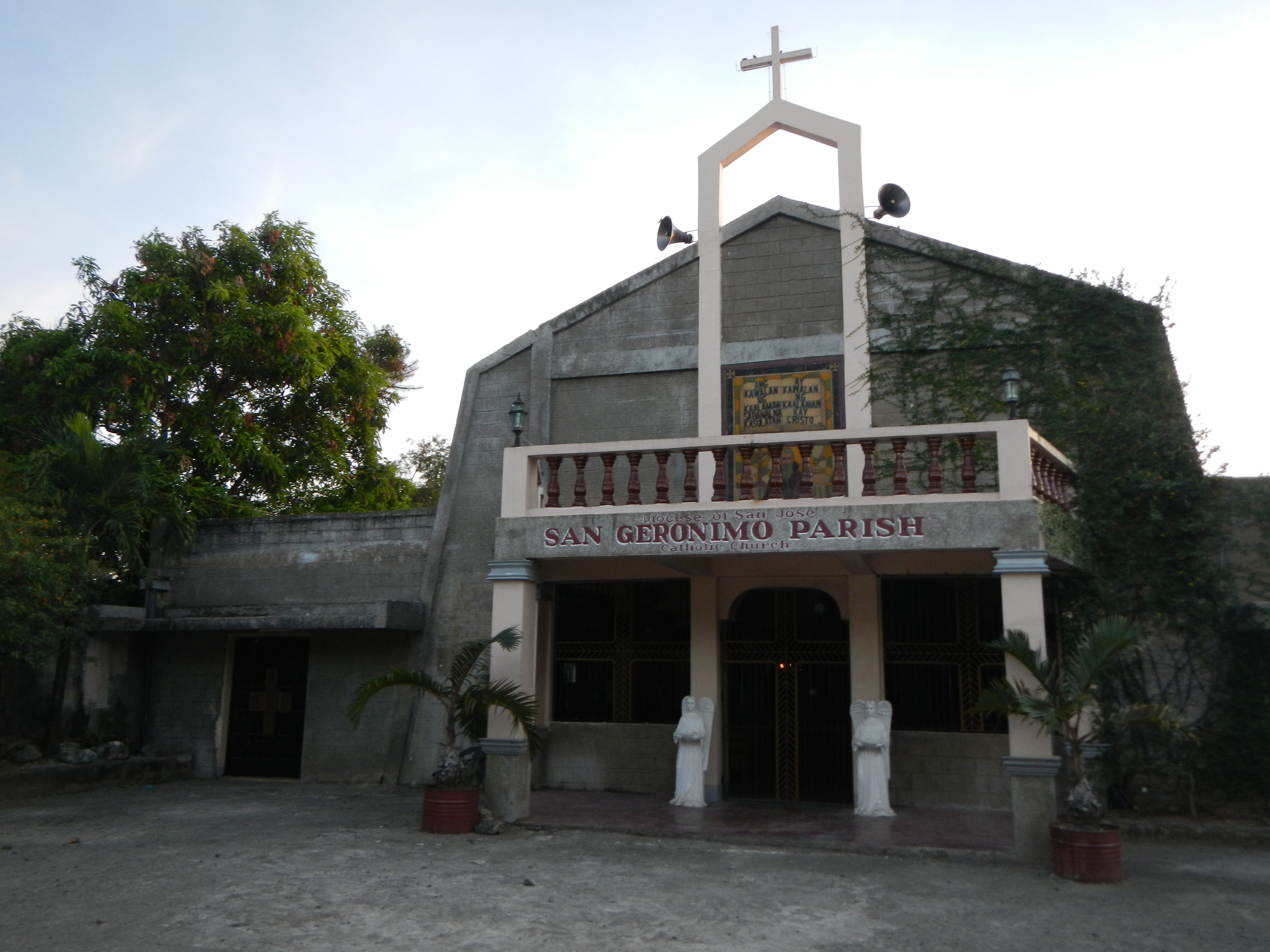
St. Jerome Parish Church

==== St. Jerome Parish Church ====
The St. Jerome Parish Church (Barangay Baloc, Santo Domingo, 3133 Nueva Ecija) belongs to the Roman Catholic Diocese of San Jose. Most. Rev. Roberto Calara Mallari, D.D. (since 15 May 2012) is the head of the Diocese (Vicariate of St. Dominic - Diocesis Sancti Josephi in Insulis Philippinis, Suffragan of Lingayen-Dagupan; created: February 16, 1984, erected July 14, 1984, comprising the City of San Jose and the Science City of Muñoz and 12 other municipalities in Northern Nueva Ecija; Titular: St. Joseph the Worker, May 1). Its Vicar Forane is Fr. Bonifacio P. Flores and its Parish Priest: Fr. Rosalito F. Cabanting. The Population is 45,049 Catholics -8%.

==== Iglesia Filipina Independiente, San Geronimo Church ====
The Iglesia Filipina Independiente, San Geronimo Church is also one of the landmark religious heritage of Santo Domingo.

==== Dambana ni San Geronimo ====
Fr. Resty Valenzuela Ahyong Baloc established his own Dambana ni San Geronimo when he transferred from the Roman Catholic Church. The people of Baloc, Santo Domingo Nueva Ecija became religious because of Him. He wrote a book about the life of St. Jerome.

== Economy ==
Poverty incidence of Santo Domingo (%)

Source: Philippine Statistics Authority

As an agricultural town, Santo Domingo is famous for its scenic agricultural landscape amid its Philippine duck raising industry.

== Government ==
=== Local government ===
Santo Domingo is part of the 1st congressional district of the province of Nueva Ecija. It is governed by a mayor, designated as its local chief executive, and by a municipal council as its legislative body in accordance with the Local Government Code. The mayor, vice mayor, and the municipal councilors are elected directly in polls held every three years.

=== Elected officials ===
Members of the Municipal Council (2022–2025)
Position	Name
District Representative (Nueva Ecija's 1st congressional district)	Mikaela Angela Suansing
Governor	Aurelio Umali
Mayor	Imee L. De Guzman
Vice-Mayor	St. James Domingo
Councilors	Angge Paulino
Councilors	Arland Ryan Andres
Councilors	Junior Bugaoan
Councilors	Olive Pascual
Councilors	Edgar De Leon Jr.
Councilors	Willy Maniego
Councilors	Emerson Matias
Councilors	Jojo Gozum

== Education ==
The Sto. Domingo Schools District Office governs all educational institutions within the municipality. It oversees the management and operations of all private and public, from primary to secondary schools.

=== Primary and elementary schools ===
- Baloc Elementary School
- Bethel Educational Center
- Buasao Elementary School
- Burgos Elementary School
- Cabugao Elementary School
- Chosen Christian School
- Comitang Elementary School
- Dagat-Dagatan Elementary
- Dolores Elementary School
- Dona Milagros S. Chioco (Hulo) Elementary School
- Felix T. Pasucal Elementary School
- Gen. Luna Elementary School
- Hazel Joy Montessori
- Ilog Baliwag Elementary School
- Kabulihan Elementary School
- Mabini Elementary School
- Malaya Elementary School
- Malayantoc Elementary School
- Pelmoka-Lina Elementary School
- Pulong Buli Elementary School
- Rogelio DG Valdezotto Elementary School
- ROHI Academy
- Rominas Heavenly Angels Montessori
- San Fabian Elementary School
- San Francisco Elementary School
- San Pascual Elementary School
- Sto. Domingo Central School
- Sta. Rita Elementary School
- Sto. Rosario Elementary School
- Villa Juan Elementary School
- Violago-Gatdula Elementary School

=== Secondary schools ===
- Concepcion Integrated School
- Julia Ortiz Luiz National High School
- Sto. Rosario National High School
- Sto. Domingo National Trade School

== Gallery ==
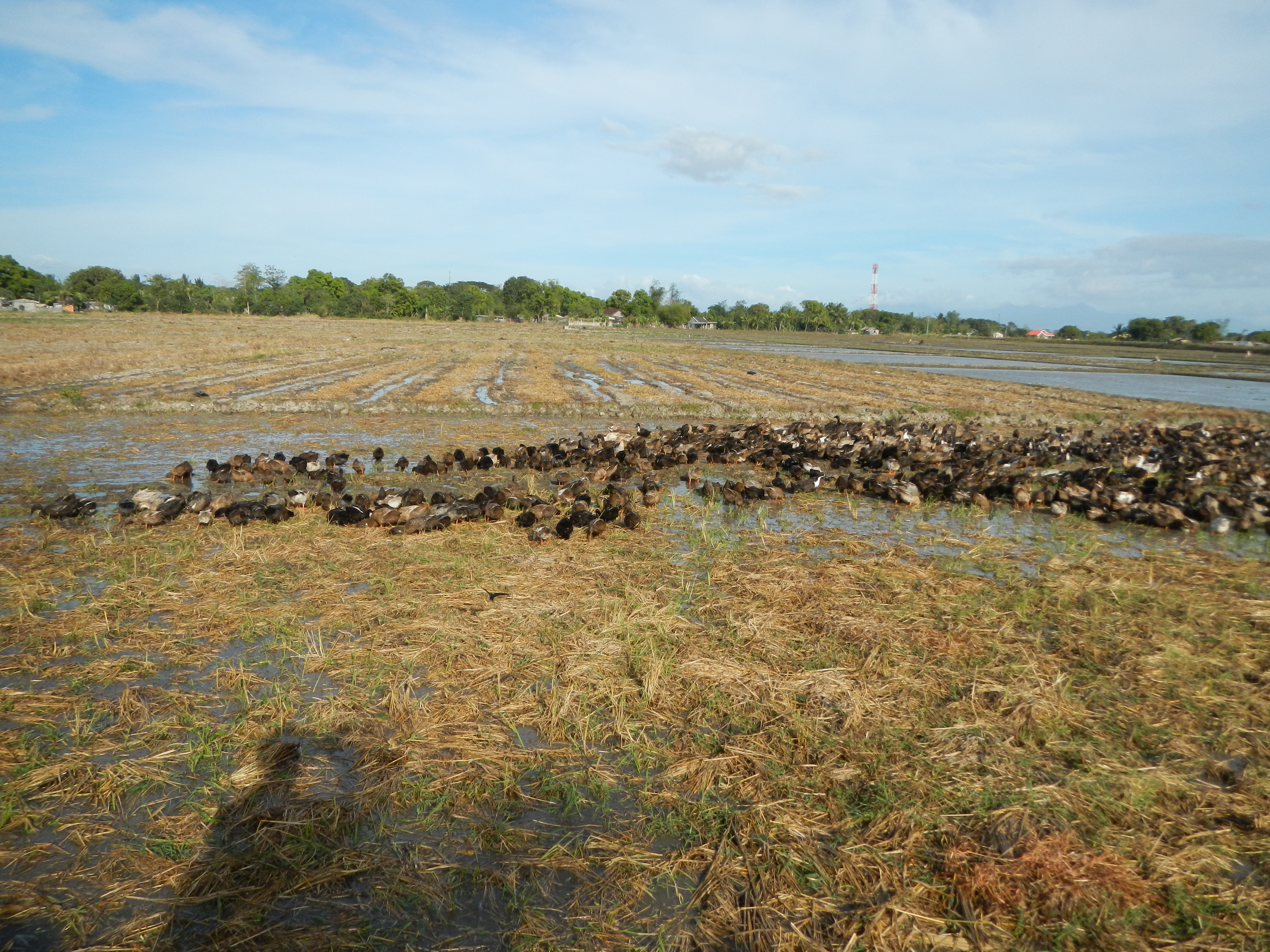
Rice fields are alternatively used for duck feeding

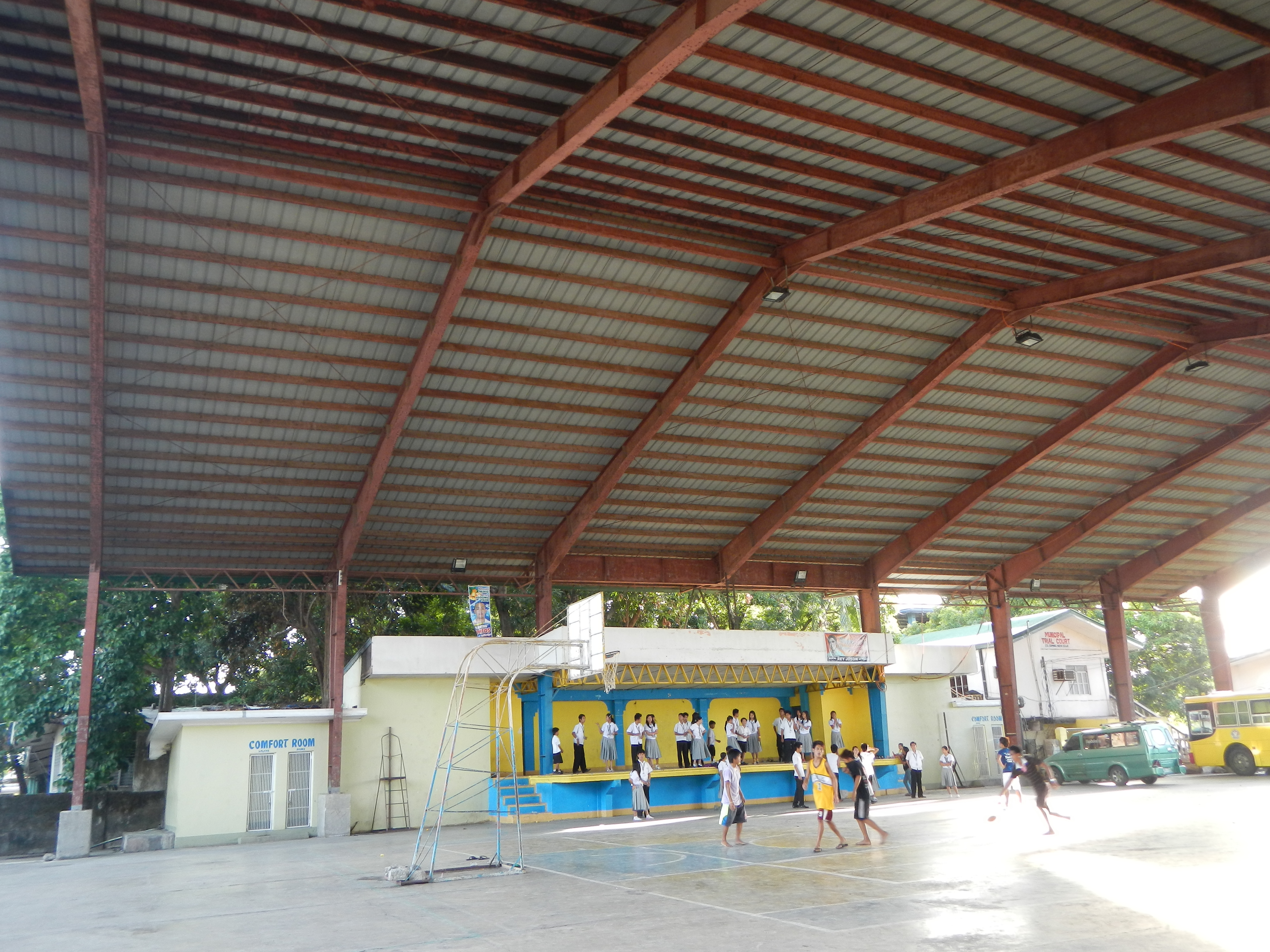
Basketball court and gymnasium

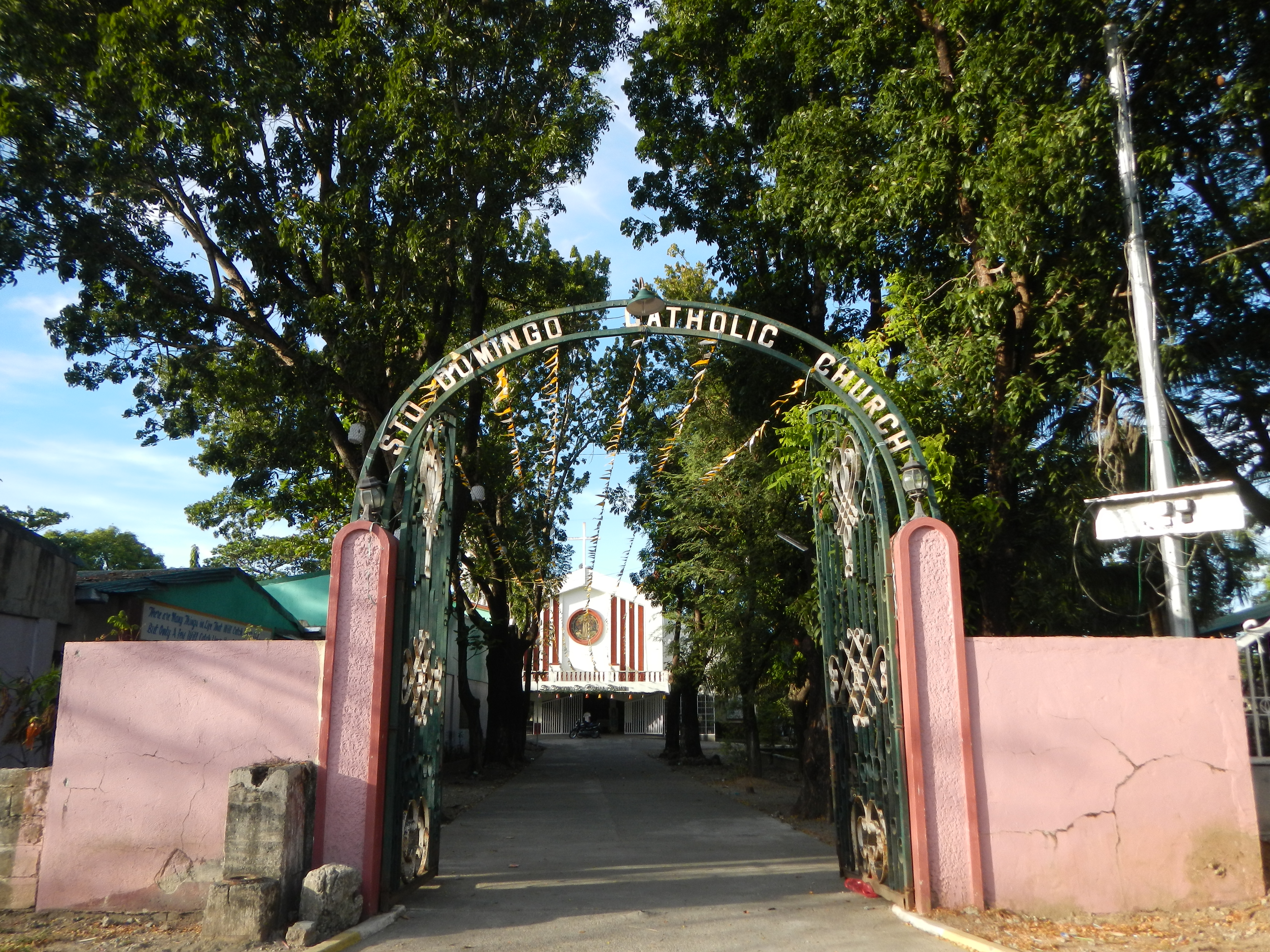
St. Dominic Parish Church

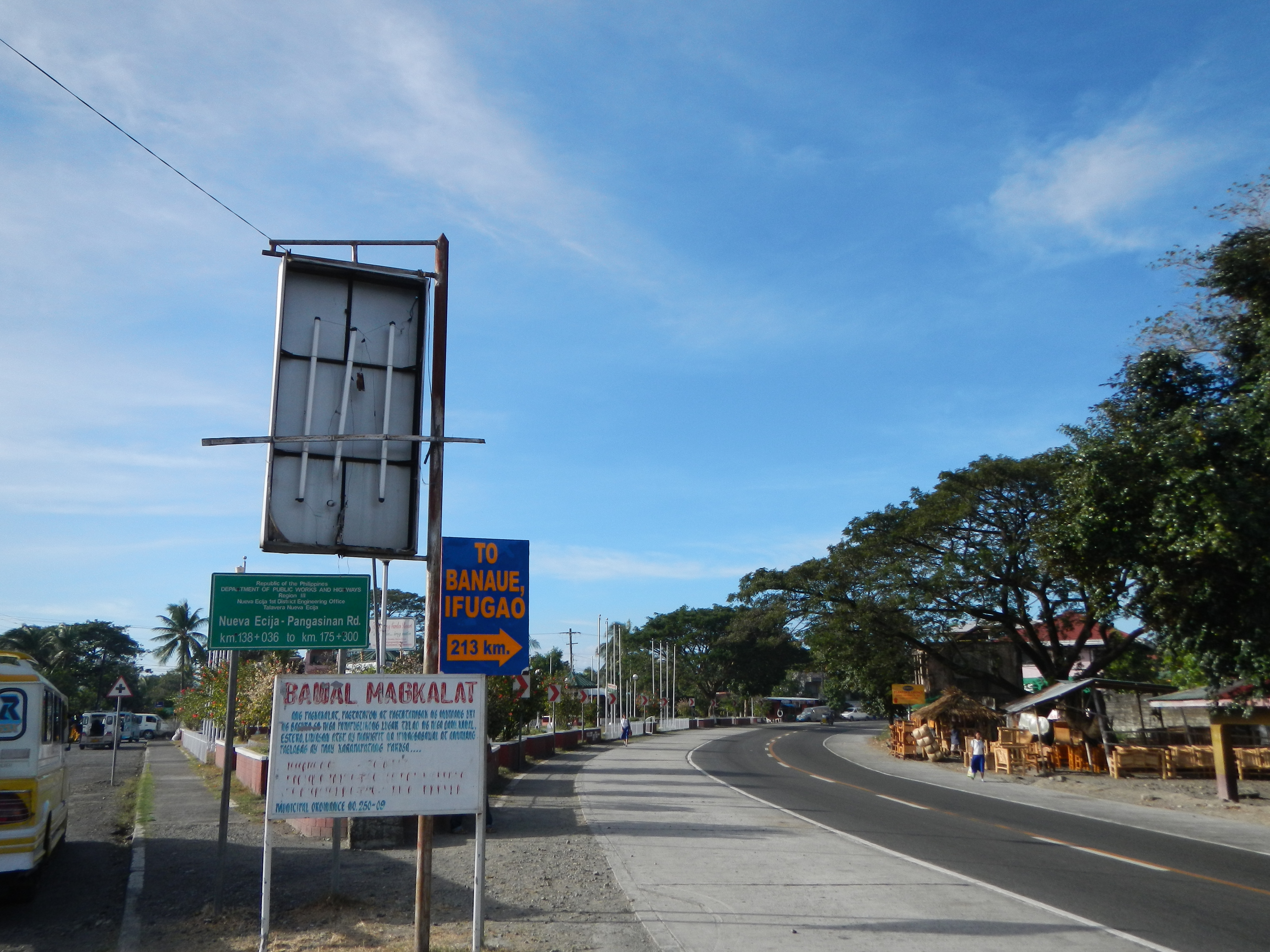
Nueva Ecija-Pangasinan Road (Maharlika Highway, Baloc)

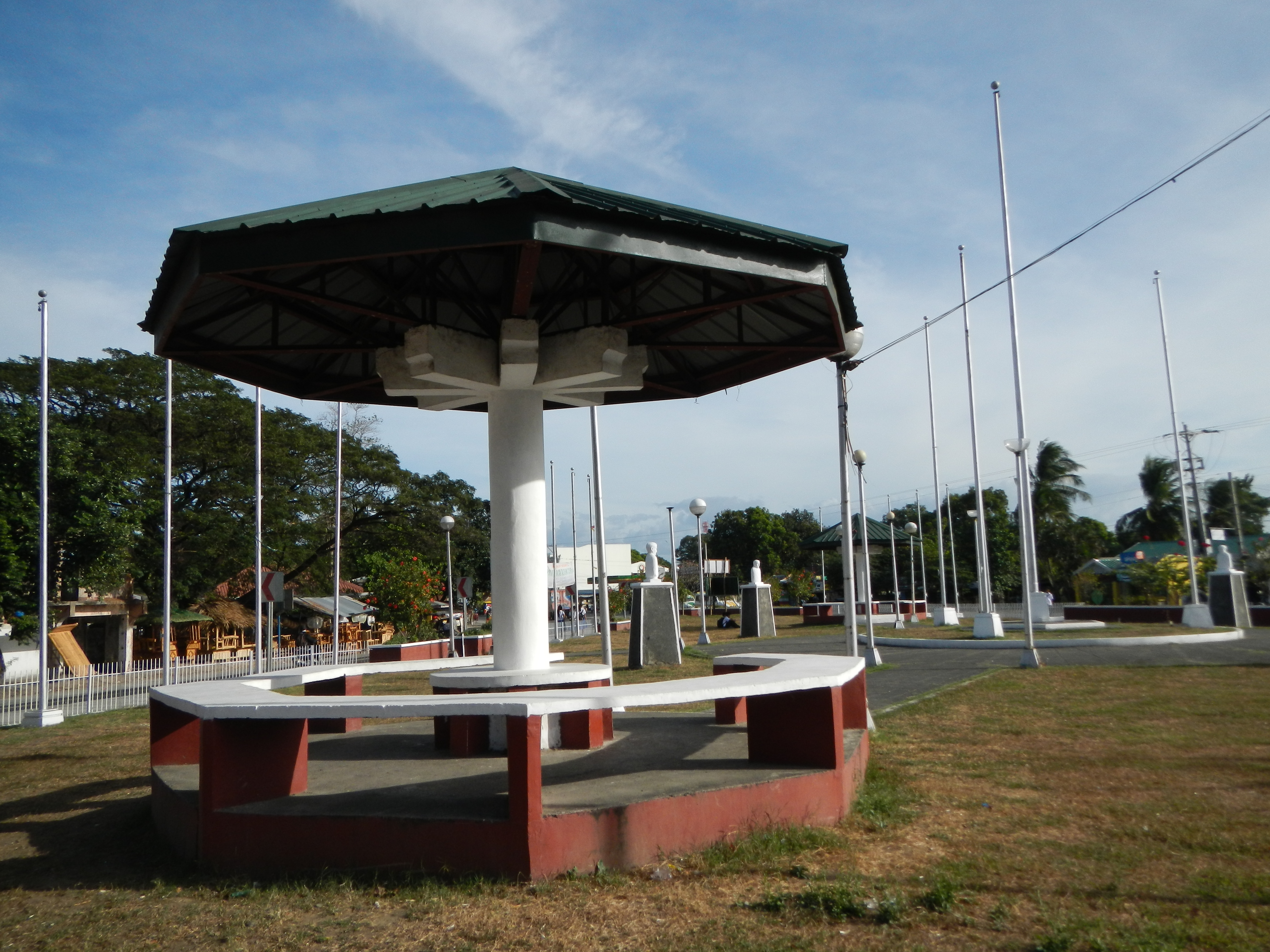
Hen. Mariano Noriel Centennial Park

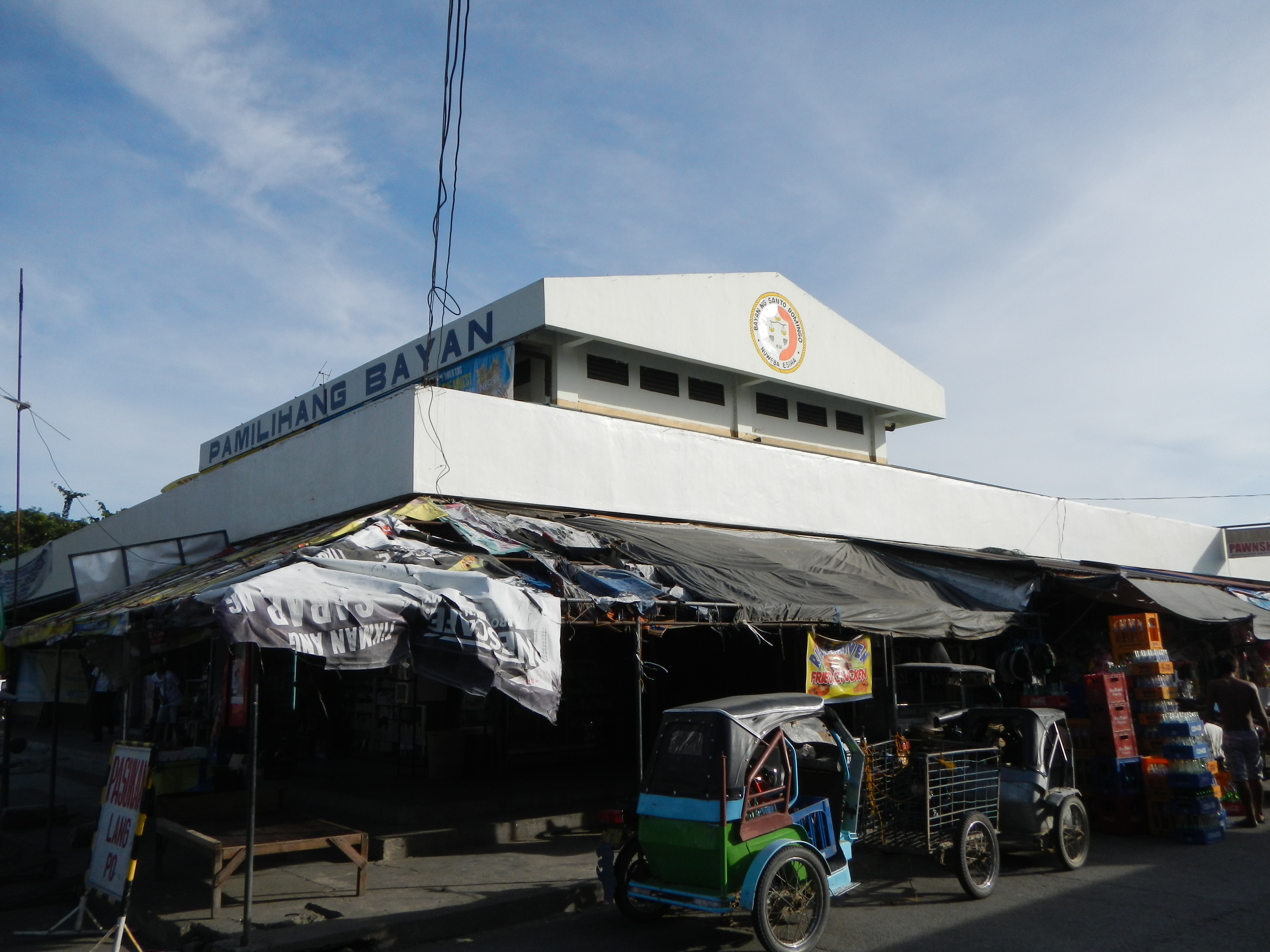
Public market
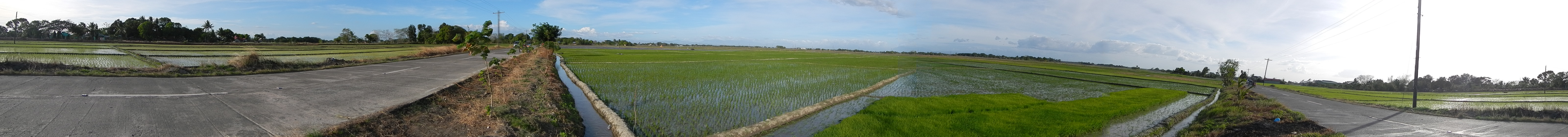
Agricultural Santo Domingo
