= Saint Augustine Major Seminary =

Roman Catholic seminary in Oriental Mindoro, Philippines

- Religious affiliation: Roman Catholic
- Location: Tagaytay, Cavite, Philippines; 14°07′40″N 120°57′43″E
- Location in Luzon Saint Augustine Major Seminary (Philippines)

The Saint Augustine Major Seminary or SASMA is a Catholic, formation seminary of the Apostolic Vicariate of Calapan, Oriental Mindoro located in Tagaytay, Cavite, Philippines. The seminarians of SASMA attend to their academics at the Divine Word Seminary.
