= Samuel Agcaracar =

Filipino Catholic bishop (born 1969)

His Excellency, The Most Reverend Samuel Agcaracar SVD, D.D.
- Bishop of San Jose, Nueva Ecija
- Church: Roman Catholic Church
- Province: Lingayen-Dagupan
- See: San Jose, Nueva Ecija
- Appointed: November 21, 2025
- Installed: February 6, 2026
- Predecessor: Roberto Mallari
- Previous posts: rector, Divine Word Seminary Tagaytay (2020-2026)

Orders
- Ordination: February 3, 2007 by Gaudencio Rosales
- Consecration: January 17, 2026 by Luis Antonio Tagle

Personal details
- Born: Samuel Naceno Agcaracar; December 4, 1969 (age 56) Claveria, Cagayan, Philippines
- Education: Divine Word College of Bangued; Divine Word College of Laoag; Christ the King Mission Seminary, Quezon City; Divine Word Seminary Tagaytay; Pontifical Gregorian University
- Motto: Fac Nos Omnes Unum in Eo (Latin for 'Make us one in Him') (Note: From John 17:21)
- Coat of arms: Samuel Agcaracar's coat of arms

Ordination history
History
Priestly ordination
- Ordained by: Gaudencio Rosales
Episcopal consecration
- Principal consecrator: Luis Antonio Tagle
- Co-consecrators: Charles John Brown; Pablito Tagura

Styles of Samuel N. Agcaracar
- Reference style: His Excellency; The Most Reverend
- Spoken style: Your Excellency
- Religious style: Bishop

Samuel Naceno Agcaracar (born December 4, 1969) is a Filipino Catholic prelate, serving as Bishop of San Jose, Nueva Ecija since 2026.

== Early life and education ==
Agcaracar was born on December 4, 1969, in Claveria, Cagayan, to a family of farmers. He studied at the Divine Word College of Bangued, graduating with a bachelor's degree in History of Religious Education, before continuing at the Divine Word College of Laoag, where he obtained a master's degree in education.

Entering the seminary after being a teacher and catechist in his hometown, he took up his philosophical studies at the Christ the King Mission Seminary in Quezon City, followed by his theological studies at the Divine Word School of Theology in Tagaytay. He then studied at the Pontifical Gregorian University, where he was awarded a doctorate in missiology.

== Ministry ==
=== Priesthood ===
Agcaracar entered the novitiate on June 1, 2001, and took his first religious vows on June 2, 2002. He then had his perpetual vows on May 14, 2006, and on February 3, 2007, he was ordained to the priesthood.

Following his ordination, he was assigned as the director of education at the Divine Word College of Calapan in Oriental Mindoro, a role he took up until 2008. From 2011 to 2014, he was a professor at the Divine Word Seminary in Tagaytay, where, since 2020 until his episcopal appointment, was its rector.

=== Episcopate ===
On November 21, 2025, Pope Leo XIV appointed him Bishop of San Jose in Nueva Ecija, becoming the fifth bishop of the diocese. He succeeded Roberto Mallari, who was transferred to the Diocese of Tarlac in March.

Agcaracar was ordained to the episcopate on January 17, 2026, at the Divine Word Seminary by Cardinal Luis Antonio Tagle, with Apostolic Nuncio Charles John Brown, and Pablito Tagura of the Apostolic Vicariate of San Jose in Mindoro as co-consecrators.

He was installed on February 6, 2026 at the Cathedral-Parish of St. Joseph the Worker by Apostolic Nuncio Charles John Brown, with Archbishop Socrates Villegas.

== Environmental advocacy ==
Agcaracar founded the SVD Laudato Si' Farm, a 5.8-hectare (14-acre) farm in Tagaytay which opened in 2021. Inspired by the namesake encyclical of Pope Francis, the farm's beginnings began when priests and seminarians cleared around six hectares of land for plantation to address their needs during the COVID-19 pandemic in the Philippines. It has evolved to an eco-tourism destination, drawing around 5,000 visitors every weekend.

In 2025, he noted that farmers, despite their vital role in food production, are seen as the "poorest of the poor" and emphasized the need to uphold their dignity. He also said that the Laudato Si' Farm allowed him to reconnect with his family's roots and to empower more farmers.

== Notes ==
Catholic Church titles
| Preceded by Roberto Mallari | Bishop of San Jose, Nueva Ecija; February 6, 2026 – present | Incumbent |
