= Divine Word Seminary =

Private college in Cavite, Philippines

Divine Word Seminary Tagaytay
- The Seminary Chapel
- Other name: DWST
- Motto: Latin: Verbum divinum, fons sapientiae
- Motto in English: The word of God is the fount of knowledge
- Type: Seminary
- Established: 1933; 93 years ago; Transferred to Tagaytay in 1963
- Religious affiliation: Roman Catholic; Society of the Divine Word
- Academic affiliations: Pontifical Urbaniana University, DWEA, CEAP
- Rector: Fr. SherwinTristan Aromin, SVD
- Dean: Fr. Dante Barril, SVD
- Academic staff: 22 (12 Resident Professors)
- Students: 242 (SY 2016 - 2017)
- Location: SVD Road, Tagaytay City, Philippines; 14°07′38″N 120°57′57″E
- Campus: Urban
- Colors: Blue
- Website: dwst-tagaytay.com
- Location within Luzon Location within Philippines

The Divine Word Seminary Tagaytay (DWST) is a Roman Catholic mission seminary located in Tagaytay City, Philippines. Established in 1933, the seminary is owned and administered by the Society of the Divine Word (Latin: Societas Verbi Divini, or SVD). The primary purpose of the seminary is to prepare missionaries for both the Philippine and foreign missions. Its students are mostly seminarians preparing for the priesthood, and come from a cluster of around 14 autonomous affiliated houses of formation.

== History ==
In 1933, the Divine Word Missionaries, with the assistance of Tuguegarao Bishop Constant Jurgens, established the Christ the King Mission Seminary in España Extension (now E.Rodriguez Avenue). The eventual growth of the seminary population prompted the SVD Fathers in the 1950s to plan for the acquisition of a property in Tagaytay City. This was further reinforced by the instructions of Father General Alois Grosse-Kappenberg to separate their minor and the major seminaries located in Quezon City.

During the 1957 Provincial Chapter, it was resolved that the Major Department shall leave the Christ the King Mission Seminary. It was also resolved that the Major Department shall relocate near Manila, although Provincial Superior Fr. Franz Kutscher preferred to transfer the major seminary to Tagaytay because of its mild climate. The SVD Fathers, who previously acquired a 65-hectare property in Alfonso, Cavite, sold it and bought a property in Tagaytay in 1962. Eventually, during the 1963 Provincial Chapter presided by Superior General Johannes Schutte, the SVD scholasticate and the novitiate shall be the ones who will transfer to Tagaytay. The SVD Theologate shall remain in Quezon City.

On September 12, 1963, the first occupants of the Divine Word Seminary arrived in Tagaytay. They were composed of two professed brothers, 12 brother-novices, the Novice Master, and the Procurator. Two months later, they were followed by 44 clerical-novices accompanied by Frs. Vicente Braganza and Joseph Bette. The following year, Fr. Alois Lehberger, SVD was appointed as the first Seminary Rector with Fr. Alphonse Mildner, SVD serving as the Novice Master. In June 1964, it was decided that the entire SVD Scholasticate shall transfer to Tagaytay, which happened a month after. The seminary offered a government-recognized degrees of Bachelor and Master of Arts in Philosophy, while the theologians availed the four-year ecclesiastical course in theology.

The seminary population grew further because of the enrollment of seminarians from other congregations. In 1966, seminarians from the Capuchins joined the SVD classes, followed by the Franciscans and major seminarians from the Apostolic Vicariate of Calapan in 1968. The Franciscans and the SVD Fathers have planned to establish a common seminary, but it did not push through. Meanwhile, Calapan Apostolic Vicar and SVD member Wilhelm Duschak established their Saint Augustine Major Seminary nearby and affiliated it with DWST. This was followed by other neighboring formation houses. In 1967, the Pope John XXIII Training Center was inaugurated by Imus Bishop Artemio Casas and Federation of Free Farmers co-founder Jeremias Montemayor. This became the center of the scholastics' involvement in social action.

By School Year 1976-1977, the Master of Arts in Theology was offered by the seminary. A year after, the Rector Magnificus of the Pontifical Urban University visited the seminary for the affiliation of its theology program, which took effect in 1982 under the auspices of the Congregation for Catholic Education. This enabled the seminary to offer the Baccalaureate in Sacred Theology for its students. In 2005, the seminary started to offer a government-recognized Bachelor of Arts in Theology, and started to accept lay students and consecrated persons to its theological school. As its incorporation was renewed by the Securities and Exchange Commission, it is now known in its new name, the Divine Word Seminary Tagaytay.

== Academic programs ==
DWST offers the following degrees:

1. a four-year Theology course;
2. Sacrae Theologiae Baccalaureus or S.T.B. – diploma comes from Pontifical Urbaniana University in Rome;
3. M. A. in Theology;
4. A.B. in Theology; and
5. Certificate in Theological Studies directed mainly to the laity.

DWST also hosts a house of formation for the SVD-Philippines—the SVD Arnold Janssen Formation Center and the Divine Word Institute of Mission Studies (DWIMS).

Included in its academic programs are the following courses/subjects:

1. Ecclesiastical Course (course for candidates for the priesthood)
2. Licentiate in Mission Theology (run by the Divine Word Institute of Mission Studies)
3. Baccalaureate in Sacred Theology (degree conferred by the Pontifical Urbaniana University, Rome)
4. AB Theology Degree (recognized by CHED)
5. M.A. in Theology, Major in Moral Theology
6. M.A. in Theology, Major in Missiology
7. M.A. in Theology, Major in Sacred Scriptures
8. M.A. in Theology Major in Systematic Theology
9. M. A. in Theology: Major in Pastoral Ministry (non-thesis)
10. M. A. in Theology Major in Mission Studies (Non-thesis)
11. Certificate in Theological Studies (CTS)
12. SVD-Alternative Learning System (SVD-ALS)

== Administration ==
Rectors of the
Divine Word Seminary
Fr. Alois Lehberger, SVD, 1964–1969
Fr. Wenceslao Fernan, SVD, 1965–1966
Fr. Amante Castillo, SVD, 1968–1970
Msgr. Miguel Cinches, SVD, 1970–1973
Fr. Florante Camacho, SVD, 1973–1974
Fr. Herminio Ricafort, SVD, 1974–1979
Fr. Antolin Uy, SVD, 1979–1987
Fr. Herman Mueller, SVD, 1979–1980
Fr. Florencio Lagura, SVD, 1987–1990
Fr. Robert Orig, SVD, 1990–1993
Fr. Herbert Scholz, SVD, 1993–1995
Fr. Lino Nicasio, SVD, 1995–1996
Fr. Dionisio Miranda, SVD, 1996–1999
Fr. Antolin Uy, SVD, 1999–2002
Fr. Joseph Miras, SVD, 2002–2005
Fr. Wilfredo Saniel, SVD, 2005 – 2014
Fr. Michael Layugan SVD, 2014 – 2020
Fr. Samuel Agcaracar, SVD, 2020–2025
Fr. Severo Biton, Jr. SVD, 2025 - 2026
Fr. Sherwin Tristan Aromin, SVD, 2026 - Present

=== Affiliated houses of formation ===
1. Arnold Janssen Formation Center (SVD) - Rector, Fr. Sherwin Tristan Aromin SVD
2. Mission Society of the Philippines (MSP) - Rector, Fr. Reginaldo Lavilla, MSP
3. Missionaries of St. Francis de Sales (MSFS)- Rector, Fr. Anishmon Kamukuthottathil, MSFS
4. Oblates of Saint Joseph House of the Junior Professed (OSJ) - Rector, Fr. Edwin Tolentino, OSJ
5. Religious Tertiary Capuchins of Our Lady of Sorrows (Amigonians) - Rector, Fr. Ildefonso Diente, TC
6. Saint Augustine Major Seminary (SASMA)- Rector, Fr. Simplicio Bonquin
7. Saint Lawrence of Brindisi House of Studies (OFM Capuchins) - Rector, Fr. Michael Angelo Flores, OFMCap
8. Saint Paul Seminary Foundation (SSP)- Rector, Fr. Norman Melchor Peña Jr., SSP
9. San Pablo Theological Formation House - Rector, Fr. Edwin Lusterio
10. Servants of the Paraclete (sP)- Rector, Fr. Peter Khan, sP
11. Somascan Major Seminary (Somascans)- Rector, Fr. Gabriele Scotti, CRS
12. Tahanan ng Mabuting Pastol (TMP) - Rector, Fr. Michael Cron
13. Two Hearts (OATH and SMITH) - Rector, Fr. Jeremy Abon, OATH
14. Fraternidad Misionera Verbum Dei (FMVD) - Superior, Sr. Lorna Mendoza, FMVD
15. Franciscan Missionaries of Mary (FMM) - Superior, Sr. Josephine Buencamino, FMM

=== Deans ===
The School of Theology had graduates already from the school years 1964–1969, but there was no official appointment of a dean for the school. The school's entity was closely associated with the rector, thus there was no official appointment for a dean until the start of the school-year 1969.

- Fr. Dante Barril, SVD, STL 2024-Present
- Fr. Michael G. Layugan, SVD, PhD, SThD 2023-2024
- Fr. Antonio Pernia, SVD, STD 2020–2023
- Fr. Guilberto Marqueses, SVD, STL 2017-2020
- Fr. Randolf Flores, SVD, SSL, PhD and STD – 2014–2017
- Fr. Felix Ferrer, SVD, STD – 2013–2014
- Fr. Alexander Muaña, SVD, STL – 2008–2013
- Fr. Michael Layugan, SVD, PhD and STD – 2004–2008
- Fr. Felix Ferrer, SVD, STD- 1999–2004
- Fr. Lino Nicasio, SVD, PhD – 1996–1999
- Fr. Antolin Uy, SVD, PhD – 1995–1996
- Fr. Lino Nicasio, SVD, PhD – 1992–1995
- Fr. Guillermo Villegas, SVD, SSL, STD – 1990–1992
- Fr. Constante Floresca, SVD, MA – 1988
- Fr. Antolin Uy, SVD, PhD – 1987–1990
- Fr. Florencio Lagura, SVD, STD – 1985–1987
- Fr. Herbert Scholz, SVD, STD – 1981–1985
- Fr. Reiner Franke, SVD, SSL – 1975–1981
- Fr. Macario Magboo, SVD, STL – 1972–1975
- Fr. Frederick Scharpf, SVD, SSL – 1969–1972
