= Lupao =

Municipality in Nueva Ecija, Philippines

- Municipality
- Municipality of Lupao
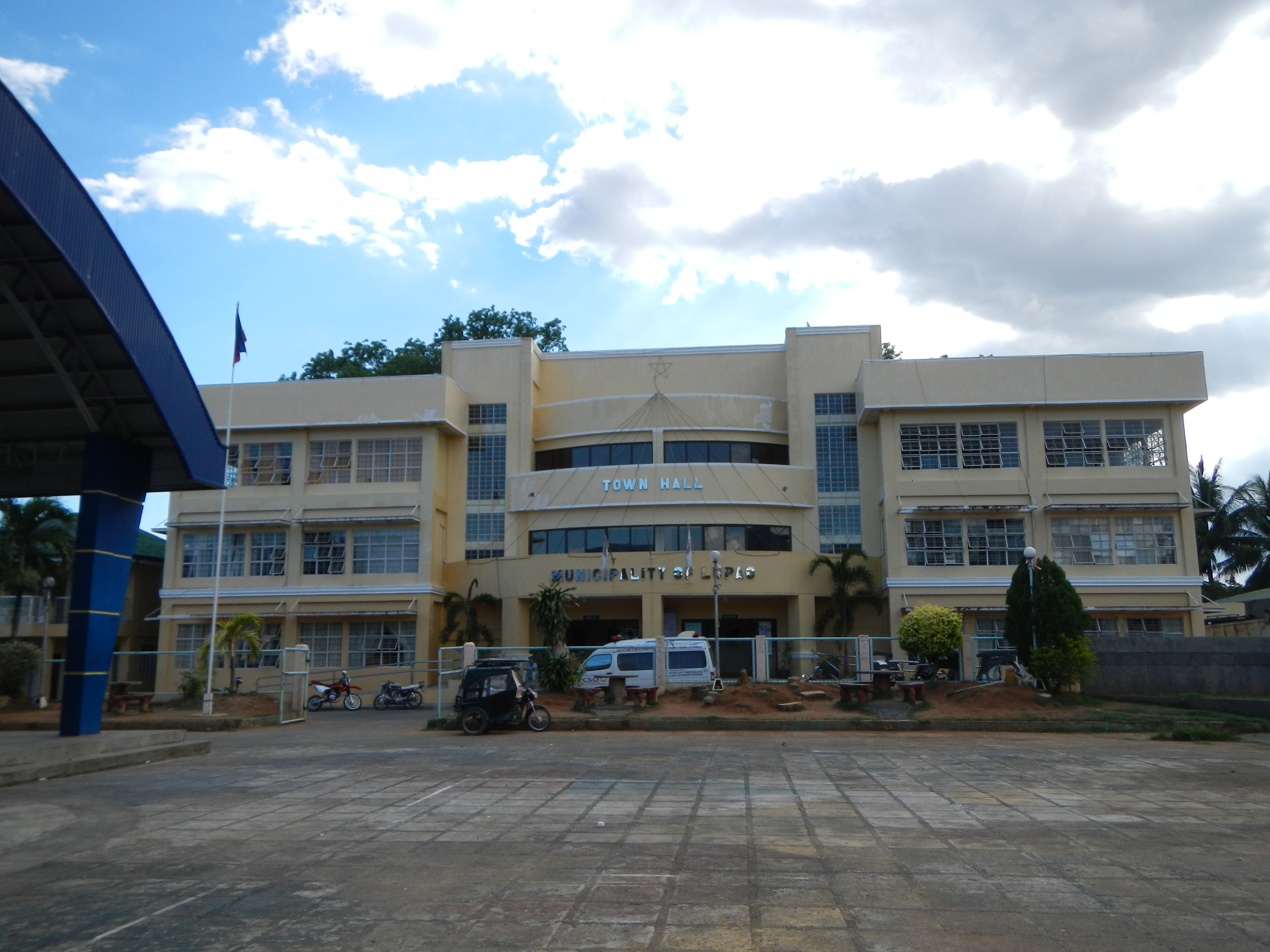
- Municipal hall

- Seal

- Map of Nueva Ecija with Lupao highlighted
- Interactive map of Lupao
- Location within the Philippines
- Coordinates: 15°52′46″N 120°53′58″E
- Country: Philippines
- Region: Central Luzon
- Province: Nueva Ecija
- District: 2nd district
- Founded: 1913
- Barangays: 24 (see Barangays)

Government
  - Type: Sangguniang Bayan
  - Mayor: Alex Rommel V. Romano
  - Vice Mayor: Glenda P. Romano
  - Representative: Micaela S. Violago
  - Municipal Council: Members: Ruben Agliam; Jhovy Casta; Jano Bascos; Jacinto Licay; Richard Ramos; Janiece Esebido; Rocky Gattoc
  - Electorate: 31,160 voters (2025)

Area
  - Total: 121.33 km^{2} (46.85 sq mi)
- Elevation: 169 m (554 ft)
- Highest elevation: 838 m (2,749 ft)
- Lowest elevation: 89 m (292 ft)

Population (2024 census)
  - Total: 47,175
  - Density: 388.82/km^{2} (1,007.0/sq mi)
  - Households: 11,519

Economy
  - Income class: 2nd municipal income class
  - Poverty incidence: 13.05% (2023)
  - Revenue: ₱ 210.9 million (2024)
  - Assets: ₱ 425.8 million (2024)
  - Expenditure: ₱ 199.2 million (2024)
  - Liabilities: ₱ 225.7 million (2024)

Service provider
  - Electricity: Nueva Ecija 2 Area 1 Electric Cooperative (NEECO 2 A1)
  - Water: Pamana Water Corporation
- Time zone: UTC+8 (PST)
- ZIP code: 3122
- PSGC: 0304916000
- IDD : area code: +63 (0)44
- Native languages: Ilocano; Tagalog
- Feast date: 6 April
- Patron saint: St. James the Great
- Website: www.lupao.net

Lupao, officially the Municipality of Lupao (Ilocano: Ili ti Lupao; Pangasinan: Baley na Lupao;Tagalog: Bayan ng Lupao), is a municipality in the province of Nueva Ecija, Philippines. According to the 2024 census, it has a population of 47,175 people.

Lupao is 58 kilometres (36 mi) from Cabanatuan, 72 kilometres (45 mi) from Palayan, and 174 kilometres (108 mi) from Manila. Its name is derived from the Ilocano word lupa, the name of an itchy plant found in great abundance in the area at the time of the town's foundation in 1913.

== History ==
During Spanish rule, the territorial jurisdiction of the province of Nueva Ecija extended to as far south at Cabiao and the towns of San Quintin, Rosales, Balungao and (H)umingan in the north, which later on formed part of the province of Pangasinan. Lupao was a component barrio of Umingan. It remained so until 1871 when some residents led by a Señor Calderon petitioned the Governor General for the segregation of Lupao as a barrio of Umingan and the eventual creation of Lupao as “Tenencia Absoluta” to be headed by a Teniente Absoluto. On September 28, 1871, the Govierno Superior Civil de Filipinas decreed the creation of Lupao as Tenencia Absoluta. It signified the formal segregation as barrio and the eventual creation as a pueblo of the province of Nueva Ecija.

Salvacion was the first barrio of Lupao. Its initial territory also included Barrio Cabaritan, now known as San Jose City. Barangay San Roque was known as Odiao and San Isidro as Macaniaoed. Among the first leaders of the municipality during the final years of Spanish Rule were Benito Romualdo as “Capitan Municipal” and Celestino Jabalde as ‘Juez de Paz”.

In 1913, Lupao became a municipality through the concerted efforts of Gen. Manuel Tinio and Assemblyman Isauro Gabaldon of the Philippine Assembly. Its founding fathers were Victoriano Joanino, Calixto Laureta, Felix Carpio, Juan Briones, Anacleto Ganareal, Luis Mamaligsa, Gregorio Babagay, Sicto Baclig, Remigio Blas Caoile and Candido Mata.

During the Second World War, Japanese Imperial forces occupied the town in 1942. In 1945, the combined U.S. and Philippine Commonwealth military ground troops liberated Lupao and defeated the Japanese Imperial forces during the Battle of Lupao. The main headquarters of the Philippine Commonwealth Army and United States Army was established in Lupao.

=== Lupao Massacre ===
During a military operation against the New People's Army on February 10, 1987, seventeen civilians, including an elderly couple and six children, were murdered by the Alpha Company, 14th Infantry (Avengers) Battalion, of the Philippine Army. The murders were carried out by the 14th Infantry after they failed to capture the NPA who had killed platoon leader Second Lieutenant Edgar Dizon, in an ambush the night before. In an act of frustration and anger, the 14th Infantry gathered up unarmed civilians hiding in the rice paddies and murdered them with gunfire and bayonets, leaving 17 dead and 8 wounded, claiming that the dead were rebels. All 24 soldiers of the 14th Infantry Battalion were eventually tried before court-martial but were all acquitted, despite first-hand testimonies of the survivors. This became known as the "Lupao Massacre."

On September 25, 2005, three NPA members were killed by soldiers of the 71st Infantry Battalion during a hot pursuit operation against the rebels in Barangay Cordero, Lupao.

== Geography ==
=== Barangays ===
Lupao is subdivided into 24 barangays, as shown below. Each barangay consists of puroks and some have sitios.

- Agupalo Este
- Agupalo Weste
- Alalay Chica
- Alalay Grande
- Barangay J.U.Tienzo
- Bagong Flores
- Balbalungao
- Burgos
- Cordero
- Mapangpang
- Namulandayan
- Parista
- Poblacion East
- Poblacion North
- Poblacion South
- Poblacion West
- Salvacion I
- Salvacion II
- San Antonio Este
- San Antonio Weste
- San Isidro
- San Pedro
- San Roque
- Santo Domingo

=== Climate ===
Climate data for Lupao, Nueva Ecija
Month	Jan	Feb	Mar	Apr	May	Jun	Jul	Aug	Sep	Oct	Nov	Dec	Year
Mean daily maximum °C (°F)	29 (84)	30 (86)	31 (88)	33 (91)	32 (90)	31 (88)	29 (84)	29 (84)	29 (84)	30 (86)	30 (86)	29 (84)	30 (86)
Mean daily minimum °C (°F)	19 (66)	19 (66)	20 (68)	22 (72)	24 (75)	24 (75)	24 (75)	24 (75)	24 (75)	22 (72)	21 (70)	20 (68)	22 (71)
Average precipitation mm (inches)	13 (0.5)	15 (0.6)	21 (0.8)	33 (1.3)	92 (3.6)	121 (4.8)	142 (5.6)	124 (4.9)	121 (4.8)	143 (5.6)	50 (2.0)	22 (0.9)	897 (35.4)
Average rainy days	6.0	6.4	9.2	12.2	20.3	23.1	25.1	22.5	22.4	20.0	11.6	7.1	185.9
Source: Meteoblue

Lupao belongs to the first type of climate in the Philippines. This type of climate has two (2) pronounced seasons: dry from the month of November to April and Wet during the rest of the year. This type of climate is typically hot, humid and tropical and is generally affected by the neighboring topography and the prevalent wind direction that varies within the year.

== Demographics ==
Population census of Lupao

Year	Pop.	±% p.a.
1903	541	—
1918	5,801	+17.14%
1939	11,783	+3.43%
1948	13,410	+1.45%
1960	15,482	+1.20%
1970	20,005	+2.59%
1975	22,106	+2.02%
1980	23,050	+0.84%

Year	Pop.	±% p.a.
1990	27,481	+1.77%
1995	29,996	+1.65%
2000	34,190	+2.85%
2007	36,832	+1.03%
2010	40,931	+3.91%
2015	43,788	+1.29%
2020	45,917	+1.00%
2024	47,175	+0.65%

Source: Philippine Statistics Authority

Residents in Lupao are called "Lupaoenian". Population is predominantly Ilocano in origin, according to the 2024 census, Lupao had a population of 47,175 people, 80% Ilocano and 20% Tagalogs, Kapampangans, and Pangasinans.

=== Languages ===
Ilocano, Pangasinan, and Tagalog are the dominant languages in Lupao.

== Economy ==
Poverty incidence of Lupao (%)

Source: Philippine Statistics Authority

== Tourism ==
=== Landmarks ===
- Macanae Dam
- Macarina Resort
- Pinsal Falls

=== Local delicacies ===
Due to its history and cultural background, Lupaoenian cuisine is greatly influenced by the Ilocanos and Pangasinenses. Rice is a staple food. Bangus, bagoong and alamang from Dagupan. Tinapa or smoked fish is also a famous dish which was commonly made locally in Ubbog. Locals also love their vegetables such as diningdeng- a concoction of vegetables & fish sauce; and boiled kamote tops. Goat "kalding" is a common treat for all occasions. It is a common ingredient on dishes such as pinapaitan, kilawin & adobo.

The locals are also fond of sweets like tinudok, espasol, puto, tambutambong, tupig, kalamay, ginataang bayabas and ingkiwar. Exotic food such as "Tapang usa" or venison, "Baboy-ramo" or wild hog meat, Abu-os "ant egg" were predominantly catered from Namulandayan until the late 1980s, which eventually led to the probable extinction of local deer and hogs in the mountainside.

== Education ==
The Lupao Schools District Office governs all educational institutions within the municipality. It oversees the management and operations of all private and public, from primary to secondary schools.

=== Primary and elementary schools ===
- Agupalo Este Elementary School
- Agupalo Weste Elementary School
- Alalay Chica Elementary School
- Alalay Grande Elementary School
- Arimal Elementary School
- Bagong Flores Elementary School
- Balbalungao Elementary School
- Burgos Elementary School
- Cordero Elementary School
- Lupao Central School
- Luisa Madrid Methodist School
- Mapangpang Elementary School
- Namulandayan Elementary School
- Parista Elementary School
- Sacred Heart Academy
- Salvacion 1st Elementary School
- Salvacion 2nd Elementary School
- San Antonio Este Elementary School
- San Antonio Weste Elementary School
- San Isidro Elementary School
- San Pedro Elementary School
- San Roque Elementary School
- Sto. Domingo Elementary School

=== Secondary schools ===
- Agupalo Weste High School
- Doña Juana Chioco National High School
- Sacred Heart Academy
- San Isidro National High School
