= Historical list of the Catholic bishops of the Philippines =

This is a historical list of all bishops of the Catholic Church whose sees were within the present-day boundaries of the Philippines, with links to the bishops who consecrated them. The list covers from the establishment of the Diocese of Manila in 1579 up until the present.

The list is arranged according to the date of their consecration/ordination to the episcopate. For cases of bishops who governed a foreign diocese before their assignment to the Philippines, they are arranged according to the date when they are transferred to a diocese within the country, with the date of their consecration in parentheses. Non-numbered names are priests who were appointed as bishop but were not able to receive episcopal consecration due to certain reasons, however they are considered as part of the episcopal list of their respective dioceses by virtue of their appointment. "Diocese" refers to the diocese over which the bishop presided or, if he did not preside, the diocese in which he served as coadjutor bishop or auxiliary bishop. The Roman numeral before the diocese name represents where in the sequence that bishop falls; e.g., the fourth bishop of Manila is written "IV Manila". Where a diocese is in bold type it indicates that the bishop is the current bishop of that diocese. Titular sees are not listed. Under consecrators are the numbers (or letters) referencing previous bishops on the list. The number listed first represents the principal consecrator. If a series of letters is under "Consecrators", then the consecrators were bishops from outside the Philippines (the list of foreign sees is at the bottom of the page). Where the letter "F" is used, it indicates that a priest who was not a bishop assisted in the consecration.

== Chart of episcopal succession ==
- (#) Venerable
- (¤) Servant of God
- (*) Cardinal
- (‡) Current Diocesan bishop/Archbishop
- (&) Current Coadjutor bishop
- Current Auxiliary bishop
- (°) Nuncio to the Philippines
- (") Apostolic Delegate to the United States

=== Spanish era (1581-1897) ===
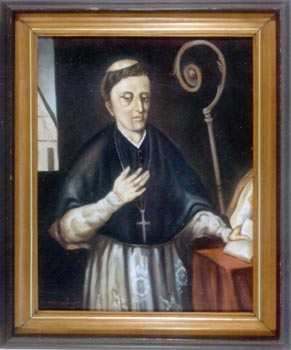
Domingo de Salazar (1) was the first bishop of the Diocese of Manila.

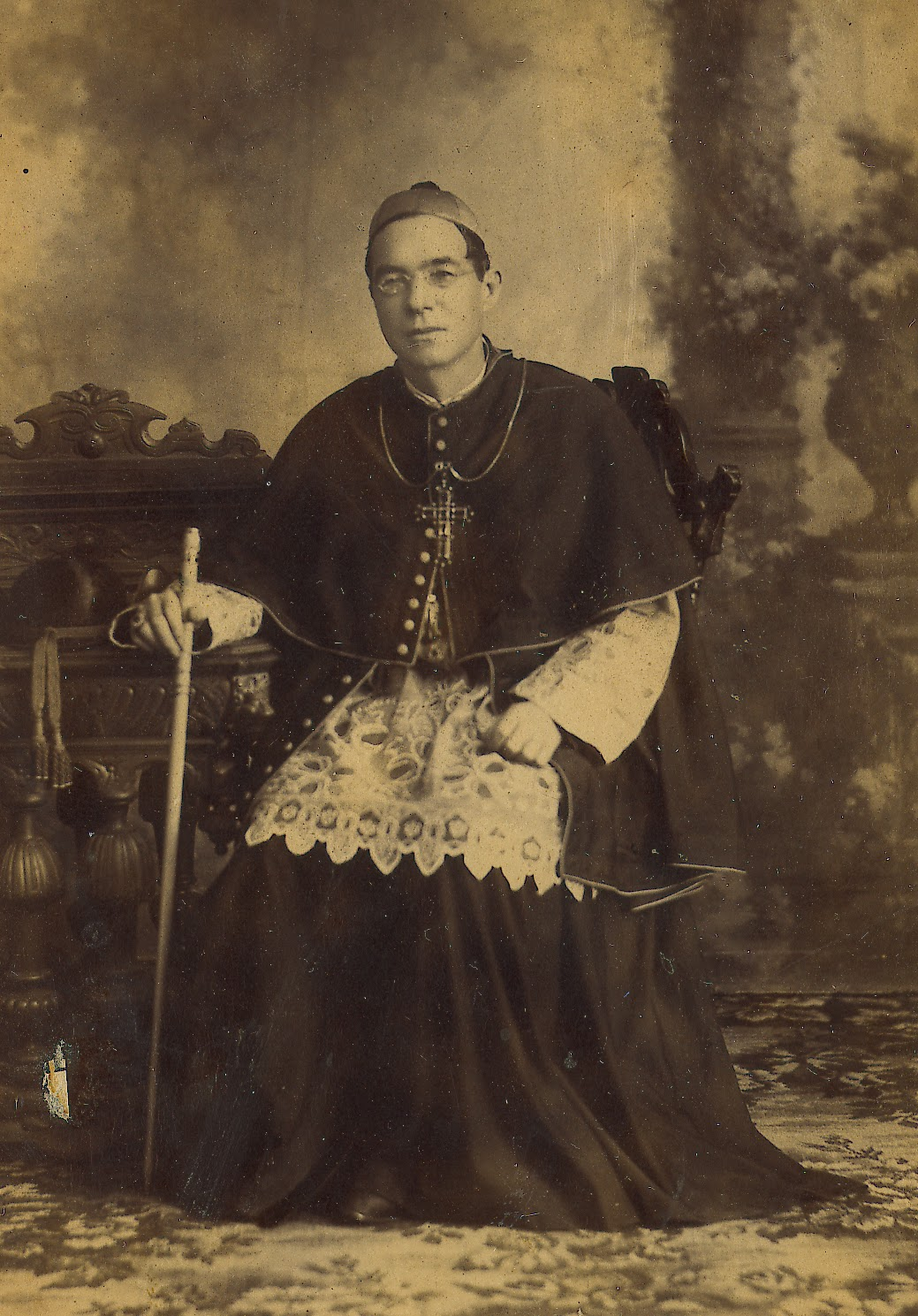
Andrés Ferrero y Malo (80), Bishop of Jaro, was the last Spanish bishop to leave the Philippines in 1903.

No.	Picture	Bishop	Consecrators	Year	Diocese	Coat of arms	Ref
1		Domingo Salazar	??	1581	I Manila		
-		Luis Maldonado (Note: Died before receiving episcopal consecration.)	-	1595 (Note: Date of appointment)	I Nueva Cáceres (Note: Later renamed Cáceres) (elect)		
2		Pedro de Agurto	AA1 (Note: Although three bishops are typically required for ordination, the Pope may issue a dispensation when co-consecrators are unavailable. See Canon 1014.)	1597	I Cebu		
3		Ignacio Santibáñez	AA1	1597	II Manila		
4		Miguel de Benavides	??	1597	I Nueva Segovia, III Manila		
5		Francisco Ortega	??	1600	II Nueva Cáceres		
6		Baltazar de Cobarrubias y Múñoz (Note: Also #40 in the Mexican historical succession of bishops.)	AA1	1603	III Nueva Cáceres		
7		Diego Soria	??	1603	II Nueva Segovia		
-		Pedro de Godinez	-	1605	IV Nueva Cáceres (elect)		
8		Diego Vázquez de Mercado (Note: Also #38 in the Mexican historical succession of bishops.)	AB1	1608 (1604)	IV Manila		
-		Pedro Matías	-	1612	V Nueva Cáceres (elect)		
9		Pedro de Arce	8	1613	II Cebu		
10		Diego Guevara	AC1	1616	VI Nueva Cáceres		
11		Miguel García Serrano	AB2	1617	III Nueva Segovia, V Manila		
12		Juan Rentería	??	1618	IV Nueva Segovia		
13		Luis de Cañizares	AB2	1627	VII Nueva Cáceres		
14		Hernando Guerrero	9	1628	V Nueva Segovia, VI Manila		
15		Francisco de Zamudio y Avendaño	??	1629	VIII Nueva Cáceres		
16		Diego Aduarte	14	1635	VI Nueva Segovia		
17		Fernando Montero Espinosa	AA2	1640	VII Nueva Segovia, VII Manila		
-		Nicolás de Zaldívar y Zapata	-	1644	IX Nueva Cáceres (elect)		
18		Miguel de Poblete Casasola	AB3	1650	VIII Manila		
19		Rodrigo de Cárdenas	18 F1	1651	VIII Nueva Segovia		
-		Antonio de San Gregorio	-	1659	X Nueva Cáceres (elect)		
-		Juan Vélez	-	1660	III Cebu (elect)		
20		Juan López Galván	AD1	1665	IV Cebu, IX Manila		
-		Jose Millan de Poblete	-	1675	IX Nueva Segovia (elect)		
21		Diego de Aguilar	AB4	1677	V Cebu		
22		Juan Durán	AB4 F2 F3	1681	Cebu (auxiliary)		
23		Francisco Pizaro de Orellana	??	1681	X Nueva Segovia		
24		Ginés Barrientos	AA3 F4 F5	1681	Manila (auxiliary)		
25		Felipe Fernandez de Pardo	21 24 F(26)	1681	X Manila		
26		Andrés González	25 21 24	1686	XI Nueva Cáceres		
27		Diego Camacho y Ávila (Note: Also #108 in the Mexican historical succession of bishops.)	AA3	1696	XI Manila		
28		Miguel Bayot	27 F6	1699	VI Cebu		
29		Diego de Gorospe y Irala	AD2	1702	XI Nueva Segovia		
30		Francisco de la Cuesta (Note: Also #120 in the Mexican historical succession of bishops.)	AB5	1706	XII Manila		
31		Pedro Sanz de la Vega y Landaverde	AB6	1716	VII Cebu		
-		Pedro Mejorada	-	1717	XII Nueva Segovia (elect)		
-		Domingo de Valencia	-	1718	XII Nueva Cáceres (elect)		
32		Carlos Bermudez de Castro	AB6 F8 F9	1725	XIII Manila		
33		Felipe Molina y Figueroa	AE1 F(38) F(37)	1726	XIII Nueva Cáceres		
34		Jeronimo Herrera y Lopez	33	1727	XIII Nueva Segovia		
35		Manuel de Ocio y Campo	34	1735	VIII Cebu		
36		Juan Angel Rodríguez	33 F(41) F(37)	1736	XIV Manila		
37		Isidro de Arevalo	AF1	1743	XIV Nueva Cáceres		
-		Manuel del Rio Flores	-	1744	XIV Nueva Segovia (elect)		
38		Protacio Cabezas	37 F(41) F10	1744	IX Cebu		
39		Pedro José Manuel Martínez de Arizala	AG1 F11 F12	1745	XV Manila		
-		Juan de Arechederra	-	1750	XV Nueva Segovia (elect)		
40		Manuel de Matos	AB7 AH1 F13	1754	XV Nueva Cáceres		
41		Juan de La Fuente Yepes	40	1755	XVI Nueva Segovia		
42		Manuel Antonio Rojo del Rio Lafuente y Veiyra	AB7	1758	XVI Manila		
43		Miguel Lino de Ezpeleta	42	1759	X Cebu		
-		Bernardo de Ustáriz	-	1763	XVII Nueva Segovia (elect)		
44		Basilio Tomás Sancho y Hernando (de Santas Justa y Rufina)	AI1 AJ1 AK1	1766	XVII Manila		
45		Miguel García San Esteban	44 F14 F15	1769	XVIII Nueva Segovia		
46		Antonio de Luna	44 F14 F16	1770	XVI Nueva Cáceres		
-		Andres de Echeandía	-	1775	XVII Nueva Cáceres (elect)		
47		Mateo Joaquin Rubio de Arevalo	44	1776	XI Cebu		
-		Francisco de Maceira		1777	XVIII Nueva Cáceres (elect)		
48		Juan Antonio Gallego y Orbigo	44	1779	XIX Nueva Cáceres, XVIII Manila		
49		Juan García Ruiz	48	1786	XIX Nueva Segovia		
50		Domingo Collantes	48 F17 F18	1790	XX Nueva Cáceres		
51		Ignacio de Salamanca	48 50 F19	1794	XII Cebu		
52		Agustín Pedro Blaquier	50 F19 F18	1803	XX Nueva Segovia		
53		Juan Antonio Zulaibar y Aldape	50 F18 F20	1805	XIX Manila		
54		Joaquín Encabo de la Virgen de Sopetrán	53	1808	XIII Cebu		
55		Cayetano Pallás	53	1808	XXI Nueva Segovia		
56		Bernardo García y Hernández (Fernandez Perdigon)	53	1817	XXI Nueva Cáceres		
57		Francisco Albán Barreiro	53 F21 F22	1818	XXII Nueva Segovia		
58		Francisco Genovés	57	1826	XIV Cebu		
59		Hilarión Diéz Fernández	57	1827	XX Manila		
60		Juan Antonio Lillo	57	1829	Nueva Cáceres (auxiliary), XXII Nueva Cáceres		
61		Santos Gómez Marañón	60	1830	XV Cebu		
62		José Maria Seguí Molas	60	1830	Manila (auxiliary), XXI Manila		
63		Romualdo Jimeno Ballesteros	AL1 F23	1845 (1841)	Manila (coadjutor), XVI Cebu		
-		Rafael Masoliver	-	1846	XXIII Nueva Segovia (elect)		
64		José Julián Aranguren	63	1847	XXII Manila		
65		Vicente Barreiro y Pérez	64	1849	Nueva Cáceres (elect), XXIV Nueva Segovia		
66		Manuel Grijalvo y Mínguez	64	1849	XXIII Nueva Cáceres		
67		Gregorio Melitón Martínez Santa Cruz	AM1 AN1 AO1	1862	XXIII Manila		
68		Francisco Gainza Escobás	67 63 AP1	1863	XXIV Nueva Cáceres		
69		Juan José Aragonés	67 63 68	1865	XXV Nueva Segovia		
70		Mariano Cuartero y Medina	AQ1 AR1 68	1867	I Jaro		
71		Mariano Cuartero y Sierra	70	1875	XXVI Nueva Segovia		
72		Pedro Payo y Piñeiro	AS1 AR2 AT1	1876	XXIV Manila		
73		Benito Romero de Madridejos	72 68 70	1876	XVII Cebu		
74		Casimiro Herrero y Pérez	72 70 73	1881	XXV Nueva Cáceres		
75		Leandro Arrúe Agudo	72 71 AU1	1885	II Jaro		
76		Martín García y Alcocer	AV1 AW1 AX1	1886	XVIII Cebu		
77		Arsenio del Campo y Monasterio	AY1 AZ1 BA1	1888	XXVI Nueva Cáceres		
78		José Hevía y Campomanes	BB1 BC1 BD1	1890	XXVII Nueva Segovia		
79		Bernardino Nozaleda y Villa	BB1 BC1 BD1	1890	XXV Manila		
80		Andrés Ferrero Malo	79 AU1	1898	III Jaro		

=== American era and World War II (1898-1945) ===
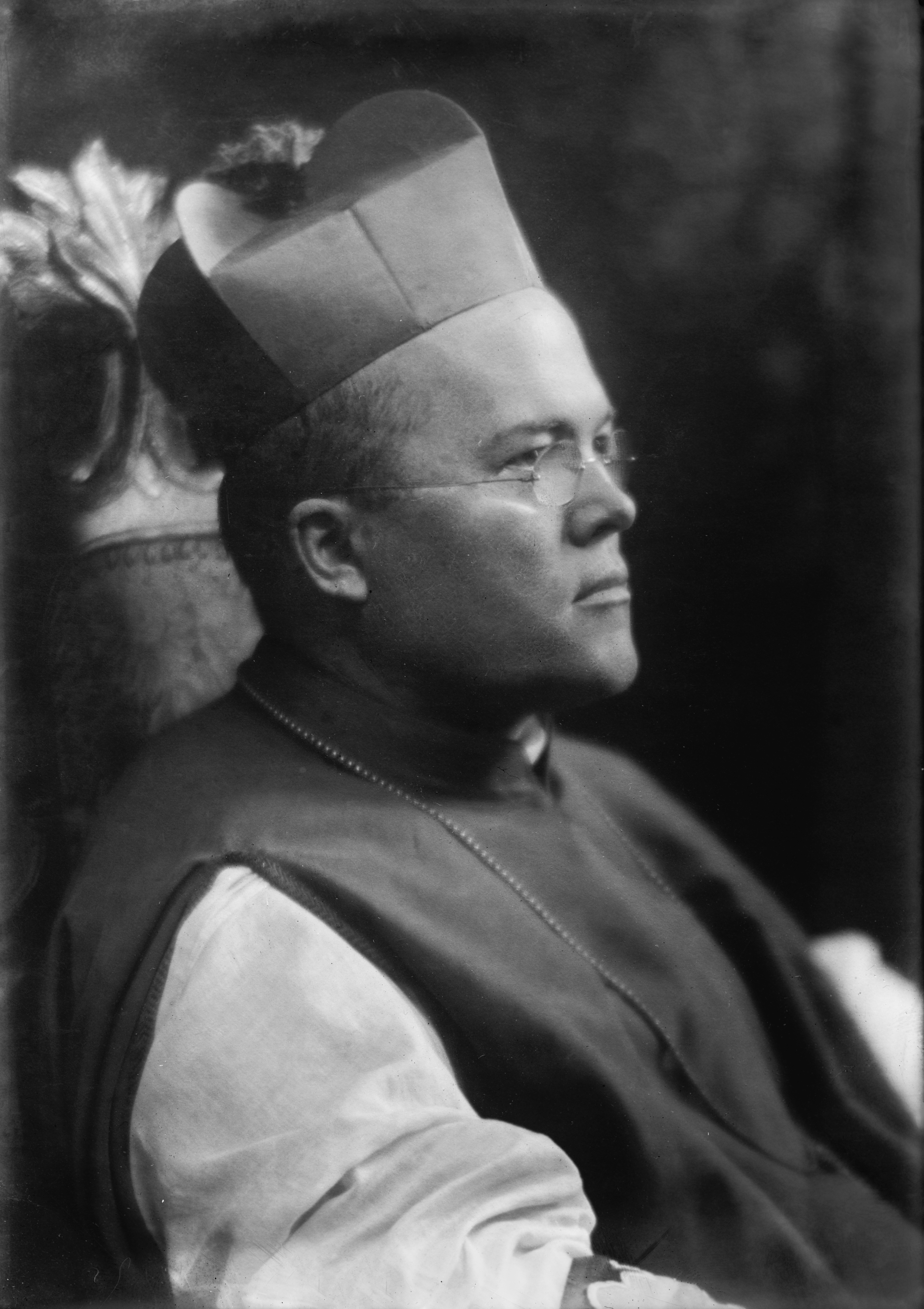
Dennis Joseph Dougherty (81) was the first American bishop to be assigned to the Philippines. He was later made a cardinal in 1921 after he returned to the United States.

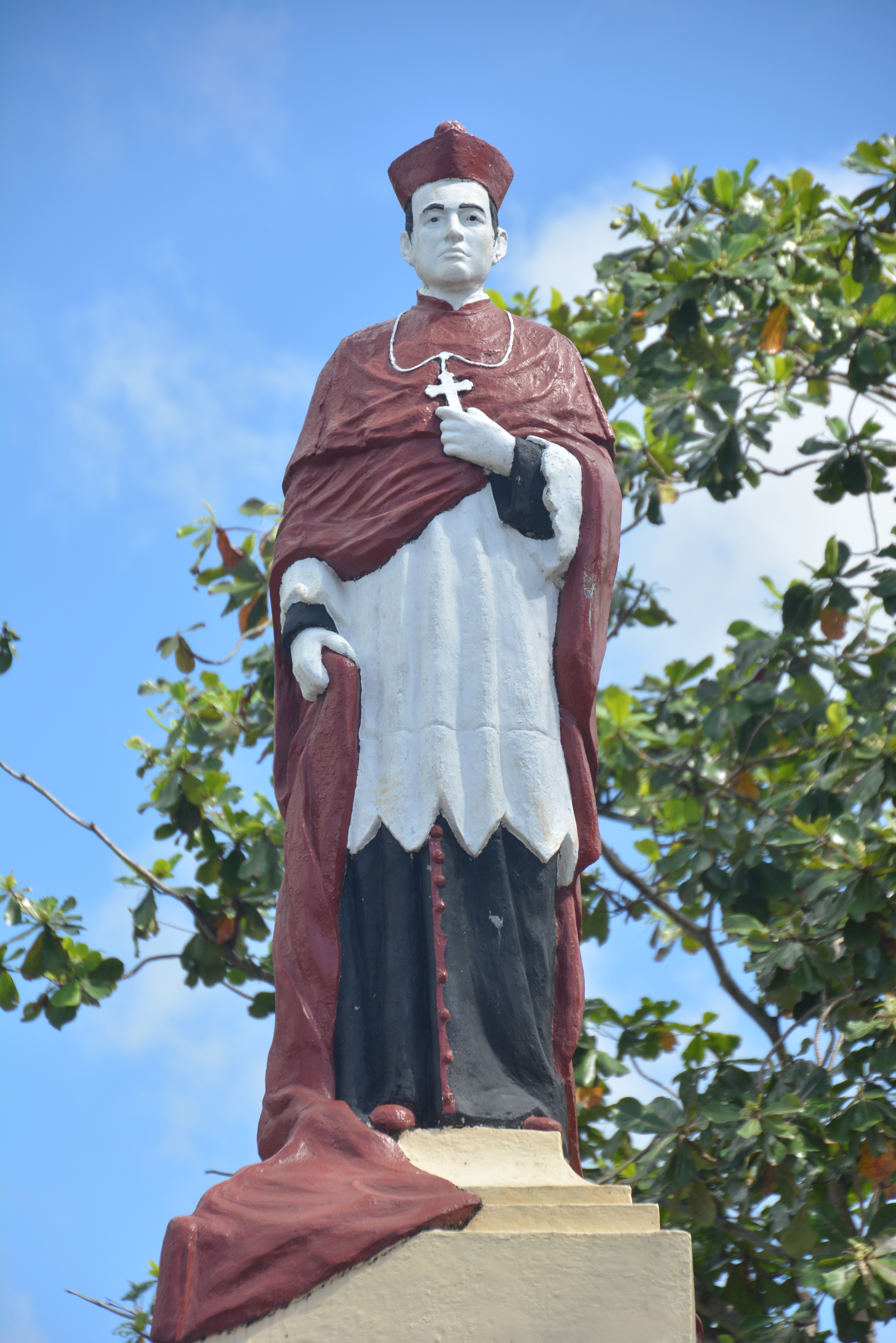
Jorge Barlin (85) became the first Filipino bishop in 1906. He died in 1909 in Rome, Italy during an ad limina visit.

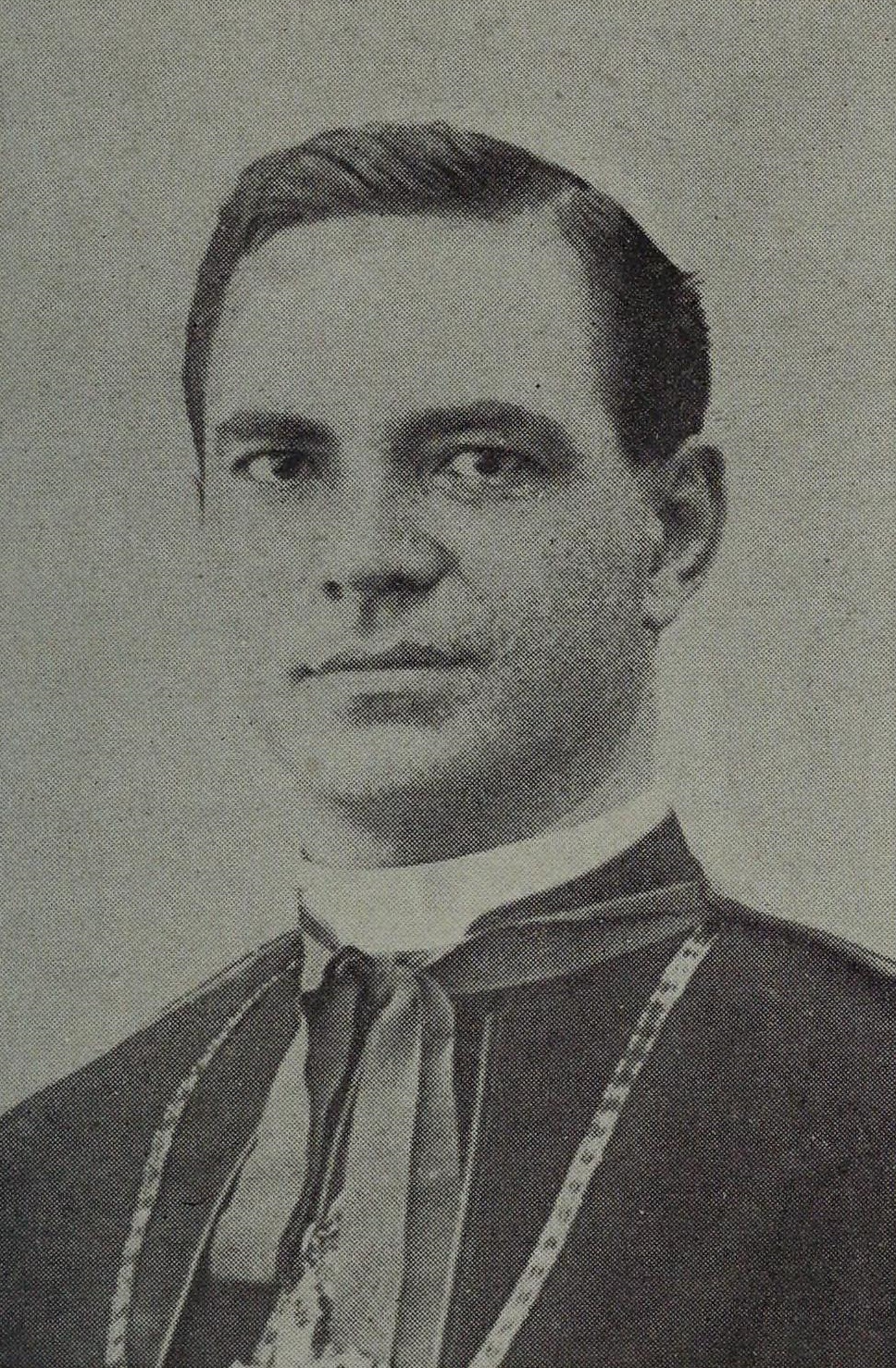
Giuseppe Petrelli (89), an Italian prelate and secretary to the Apostolic Delegate to the Philippines, became the first bishop of Lipa in 1910. He later became Apostolic Delegate to the Philippines in 1915, and Apostolic Nuncio to Peru in 1921.

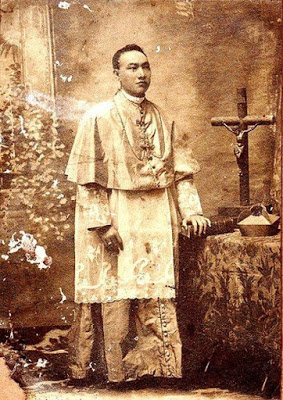
The Servant of God Alfredo Verzosa (94) was the second bishop of Lipa.

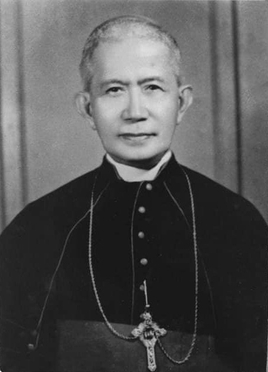
The Venerable Alfredo Obviar (113) was the Auxiliary Bishop of Lipa under the Servant of God Alfredo Verzosa. He later became the first bishop of Lucena.

No.	Picture	Bishop	Consecrators	Date	Diocese	Coat of arms	Ref
81		Dennis Joseph Dougherty* (Note: Also #255 in the United States historical succession of bishops.) (Note: Elevated to cardinal while serving as archbishop in the United States.)	BE1" BF1 BG1	14 Jun 1903	XXVIII Nueva Segovia, V Jaro		
82		Frederick Zadok Rooker	BH1 BI1 BJ1	14 Jun 1903	IV Jaro		
83		Jeremiah James Harty (Note: Also #257 in the United States historical succession of bishops.)	BE1" BK1 BL1	15 Aug 1903	XXVI Manila		
84		Thomas Augustine Hendrick	BE1" 83 BM1	23 Aug 1903	XIX Cebu		
85		Jorge Barlin y Imperial	BN1° 83 82	29 Jun 1906	XXVII Nueva Cáceres		
86		James Jordan Carroll	BN1° 83 81	14 Feb 1909	XXIX Nueva Segovia		
87		Juan Bautista Gorordo y Perfecto	BN1° 81 86	24 Jun 1909	Cebu (auxiliary) XX Cebu		
88		John Bernard MacGinley (Note: Also #291 in the United States historical succession of bishops.)	BO1" BP1 BQ1	10 May 1910	XXVIII Nueva Cáceres		
89		Giuseppe Petrelli	BN1° 81 87	12 Jun 1910	I Lipa		
90		Pablo Singzon y Baeza (de la Anunciacion)	BN1° 81 87	12 Jun 1910	I Calbayog		
-		Charles Warren Currier (Note: Declined the appointment. Later appointed as Bishop of Matanzas in Cuba.)	-	25 Jun 1910	I Zamboanga (elect)		
91		Maurice Patrick Foley	BR1 BS1 BT1	15 Dec 1910	I Tuguegarao, VI Jaro		
-		Victoriano Román Zárate (de San José) (Note: Appointed and served as prefect, but was not consecrated as bishop.)	-	21 Apr 1911	I Palawan (Note: Later renamed Puerto Princesa)		
92		Michael James O’Doherty	BU1 BV1 BW1	3 Sep 1911	II Zamboanga, XXVII Manila		
93		Peter Joseph Hurth	BX1 BY1 BZ1	7 Jan 1913 (16 Sep 1894)	XXX Nueva Segovia		
94		Alfredo Verzosa y Florentin^{¤}	89° 91 88	20 Jan 1917	II Lipa		
95		James Paul McCloskey	81 93 CA1	1 May 1917	III Zamboanga, VII Jaro		
96		Santiago Caragnan Sancho	89° 88 94	29 Jun 1917	II Tuguegarao, XXXI Nueva Segovia		
97		Sofronio Hacbang y Gaborni	89° 94 96	8 Jun 1919	Calbayog (auxiliary), II Calbayog		
98		José Clos y Pagés	89° 94 95	17 Oct 1920	IV Zamboanga		
99		Francisco Sales Reyes y Alicante	CB1° 93 94	19 Sep 1925	XXIX Nueva Cáceres		
100		Constant Jurgens	CC1 CD1 CE1	18 Mar 1928	III Tuguegarao (Note: He was also the bishop of the Diocese of the Los Baños Internment Camp established by the Apostolic Nuncio during World War II.)		
101		William Finnemann^{¤}	92 96 94	21 May 1929	Manila (auxiliary), I Mindoro (Note: Later renamed Calapan)		
102		Cesar Maria Guerrero y Rodriguez^{¤}	92 94 96	24 May 1929	I Lingayen, (Note: Later renamed Lingayen-Dagupan) Manila (auxiliary), I San Fernando		
103		Gabriel Martelino Reyes	CB1° 95 94	11 Oct 1932	XXI Cebu, Manila (coadjutor), XXVIII Manila		
104		Luis Valdesco Del Rosario	92 94 102	4 Jun 1933	V Zamboanga		
105		James Thomas Gibbons Hayes	CF1 CG1 CH1	18 Jun 1933	I Cagayan de Oro		
106		Casimiro Magbanua Lladoc	CB1° 95 99	16 Sep 1933	I Bacolod		
-		Jozef Billiet	-	15 Nov 1935	I Mountain Province (Note: Later renamed Baguio, elevated to a diocese in 2004)		
107		Miguel Acebedo y Flores	CB1° 104 106	25 Mar 1938	III Calbayog		
108		Manuel Mascariñas y Morgia	CB1° 104 106	25 Mar 1938	I Palo, II Tagbilaran		
109		Mariano Aspiras Madriaga	103 96 100	24 May 1938	II Lingayen-Dagupan		
110		Pedro Paulo Santos Songco	CB1° 96 106	15 Aug 1938	XXX Cáceres		
-		Leandro Nieto y Bolandier	-	25 Nov 1938	II Palawan		
111		Jan Vrakking	103 105 104	21 Sep 1940	I Surigao		
112		José Maria Diosomito Cuenco	CB1° 102 109	27 Dec 1942	Jaro (auxiliary), VIII Jaro		
113		Alfredo Maria Obviar y Aranda^{#}	CB1° 110 102	29 Jun 1944	Lipa (auxiliary), I Lucena		
-		Enrique (Henry) Ederle	-	21 Jun 1946	II Mindoro		

=== Post-colonial Period (1946-1962) ===
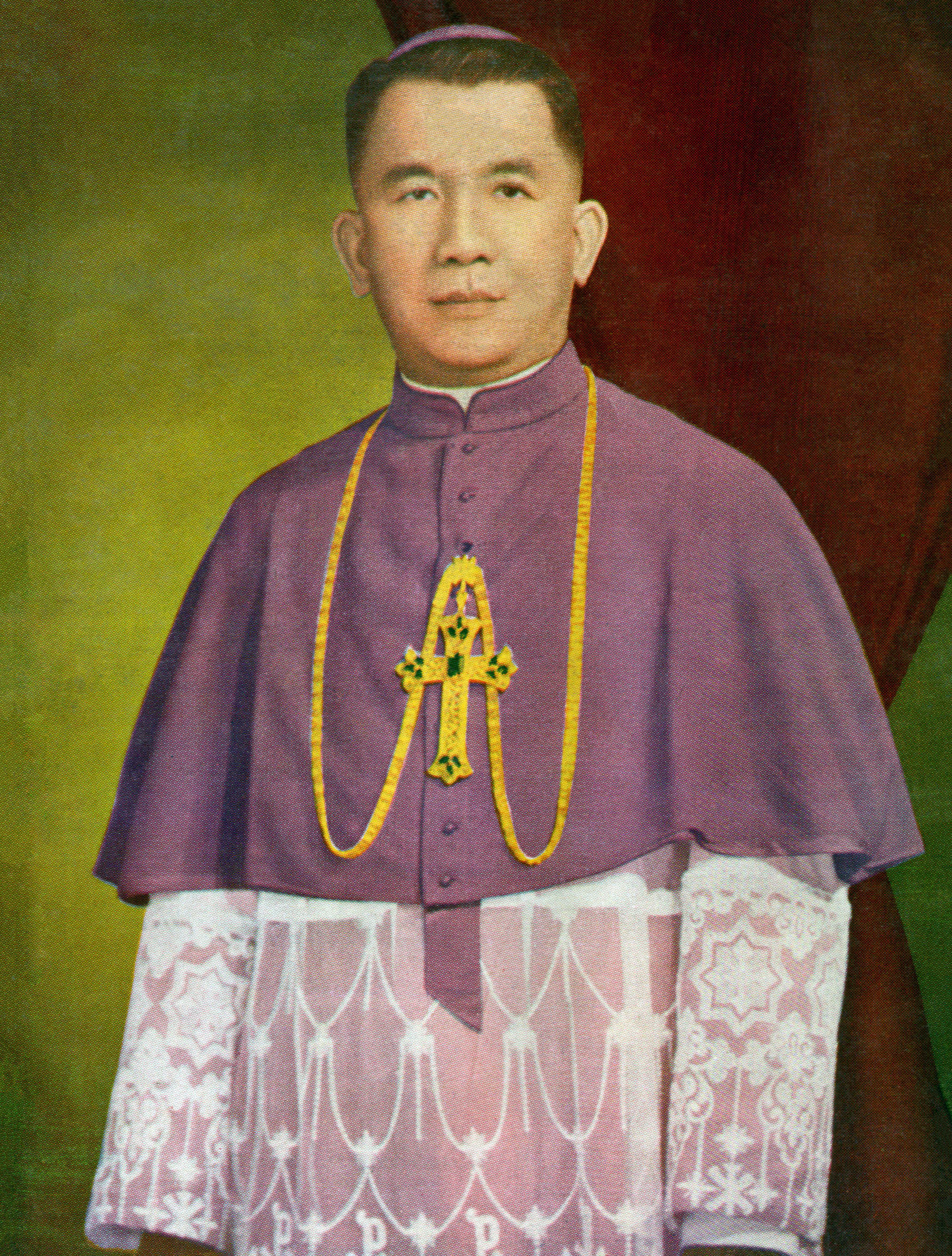
Julio Rosales (114), the twenty-second Archbishop of Cebu became the second Filipino cardinal in 1969.

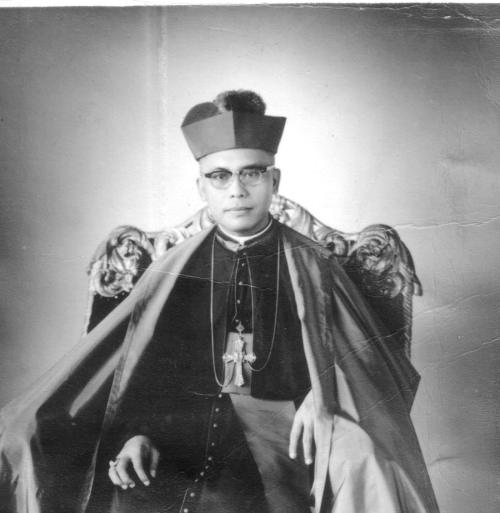
The Venerable Teofilo Camomot (132) became an auxiliary bishop of Jaro, and was later made coadjutor archbishop of Cagayan de Oro.

No.	Picture	Bishop	Consecrators	Date	Diocese	Coat of arms	Ref
114		Julio Rosales y Ras*	CB1° 108 107	21 Sep 1946	I Tagbilaran, XXII Cebu		
115		Juan Callanta Sison	CB1° 96 100	25 Jul 1947	Nueva Segovia (auxiliary), Nueva Segovia (coadjutor), XXXII Nueva Segovia		
116		Rufino Jiao Santos*	92 103 109	24 Oct 1947	Manila (auxiliary), I Military Ordinariate, XXIX Manila		
117		William Brasseur	92 96 100	24 Aug 1948	II Mountain Province		
118		Alejandro Ayson Olalia	100 116 102	25 Jul 1949	Tuguegarao (coadjutor), IV Tuguegarao, III Lipa		
119		Vicente Posada Reyes	CI1° 116 118	24 Aug 1950	Manila (auxiliary), I Borongan, II Cabanatuan		
120		Manuel Porcia Yap	CI1° 105 108	1 May 1951	I Capiz, II Bacolod		
121		Gérard Mongeau	CI1° 104 116	29 Jun 1951	I Cotabato		
122		Wilhelm Josef Duschak	CI1° 109 119	21 Sep 1951	III Calapan		
123		Peregrin de la Fuente Néstar	CI1° 118 116	29 Sep 1951	I Batanes-Babuyanes (Note: Later renamed Batanes)		
124		Lino Rasdesales Gonzaga	CI1° 108 107	28 Jan 1952	II Palo, VI Zamboanga		
125		Antonio Floro Frondosa	112 120 107	28 May 1952	II Capiz		
126		Flaviano Barrechea Ariola	110 120 123	6 Aug 1952	I Legazpi		
127		Teopisto Valderrama Alberto	CI1° 115 126	7 Oct 1952	I Sorsogon, Cáceres (coadjutor), XXXI Cáceres		
128		Patrick Harmon Shanley	CI1° 113 118	17 Mar 1953	I Infanta		
129		Hernando Izquierdo Antiporda	116 118 119	28 Oct 1954	Manila (auxiliary)		
130		Juan Bautista Velasco Díaz	CJ1 CK1 CL1	1955 (1948)	Manila (auxiliary)		
131		Clovis Joseph Thibauld (Thibault)	105 104 120	11 Feb 1955	I Davao		
132		Teofilo Camomot Bastida^{#}	114 108 120	29 May 1955	Jaro (auxiliary), Cagayan de Oro (coadjutor)		
133		Charles Van den Ouwelant	105 104 124	21 Jun 1955	II Surigao		
134		Manuel Platon Del Rosario	110 127 124	25 Jul 1955	Calbayog (coadjutor), IV Calbayog, I Malolos		
135		Gregorio Espiga e Infante	116 123 120	10 Sep 1955	III Palawan		
136		Patrick Henry Cronin	CM1 CN1 CO1	25 Sep 1955	I Ozamis, II Cagayan de Oro		
137		Epifanio Surban y Belmonte	114 120 126	24 Oct 1955	I Dumaguete		
138		Odilo Etspueler	CI1° 109 122	11 Oct 1956	I Bangued		
139		Henry Charles Byrne	CI1° 129 136	29 Oct 1956	I Iba		
140		Emilio Cinense y Abera	CI1° 118 129	11 May 1957	II San Fernando		
141		Teodulfo Sabugal Domingo	CI1° 118 123	2 Jul 1957	V Tuguegarao		
142		Francis Joseph McSorley	CP1 121 CQ1	8 Oct 1958	I Jolo		
143		Juan Nicolasora Nilmar	132 137 125	11 May 1959	Jaro (auxiliary), Davao (coadjutor), I Kalibo		
144		Arnulfo Surtida Arcilla	CR1° 126 134	12 Dec 1959	II Sorsogon		
145		Charles Quentin Bertram Olwell	CR1° CS1 121	25 Apr 1961	I Marbel		
146		Pedro Bantigue y Natividad	116 130 122	25 Jul 1961	Manila (auxiliary), I San Pablo		
147		Antonio Lloren Mabutas	CR1° 143 144	27 Jul 1961	I Laoag, Davao (coadjutor), II Davao		
148		Leopoldo Arayata Arcaira	116 132 129	25 Jan 1962	Zamboanga (auxiliary), Malolos (auxiliary)		
149		Artemio Gabriel Casas	116 115 123	24 Feb 1962	I Imus, Manila (auxiliary), X Jaro		
150		Joseph William Regan	CR1° 131 145	25 Apr 1962	I Tagum		
151		Cipriano Urgel y Villahermosa	CR1° 108 124	12 Jun 1962	V Calbayog, V Palo		
152		Henricus Cornelius de Wit	CR1° 143 CT1	19 Jun 1962	I San Jose de Antique		

=== Second Vatican Council and aftermath (1963-1989) ===
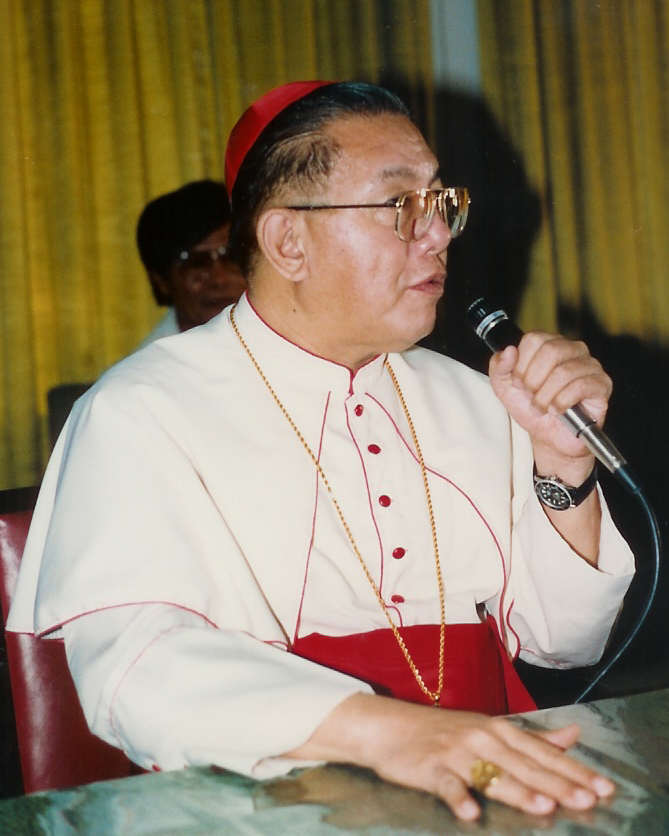
Jaime Lachica Sin (161) became the third Filipino cardinal. He led the protest against the Marcos regime during the 1986 EDSA Revolution.

No.	Picture	Bishop	Consecrators	Date	Diocese	Coat of arms	Ref
153		Jesus Juan Acosta Sison	109 115 140	11 May 1963	I Tarlac		
154		Mariano Gaviola y Garcés	CR1° 115 140	4 Jun 1963	I Cabanatuan, II Military Ordinariate, V Lipa		
155		José María Querexeta y Mendizábal	116 130 135	25 Jan 1964	I Isabela		
156		Julio Xavier Labayen	116 113 146	8 Sep 1966	II Infanta		
-		Mario de Leon Baltazar	-	18 Nov 1966	II Batanes-Babuyanes		
157		Manuel Sandalo Salvador	114 124 132	19 Jan 1967	Cebu (auxiliary), IV Palo, Cebu (coadjutor)		
158		Bienvenido Mercado Lopez	116 129 148	22 Jan 1967	Manila (auxiliary)		
159		Teotimo Cruel Pacis	116 124 127	25 Jan 1967	III Palo, II Legazpi		
160		Antonio Yapsutco Fortich	116 125 137	24 Feb 1967	III Bacolod		
161		Jaime Lachica Sin*	125 143 157	18 Mar 1967	Jaro (auxiliary), Jaro (coadjutor), IX Jaro, XXX Manila		
162		Jesus Yu Varela	127 154 156	30 Apr 1967	Zamboanga (auxiliary), II Ozamis, III Sorsogon		
163		Carmelo Dominador Flores Morelos	127 144 133	5 Jul 1967	I Butuan, VIII Zamboanga		
164		Felix Sanchez Zafra	108 157 162	22 Oct 1967	I Dipolog, IV Tagbilaran		
165		Bienvenido Solon Tudtud	CU1° 124 132	24 Mar 1968	Dumaguete (auxiliary), I Iligan, I Marawi		
166		José Tomás Sánchez*	CU1° 126 144	12 May 1968	Cáceres (auxiliary), Lucena (coadjutor), II Lucena, XXXIII Nueva Segovia (Note: Later appointed as Prefect of the Congregation for the Clergy.)		
167		Godofredo Pisig Pedernal	CU1° 113 114	18 May 1968	II Borongan		
168		Francisco Raval Cruces	CU1° 109 147	24 Jul 1968	Lingayen-Dagupan (auxiliary), I Ilagan, VII Zamboanga		
169		Vicente Ataviado y Tumalad	CU1° 114 127	8 Aug 1968	I Maasin		
170		Porfirio Rivera Iligan	CU1° 146 157	3 Sep 1968	I Masbate		
171		Victorino Cristobal Ligot	CU1° 115 147	27 Mar 1969	Nueva Segovia (Auxiliary), I San Fernando de La Union		
172		Amado Paulino y Hernandez	116 129 149	27 May 1969	Manila (auxiliary)		
173		Felix Paz Perez	116 129 149	27 May 1969	II Imus		
174		Francisco Funaay Claver	CU1° 132 117	22 Aug 1969	I Malaybalay, II Bontoc-Lagawe		
175		Antonino Francisco Nepomuceno	CU1° 121 158	31 Aug 1969	Cotabato (auxiliary)		
176		Albert van Overbeke	CU1° 115 117	30 Nov 1969	I Bayombong		
177		Reginald Edward Vincent Arliss	145 CV1 CW1	30 Jan 1970	II Marbel		
178		Salvador Lazo Lazo	CU1° 115 141	3 Feb 1970	Tuguegarao (auxiliary), Nueva Segovia (auxiliary), II San Fernando de La Union		
179		Nicolas Mollenedo Mondejar	CU1° 125 157	30 Aug 1970	Cebu (auxiliary), I Romblon, I San Carlos		
180		Miguel Gatan Purugganan	CU1° 153 141	22 Apr 1971	Nueva Segovia (auxiliary), II Ilagan		
181		Rafael Montiano Lim	CU1° 153 113	27 Apr 1971	II Laoag, I Boac		
182		Emiliano Kulhi Madangeng	CU1° 117 173	21 Jul 1971	Mountain Province (auxiliary), Mountain Province (coadjutor), III Mountain Province		
183		Ricardo Jamin Vidal*	CU1° 169 180	30 Nov 1971	IV Lipa, Cebu (coadjutor), XXIII Cebu		
184		Federico Guba Limon	PP262 CX1 CY1	13 Feb 1972	Lingayen-Dagupan (coadjutor), III Lingayen-Dagupan		
185		Celso Nogoy Guevarra	CU1° 140 119	28 Aug 1972	San Fernando (auxiliary), I Balanga		
186		Philip Francis Smith	CU1° 124 121	8 Sep 1972	II Jolo, Cotabato (coadjutor), II Cotabato		
187		Miguel Clarete Cinches	CU1° 184 133	24 Mar 1973	III Surigao		
188		Jesus Balaso Tuquib	108 124 164	29 May 1973	I Pagadian, Cagayan de Oro (coadjutor), III Cagayan de Oro		
189		Concordio Maria Sarte	114 127 159	22 Jul 1973	Cáceres (auxiliary), Sorsogon (auxiliary), III Legazpi		
190		Cirilo Reyes Almario, Jr.	CZ1° 183 181	18 Oct 1973	Malolos (coadjutor), II Malolos		
191		Simeon Oliveros Valerio	CZ1° 184 122	26 Jan 1974	IV Calapan		
192		Onesimo Cadiz Gordoncillo	CZ1° 137 160	27 May 1974	Dumaguete (auxiliary), III Tagbilaran, III Capiz		
193		Ricardo Pido Tancinco	CZ1° 151 169	30 May 1974	VI Calbayog		
194		José Crisologo Sorra	114 127 161	28 Aug 1974	I Virac, IV Legazpi		
195		Celestino Rojo Enverga	127 159 144	1 Sep 1974	I Daet		
196		Gaudencio Borbon Rosales*	CZ1° 161 183	28 Oct 1974 (52 years, 12 days)	Manila (auxiliary), Malaybalay (coadjutor), II Malaybalay, VI Lipa, XXXI Manila		
197		Alberto Jover Piamonte	CZ1° 149 161	2 Feb 1975	Jaro (auxiliary), XI Jaro		
198		Angel Tec-i Hobayan	CZ1° 169 193	5 Mar 1975	I Catarman		
199		Fernando Robles Capalla	CZ1° 149 161	18 Jun 1975	Davao (auxiliary), II Iligan, Davao (coadjutor), III Davao		
200		Ireneo Alisla Amantillo	CZ1° 136 149	15 Mar 1976	Cagayan de Oro (auxiliary), I Tandag		
201		Antonio Isauro Alzate Buenafe	161 115 138	30 Mar 1976	Nueva Segovia (auxiliary)		
202		Oscar Valero Cruz	CZ1° 161 149	3 May 1976	Manila (auxiliary), III San Fernando, IV Lingayen-Dagupan		
203		Federico Ocampo Escaler	161 136 121	31 Jul 1976	I Kidapawan, I Ipil		
204		Sincero Barcenilla Lucero	CZ1° 132 169	24 May 1977	III Borongan, VII Calbayog		
205		Leonardo Zamora Legaspi	CZ1° 130 203	8 Aug 1977	Manila (auxiliary), XXXII Cáceres		
206		Protacio Guevarra Gungon	CZ1° 171 202 183 146	24 Aug 1977	Manila (auxiliary), I Antipolo		
207		Pedro Rosales Dean	114 147 159	25 Jan 1978	Davao (auxiliary), II Tagum, VI Palo		
208		Jesus Armamento Dosado	114 147 159	25 Jan 1978	Cebu (auxiliary), Cagayan de Oro (auxiliary), III Ozamis		
209		Generoso Cambronero Camiña	161 147 150	24 May 1978	Davao (auxiliary), I Digos		
210		Nestor Celestial Cariño	CZ1° 127 126	31 May 1978	Legazpi (auxiliary), IV Borongan, Daet (auxiliary), V Legazpi		
211		Edmundo Madarang Abaya	CZ1° 147 170	19 Jan 1979	III Laoag, XXXIV Nueva Segovia		
212		Salvador Trane Modesto	114 173 151	3 May 1979	Dumaguete (auxiliary), San Carlos (auxiliary)		
213		Manuel Cruz Sobreviñas	161 171 206	25 May 1979	Manila (auxiliary), III Imus		
214		Paciano Basilio Aniceto	PP264 DA1 DB1	27 May 1979 (47 years, 166 days)	Tuguegarao (auxiliary), II Iba, IV San Fernando		
215		Pedro de Guzman Magugat	PP264 DA1 DB1	27 May 1979 (47 years, 166 days)	Cabanatuan (auxiliary), III Military Ordinariate, I Urdaneta		
216		Vicente Macanan Navarra	125 171 197	26 June 1979 (47 years, 136 days)	Capiz (auxiliary), I Kabankalan, IV Bacolod		
217		Salvador Quizon Quizon	CZ1° 183 190	22 Aug 1979	Lipa (auxiliary)		
218		Ruben Tolentino Profugo	CZ1° 166 169	18 Oct 1979	III Lucena		
219		George Eli Dion	CZ1° 167 186	23 Apr 1980	III Jolo		
220		Jesus Aputen Cabrera	CZ1° 184 115	1 Jul 1980 (46 years, 131 days)	Lingayen-Dagupan (auxiliary), I Alaminos		
221		Sofio Guinto Balce	CZ1° 127 168	12 Jul 1980	Cáceres (auxiliary), Cabanatuan (coadjutor), IV Cabanatuan		
222		Angel Nacorda Lagdameo	CZ1° 183 166	12 Aug 1980	Cebu (auxiliary), Dumaguete (coadjutor), II Dumaguete, XII Jaro		
223		Orlando Beltran Quevedo*	CZ1° 186 203	28 Oct 1980 (46 years, 12 days)	II Kidapawan, XXXV Nueva Segovia, III Cotabato		
224		Dinualdo Destajo Gutierrez	125 177 199	28 Jan 1981	Marbel (coadjutor), III Marbel		
225		Leoncio Leviste Lat	CZ1° 183 190	29 Jan 1981	Malolos (auxiliary), Manila (auxiliary)		
226		Wilfredo Dasco Manlapaz	CZ1° 127 173	7 Feb 1981	Maasin (auxiliary), III Tagum		
227		Gabriel Villaruz Reyes	CZ1° 125 171	3 Apr 1981 (45 years, 220 days)	Manila (auxiliary), II Kalibo, III Antipolo		
228		Patricio Hacbang Alo	114 157 207	7 Jun 1981	Davao (auxiliary), I Mati		
229		Filomeno Gonzales Bactol	CZ1° 151 212	15 Oct 1981 (45 years, 25 days)	Palo (auxiliary), I Naval		
230		Christian Vicente Fernandez Noel	114 136 132	30 Nov 1981	Cagayan de Oro (auxiliary), I Talibon		
231		Cesar Castro Raval	CZ1° 167 138	18 Feb 1982	Bangued (auxiliary), II Bangued		
232		Lucilo Barrameda Quiambao	161 127 189	27 Apr 1982 (44 years, 196 days)	Legazpi (auxiliary)		
233		Ramon Barrera Villena	CZ1° 141 207	2 Jul 1982 (44 years, 130 days)	Tagum (auxiliary), II Bayombong		
234		Ciceron Santa Maria Tumbocon	CZ1° 125 119	7 Oct 1982	Cabanatuan (coadjutor), III Cabanatuan		
235		Antonio Realubin Tobias	CZ1° 167 202	25 Jan 1983 (43 years, 288 days)	Zamboanga (auxiliary), II Pagadian, III San Fernando de La Union, II Novaliches		
236		Teodoro Javier Buhain, Jr.	CZ1° 202 171	21 Feb 1983	Manila (auxiliary)		
237		Raul José Quimpo Martirez	CZ1° 152 197	24 Mar 1983	II San Jose de Antique		
238		Vicente Credo Manuel	CZ1° 191 184	29 Jun 1983	I San Jose in Mindoro		
239		Francisco Capiral San Diego	CZ1° 202 135	10 Aug 1983	Palawan (coadjutor), IV Palawan, II San Pablo, I Pasig		
240		Diosdado Aenlle Talamayan	CZ1° 141 180	12 Jan 1984 (42 years, 301 days)	Tuguegarao (auxiliary), VI Tuguegarao		
241		Teodoro Cruz Bacani, Jr.	CZ1° 171 214	12 Apr 1984 (42 years, 211 days)	Manila (auxiliary), I Novaliches		
242		Florentino Ferrer Cinense	CZ1° 184 234	14 Jul 1984 (42 years, 118 days)	I San Jose, Tarlac (coadjutor), II Tarlac		
243		Emilio Zurbano Marquez	CZ1° 183 218	29 Jan 1985 (41 years, 284 days)	I Gumaca, Lucena (coadjutor), IV Lucena		
244		Juan de Dios Mataflorida Pueblos	CZ1° 147 192	24 Jun 1985	Davao (auxiliary), III Kidapawan, II Butuan		
245		Deogracias Soriano Iñiguez, Jr.	CZ1° 205 190	22 Aug 1985 (41 years, 79 days)	Malolos (auxiliary), III Iba, I Kalookan		
246		Patricio Maqui Lopez	CZ1° 138 211	5 Dec 1985	Nueva Segovia (auxiliary)		
247		Severino Miguel Pelayo	CZ1° 215 213	8 Jan 1986	IV Military Ordinariate		
248		Ernesto Antolin Salgado	CZ1° 182 223	15 Jan 1987 (39 years, 298 days)	Mountain Province (coadjutor), IV Baguio, IV Laoag, XXXVI Nueva Segovia		
249		Leopoldo Sumaylo Tumulak	183 157 222	16 Mar 1987	Cebu (auxiliary), V Tagbilaran, VI Military Ordinariate		
250		Leonardo Yuzon Medroso	CZ1° 169 210	17 Mar 1987 (39 years, 237 days)	V Borongan, VI Tagbilaran		
251		Camilo Diaz Gregorio	166 DC1 DD1	29 Mar 1987	Cebu (auxiliary), IV Bacolod, IV Batanes		
252		Jesus Castro Galang	CZ1° 202 214	4 Jul 1987	San Fernando (auxiliary), II Urdaneta		
253		Leo Murphy Drona	CZ1° 227 146	25 Jul 1987 (39 years, 107 days)	II San Jose, III San Pablo		
254		Jose Ricare Manguiran	CZ1° 196 174	19 Aug 1987 (39 years, 82 days)	II Dipolog		
255		Maximiano Tuazon Cruz	183 207 157	1 Dec 1987	Calbayog (auxiliary), VIII Calbayog		
256		Sebastian Acol Dalis	CZ1° 248 182	25 Feb 1988	Mountain Province (auxiliary)		
257		Romulo Tolentino de la Cruz	CZ1° 186 155	16 Mar 1988	Isabela (coadjutor), II Isabela, San Jose de Antique (coadjutor), III San Jose de Antique, V Kidapawan, X Zamboanga		
258		Alfredo Banluta Baquial	CZ1° 147 192	6 Apr 1988	Davao (auxiliary)		
259		Vicente Salgado y Garrucho	CZ1° 197 160	25 Jul 1988	II Romblon		
260		Warlito Itucas Cajandig	161 179 259	17 Apr 1989	V Calapan		

=== Turn of the New Millenium (1990-2009) ===
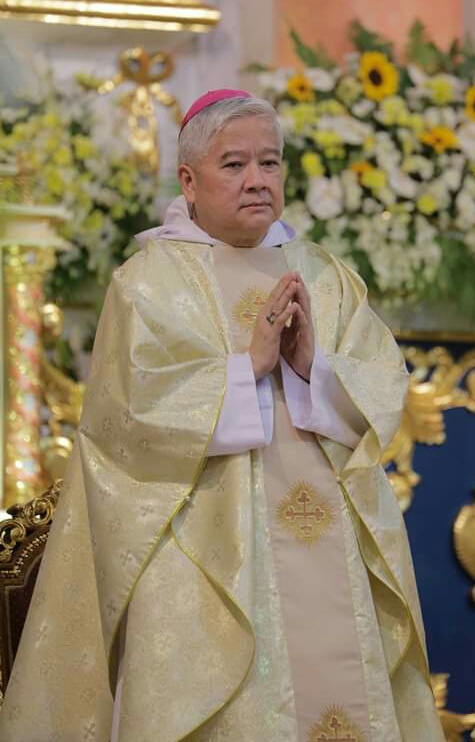
Socrates Buenaventura Villegas (292) became the archbishop of Lingayen-Dagupan on November 4, 2009.

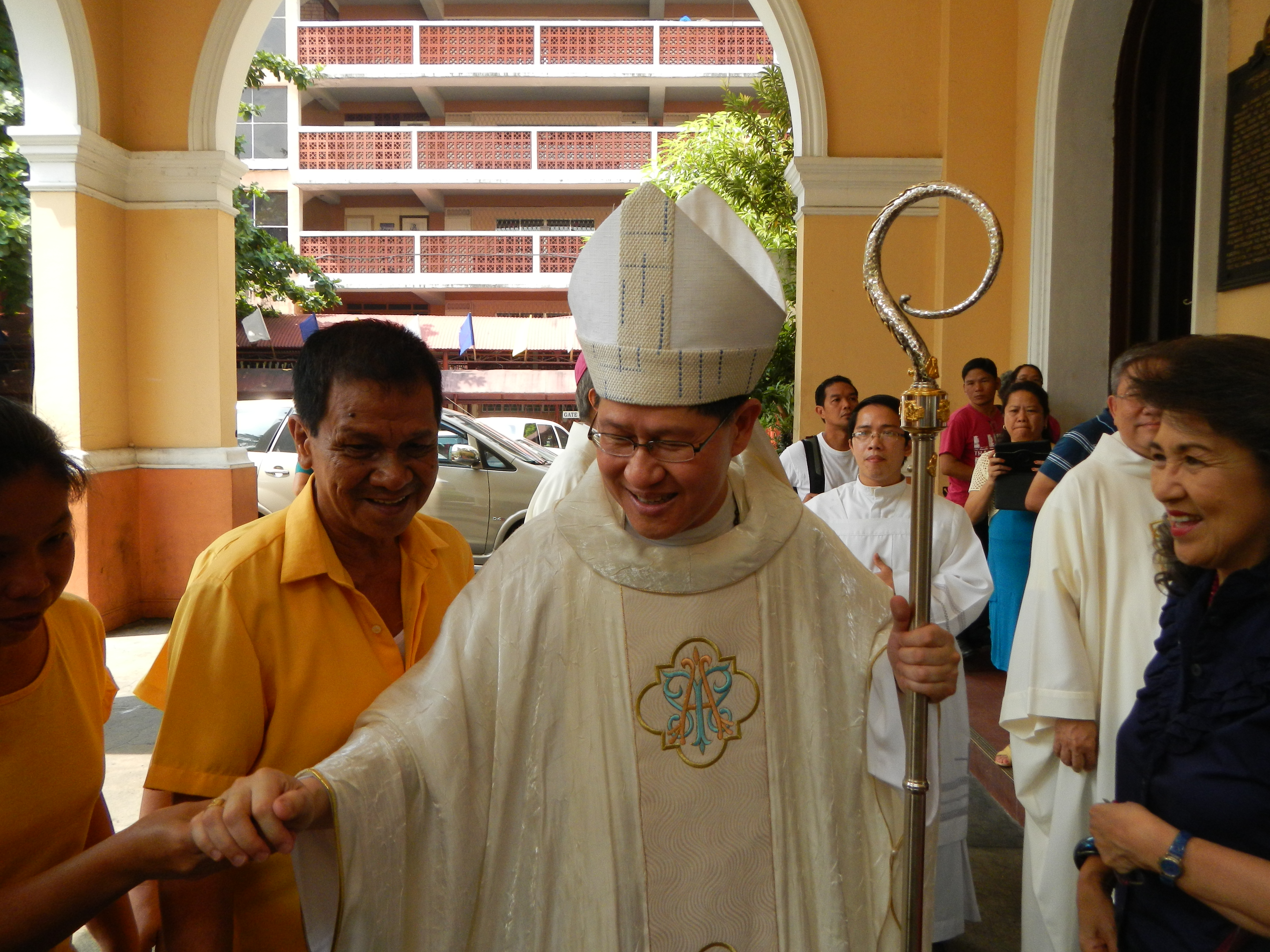
Cardinal Luis Antonio Tagle (295), former archbishop of Manila from 2011 to 2020, was appointed Prefect of the Congregation for the Evangelization of Peoples in 2019, and Pro-Prefect of the Section for the First Evangelization and New Particular Churches of the Dicastery for Evangelization in 2022.

No.	Picture	Bishop	Consecrators	Date	Diocese	Coat of arms	Ref
261		Benjamin de Jesus Almoneda	PP264 DE1 DF1	6 Jan 1990	Daet (auxiliary), II Daet		
262		Prospero Nale Arellano	CZ1° 189 261	19 Mar 1990	I Libmanan		
263		Antonio Racelis Rañola	CZ1° 218 222	4 Apr 1990 (36 years, 219 days)	Cebu (auxiliary)		
264		Emilio Layon Bataclan	CZ1° 249 251	19 Apr 1990	Cebu (auxiliary), III Iligan, Cebu (auxiliary)		
265		Benjamin David de Jesus	PP264 DE1 DG1	6 Jan 1992	IV Jolo		
266		Brigido Agalpas Galasgas	DH1° 240 248	25 Nov 1992	I Bontoc-Lagawe		
267		Carlito Joaquin Cenzon	DH1° 240 248	25 Nov 1992	I Tabuk, V Baguio		
268		Artemio Lomboy Rillera	DH1° 223 231	28 Aug 1993	III Bangued, IV San Fernando de La Union		
269		Ramon Cabrera Argüelles	PP264 DE1 DG1	6 Jan 1994 (32 years, 307 days)	Manila (auxiliary), V Military Ordinariate, VII Lipa		
270		Honesto Chaves Pacana	DH1° 188 196	24 Mar 1994	III Malaybalay		
271		Crisostomo Ayson Yalung	161 202 214	31 May 1994 (32 years, 162 days)	Manila (auxiliary), II Antipolo		
272		Manolo Alarcon de los Santos	166 DH1° 205	12 Sep 1994 (32 years, 58 days)	II Virac		
273		Rolando Octavus Joven Tria Tirona	161 156 236	29 Dec 1994 (31 years, 315 days)	Manila (auxiliary), III Malolos, III Infanta, XXXIII Cáceres		
274		Zacharias Cenita Jimenez	PP264 DE1 DI1	6 Jan 1995	III Pagadian, Butuan (auxiliary)		
275		Precioso Dacalos Cantillas^{‡}	183 264 253	12 Jul 1995 (31 years, 120 days)	Cebu (auxiliary), **II Maasin**		
276		Pedro Dulay Arigo	161 239 245	18 May 1996 (30 years, 175 days)	V Puerto Princesa		
277		Jose Paala Salazar	161 205 240	7 Jun 1996	III Batanes-Babuyanes, Butuan (auxiliary), Lipa (auxiliary)		
278		Antonio Javellana Ledesma	DH1° 188 203	31 Aug 1996 (30 years, 70 days)	Ipil (coadjutor), II Ipil, IV Cagayan de Oro		
279		Sergio Lasam Utleg	DH1° 240 180	17 Mar 1997 (29 years, 237 days)	Ilagan (coadjutor), III Ilagan, V Laoag, VII Tuguegarao		
280		Jesse Eugenio Mercado^{‡}	161 236 241	31 Mar 1997 (29 years, 223 days)	Manila (auxiliary), I Parañaque		
281		Romulo Geolina Valles	DH1° 186 226	6 Aug 1997 (29 years, 95 days)	IV Kidapawan, IX Zamboanga, IV Davao		
282		Arturo Mandin Bastes	183 187 249	21 Aug 1997	III Romblon, Sorsogon (coadjutor), IV Sorsogon		
283		John Forrosuelo Du^{‡}	183 264 230	6 Jan 1998 (28 years, 307 days)	Cebu (auxiliary), III Dumaguete, **VIII Palo**		
284		Angelito Rendon Lampon	PP264 DE1 DI1	6 Jan 1998 (28 years, 307 days)	V Jolo, IV Cotabato		
285		Jose Serofia Palma	DH1° 197 199	13 Jan 1998 (28 years, 300 days)	Cebu (auxiliary), IX Calbayog, VII Palo, XXIV Cebu		
286		Joel Zamudio Baylon^{‡}	DH1° 205 194	25 Mar 1998 (28 years, 229 days)	II Masbate, **VI Legazpi**		
287		Honesto Flores Ongtioco	161 214 185	18 Jun 1998 (28 years, 144 days)	II Balanga, I Cubao		
288		Antonieto Dumagan Cabajog^{‡}	183 163 192	16 Mar 1999 (27 years, 238 days)	Cebu (auxiliary), **IV Surigao**		
289		José Francisco Oliveros	DJ1° 196 243	20 Mar 2000	II Boac, IV Malolos		
290		Guillermo Dela Vega Afable^{‡}	DJ1° 199 209	12 Jul 2001 (25 years, 120 days)	Davao (auxiliary), Digos (coadjutor), **II Digos**		
291		Sofronio Aguirre Bancud	DJ1° 240 221	2 Aug 2001 (25 years, 99 days)	Cabanatuan (auxiliary), V Cabanatuan		
292		Socrates Buenaventura Villegas^{‡}	161 271 280	31 Aug 2001 (25 years, 70 days)	Manila (auxiliary), III Balanga, **V Lingayen-Dagupan**		
293		Jose Fuerte Advincula*^{‡}	DJ1° 192 222	8 Sep 2001 (25 years, 62 days)	II San Carlos, IV Capiz, **XXXIII Manila**		
294		Nereo Page Odchimar	161 292 200	27 Nov 2001	II Tandag		
295		Luis Antonio Gokim Tagle*	161 213 276	12 Dec 2001 (24 years, 332 days)	IV Imus, XXXII Manila (Note: Later appointed as Pro-prefect for the Section of First Evangelization of the Dicastery of Evangelization)		
296		Edwin de la Peña y Angot^{‡}	DJ1° 208 199	27 Dec 2001 (24 years, 317 days)	**II Marawi**		
297		Julito Buhisan Cortes^{‡}	183 192 283	8 Jan 2002 (24 years, 305 days)	Cebu (auxiliary), **IV Dumaguete**		
298		Martin Sarmiento Jumoad^{‡}	163 278 284	10 Jan 2002 (24 years, 303 days)	III Isabela, **IV Ozamis**		
299		Antonio Pepito Palang	DJ1° 260 238	31 May 2002	II San Jose in Mindoro		
300		Buenaventura Malayo Famadico	DJ1° 196 260	19 Jun 2002 (24 years, 143 days)	Lipa (auxiliary), II Gumaca, IV San Pablo		
301		Edgardo Sarabia Juanich	DJ1° 239 276	11 Jul 2002 (24 years, 121 days)	I Taytay		
302		Isabelo Caiban Abarquez^{‡}	183 283 249	18 Feb 2003 (23 years, 264 days)	Cebu (auxiliary), Palo (auxiliary), **X Calbayog**		
303		Patricio Abella Buzon	183 275 216	19 Feb 2003 (23 years, 263 days)	II Kabankalan, VI Bacolod		
304		Prudencio Padilla Andaya, Jr.^{‡}	183 240 267	16 Jul 2003 (23 years, 116 days)	II Tabuk, **VI Cabanatuan**		
305		Jose Corazon Tumbagahan Tala-oc	161 192 227	30 Jul 2003 (23 years, 102 days)	IV Romblon, IV Kalibo		
306		Jose Romeo Juanito Orquejo Lazo	DJ1° 222 257	29 Dec 2003 (22 years, 315 days)	III Kalibo, IV San Jose de Antique, XIII Jaro		
307		Cornelio Galleo Wigwigan	DJ1° 174 267	14 Jul 2004	III Bontoc-Lagawe		
308		Emmanuel Celeste Trance	DJ1° 199 222	22 Jul 2004 (22 years, 110 days)	Catarman (coadjutor), II Catarman		
309		Florentino Galang Lavarias^{‡}	DJ1° 214 196	12 Aug 2004 (22 years, 89 days)	IV Iba, **V San Fernando**		
310		Emmanuel Treveno Cabajar	183 DJ1° 200	14 Aug 2004 (22 years, 87 days)	IV Pagadian		
311		Bernardino Cruz Cortez	DJ1° 196 269	20 Aug 2004 (22 years, 81 days)	Manila (auxiliary), IV Infanta		
312		Reynaldo Gonda Evangelista^{‡}	DJ1° 269 217	26 Jan 2005 (21 years, 287 days)	III Boac, **V Imus**		
313		Mylo Hubert Claudio Vergara^{‡}	196 287 253	30 Apr 2005 (21 years, 193 days)	III San Jose, **II Pasig**		
314		José Rojas Rojas, Jr.^{‡}	DJ1° DK1 205	15 Sep 2005 (21 years, 55 days)	Cáceres (auxiliary), **II Libmanan**		
315		Jacinto Agcaoili Jose	DJ1° 211 248	26 Nov 2005 (20 years, 348 days)	III Urdaneta		
316		Renato Pine Mayugba^{‡}	DJ1° 202 233	27 Dec 2005 (20 years, 317 days)	Lingayen-Dagupan (auxiliary), **VI Laoag**		
317		Roberto Calara Mallari^{‡}	183 292 287	27 Mar 2006 (20 years, 227 days)	San Fernando (auxiliary), IV San Jose, **IV Tarlac**		
318		Marlo Mendoza Peralta	183 202 220	31 Mar 2006 (20 years, 223 days)	Alaminos (coadjutor), II Alaminos, XXXVII Nueva Segovia		
319		José Colin Mendoza Bagaforo^{‡}	223 199 222	25 Apr 2006 (20 years, 198 days)	Cotabato (auxiliary), **VI Kidapawan**		
320		Rodolfo Fontiveros Beltran	240 233 279	16 May 2006	IV Bontoc-Lagawe, V San Fernando de La Union		
321		George Beluso Rimando	199 281 226	25 May 2006 (20 years, 168 days)	**Davao (auxiliary)**		
322		Pablo Virgilio Siongco David*^{‡}	196 214 222	10 Jul 2006 (20 years, 122 days)	San Fernando (auxiliary), **II Kalookan**		
323		Broderick Soncuaco Pabillo^{‡}	196 DL1° 276	19 Aug 2006 (20 years, 82 days)	Manila (auxiliary), **II Taytay**		
324		Elenito de los Reyes Galido	196 270 254	8 Sep 2006	IV Iligan		
325		Leopoldo Corpuz Jaucian	196 DL1° 268	26 Mar 2007 (19 years, 228 days)	IV Bangued		
326		Ricardo Lingan Baccay^{‡}	DL1° 240 279	10 Apr 2007 (19 years, 213 days)	Tuguegarao (auxiliary), III Alaminos, **VIII Tuguegarao**		
327		Gilbert Armea Garcera^{‡}	205 261 223	29 Jun 2007 (19 years, 133 days)	III Daet, **VIII Lipa**		
328		Julius Sullan Tonel^{‡}	199 281 278	20 Aug 2007 (19 years, 81 days)	III Ipil, **VII Zamboanga**		
329		Francisco Mendoza de Leon	196 292 227	1 Sep 2007 (19 years, 69 days)	Antipolo (auxiliary), Antipolo (coadjutor), IV Antipolo		
330		Crispin Barrete Varquez^{‡}	250 288 285	18 Oct 2007 (19 years, 22 days)	VI Borongan, **VIII Tagbilaran**		
331		Gerardo Alimane Alminaza^{‡}	DM1° 222 216	4 Aug 2008 (18 years, 97 days)	Jaro (auxiliary), **III San Carlos**		
332		Joseph Amangi Nacua	240 281 328	19 Aug 2008	IV Ilagan		

=== 2010s and beyond (2010-present) ===
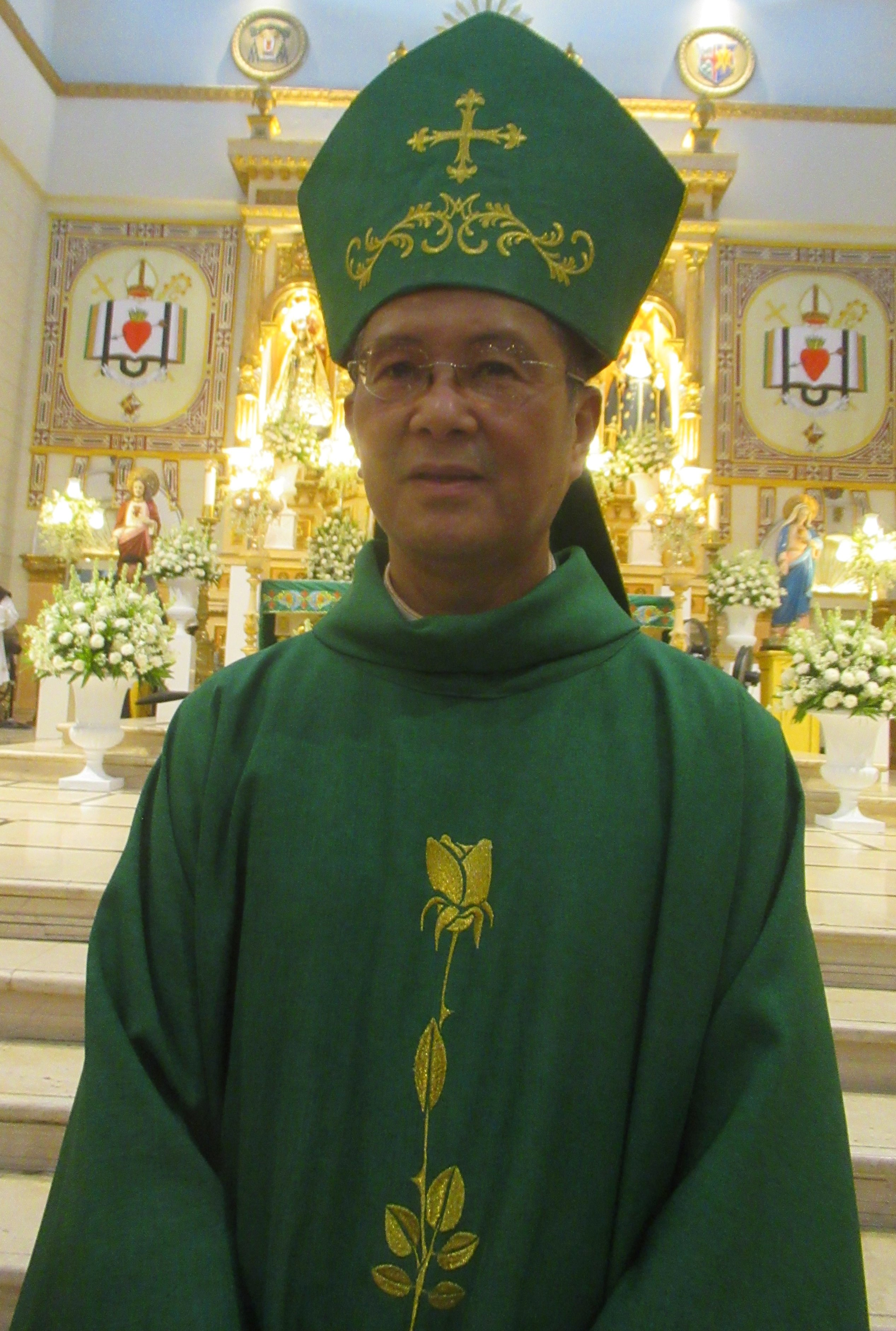
Ruperto Cruz Santos (334) is the current Bishop of Antipolo.

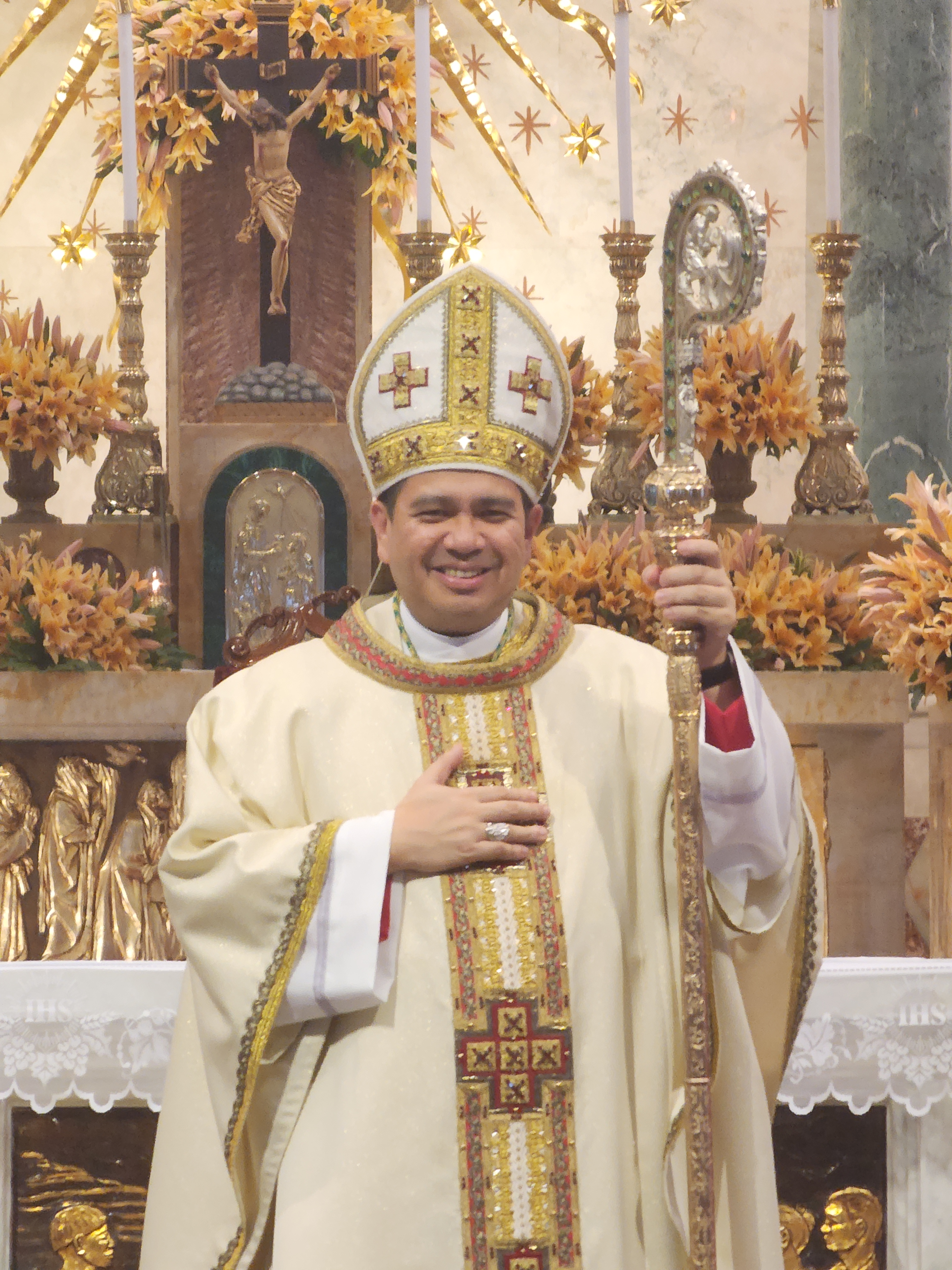
Rufino Sescon Jr. (385) is the current Bishop of Balanga.

No.	Picture	Bishop	Consecrators	Date	Diocese	Coat of arms	Ref
333		José Araneta Cabantan^{‡}	DM1° 278 270	30 Apr 2010 (16 years, 193 days)	IV Malaybalay, **V Cagayan de Oro**		
334		Ruperto Cruz Santos^{‡}	196 183 DM1°	24 Jun 2010 (16 years, 138 days)	IV Balanga, **V Antipolo**		
335		José Salmorin Bantolo	222 306 237	22 Aug 2011	**III Masbate**		
336		David William Valencia Antonio^{‡}	DN1° 248 223	26 Aug 2011 (15 years, 75 days)	Nueva Segovia (auxiliary), V Ilagan, **XXXVIII Nueva Segovia**		
337		Narciso Villaver Abellana^{‡}	292 317 291	11 Dec 2013 (12 years, 333 days)	**V Romblon**		
338		Daniel Patrick Yee Parcon^{‡}	285 293 331	22 Aug 2014 (12 years, 79 days)	**II Talibon**		
339		Severo Cagátan Caérmare^{‡}	DN1° 254 333	30 Oct 2014 (12 years, 10 days)	**III Dipolog**		
340		Marcelino Antonio Malabanan Maralit^{‡}	196 295 269 DN1°	13 Mar 2015 (11 years, 241 days)	IV Boac, **V San Pablo**		
341		Valentin Cabbigat Dimoc^{‡}	318 DN1° 320	4 Aug 2015 (11 years, 97 days)	**V Bontoc-Lagawe**		
342		Dennis Cabanada Villarojo^{‡}	285 183 DN1°	10 Aug 2015 (11 years, 91 days)	Cebu (auxiliary), **V Malolos**		
343		Victor de la Cruz Ocampo	295 DN1° 334	29 Aug 2015	III Gumaca		
344		Oscar Jaime Llaneta Florencio^{‡}	283 DN1° 285	4 Sep 2015 (11 years, 66 days)	Cebu (auxiliary), **VII Military Ordinariate**		
345		Enrique de Vera Macaraeg	292 242 320	24 May 2016	III Tarlac		
346		Jose Elmer Imas Mangalinao^{‡}	292 291 242	22 Aug 2016 (10 years, 79 days)	Lingayen-Dagupan (auxiliary), **III Bayombong**		
347		Alberto Sy Uy^{‡}	295 285 338	5 Jan 2017 (9 years, 308 days)	VII Tagbilaran, **XXV Cebu**		
348		Victor Barnuevo Bendico^{‡}	318 267 293	10 Jan 2017 (9 years, 303 days)	VI Baguio, **IV Capiz**		
349		Socrates Calamba Mesiona^{‡}	196 282 301	10 Feb 2017 (9 years, 272 days)	**VI Puerto Princesa**		
350		Danilo Bangayan Ulep^{‡}	297 318 251	29 Jul 2017 (9 years, 103 days)	**V Batanes**		
351		Mel Rey Mingoa Uy^{‡}	293 327 337	8 Nov 2017 (9 years, 1 day)	**V Lucena**		
352		Rex Cullingham Ramirez^{‡}	295 DO1° 283	9 Jan 2018 (8 years, 304 days)	**II Naval**		
353		Abel Cahiles Apigo^{‡}	281 290 328	24 Apr 2018 (8 years, 199 days)	II Mati, **V Davao**		
354		Bartolome Gaspar Santos^{‡}	295 309 289	30 Apr 2018 (8 years, 193 days)	**V Iba**		
355		Louie Patalinghug Galbines^{‡}	196 306 303	28 May 2018 (8 years, 165 days)	III Kabankalan, **VII Bacolod**		
356		Medil Sacay Aseo^{‡}	281 226 DP1	20 Jun 2018 (8 years, 142 days)	**IV Tagum**		
357		Raúl Bautista Dáel^{‡}	295 278 294	7 Jun 2018 (8 years, 125 days)	**III Tandag**		
358		Cerilo Uy Casicas^{‡}	223 281 224	11 Jul 2018 (8 years, 121 days)	**IV Marbel**		
359		Daniel Oca Presto^{‡}	309 DO1° 354	30 Jul 2018 (8 years, 102 days)	**VI San Fernando de La Union**		
360		Nolly Camingue Buco^{‡}	329 344 315	8 Sep 2018 (8 years, 62 days)	Antipolo (auxiliary), **III Catarman**		
361		Ronald Ignacio Lunas	290 298 310	11 Feb 2019	V Pagadian		
362		Rex Andrew Clement Alarcon^{‡}	273 DK1 272	19 Mar 2019 (7 years, 235 days)	IV Daet, **XXXIV Cáceres**		
363		Marvyn Abrea Maceda^{‡}	283 352 229	2 Apr 2019 (7 years, 221 days)	**V San Jose de Antique**		
364		Fidelis Bautista Layog	292 316 345	8 May 2019 (7 years, 185 days)	**Lingayen-Dagupan (auxiliary)**		
365		Leo Magdugo Dalmao^{‡}	257 298 281	24 May 2019 (7 years, 169 days)	**IV Isabela**		
366		Cosme Damian Racines Almedilla^{‡}	278 333 338	25 Jun 2019 (7 years, 137 days)	**III Butuan**		
367		Jose Ramirez Rapadas III^{‡}	328 333 347	20 Aug 2019 (7 years, 81 days)	**V Iligan**		
368		Roberto Orendain Gaa^{‡}	295 292 313	22 Aug 2019 (7 years, 79 days)	**III Novaliches**		
369		Midyphil Bermejo Billones^{‡}	306 285 222	27 Aug 2019 (7 years, 74 days)	Cebu (auxiliary), **XIV Jaro**		
370		Jose Alan Verdejo Dialogo^{‡}	295 196 282	12 Dec 2019 (6 years, 332 days)	**V Sorsogon**		
371		Charlie Malapitan Inzon^{‡}	284 223 319	21 May 2020 (6 years, 172 days)	VI Jolo, **V Cotabato**		
372		Moises Magpantay Cuevas^{‡}	257 298 328	24 Aug 2020 (6 years, 77 days)	Zamboanga (auxiliary), **VI Calapan**		
373		Noel Portal Pedregosa^{‡}	333 284 357	14 Sep 2021 (5 years, 56 days)	**V Malaybalay**		
374		Ruben Caballero Labajo^{‡}	285 DQ1° 342	19 Aug 2022 (4 years, 82 days)	Cebu (auxiliary), **I Prosperidad**		
375		Pablito Martinez Tagura^{‡}	295 DQ1° 327	17 Feb 2023 (3 years, 265 days)	**III San Jose in Mindoro**		
376		Napoleon Balili Sipalay, Jr.^{‡}	292 364 315	18 Mar 2024 (2 years, 236 days)	**IV Alaminos**		
377		Luisito Audal Occiano^{‡}	273 362 DK1	21 Jun 2024 (2 years, 111 days)	**III Virac**		
378		Rafael Tambao-an Cruz^{‡}	292 348 280	7 Sep 2024 (2 years, 63 days)	**VII Baguio**		
379		Elias Lumayog Ayuban, Jr.^{‡}	293 287 347	3 Dec 2024 (1 year, 341 days)	**II Cubao**		
380		Euginius Longakit Cañete^{‡}	322 334 285	28 Dec 2024 (1 year, 316 days)	**IV Gumaca**		
381		Rufino Coronel Sescon Jr.^{‡}	292 287 334	25 Feb 2025 (1 year, 257 days)	**V Balanga**		
382		Herman Guinto Abcede^{‡}	362 327 280	1 May 2025 (1 year, 192 days)	**V Daet**		
383		Glenn Montebon Corsiga^{‡}	328 283 297	29 Jul 2025 (1 year, 103 days)	**IV Ipil**		
384		Ronald Anthony Parco Timoner^{‡}	298 362 327	13 Aug 2025 (1 year, 88 days)	**VI Pagadian**		
385		Dave Dean Capucao^{‡}	DQ1° 311 273	5 Sep 2025 (1 year, 65 days)	**V Infanta**		
386		Edwin Oracion Panergo^{‡}	327 351 243	1 Dec 2025 (343 days)	**V Boac**		
387		Samuel Naceno Agcaracar^{‡}	295 DQ1° 375	17 Jan 2026 (296 days)	**V San Jose**		
388		Cyril Buhayan Villareal^{‡}	348 305 337	23 Apr 2026 (200 days)	**V Kalibo**		
-		Gerardo Fortich Saco Jr. (Note: Withdrew on 5 May 2026 before his ordination on 26 May 2026.)		25 Mar 2026	VIII Tagbilaran (elect)		
389		Sean Buslig Mejia^{‡}	DQ1° 326 304	2 Jun 2026 (160 days)	**III Tabuk**		
390		Nick Argel Vaquilar^{‡}	223 318 315	21 Jul 2026 (111 days)	**IV Urdaneta**		

== Abbreviations and notes ==
=== Foreign consecrators ===
- AA=Bishop of Tlaxcala
- AB=Archbishop of Mexico
- AC=Archbishop of Seville
- AD=Bishop of Michoacán
- AE=Titular Bishop of Calydon
- AF=Bishop of Macau
- AG=Bishop of Trujillo
- AH=Titular Bishop of Sinopoli
- AI=Titular Archbishop of Pharsalus
- AJ=Titular Bishop of Botrys
- AK=Titular Bishop of Constantia in Arabia
- AL=Titular Bishop of Miletopolis
- AM=Titular Archbishop of Tyana
- AN=Patriarch of West Indies
- AO=Titular Archbishop of Traianopolis in Rhodope
- AP=Titular Bishop of Theveste
- AQ=Archbishop of Zaragoza
- AR=Bishop of Ávila
- AS=Archbishop of Toledo
- AT=Bishop of Pamplona(-Tudela)
- AU=Titular Bishop of Byblus
- AV=Titular Archbishop of Heraclea in Europa
- AW=Archbishop of Burgos
- AX=Bishop of Lugo
- AY=Titular Archbishop of Nazianzus
- AZ=Archbishop of Valladolid
- BA=Bishop of Salamanca
- BB=Cardinal-Priest of Santa Maria sopra Minerva
- BC=Bishop of Oviedo
- BD=Titular Bishop of Tamasus
- BE=Cardinal-Bishop of Frascati
- BF=Titular Archbishop of Caesarea in Palaestina
- BG=Titular Archbishop of Nicopolis in Epiro
- BH=Cardinal-Priest of Sant’Agostino
- BI=Titular Archbishop of Constantia in Scythia
- BJ=Titular Bishop of Troas
- BK=Titular Archbishop of Laodicea in Phrygia
- BL=Titular Archbishop of Tyana
- BM=Titular Archbishop of Melitene
- BN=Titular Archbishop of Palmyra
- BO=Titular Archbishop of Larissa in Thessalia
- BP=Bishop of Erie
- BQ=Titular Bishop of Scilium
- BR=Bishop of Saint Augustine
- BS=Bishop of Little Rock
- BT=Bishop of Mobile
- BU=Archbishop of Tuam
- BV=Bishop of Galway and Kilmacduagh
- BW=Bishop of Elphin
- BX=Bishop of Fort Wayne
- BY=Bishop of Grand Rapids
- BZ=Bishop of La Crosse
- CA=Titular Bishop of Azotus
- CB=Titular Archbishop of Dramas
- CC=Bishop of ’s Hertogenbosch (Bois-le-Duc)
- CC=Bishop of Breda
- CE=Titular Bishop of Azotus
- CF=Archbishop of New York
- CG=Titular Bishop of Eumenia
- CH=Titular Bishop of Heliopolis in Phoenicia
- CI=Titular Archbishop of Myra
- CJ=Titular Archbishop of Dara
- CK=Archbishop of Fuzhou
- CL=Bishop of Hong Kong
- CM=Bishop of Meath
- CN=Bishop of Nancheng
- CO=Titular Bishop of Sebela
- CP=Archbishop of Philadelphia
- CQ=Titular Bishop of Sassura
- CR=Titular Archbishop of Perge
- CS=Bishop of Yuanling
- CT=Titular Bishop of Lete
- CU=Titular Archbishop of Iustinianopolis in Galatia
- CV=Bishop of Buffalo
- CW=Titular Bishop of Cotenna
- CX=Archbishop of Utrecht
- CY=Archbishop of Armagh
- CZ=Titular Archbishop of Malliana
- DA=Archbishop Emeritus of Bangalore
- DB=Titular Archbishop of Thagora
- DC=Titular Archbishop of Maura
- DD=Titular Bishop of Sutunurca
- DE=Titular Archbishop of Forum Novum
- DF=Titular Archbishop of Cadi
- DG=Titular Archbishop of Tharros
- DH=Titular Archbishop of Turris in Mauretania
- DI=Titular Archbishop of Apollonia
- DJ=Titular Archbishop of Gallesium
- DK=Titular Archbishop of Montecorvino
- DL=Titular Archbishop of Volturnum
- DM=Titular Archbishop of Scala
- DN=Titular Archbishop of Pandosia
- DO=Titular Archbishop of Sepino
- DP=Bishop of Greensburg
- DQ=Titular Archbishop of Aquileia

=== Other abbreviations ===
- F=Priest who was not a bishop
- F(#)=Priest who was not a bishop but was consecrated bishop later
- PP=Pope

== See also ==
- Historical list of the Catholic bishops of the United States
- List of Catholic bishops in the Philippines
