= Cesar C. Raval =

Filipino Roman Catholic bishop

Cesar Castro Raval S.V.D.
- Bishop of Bangued
- Church: Catholic Church
- Diocese: Diocese of Bangued
- In office: 25 November 1988 – 18 January 1992
- Predecessor: Odilo Etspueler
- Successor: Artemio Lomboy Rillera
- Previous posts: Titular Bishop of Cerbali (1981-1988); Auxiliary Bishop of Bangued (1981-1988)

Orders
- Ordination: 22 May 1952
- Consecration: 18 February 1982 by Bruno Torpigliani

Personal details
- Born: 17 December 1924 Laoag, Ilocos Norte, Insular Government of the Philippine Islands, Territory of the United States
- Died: 30 January 2017 (aged 92) Quezon City, National Capital Region, Philippines

Cesar Castro Raval, S.V.D. (17 December 1924 – 30 January 2017) was a Catholic bishop.

Ordained to the priesthood in 1952, Raval served as auxiliary bishop of the Roman Catholic Diocese of Bangued, Philippines from 1981 to 1988. He then served as diocesan bishop for the Bangued Diocese from 1988 to 1992.
