= Leopoldo Jaucian =

Filipino Catholic prelate (born 1960)

His Excellency, The Most Reverend Leopoldo C. Jaucian SVD, D.D.
- Bishop Emeritus of Bangued
- Province: Nueva Segovia
- See: Bangued
- Appointed: January 5, 2007
- Installed: March 31, 2007
- Term ended: November 7, 2026
- Predecessor: Artemio Lomboy Rillera
- Previous posts: Chairman, CBCP Episcopal Commission on Youth (2017–2019)

Orders
- Ordination: March 12, 1988 by Miguel Cinches
- Consecration: March 26, 2007 by Gaudencio Rosales

Personal details
- Born: Leopoldo Corpuz Jaucian; July 27, 1960 (age 66) Santa, Ilocos Sur, Philippines
- Denomination: Roman Catholic
- Education: Divine Word Academy, Urdaneta City; Christ the King Seminary, Quezon City; Divine Word School of Theology, Tagaytay; Fu Jen Catholic University, Taipei (Taiwan); De La Salle University, Manila
- Motto: Manete in me "Abide in Me" (John 15:5)

Ordination history
History
Priestly ordination
- Ordained by: Miguel Cinches
Episcopal consecration
- Principal consecrator: Gaudencio Rosales
- Co-consecrators: Fernando Filoni; Artemio Lomboy Rillera
- Styles
- Reference style: His Excellency; The Most Reverend
- Spoken style: Your Excellency
- Religious style: Bishop

Leopoldo Corpuz Jaucian (born July 27, 1960) is a Roman Catholic Bishop of the Philippines . He is the Bishop of Bangued in Abra (Philippines) from 2007 until his resignation in 2026.

== Biography ==
Leopoldo Corpuz Jaucian was born on July 27, 1960 in Santa, Ilocos Sur, Philippines, as the first child of Ernesto Ballesteros Jaucian Sr. and Veronica Bello Corpuz. He has three brothers and three sisters. Having found themselves transferring from one place to another due to the work of his father, Jaucian's family eventually settled in Urdaneta City, Pangasinan, where he came to know the Divine Word Society (SVD), which has a Secondary School Institution in this city - the Divine Word Academy of Urdaneta (now Divine Word College). Jaucian took his high school studies in this academy, after which, in 1976, he went to work as a sacristan at the SVD's Christ the King Seminary, in Quezon City. It was while having this work that he discovered his vocation to the priesthood, and expressed his intention to join the Divine Word Society.

As a full-fledged SVD seminarian and postulant he studied philosophy at the Christ the King Seminary from 1977 to 1979. Later, he underwent the order's novitiate program in Tagaytay (1979 to 1981).

In 1982, after his novitiate, he was chosen to study Chinese language and culture. Thus, he was sent to Taiwan for the Overseas Training Program, from 1982 to 1984. it was in Taipei where he finished his theological formation in 1987, at the Fu Jen Catholic University.

== Ministry as a priest ==
Jaucian was ordained to the priesthood, on March 12, 1988, at the Divine Word College Chapel in Urdaneta City, by Bishop Miguel Cinches, who is also a member of the Divine Word Society.

After ordination, the new priest went back to Taiwan, where he worked as assistant pastor at the St. Joseph the Worker Parish in Chiayi for one year. He also served as a campus minister at the Fu Jen Catholic University for three years (1989-1992).

After his stint in Taiwan, Jaucian returned to the Philippines in 1992. In Manila, he studied Guidance and Counselling at the De La Salle University. He was also assisting at the St. Jude Catholic Parish and Archdiocesan Shrine near the Malacañang Palace. In 1995, he finished his master's degree at the said university.

From 1995 to 2000, he was assigned at the St. Jude Catholic School, with responsibilities varying from being Campus Minister, Assistant Principal and Assistant Director. In 2000, he was appointed parish priest of the Shrine. Concurrently, he was also given the responsibility as the Superior of the SVD Manila District, and as Vicar Forane of the Vicariate of San Jose de Trozo of the Archdiocese of Manila.

In January 2005, he was elected as SVD's Provincial Superior for the Philippine Central Province.

== Bishop of Bangued ==
Pope Benedict XVI named Leopoldo Jaucian as Bishop of the Diocese of Bangued, Abra, on January 5, 2007. He received his episcopal ordination, on March 26 of that year by Cardinal Gaudencio Rosales, together with Bishop Artemio Rillera and Archbishop Fernando Filoni, and installed on March 31, 2007.

In November 7, 2026, Pope Leo XIV accepted his resignation as Bishop of Bangued.

== See also ==
- Roman Catholic Church in the Philippines

Catholic Church titles
Preceded by Artemio Lomboy Rillera	Bishop of Bangued; March 31, 2007 – November 7, 2026	Succeeded by Sede vacante
