= Felipe Fernandez de Pardo =

Roman Catholic prelate

Most Reverend Felipe Fernandez de Pardo
- Archbishop of Manila
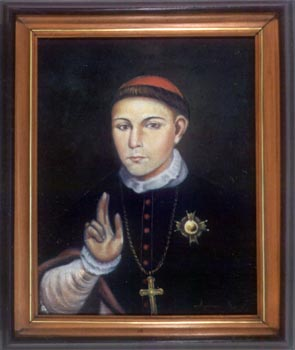
- Church: Catholic Church
- Diocese: Roman Catholic Archdiocese of Manila
- In office: 1680–1689
- Predecessor: Juan López
- Successor: Diego Camacho y Ávila

Orders
- Ordination: February 10, 1663
- Consecration: September 9, 1650 by Diego de Aguilar

Personal details
- Born: February 1611 Valladolid, Spain
- Died: December 31, 1689 (age 78)

Felipe Fernandez de Pardo, O.P. (February 1611 – December 31, 1689) was a Roman Catholic prelate who served as Archbishop of Manila (1680–1689).

== Biography ==
Felipe Fernandez de Pardo was born in Valladolid, Spain and was ordained a priest in the Order of Preachers. He served as Rector Magnificus of the University of Santo Tomas for two consecutive terms from 1652 to 1656. On January 8, 1680, Pope Innocent XI appointed him Archbishop of Manila. On October 28, 1681, he was consecrated bishop by Diego de Aguilar, Bishop of Cebu with Ginés Barrientos, Auxiliary Bishop of Manila, serving as co-consecrator and assisted by Father Andrés González. He served as Archbishop of Manila until his death on December 31, 1689.

While bishop, he was the Principal Consecrator of Andrés González, Bishop of Nueva Caceres (1686).

== External links and additional sources ==
- Cheney, David M. "Archdiocese of Manila". Catholic-Hierarchy.org. (for Chronology of Bishops) ^{[self-published]}
- Chow, Gabriel. "Metropolitan Archdiocese of Manila". GCatholic.org. (for Chronology of Bishops) ^{[self-published]}

Catholic Church titles
Preceded by Juan López	Archbishop of Manila; 1680–1689	Succeeded by Diego Camacho y Ávila
Academic offices
Preceded by Jeronimo de Zamora	Rector Magnificus of the University of Santo Tomas; 1652–1654, 1654–1656	Succeeded by Francisco de Paula
