= Ginés Barrientos =

Most Reverend Ginés Barrientos
- Auxiliary Bishop of Manila; Titular Bishop of Troas
- Church: Catholic Church
- Diocese: Roman Catholic Archdiocese of Manila
- In office: 1680–1698

Orders
- Consecration: 1681 by Manuel Fernández de Santa Cruz y Sahagún

Personal details
- Born: 1637 Barrueco Pardo Villa de Sayao, Spain
- Died: November 13, 1698 (age 61)

Ginés Barrientos, O.P. (1637 – November 13, 1698) was a Roman Catholic prelate who served as Auxiliary Bishop of Manila (1680-1698).

== Biography ==
Ginés Barrientos was born in Barrueco Pardo Villa de Sayao, Spain and ordained a priest in the Order of Preachers. On April 29, 1680, Pope Innocent XI, appointed him Auxiliary Bishop of Manila and Titular Bishop of Troas. In 1681, he was consecrated bishop by Manuel Fernández de Santa Cruz y Sahagún, Bishop of Tlaxcala. He served as Auxiliary Bishop of Manila until his death on November 13, 1698.

== Episcopal succession ==
While bishop, he was the principal co-consecrator of:

- Felipe Fernandez de Pardo, Archbishop of Manila (1681); and
- Andrés González, Bishop of Nueva Caceres (1686).

== See also ==
- Catholic Church in the Philippines
