= Antonio de San Gregorio =

Roman Catholic prelate (??–1661)

Most Reverend Antonio de San Gregorios
- Bishop Elect of Nueva Caceres
- Church: Catholic Church
- Diocese: Diocese of Nueva Caceres
- In office: 1659–1661
- Predecessor: Nicolás de Zaldívar y Zapata
- Successor: Andrés González

Personal details
- Died: 1661

Antonio de San Gregorio (died 1661) was a Roman Catholic prelate who was appointed as Bishop of Nueva Caceres, Philippines from 1659 to 1661.

== Biography ==
Antonio de San Gregorio was ordained a priest in the Order of Friars Minor. On 17 November 1659, he was appointed during the papacy of Pope Alexander VII as Bishop of Nueva Caceres. He died before he was consecrated in 1661.

== External links and additional sources ==
- Cheney, David M. "Archdiocese of Caceres (Nueva Caceres)". Catholic-Hierarchy.org. (for Chronology of Bishops) ^{[self-published]}
- Chow, Gabriel. "Metropolitan Archdiocese of Caceres (Philippines)". GCatholic.org. (for Chronology of Bishops) ^{[self-published]}

Catholic Church titles
Preceded by Nicolás de Zaldívar y Zapata	Bishop Elect of Nueva Caceres; 1659–1661	Succeeded by Andrés González
