= Guglielmo Piani =

Italian priest (1875–1956)

His Excellency Guglielmo Piani S.D.B.
- Titular Archbishop of Dramas
- Church: Roman Catholic

Orders
- Consecration: 14 May 1922 by Giovanni Cardinal Cagliero, S.D.B.

Personal details
- Born: September 16, 1875 Martinengo, Italy
- Died: September 27, 1956 (aged 81)
- Denomination: Roman Catholic
- Coat of arms

Guglielmo Piani, S.D.B. (16 September 1875 – 27 September 1956) also known as William Piani, was an Italian prelate of the Catholic Church who worked in the diplomatic service of the Holy See. He was Apostolic Delegate to the Philippines from 1922 to 1948 and then played a similar role in Mexico until his death in 1956.

== Biography ==
Guglielmo Piani was born on 16 September 1875 in Martinengo, Italy. He was ordained a priest of the Salesians of Don Bosco on 15 May 1898.

On 16 December 1921, Pope Benedict XV appointed him titular bishop of Palaeopolis in Pamphylia and auxiliary bishop of the Archdiocese of Puebla de los Ángeles. This was quickly revised because of intense conflict between the Church and the Mexican government, and on 17 March 1922 he was named titular archbishop of Dramas and Apostolic Delegate to the Philippines. He received his episcopal consecration in Rome on 14 May 1922.

His service in the Philippines was interrupted in 1936 when he visited Mexico as an Apostolic Visitor to develop an independent assessment of the ongoing conflict between the government and the Church. He arrived in June shortly after the death of Pascual Díaz y Barreto, Archbishop of Mexico, on 19 May 1936 and it fell to him to recommend a successor. (Note: The actual successor to Diaz was not Guillermo Tritschler y Córdova but Luis María Martínez.) He continued from Mexico to Rome on other business, and there he provided intelligence that led Pope Pius XI to address an encyclical to the bishops of Mexico that directed them to adopt a less confrontational posture. (Note: The encyclical was Nos es muy Conicida.)

On 5 October 1948, Pope Pius XII named him Apostolic Visitor to Mexico with the authority of Apostolic Delegate. He received the title of Apostolic Delegate to Mexico on 13 April 1951. (Note: Piani is identified as Delegate to Mexico on 31 June 1951.)

He still held that title when he died on 27 September 1956 at the age of 81.
