= Ramón Martínez Vigil =

Spanish bishop (1840–1904)

- Bishop of Oviedo
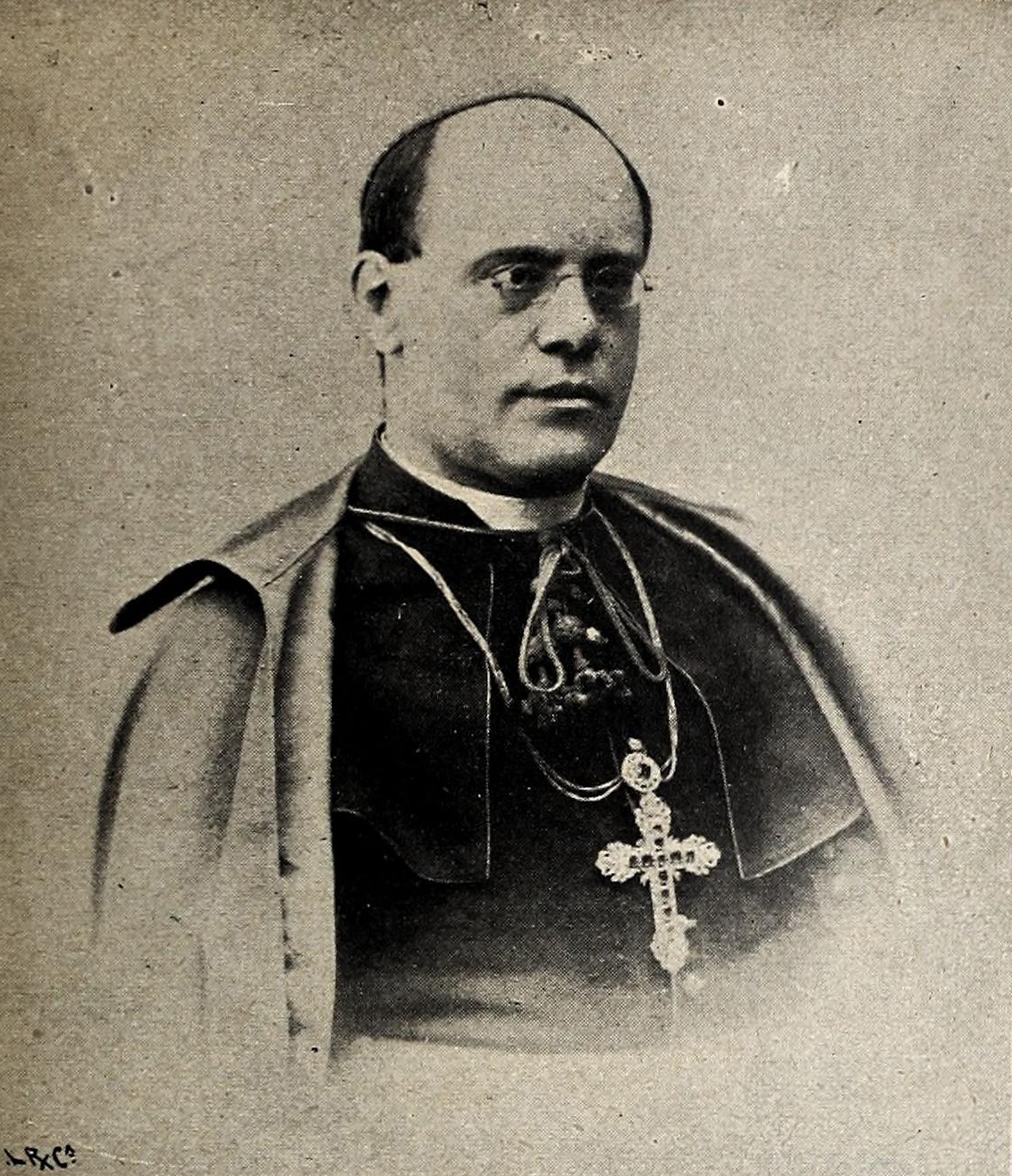
- Church: Catholic Church
- Diocese: Diocese of Oviedo
- In office: 27 March 1884 – 16 August 1904
- Predecessor: Sebastián Herrero y Espinosa de los Monteros
- Successor: Francisco Javier Baztán y Urniza

Orders
- Ordination: 17 January 1864
- Consecration: 1 June 1884 by Juan Ignacio Moreno y Maisanove

Personal details
- Born: 12 September 1840 Tiñana, Asturias, Spain
- Died: 17 August 1904 (aged 63)

Ramón Martínez Vigil (12 September 1840 – 17 August 1904) was a Spanish priest, bishop of Oviedo.
