= Andrés González (bishop) =

Spanish Roman Catholic bishop (1634–1709)

Most Reverend Andrés González
- Bishop of Nueva Caceres
- Church: Catholic Church
- Diocese: Diocese of Nueva Caceres
- In office: 1685–1709
- Predecessor: Antonio de San Gregorio
- Successor: Domingo de Valencia

Orders
- Consecration: 1686 by Felipe Fernandez de Pardo

Personal details
- Born: 1634 Villar de Frades, Spain
- Died: February 14, 1709 (aged 74–75)

Andrés González (1634 – February 14, 1709) was a Roman Catholic prelate who served as Bishop of Nueva Caceres (1685–1709).

== Biography ==
Andrés González was born in Villar de Frades, Spain and ordained a priest in the Order of Preachers. On September 10, 1685, Pope Innocent XI, appointed him Bishop of Nueva Caceres. In 1686, he was consecrated bishop by Felipe Fernandez de Pardo, Archbishop of Manila with Diego de Aguilar, Bishop of Cebu and Ginés Barrientos, Auxiliary Bishop of Manila as Co-Consecrators. He served as Bishop of Nueva Caceres until his death on February 14, 1709. Prior to becoming bishop, he assisted in the consecration of Felipe Fernandez de Pardo, Archbishop of Manila.

== External links and additional sources ==
- Cheney, David M. "Archdiocese of Caceres (Nueva Caceres)". Catholic-Hierarchy.org. (for Chronology of Bishops) ^{[self-published]}
- Chow, Gabriel. "Metropolitan Archdiocese of Caceres (Philippines)". GCatholic.org. (for Chronology of Bishops) ^{[self-published]}

Catholic Church titles
Preceded by Antonio de San Gregorio	Bishop of Nueva Caceres; 1685–1709	Succeeded by Domingo de Valencia
