= Ambrose Agius =

Maltese Catholic archbishop, Benedictine monk and diplomat (1856–1911)

His Excellency, The Most Reverend Ambrose Agius OSB
- Apostolic Delegate to the Philippines, Titular Archbishop of Palmyra
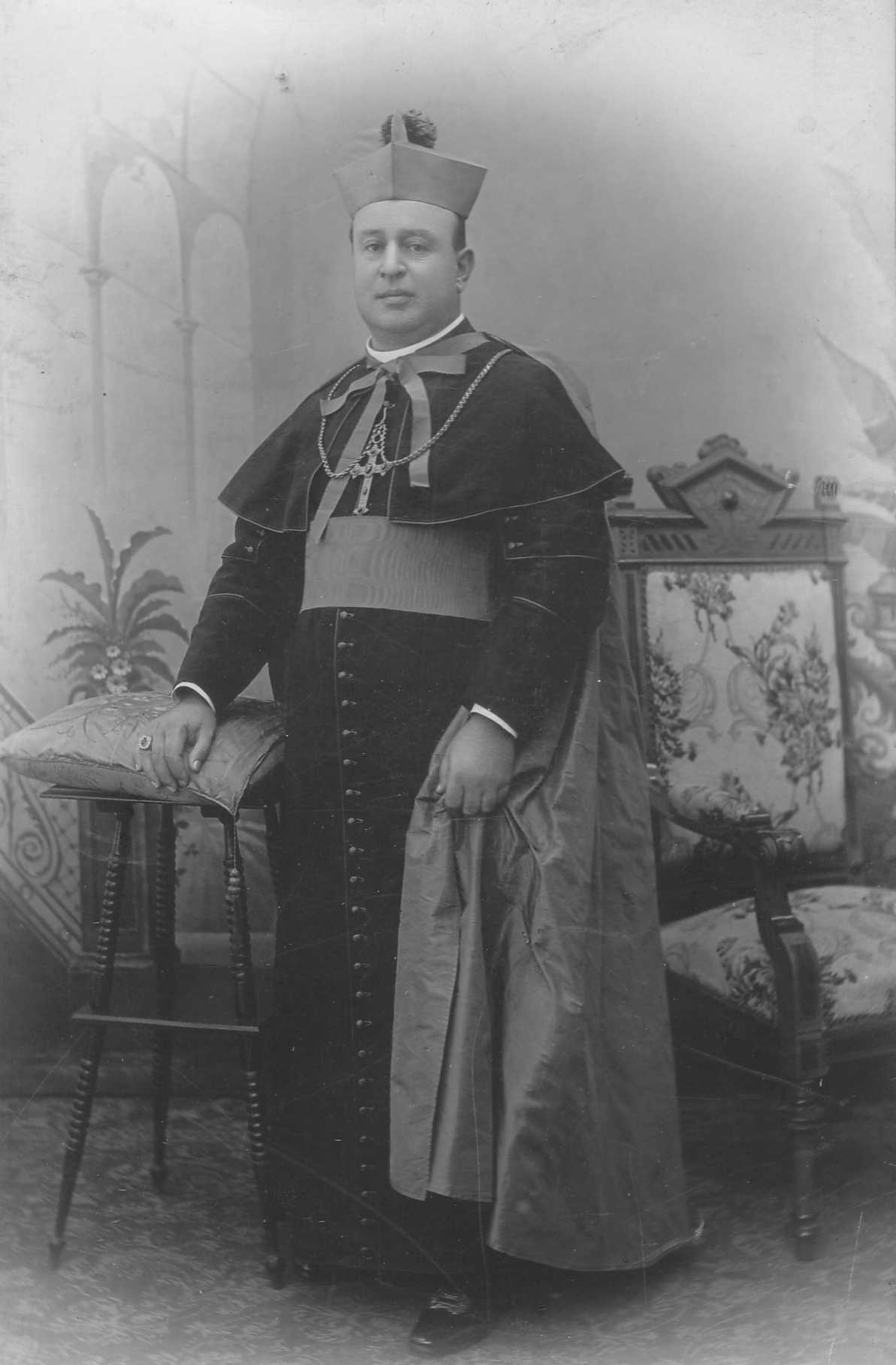
- Church: Catholic Church
- Appointed: 24 August 1904
- Term ended: 13 December 1911
- Predecessor: Jules-Basile Kandelaft
- Successor: Antonino Sardi

Orders
- Ordination: 16 October 1881
- Consecration: 18 September 1904 by Rafael Merry del Val

Personal details
- Born: Tancredi Alfred Agius; 17 September 1856 Alexandria, Khedivate of Egypt, Ottoman Empire
- Died: 13 December 1911 (aged 55) Manila, Philippine Islands
- Buried: Manila Cathedral, Philippines (1911–1945); Abbey of Our Lady of Montserrat, Philippines (1945–present)
- Parents: Tancredi Agius; Saveria Sammut
- Coat of arms

Ambrose Agius (born Tancredi Alfred Agius; 17 September 1856 – 13 December 1911) was a Maltese archbishop of the Catholic Church.

A member of the Benedictine Order, Agius was appointed the apostolic delegate to the Philippines by Pope Pius X in 1904. In 1907, Agius was delegated to canonically crown the image of Our Lady of La Naval de Manila. He founded the first Benedictine monastery in Malta and consecrated the first Filipino bishop of the Catholic Church.

== Early life ==
Agius was born on 17 September 1856, in the Egyptian city of Alexandria (then part of the Ottoman Empire), the second son and third child of a Maltese merchant named Tancredi Agius and his wife, Saveria Sammut. Tancredi's children were:

- Edward Agius: 1849–1924
- Giulia Agius: 1854–1932
- Tancredi Alfred: 1856–1911
- Edgar Agius: 1864–1935
- Robert Agius: 1868–1874

Agius was baptized as Tancredi Alfred Agius at Saint Catherine's Cathedral in Alexandria on 5 November 1856. He returned with his family to Malta during his early years. Agius attended the college operated by the monks of the Abbey of Saint Augustine in Ramsgate, Kent, England, where he was an outstanding student. After completing his studies in 1872, he felt called to join the abbey's monastic community. At his first profession of monastic vows, he was given the religious name Ambrose. On 12 October 1873, he professed his perpetual vows and was then sent by his abbot to Rome to complete his studies in philosophy and theology.

== Catholic priesthood ==
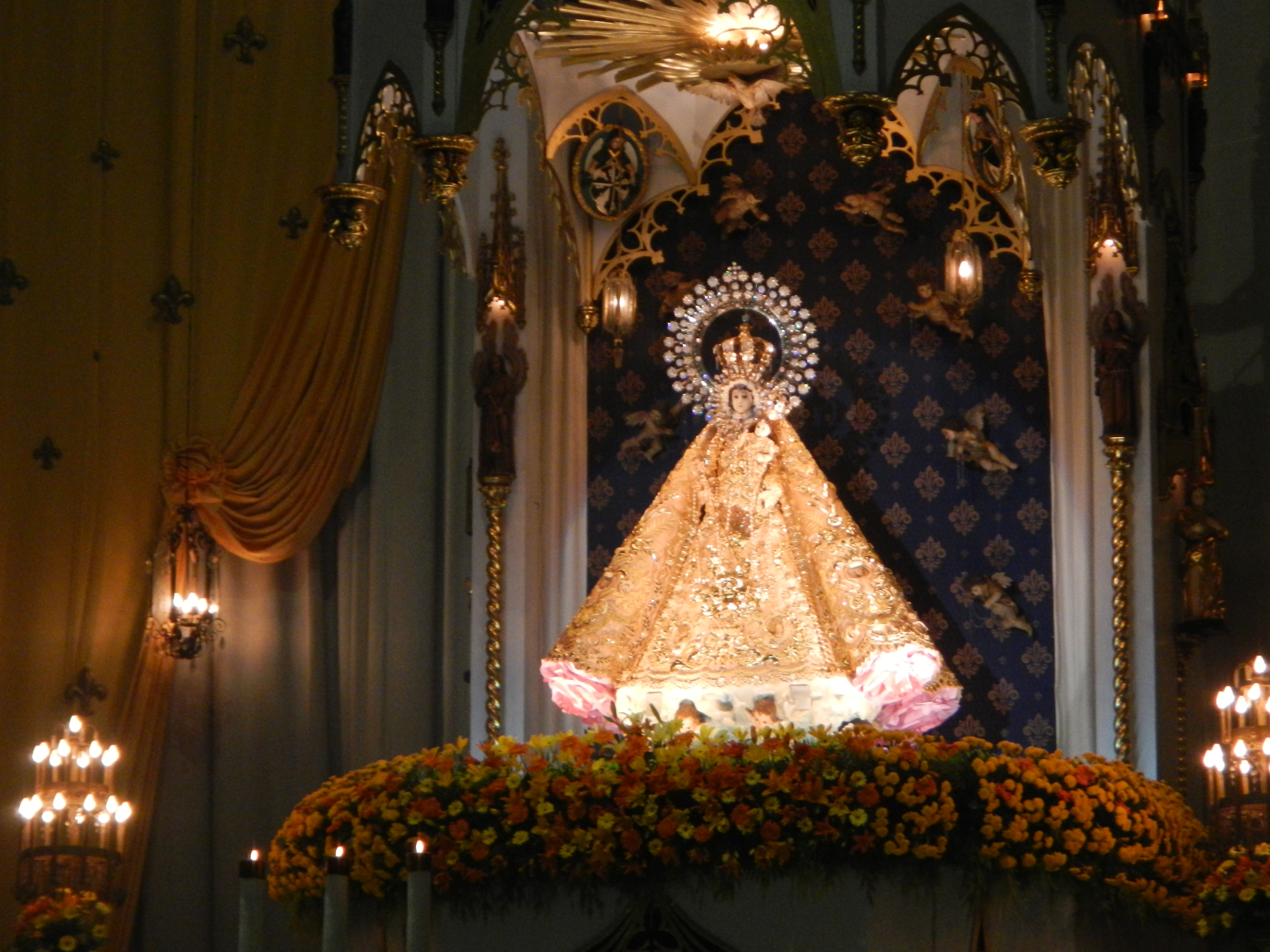
Agius crowned the image of Our Lady of La Naval de Manila.

Agius was ordained into the Catholic priesthood on 16 October 1881 at Subiaco Abbey.

He became deeply immersed in Maltese culture as he traveled extensively during his early years.

In May 1881, Agius was instructed by the Holy See to open the first Benedictine monastery in Malta. In December 1881, Agius, along with a group of Benedictine monks, settled in Nigret, Żurrieq. Under his supervision, a canonical religious community was established and a novitiate open to international candidates was set up; it was dedicated to the Immaculate Conception.

In 1884, the monastery was closed due to Italian-Maltese political turmoil, and Agius returned to Ramsgate to continue his mission. In 1893, he was appointed secretary to the procurator of the Subiaco Congregation by Pope Leo XIII.

== Appointment to the Philippines ==
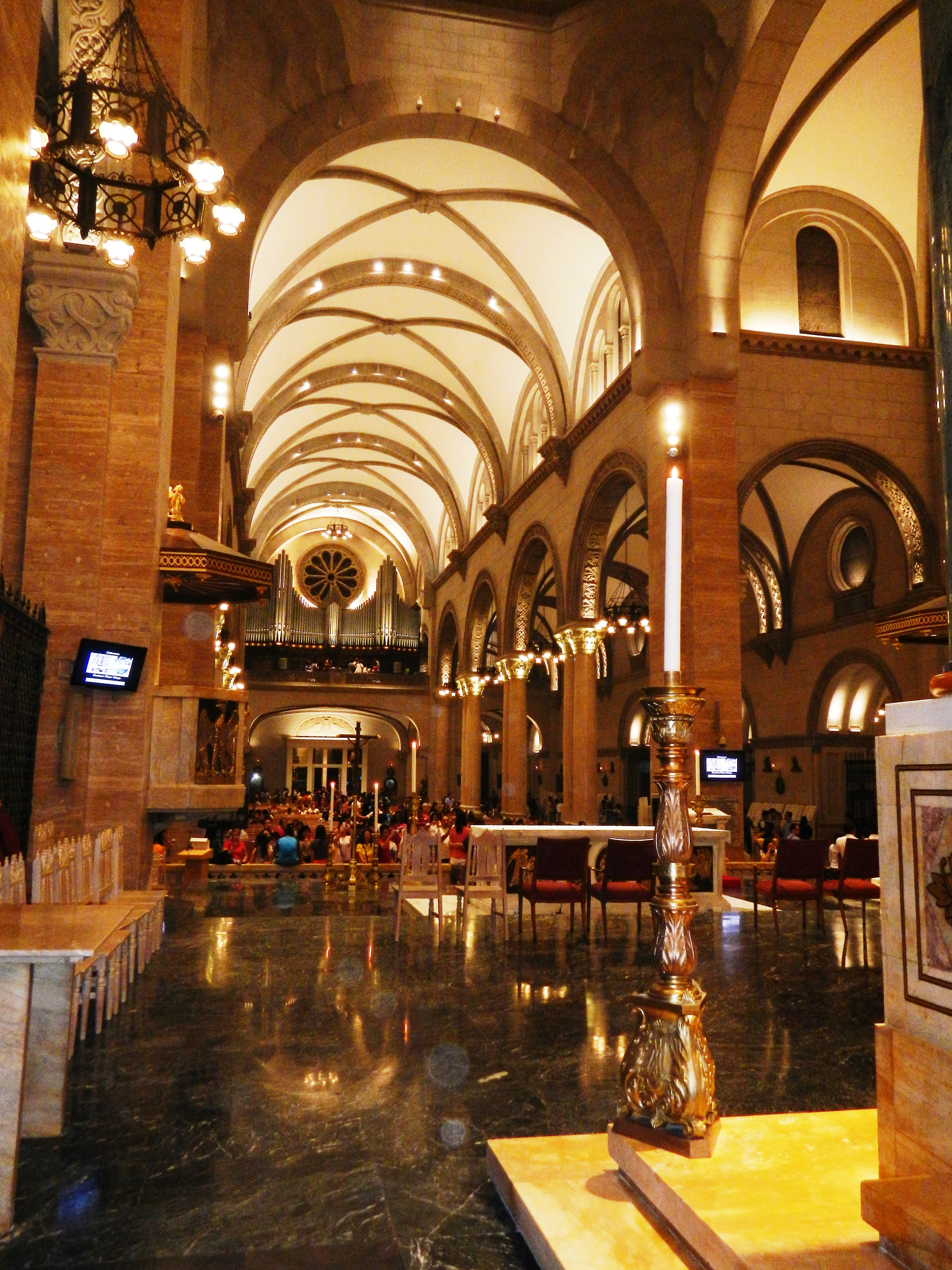
The interior of the Manila Cathedral, where the body of Agius was interred in the underground crypt until 1945.

On 24 August 1904, Pope Pius X appointed Agius as the apostolic delegate to the Philippines. He was appointed titular archbishop of Palmyra on 3 September 1904, and received his episcopal consecration on 18 September 1904, at Sant'Ambrogio della Massima in Rome by the cardinal secretary of state, Rafael Merry del Val. Upon his appointment, Agius donated his celebration funds to the impoverished parishioners of the Basilica of Sant'Ambrogio.

In the Philippines, Agius canonically crowned the ivory statue of Our Lady of the Most Holy Rosary of La Naval de Manila on 5 October 1907, representing Pope Pius X.

Agius convoked the 1907 Provincial Council of Manila with the other bishops of the nation at Manila Cathedral, re-dedicating the Philippines to the Immaculate Conception. This later became the country's official patroness under the pontificate of Pope Pius XII in September 1942.

As Filipinos were previously barred from priestly ordination and from joining religious orders under Spanish colonial rule, Agius ordained the first Filipino bishop in the Roman Catholic Church, Jorge Barlin Imperial, on 29 June 1906.

== Death and burial ==
In November 1911, Pope Pius appointed Agius as the new papal legate to the United States. While preparing to travel to Rome, he died of an acute attack of peritonitis on 13 December at 55 years of age. On 15 December 1911, Agius was given a solemn requiem Mass and was buried in the underground crypt of the Manila Cathedral. The tomb survived the destruction of the cathedral during the Battle of Manila in 1945. His remains were later set into a smaller casket and moved to a new grave inside the Abbey of Our Lady of Montserrat in Manila. The inscription translates as:

Ambrose Alfred Agius (1856–1911), Monk of Ramsgate, Titular Archbishop of Palmyra, Apostolic Delegate to the Islands, lies buried here; whose bones were formerly buried in the Cathedral basilica; which, destroyed by war, they were transferred to this Abbey church in the year 1945.

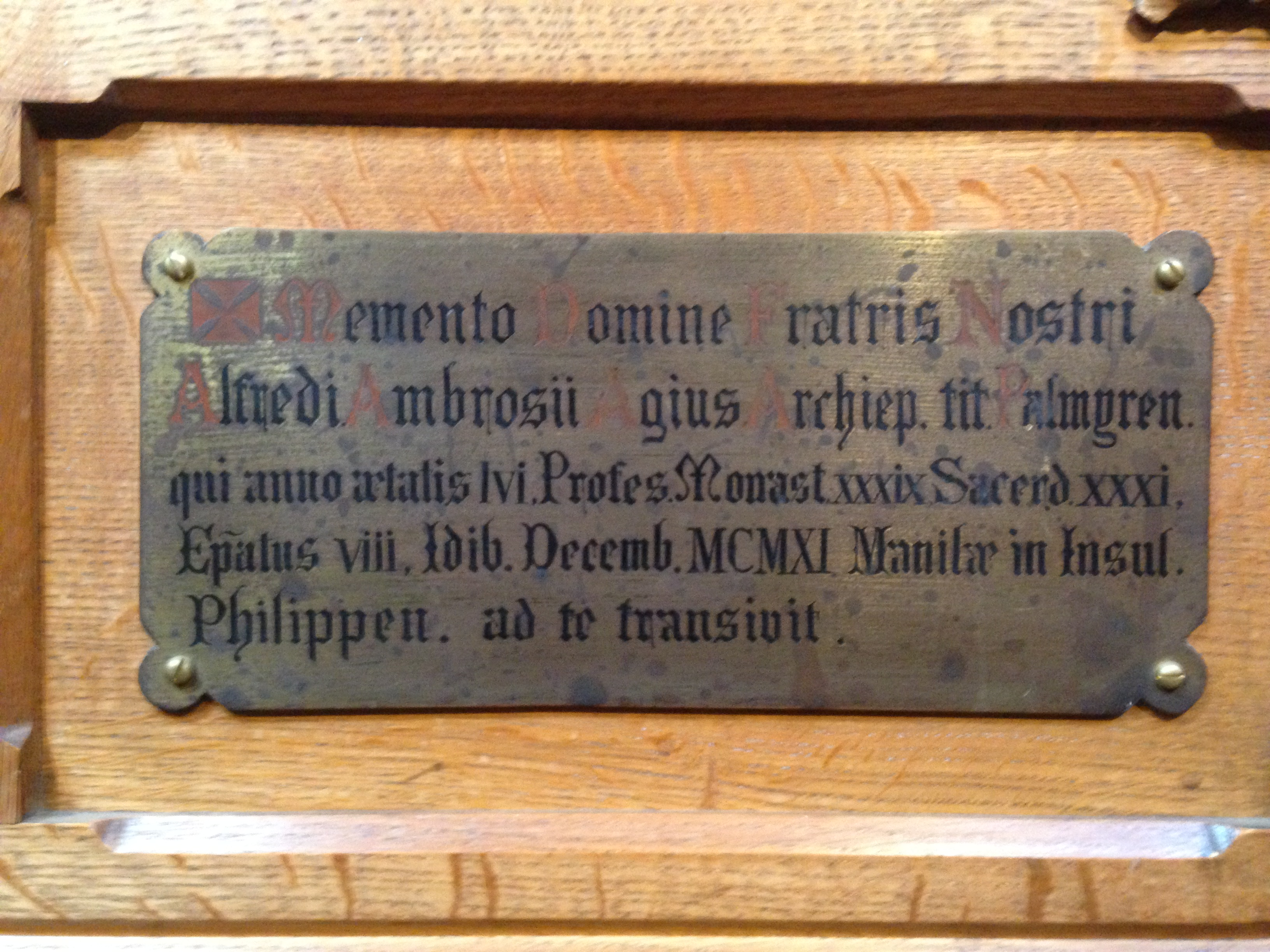
Memorial plaque in Saint Augustine's Church in Ramsgate, England.

A memorial plaque was added to those for the monks of Ramsgate Abbey in St Augustine's Church, Ramsgate, with an inscription that translates as:

Remember Lord, our brother Alfred Ambrose Agius, Titular Archbishop of Palmyra, who in the 56th year of his age, the 39th year of his Monastic Profession, the 31st year of his Priesthood, and the 8th year of his Episcopate, on the Ides [13th] of December 1911 in Manila in the Philippine Islands, crossed over to You.

== Names and titles ==
Agius was baptized as Tancredi Alfred Agius but was called "Alfredo" by his Italian-speaking parents and "Alfred" while at school in Ramsgate, according to a 1871 census. After taking his perpetual vows, Agius became known as Dom Ambrose, but he was commonly referred to as "Padre Ambrosio", "Padre Ambo", or "Father Dom" by the Filipino and Maltese faithful who knew him.

== See also ==
- Archdiocese of Manila
- History of religion in Malta

Catholic Church titles
Preceded by Giovanni Battista Guidi	Apostolic Delegate to the Philippines; 1902-1904	Succeeded by Giuseppe Petrelli
