= Diego de Aguilar (bishop) =

Most Reverend Diego de Aguilar
- Bishop of Cebu
- Church: Catholic Church
- Diocese: Diocese of Cebu
- In office: 1676–1692
- Predecessor: Juan López
- Successor: Miguel Bayot

Orders
- Consecration: November 14, 1677 by Payo Afán Enríquez de Ribera Manrique de Lara

Personal details
- Born: 1616 Medina de Río Seco, Spain
- Died: October 1, 1692 (aged 75–76)

Diego de Aguilar, O.P. (1616 – October 1, 1692) was a Roman Catholic prelate who served as Bishop of Cebu (1676–1692).

== Biography ==
Diego de Aguilar was born in Medina de Río Seco, Spain and ordained a priest in the Order of Preachers. On November 16, 1676 Pope Innocent XI, appointed him Bishop of Cebu. On November 14, 1677, he was consecrated bishop by Payo Afán Enríquez de Ribera Manrique de Lara, Archbishop of Mexico. He served as Bishop of Cebu until his death on October 1, 1692. While bishop, he was the principal consecrator of Felipe Fernandez de Pardo, Archbishop of Manila (1681), and the principal co-consecrator of Andrés González, Bishop of Nueva Caceres (1686).

== External links and additional sources ==
- Cheney, David M. "Archdiocese of Cebu". Catholic-Hierarchy.org. (for Chronology of Bishops) ^{[self-published]}
- Chow, Gabriel. "Metropolitan Archdiocese of Cebu". GCatholic.org. (for Chronology of Bishops) ^{[self-published]}

Catholic Church titles
Preceded by Juan López	Bishop Elect of Cebu; 1676–1692	Succeeded by Miguel Bayot
