= Giuseppe Petrelli =

Italian archbishop

His Excellency, The Most Reverend Giuseppe Petrelli
- Apostolic Nuncio to Peru; Titular Archbishop of Nisibis
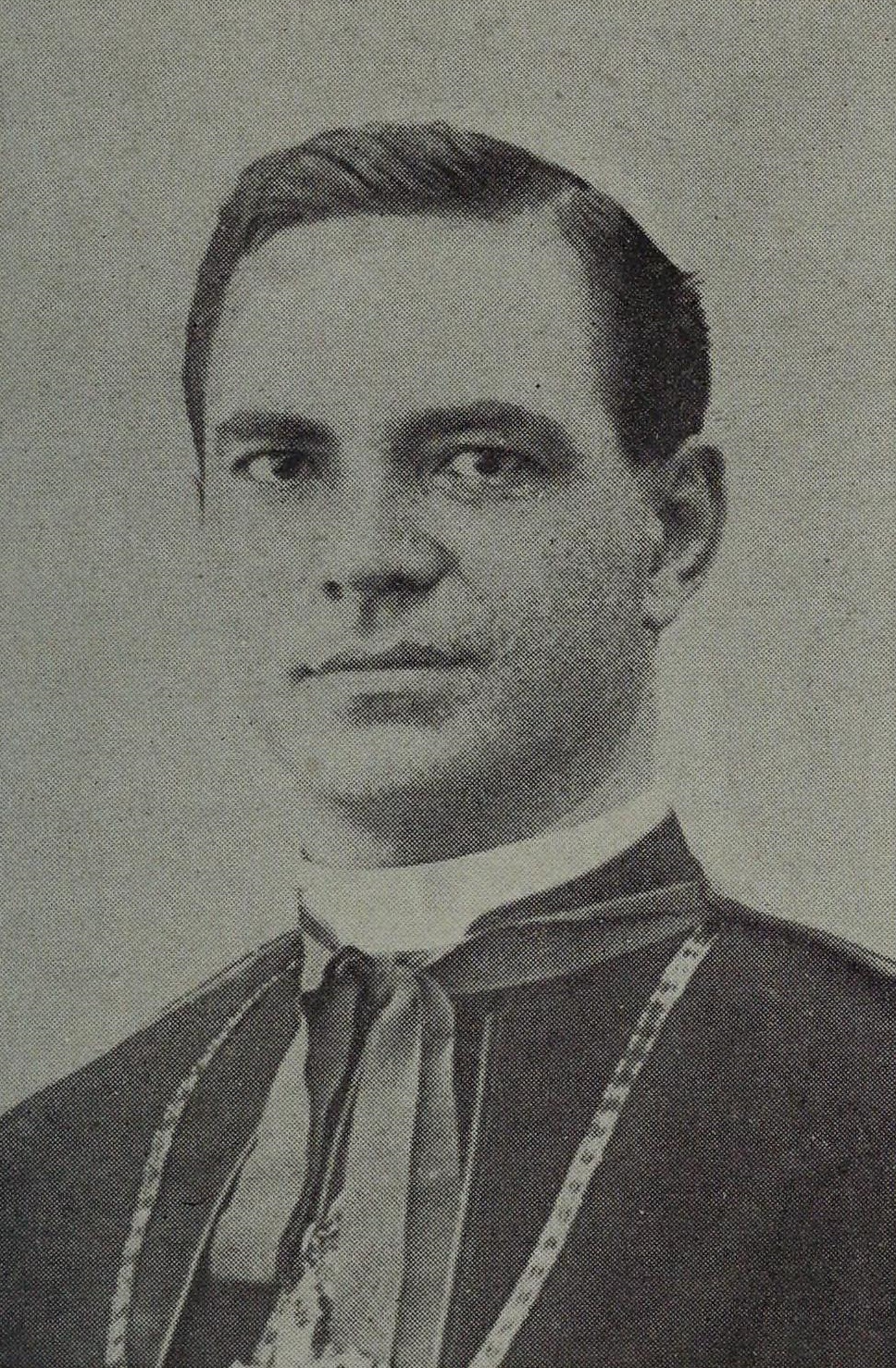
- Petrelli, c. 1910
- Appointed: 27 May 1921
- Predecessor: Lorenzo Lauri
- Other post: Titular Archbishop of Nisibis
- Previous posts: Bishop of Lipa (1910-1915); Apostolic Delegate to Philippines (1915-1921)

Orders
- Ordination: 10 August 1896
- Consecration: 12 June 1910 by Ambrose Agius

Personal details
- Born: Giuseppe Petrelli; February 14, 1873 Montegiorgio, Italy
- Died: April 29, 1962 (aged 89)
- Motto: Lux mea Dominus (The Lord is my light)
- Coat of arms

Styles of Giuseppe Petrelli
- Reference style: His Excellency; The Most Reverend
- Spoken style: Your Excellency
- Religious style: Archbishop

Giuseppe Petrelli (14 February 1873 – 29 April 1962) also known as José Petrelli and Joseph Petrelli, was an Italian prelate of the Catholic Church who served in the diplomatic service of the Holy See in the Philippines and in Peru.

== Biography ==
Giuseppe Petrelli was born on 14 February 1873 in Montegiorgio, Italy. He was ordained a priest on 10 August 1896.

He studied at the seminary in Fermo and at the Almo Collegio Capranica in Rome. In 1903 he went to the Philippines as secretary to apostolic delegation.

He was serving in that post when, on 12 April 1910, Pope Pius X appointed him bishop of the newly erected Diocese of Lipa.

He received his episcopal consecration on 12 June 1910 from Archbishop Ambrose Agius, Apostolic Delegate to the Philippines.

On 30 May 1915, Pope Benedict XV named him to succeed Agius as Apostolic Delegate to the Philippines and made him titular archbishop of Nisibis. In 1916–17 he visited Japan to investigate the state of religious freedom, granted by the Japanese constitution but in practice the government was intolerant of non-Shinto adherents. In 1918, when the Holy See and China agreed to exchange representatives, Petrelli was proposed as the pope's emissary, but objections from the French government, which had long exercised control over the Church in mission territories, prevented the exchange.

On 27 May 1921, Pope Benedict named him Apostolic Nuncio to Peru.

He resigned in 1925 at the age of 51.

Petrelli died on 29 April 1962 at the age of 89.
