= Bruno Torpigliani =

Italian prelate

- Apostolic Nuncio to the Philippines
- Church: Catholic Church
- In office: 6 June 1973 – April 1990
- Predecessor: Carmine Rocco
- Successor: Gian Vincenzo Moreni
- Other post: Titular Archbishop of Malliana (1964-1995)
- Previous posts: Apostolic Nuncio to the Democratic Republic of the Congo (1968-1973); Apostolic Nuncio to Guatemala & El Salvador (1964-1968)

Orders
- Ordination: 24 October 1937
- Consecration: 25 October 1964 by Amleto Giovanni Cicognani

Personal details
- Born: 15 April 1915 Montecontieri (southwest of Asciano), Province of Siena, Kingdom of Italy
- Died: 2 May 1995 (aged 80) Asciano, Tuscany, Italy

Bruno Torpigliani (15 April 1915 – 2 May 1995) was an Italian prelate of the Catholic Church who worked in the diplomatic service of the Holy See. He was made an archbishop in 1964 and served as Apostolic Nuncio to several countries, including the Philippines, for 17 years.

== Biography ==
Bruno Torpigliani was born in the town of Montecontieri outside Asciano, Italy, on 15 April 1915 to Francesco Torpigliani and Laura Landi. He was ordained a priest of the Diocese of Arezzo on 24 October 1937. He was assigned to the parish in his home town and taught at Marconi Technical Institute in Asciano.

To prepare for a diplomatic career, he entered the Pontifical Ecclesiastical Academy in 1944. He also earned a doctorate in theology and canon law.

He joined the diplomatic service of the Holy See in 1946, starting in the offices of the Secretariat of State, then fulfilling assignments in Colombia from 1948 to 1951, Peru for a year, then at the Secretariat from 1952 to 1960, and then in London from 1960 to 1964.

On 1 September 1964, Pope Paul VI appointed him titular archbishop of Malliana and Apostolic Nuncio to El Salvador and to Guatemala. He received his episcopal consecration on 25 October 1964 from Cardinal Amleto Cicognani.

On 3 August 1968, Pope Paul VI named him Apostolic Nuncio to Zaire (now the Democratic Republic of the Congo).

On 6 June 1973, Pope Paul named him Apostolic Nuncio to the Philippines. At times, he sided with the dictatorial regime of President Ferdinand Marcos, Sr, and so was rebuffed by more critical Philippine bishops.

Torpigliani retired seventeen years later in April 1990, when he reached the age of 75. (Note: His successor as Nuncio to the Philippines, Gian Vincenzo Moreni, was appointed on 8 September 1990.) He died in Asciano on 3 May 1995.
