= Gian Vincenzo Moreni =

Italian prelate

- Apostolic Nuncio to Philippines
- Church: Catholic Church
- In office: 8 September 1990 – 3 March 1999
- Predecessor: Bruno Torpigliani
- Successor: Antonio Franco

Orders
- Ordination: 4 April 1959
- Consecration: 5 June 1982 by Agostino Casaroli

Personal details
- Born: 29 January 1932 Montichiari, Province of Brescia, Kingdom of Italy
- Died: 3 March 1999 (aged 67) Montichiari, Lombardy, Italy

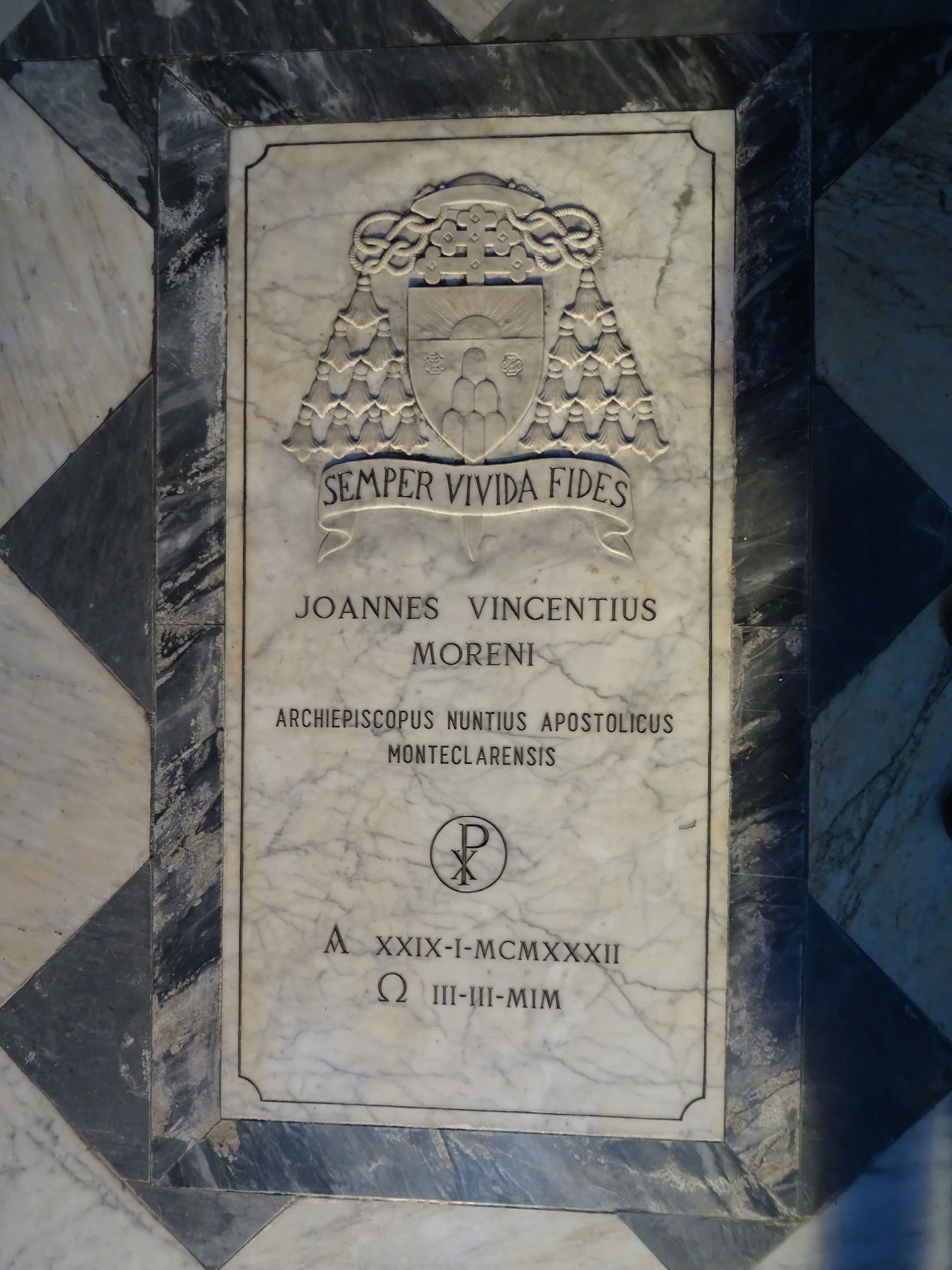
Tomb of Gian Vincenzo Moreni in the parish church of Montichiari

Gian Vincenzo Moreni (29 January 1932 – 3 March 1999) was an Italian prelate of the Catholic Church who worked in the diplomatic service of the Holy See. He was made an archbishop in 1982 and served as Apostolic Nuncio from 1982 to 1999.

== Biography ==
Gian Vincenzo Moreni was born in Montichiari, Italy, on 29 January 1932. He was ordained a priest of the Diocese of Brescia on 4 April 1959. He earned doctorates in theology and canon law, a degree in civil law and licentiates in philosophy and moral theology.

To prepare for a diplomatic career he entered the Pontifical Ecclesiastical Academy in 1961. He entered the diplomatic service in 1963.

On 29 April 1982, Pope John Paul II appointed him titular archbishop of Turris in Mauretania and Apostolic Nuncio to Tanzania. He received his episcopal consecration on 5 June 1982 from Cardinal Agostino Casaroli.

On 8 September 1990, Pope John Paul II named him Apostolic Nuncio to the Philippines.

He died in Montichiari on 3 March 1999 after being treated for cancer for several months.

A street in Montichiari, Via Monsignor Vescovo Gianvincenzo Moreni, is named for him.
