= Artemio Lomboy Rillera =

Artemio Lomboy Rillera S.V.D.
- Bishop of San Fernando de La Union
- Church: Catholic Church
- Diocese: Diocese of San Fernando de La Union
- In office: 1 April 2005 – 13 November 2011
- Predecessor: Antonio Tobias
- Successor: Rodolfo Fontiveros Beltran
- Previous post: Bishop of Bangued (1993-2005)

Orders
- Ordination: 28 November 1970 by Pope Paul VI
- Consecration: 28 August 1993 by Gian Vincenzo Moreni

Personal details
- Born: 1 May 1942 Naguilian, La Union, Philippines
- Died: 13 November 2011 (aged 69)

Artemio Lomboy Rillera, S.V.D. (1 May 1947 – 13 November 2011) was the Roman Catholic bishop of the Roman Catholic Diocese of San Fernando de La Union, Philippines.

Ordained to the priesthood in 1970, Rillera became a bishop in 1993 dying in office.

== Events ==
The significant events in Lomboy Rillera's life are outlined below:

Date	Age	Event	Title
1 May 1942		Born	
28 Jun 1970	28.1	Professed	Member of Society of the Divine Word
28 Nov 1970	28.5	Ordained Priest	Priest of Society of the Divine Word
28 Jun 1993	51.1	Appointed	Bishop of Bangued, Philippines
28 Aug 1993	51.3	Ordained Bishop	Bishop of Bangued, Philippines
1 Apr 2005	62.9	Appointed	Bishop of San Fernando de La Union, Philippines
13 Nov 2011	69.5	Died	Bishop of San Fernando de La Union, Philippines
