= Archdiocese of Cagayan de Oro =

Latin Catholic archdiocese in the Philippines

Coordinates: 8.4749°N 124.6410°E

Archdiocese of Cagayan de Oro Archidioecesis Cagayana Arkidyosesis sa Cagayan de Oro Arquidiócesis de Cagayán de Oro

Catholic
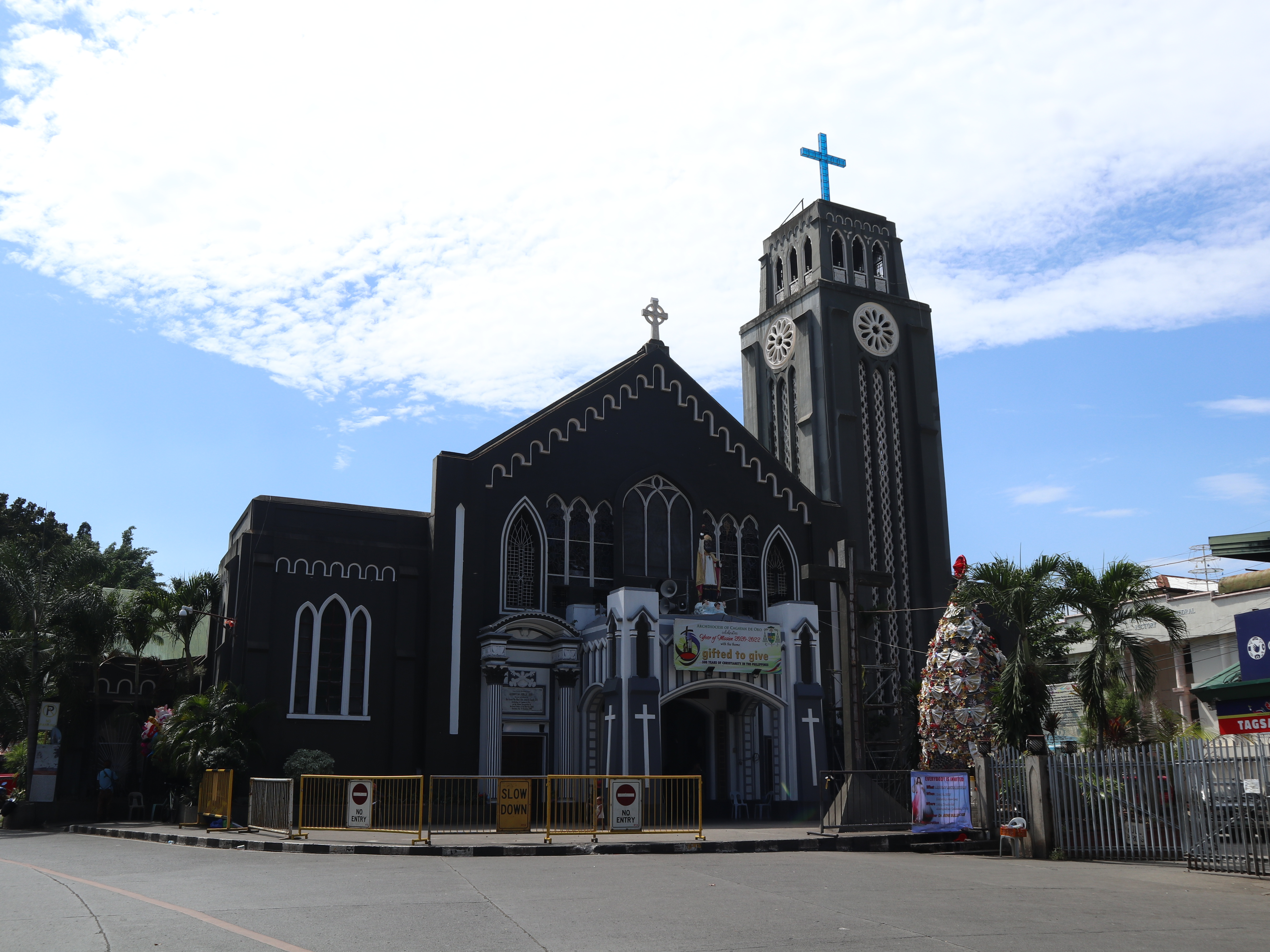
- Saint Augustine Metropolitan Cathedral

- Coat of arms

Location
- Country: Philippines
- Territory: Misamis Oriental; Camiguin; Malitbog, Bukidnon
- Deaneries: 10
- Headquarters: Archbishop's House; Fernandez Street, Barangay 1, Cagayan de Oro 9000

Statistics
- Area: 3,799 km^{2} (1,467 sq mi)
- Population: Total; Catholics: (as of 2023); 1,799,450; 1,443,993 (80.2%)
- Parishes: 71

Information
- Denomination: Catholic Church
- Sui iuris church: Latin Church
- Rite: Roman Rite
- Established: January 20, 1933; 93 years ago (as diocese); June 29, 1951; 75 years ago (as archdiocese)
- Cathedral: Saint Augustine Metropolitan Cathedral
- Patron saint: Augustine of Hippo; Our Lady of the Rosary
- Secular priests: 125
- Language: English, Filipino, and Mindanao Cebuano

Current leadership
- Pope: Leo XIV
- Metropolitan Archbishop: José A. Cabantan
- Suffragans: Cosme Damian R. Almedilla (Butuan); Noel P. Pedregosa (Malaybalay); Ruben C. Labajo (Prosperidad); Antonieto D. Cabajog (Surigao); Raul B. Dael, SSJV (Tandag)
- Vicar General: Msgr. Perseus P. Cabunoc, SSJV; Msgr. Nathaniel Lerio, SSJV; Msgr. Rey Monsanto, SSJV
- Bishops emeritus: Antonio J. Ledesma, SJ

Map
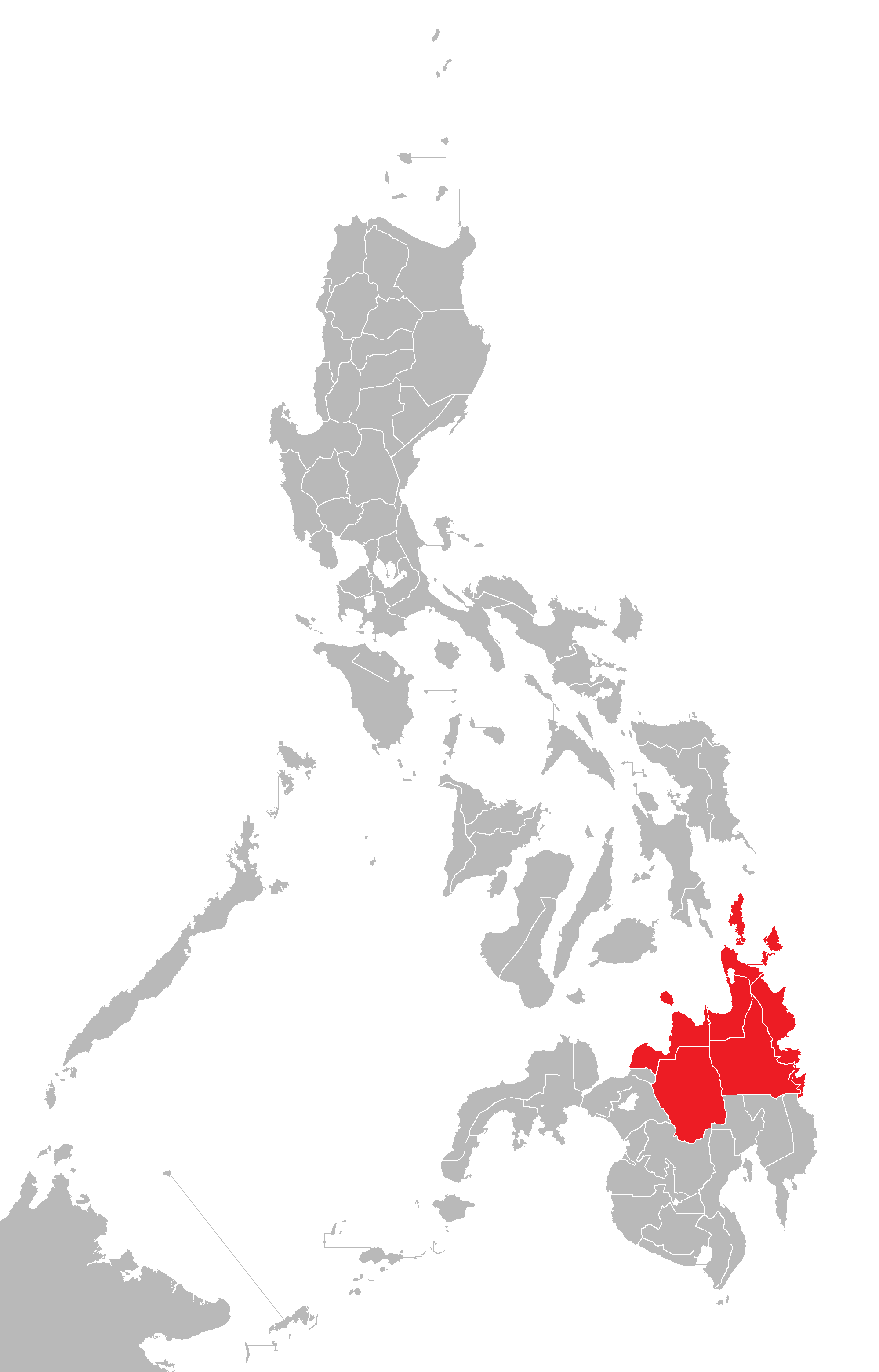
- Jurisdiction of the metropolitan see within the Philippines.

Website
- www.rcacdo.com
- All current statistics are based from updated data taken by Catholic-Hierarchy.org.

The Archdiocese of Cagayan de Oro (Latin: Archidioecesis Cagayana) is a Latin Catholic archdiocese of the Catholic Church in the Philippines.

It is a metropolitan see on the island of Mindanao, which comprises the civil provinces of Misamis Oriental and Camiguin, as well as the municipality of Malitbog, Bukidnon.

Its seat is located at the Saint Augustine Metropolitan Cathedral in Cagayan de Oro, located beside the Cagayan River.

== History ==
=== Early history ===
During the Spanish era, only the Province of Misamis existed, which included the present Provinces of Misamis Oriental and Misamis Occidental, run by the civil government in Cebu. The Recollect missionaries arrived from Cebu and started a new mission in the province.

A civil government of its own only started in 1901, but because one part of it was separated by the Iligan Bay, the government decided to divide the province into two.

Today, the Metropolitan Cathedral of Saint Augustine is one of twelve founded by the Order of Augustinian Recollects in the Philippines.

The whole of Mindanao and Sulu were part of the Diocese of Cebu until 1865, when the western half of the island came under the jurisdiction of the Diocese of Jaro, based in Panay.

Pope Leo XIII then established the Diocese of Zamboanga, separating it from Jaro and making it the first diocese in Mindanao, though Pope Pius X executed this in 1910. From that year on, then-Cagayan de Misamis became a part of the Diocese of Zamboanga.

=== Establishment ===
On January 20, 1933, Pope Pius XI, through the Papal bull Ad maius religionis, divided Mindanao between the Diocese of Zamboanga in the south and a new "Diocese of Cagayan" in the north, to which he appointed an American Jesuit, James T.G. Hayes of New York City, as its first bishop.

More than a year later, on April 28, 1934, Pope Pius XI promulgated an apostolic constitution Romanorum Pontificum semper, separating the dioceses of Cebu, Calbayog, Jaro, Bacolod, Zamboanga, and Cagayan de Misamis from the Ecclesiastical Province of Manila. The same constitution also elevated the diocese of Cebu into an archdiocese while placing all the newly-separated dioceses under a new ecclesiastical province, with Cebu as the new metropolitan see.

Its original territory included the provinces of Surigao, Agusan, Bukidnon, Misamis Oriental, Misamis Occidental, Lanao, and the island of Camiguin. A series of divisions, however, gradually reduced this territory, with the creation of the Diocese of Surigao in 1939 and the Diocese of Ozamis in 1951.

During the episcopacy of Bishop Hayes, he founded two secondary schools, which are later raised into colleges: the Lourdes Academy for Girls in 1928 (run by the Religious of the Virgin Mary and raised into College status as Lourdes College in 1947) and the Ateneo de Cagayan for Boys in 1933 (run by the Jesuits and raised into University status as Xavier University – Ateneo de Cagayan in 1958).

=== Archdiocese ===
On June 29, 1951, during the thirteenth year of Pope Pius XII, the Papal bull "Quo Phillipina Republica" was decreed in order to serve better and more easily the spiritual needs of the Lord's flock in the Philippine Republic. The bull contained the Pope's decision to create new Dioceses and to constitute new Ecclesiastical Provinces in the Philippines.

The Dioceses of Lingayen, Cáceres (Naga City), Nueva Segovia (Ilocos), Tuguegarao, Legazpi, and Sorsogon, as well as the Prelature Nullius of Batanes and Babuyanes were withdrawn from the Metropolitan Archdiocese of Manila, while the Dioceses of Bacolod, Cagayan de Oro, Capiz, Jaro, Surigao, and Zamboanga, as well as the Prelatures Nullius of Cotabato and Sulu, Davao, and Ozamis were withdrawn from the Metropolitan Archdiocese of Cebu.

From these Dioceses, four new Ecclesiastical Provinces were constituted, namely: Nueva Segovia, Cáceres, Jaro, and Cagayan de Oro. The Episcopal seats of these dioceses were elevated to the rank and dignity of Metropolitan Archbishops. Henceforth, Hayes became the very first Metropolitan Archbishop of Cagayan de Oro.

Later on, the Apostolic Prefecture of Sulu, the Prelatures Nullius of Marbel, Tagum, Malaybalay, and Iligan, as well as the Dioceses of Butuan and Tandag became suffragans of the newly-elevated "Archdiocese of Cagayan de Oro".

Eventually, four other archdioceses were established: Zamboanga in 1958, Davao in 1970, Cotabato in 1979, and Ozamis in 1983. At present, there are five ecclesiastical provinces in Mindanao.

=== The Columban mission and Patrick Cronin ===
In 1952, the first Columban missionaries arrived in Cagayan de Oro as a response to the Archbishop's invitation, because he felt the dearth of priests who would care for his flock.

In 1956, in order to respond to the growing number of priests in the diocese, the San Jose de Mindanao Seminary was opened, with Theodore A. Daigler, SJ, as its first rector.

In 1958, the Maria Reyna Hospital was opened in Barangay Camaman-an and directed by the Sisters of Saint Paul of Chartres. Today, it is known as Maria Reyna Xavier University Hospital, and has been co-owned alongside the Archdiocese and Xavier University, which uses the hospital for its practicums, since March 2011.

Archbishop Hayes, after being the shepherd of Cagayan de Oro since his arrival in 1926, retired in 1971.

On January 12, 1971, Patrick H. Cronin, an Irish Columban missionary and the former Bishop-Prelate of Ozamis, was installed as the second Archbishop of Cagayan de Oro.

In 1976, through the initiatives of Archbishop Cronin, the House of Friendship, located amidst the slums of Santo Niño in Barangay Lapasan, was opened in order to cater to the needs of the orphans, neglected children, aged, unwed mothers, physically handicapped, refugees, stranded persons, transient indigents, and victims of calamities. It would later be run by the Canossian Daughters of Charity in 1984 and was renamed Balay Canossa.

At the age of 74, after serving the people of Cagayan de Oro with utmost love and care, Archbishop Cronin decided to retire due to old age and settled at Saint Patrick's House on Seminary Hill in Barangay Camaman-an, which he intentionally built as a retirement home and, at the same time, a home for the aged, sick, and incapacitated diocesan priests of the Archdiocese. To this day, priests get together there on Mondays for games, meetings, and prayers.

=== Recent history ===
Pope John Paul II later accepted Cronin's resignation as Archbishop, which took effect on January 5, 1988. Jesus B. Tuquib, then-Coadjutor Archbishop, succeeded as the third Archbishop of Cagayan de Oro.

On March 4, 2006, Pope Benedict XVI accepted the resignation of Archbishop Tuquib and, at the same time, nominated Antonio J. Ledesma, then the Bishop-Prelate of Ipil, to succeed him and was installed as the fourth Archbishop of Cagayan de Oro on May 30, 2006.

During Archbishop Ledesma's term, he has led the Catholic Bishops' Conference of the Philippines as Chairman of the Episcopal Commission on Inter-religious Dialogue. He has convened local religious leaders in inter-religious dialogues on different social issues.

On June 23, 2020, Pope Francis accepted the resignation of Archbishop Ledesma and appointed Bishop José A. Cabantan of Malaybalay as the fifth Archbishop of Cagayan de Oro. His installation took place on August 28, 2020, during the Feast Day of Saint Augustine.

== Coat of arms ==
The flaming heart represents Saint Augustine, bishop of Hippo and Doctor of the Church, the patron saint of the cathedral. The gold wavy band symbolizes the Cagayan de Oro River after which the city gets its name. The smoking mountain is Hibok-Hibok, a well-known active and destructive volcano on Camiguin Island, which is within the territory of the archdiocese.

=== Timeline of the Archdiocese's coats of arms ===
1951-1988

1988–2020

2020-present
(2025 Version)

== Community ==
=== Priests ===
As of 2023, there are a total of 180 priests (125 diocesan and 55 religious) serving within the jurisdiction of the archdiocese.

Most of them are in the 71 parishes, but there are also others without a parish, either in the seminary or carrying out diocesan or apostolate tasks. Some are outside the archdiocese, either on study-leave, on mission, working in other dioceses, or on-leave from the ministry, and some are retired.

Most of the diocesan priests are members of a society founded by the Venerable Teofilo Camomot: the Society of Saint John Vianney.

There are ten (10) male religious congregations in the archdiocese:

- Congregation of the Blessed Sacrament
- Congregation of the Sacred Stigmata of Our Lord Jesus Christ
- Franciscan Friars of the Immaculate
- Missionary Society of Saint Columban
- Mission Society of the Philippines
- Poor Servants of Divine Providence
- Priests of the Sacred Heart of Jesus
- Society of Jesus
- Society of Saint Paul
- Congregation of Marian Fathers of the Immaculate Conception

=== Nuns ===
Of the 18 religious institutes for women in the archdiocese, one of them is an institute of contemplative life.

- Angelic Sisters of Saint Paul
- Augustinian Sisters of Our Lady of Consolation
- Canossian Daughters of Charity
- Carmelite Missionaries
- Order of the Company of Mary Our Lady
- Daughters of Saint Paul
- Franciscan Missionaries of Mary
- Daughters of Jesus
- Missionary Congregation of Mary
- Discalced Carmelites
- Our Lady's Missionaries
- Religious of the Assumption
- Religious of the Good Shepherd
- Religious Sisters of Mercy
- Religious of the Virgin Mary
- Siervas de Nuestra Señora de la Paz
- Sisters of Saint Paul of Chartres
- Ursuline Missionaries of the Sacred Heart

==== Pious associations ====
These are the groups of women on the way of becoming religious institutes of diocesan right:

- Missionary Sisters of the Holy Family
- Theresian Missionaries of Mary
- Sisters of Social Apostolate

The Missionary Sisters of the Holy Family and the Theresian Missonaries of Mary are outgrowths of the original group founded by Camomot and brought by him to Cagayan de Oro: the Daughters of Saint Teresa, which later moved to Cebu. There is also another aassociation, the Teresiana.

The religious sisters engage in various fields of apostolate, such as: running or administering schools, campus ministries, parish work, catechism, family life, hospital work, running orphanages, taking care of young ladies, and others.

== Educational institutions ==
=== Seminaries ===
There are two seminaries in the archdiocese: a college seminary and a theological seminary.

==== San Jose de Mindanao Seminary ====
Founded by Archbishop Hayes in 1955, the college seminary, named the San Jose de Mindanao Seminary, is mainly for the seminarians of the archdiocese, although it continues to receive seminarians from other ecclesiastical jurisdictions. It has a pre-college year and four main years of college. The seminarians used to study within the halls of the seminary. However, due to lack of personnel and other reasons, they now take their courses at Xavier University – Ateneo de Cagayan. It was first administered by the Jesuits, then by the Columban priests, and now by the diocesan clergy.

==== Saint John Vianney Theological Seminary ====
The Saint John Vianney Theological Seminary, opened in 1985, caters mainly to the seminarians of the Ecclesiastical Province of Cagayan de Oro, although it also accepts seminarians from other aforementioned jurisdictions. It has a Spiritual Pastoral Formation Year and four years of Theology. In consortium with Xavier University – Ateneo de Cagayan, it also offers a master's degree in Pastoral Theology. It is run mainly by the Jesuit Fathers, though there are also many diocesan priests teaching in the seminary. Construction was started by Archbishop Cronin and finished by Archbishop Tuquib.

While older priests are products of other institutions, such as the University of Santo Tomas Central Seminary in Manila, the San Jose Major Seminary at the Ateneo de Manila University in Quezon City, the San Carlos Seminary in Makati, and the Saint Francis Xavier Regional Major Seminary (REMASE) of Mindanao in Davao City, most of the younger clergy were educated at the Saint John Vianney Theological Seminary.

=== Universities, colleges, and schools ===
Within the Archdiocese, there are two Catholic universities (Xavier University – Ateneo de Cagayan, run by the Jesuits; and Father Saturnino Urios University, run by the Diocese of Butuan) and four colleges (Lourdes, Saint Rita's, and Christ the King, run by the Religious of the Virgin Mary; and Fatima College in Camiguin, run by the Religious Sisters of Mercy). Most of them were either founded by Archbishop Hayes himself or founded during his time.

There are also 18 Catholic schools, most of which are run by sisters. A group of sisters, the Daughters of Jesus, administers the only Chinese Catholic school in Cagayan de Oro, the Kong Hua School (in collaboration with the Lorenzo Ruiz Mission Society). The Religious of the Virgin Mary run St. Mary's Academy of Carmen.

== Suffragan dioceses ==
Diocese		Bishop	Territory	Seat	Coat of Arms
1.	Butuan	Cosme Damian R. Almedilla (since June 25, 2019)	Agusan del Norte	Cathedral of Saint Joseph the Worker	
2.	Malaybalay	Noel P. Pedregosa (since September 14, 2021)	All of Bukidnon (except Malitbog); Wao, Lanao del Sur; Barangay Buda, Davao City	Cathedral of Saint Isidore the Farmer	
3.	Prosperidad	Ruben C. Labajo (since January 28, 2025)	Agusan del Sur	Cathedral of Saint Michael the Archangel in Prosperidad	
4.	Surigao	Antonieto D. Cabajog (since July 24, 2001)	Surigao del Norte; Dinagat Islands	Cathedral of Saint Nicholas of Tolentino in Surigao City	
5.	Tandag	Raul B. Dael, SSJV (since June 14, 2018)	Surigao del Sur	Cathedral of Saint Nicholas of Tolentino in Tandag	

== Ordinaries ==
=== Metropolitan Archbishops ===
Archbishop		Period in Office	Coat of Arms
1.	James T. G. Hayes, SJ† (1889–1980)	20 January 1933 – 29 June 1951 (as Bishop of Cagayan de Oro) (18 years, 160 days); 29 June 1951 – 13 October 1970 (as Archbishop of Cagayan de Oro) (19 years, 106 days)	
2.	Patrick H. Cronin, SSCME† (1913–1991)	13 October 1970 – 5 January 1988 (17 years, 84 days)	
3.	Jesus B. Tuquib† (1930–2019)	5 January 1988 – 4 March 2006 (18 years, 58 days)	
4.	Antonio J. Ledesma, SJ (b. 1943)	4 March 2006 – 23 June 2020 (14 years, 111 days)	
5.	José A. Cabantan (b. 1957)	28 August 2020 – present (6 years, 19 days)	

=== Coadjutor Archbishops ===
Bishop		Period in Office	Titular See	Coat of Arms	Notes
1.	Teofilo B. Camomot, OCDS† (1914–1988)	10 June 1958 – 17 June 1970 (12 years, 7 days)	Marcianopolis		Did not succeed to see Declared Venerable on May 21, 2022
2.	Jesus B. Tuquib† (1930–2019)	10 June 1958 – 17 June 1970 (3 years, 280 days)			Succeeded as Archbishop

=== Auxiliary Bishops ===
Bishop		Period in Office	Titular See	Coat of Arms	Notes
1.	Ireneo A. Amantillo, CSsR† (1934–2018)	2 January 1976 – 6 September 1978 (2 years, 247 days)	Girus		Appointed Bishop of Tandag
2.	Jesus A. Dosado, CM† (1939–2020)	4 June 1979 – 29 July 1981 (2 years, 55 days)	Nabala		Appointed Bishop (later Archbishop) of Ozamis
3.	Christian Vicente F. Noel† (1937–2017)	1 October 1981 – 6 September 1986 (4 years, 340 days)	Thuccabora		Appointed Bishop of Talibon

=== Affiliated Bishops ===
- Alberto S. Uy – Archbishop of Cebu (From Saint John Vianney Theological Seminary)
- Raul B. Dael, SSJV – Bishop of Tandag (From Saint John Vianney Theological Seminary/Former Vicar General for Clergy of the Archdiocese of Cagayan de Oro)
- Severo C. Caermare – Bishop of Dipolog (From Saint John Vianney Theological Seminary)
- Jose R. Rapadas III – Bishop of Iligan (From Saint John Vianney Theological Seminary)
- Cerilo Allan U. Casicas – Bishop of Marbel (Former Director and Professor at Saint John Vianney Theological Seminary)
- Noel P. Pedregosa – Bishop of Malaybalay (From Saint John Vianney Theological Seminary)
- Reynaldo Bersabal – Auxiliary Bishop of Sacramento (From Saint John Vianney Theological Seminary)
- Jose R. Manguiran – Bishop of Dipolog (Priest from Cagayan de Oro)

== See also ==
- Cagayan de Oro
- Catholic Church in the Philippines
  - List of Catholic dioceses in the Philippines
