= Cosme Almedilla =

Filipino bishop

His Excellency, The Most Reverend Cosme Damian Racines Almedilla D.D.
- Bishop of Butuan
- Province: Cagayan de Oro
- See: Butuan
- Appointed: March 25, 2019
- Installed: June 25, 2019
- Predecessor: Juan de Dios Pueblos
- Successor: Incumbent

Orders
- Ordination: August 4, 1987 by Christian Vicente Noel
- Consecration: June 25, 2019 by Antonio Ledesma

Personal details
- Born: Cosme Damian Racines Almedilla; September 27, 1959 (age 67) San Miguel, Bohol, Philippines
- Denomination: Roman Catholic
- Education: Ateneo de Manila University; St. John XXII College Seminary
- Motto: Pasce oves meas (Latin for 'Feed my sheep' – John 21:15)
- Coat of arms: Cosme Damian Racines Almedilla's coat of arms

Ordination history
History
Priestly ordination
- Ordained by: Christian Vicente Noel
Episcopal consecration
- Principal consecrator: Antonio Ledesma
- Co-consecrators: Jose Cabantan; Daniel Parcon
- Styles
- Reference style: His Excellency; The Most Reverend
- Spoken style: Your Excellency
- Religious style: Bishop

Cosme Damian R. Almedilla (born September 27, 1959) is a Filipino Roman Catholic prelate who is currently serving as the Bishop of the Diocese of Butuan. He was appointed to the episcopacy by Pope Francis on March 25, 2019, succeeding the late Bishop Juan de Dios Pueblos, as the third bishop of Butuan.

== Early life and education ==
Almedilla was born on September 27, 1959, in San Miguel, Bohol. He pursued his seminary formation at the St. John XXIII College Seminary in Malaybalay, Bukidnon, and subsequently his theological formation at the Loyola School of Theology, in Ateneo de Manila University.

== Ministry ==
=== Priesthood ===
Almedilla was ordained to the priesthood on August 4, 1987, by then-Talibon Bishop Christian Vicente Noel. Almedilla was then incardinated into the Diocese of Talibon after his ordination, serving as a priest in Ubay, before eventually holding seminary formator posts, and then becoming a parish priest at Baungon, Bukidnon, from 2000 to 2001.

Almedilla also served as a chaplain at the Asian Hospital and Medical Center in Muntinlupa City, where he provided pastoral care, counseling, and ministry to patients, families, and healthcare workers.

From 2015 to his elevation to the episcopacy in 2019, Almedilla served as the pastoral director of the Diocese of Talibon, and since 2017, served as the parish priest at the Holy Child Parish in Ubay, Bohol.

=== Episcopate ===
Almedilla was appointed by Pope Francis as bishop of the Diocese of Butuan on March 25, 2019, succeeding Bishop Juan de Dios Pueblos, who died in 2017. He was consecrated a bishop and took his canonical possession of the diocese on June 25, 2019, at Saint Joseph Cathedral in Butuan City.

He was principally consecrated by then-Cagayan de Oro ordinary and Diocese of Butuan Apostolic Administrator Archbishop Antonio Ledesma, with Bishops Jose Cabantan and Daniel Parcon acting as co-consecrators.

Almedilla, tracing his pastoral ministry rooted in community formation and involvement, has been a vocal advocate of the role of the family in living Catholic values, and on the protection of the environment.

In 2023, he formally sent a petition to the Holy See, requesting to partition the Diocese of Butuan, which then whose Ecclesiastical territory included Prosperidad. The request emphasizes the pastoral needs for Agusan del Sur, whom he considers as a "missionary frontier." Additionally, he argued that the area needed "dedicated episcopal attention." In October 2024, the Holy See formally approved the split, which gave way to the creation of the Diocese of Prosperidad, a new territory carved out of the Diocese of Butuan.

== See also ==
- Roman Catholic Diocese of Butuan

Catholic Church titles
Preceded by Juan de Dios Pueblos	Bishop of Butuan; June 25, 2019 – present	Incumbent
