= Rey Bersabal =

Filipino American Catholic prelate (born 1964)

His Excellency, The Most Reverend Rey Bersabal
- Auxiliary Bishop of Sacramento
- Diocese: Sacramento
- Appointed: April 20, 2024
- Other post: Titular Bishop of Balecio

Orders
- Ordination: April 29, 1991 by Jesus Balaso Tuquib
- Consecration: May 31, 2024 by Jaime Soto, William Weigand, and Jose Cabantan

Personal details
- Born: October 15, 1964 (age 62) Magsaysay, Misamis Oriental, Philippines
- Education: Seminary of San Jose de Mindanao; Xavier University – Ateneo de Cagayan
- Motto: In autem verbo Tuo (Latin for 'But at Your word')

Ordination history
History
Episcopal consecration
- Principal consecrator: Jaime Soto
- Co-consecrators: William Weigand; Jose Cabantan
- Styles
- Reference style: His Excellency; The Most Reverend
- Spoken style: Your Excellency
- Religious style: Bishop

Reynaldo Bendijo Bersabal (born October 15, 1964) is a Filipino American Catholic prelate serving as an auxiliary bishop of the Diocese of Sacramento in California since 2024.

== Biography ==
=== Early life ===
Reynaldo Bendijo Bersabal was born on October 15, 1964, in Magsaysay, Misamis Oriental in the Philippines. He is the youngest of three children born to Juanita Guzman Bendijo and Ananias Amparo Bersabal. Deciding to become a priest, he entered the diocesan seminary of San Jose de Mindanao. He later received a Bachelor of Arts degree in philosophy from Xavier University – Ateneo de Cagayan in Cagayan de Oro, Misamis Oriental.

=== Priesthood ===
On April 29, 1991, Bersabal was ordained to the priesthood for the Archdiocese of Cagayan de Oro in the Philippines by Jesus Tuquib. After his ordination, the archdiocese assigned Bersabal as parish vicar of Our Lady of Snows Parish. He was transferred in 1992 to serve as administrator of Our Lady of Guadalupe Parish. The archdiocese named him as pastor in 1995 of Our Lady of Guadalupe Parish. Bersabal was named chancellor of the archdiocese in 1998 and archdiocesan director of the Pontifical Mission Societies in the Philippines.

Bersabal moved to Sacramento, California in 1999, at the invitation of Bishop William Weigand, and was assigned as parish vicar of St. James Parish in Davis. The diocese transferred him in 2002 to St. Anthony Parish in Sacramento. Bersabal was named pastor of Saint Paul Parish in Sacramento in 2004. That same year, he was incardinated as a priest from the Archdiocese of Cagayan de Oro to the Diocese of Sacramento.

The diocese sent Bersabal to St. John the Baptist Parish in Folsom in 2008. During this time, he was also made diocesan liaison for the Filipino presbyterate in 2012. He returned to St. James, this time as pastor in 2016. In 2022, Bersabal was made pastor of Saint Francis of Assisi Parish in Sacramento.

=== Auxiliary Bishop of Sacramento ===
Pope Francis appointed Bersabal as titular bishop of Balecio and as an auxiliary bishop of Sacramento on April 20, 2024. On May 31, 2024, Bersabal was consecrated as a bishop at the Cathedral of the Blessed Sacrament in Sacramento by Bishop Jaime Soto, with Bishop emertius Weigand and Archbishop Jose Cabantan of Cagayan de Oro serving as co-consecrators. As auxiliary bishop, he also serves as vicar general for the diocese. Bersabal speaks English, Tagalog, Visayan, and Spanish.

== Episcopal succession ==
Catholic Church titles
Preceded by -	Auxiliary Bishop of Sacramento; 2024-Present	Succeeded by -
