= Diocese of Tandag =

Latin Catholic diocese in the Philippines

Diocese of Tandag Dioecesis Tandagensis Diyosesis sa Tandag Diyosesis ng Tandag

Catholic
- Coat of arms

Location
- Country: Philippines
- Territory: Surigao del Sur
- Ecclesiastical province: Cagayan de Oro
- Metropolitan: Cagayan de Oro
- Deaneries: 4
- Coordinates: 9°02′40″N 126°12′45″E

Statistics
- Area: 4,862 km^{2} (1,877 sq mi)
- Population: Total; Catholics: (as of 2021); 752,496; 592,968 (78.8%)

Information
- Denomination: Catholic
- Sui iuris church: Latin Church
- Rite: Roman Rite
- Established: 16 June 1978
- Cathedral: New Cathedral of Saint Nicholas of Tolentino in Tandag
- Co-cathedral: Old Cathedral of Saint Nicholas of Tolentino in Tandag
- Patron saint: Saint Nicholas of Tolentino

Current leadership
- Pope: Leo XIV
- Bishop: Raul B. Dael, SSJV
- Metropolitan Archbishop: José A. Cabantan
- Vicar General: Isidro H. Irizari, PC, VG
- Episcopal Vicars: Arturo P. Langit; Jaime B. Panares

The Diocese of Tandag (Lat: Dioecesis Tandagensis) is a diocese of the Latin Church of the Catholic Church in the Philippines.

Pope John Paul II via his decree Quo Plenius Atque erected the diocese on 9 December 1978 from the Diocese of Surigao.

The diocese has experienced no jurisdictional changes, and is a suffragan of the Archdiocese of Cagayan de Oro.

On 26 February 2018, Pope Francis named Raul B. Dael, Vicar for the Clergy of the Archdiocese of Cagayan de Oro as the bishop of Tandag, replacing Nereo P. Odchimar, who had reached the mandatory age of retirement, which was accepted by Pope Francis.

== Coat of arms ==
On top, on a blue / azure field symbolizing fidelity and truth, the crucifix with intertwined lily, a loaf of bread on a plate, and the star—all depicted proper—attributes of St. Nicholas of Tolentino, principal patron of the Diocese. To the left of the attributes, the blessing hand with brown glove, depicted proper, an allusion to Padre San Pio of Pietrelcina, secondary patron of the Diocese. On base, on a green / vert field symbolizing hope and lush vegetation, the heraldic symbol for mountains in gold / or, symbolizing the rich resources of the Province of Surigao del Sur. The symbol alludes to the Diwata mountain range located in the Province. Beneath is the heraldic symbol for water in blue / azure, symbolizing the Philippine Sea, the body of water bordering the coastline of the Province.

== Ordinaries ==
No	Name	In office	Coat of arms
1.	Ireneo A. Amantillo, CssR	6 Sep 1978 appointed – 18 Oct 2001 resigned	
2.	Nereo P. Odchimar	18 Oct 2001 appointed – 26 Feb 2018 retired	
3.	Raul B. Dael, SSJV	26 Feb 2018 appointed	

== See also ==
- Catholic Church in the Philippines
