= Diocese of Butuan =

Latin Catholic diocese in the Philippines

Coordinates: 8.9477°N 125.5430°E

Diocese of Butuan Dioecesis Butuanensis Diyosesis hong Butuan Diyosesis sa Butuan Diyosesis ng Butuan

Catholic
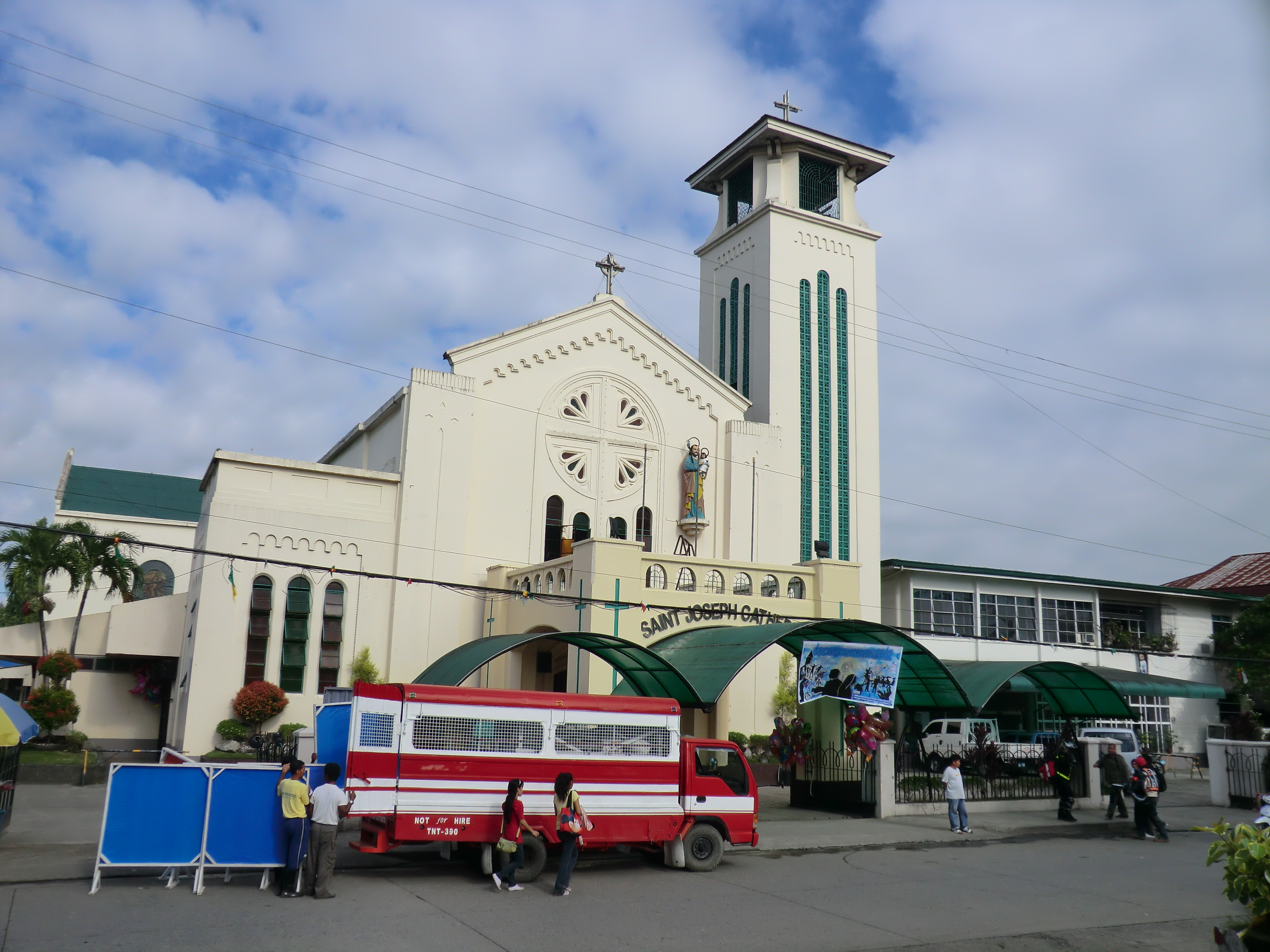
- Butuan Cathedral

- Coat of arms

Location
- Country: Philippines
- Territory: Butuan, Agusan del Norte
- Ecclesiastical province: Cagayan de Oro
- Metropolitan: Cagayan de Oro

Statistics
- Area: 3,546.86 km^{2} (1,369.45 sq mi)
- Population: Total; Catholics: (as of 2021); 691,566; 947,044 (79.4%)
- Parishes: 31

Information
- Denomination: Catholic Church
- Sui iuris church: Latin Church
- Rite: Roman Rite
- Established: 20 March 1967
- Cathedral: Cathedral of Saint Joseph
- Patron saint: Joseph
- Secular priests: 87

Current leadership
- Pope: Leo XIV
- Bishop: Cosme Almedilla
- Metropolitan Archbishop: José A. Cabantan
- Vicar General: Rev. Msgr. Guy Arnold L. Pineda, VG

The Diocese of Butuan (Lat: Dioecesis Butuanensis) is a diocese of the Latin Church of the Catholic Church in the Philippines.

== History ==
The diocese was erected in 1967, through Pope Paul VI, separating from the Diocese of Surigao. The territory of the Diocese of Butuan contained the Province of Agusan del Sur (now the Diocese of Prosperidad) and Agusan del Norte, and Carmelo Dominador Morelos was its first bishop. The diocese is a suffragan of the Archdiocese of Cagayan de Oro.

On October 15, 2024, the new Diocese of Prosperidad was carved out of the Diocese of Butuan. The new diocese comprises the province of Agusan del Sur. Pope Francis appointed Ruben C. Labajo, auxiliary bishop of Cebu, as the first ordinary of the new diocese.

== Coat of arms ==
Vert, on a bend sinister wavy Azure a lily Argent slipped proper, between two pomegranates Or seeded Gules.

The pomegranates allude to Butuan, a Malayan word meaning "full of seeds". It is also a symbol of the Resurrection of Our Lord. The blue wavy bend sinister represents the Agusan River. The green field symbolizes fertility, a promise, and a hope for material and spiritual progress and prosperity in the Diocese. The lily is the symbol of St. Joseph, the Patron Saint of Butuan and titular of the Diocese of Butuan.

== Ordinaries ==
Bishop		Period in office	Coat of arms
1.	Carmelo D.F. Morelos, DD, JCD, STL, PhL	4 April 1967 – 8 December 1994	
2.	Juan de Dios M. Pueblos, DD.	27 November 1995 – 21 October 2017	
3.	Cosme Damian R. Almedilla, DD.	25 June 2019 – present	

== See also ==
- Catholic Church in the Philippines
- Butuan
