= Nereo Odchimar =

Filipino Roman Catholic bishop (1940–2024)

His Excellency Nereo Odchimar
- Bishop Emeritus of Tandag
- Metropolis: Cagayan de Oro
- Appointed: 18 October 2001
- Term ended: 26 February 2018
- Predecessor: Ireneo Alisla Amantillo
- Successor: Raul Dael
- Other post: President of the Catholic Bishops' Conference of the Philippines (2009–2011)

Orders
- Ordination: 19 December 1964
- Consecration: 27 November 2001 by Jaime Sin

Personal details
- Born: October 16, 1940 Surigao del Norte, Commonwealth of the Philippines
- Died: February 1, 2024 (aged 83) Davao City, Philippines
- Motto: DUC IN ALTUM
- Coat of arms

Styles of Nereo Odchimar
- Reference style: His Excellency; The Most Reverend
- Spoken style: Your Excellency
- Religious style: Bishop

Nereo Page Odchimar (October 16, 1940 – February 1, 2024) was a Filipino prelate of the Roman Catholic Church.

== Biography ==
Born in Bacuag, Surigao del Norte, Odchimar was ordained to the priesthood in 1964. He was appointed bishop of Tandag in 2001, serving until his retirement in 2018.

On February 1, 2024, Odchimar died of metabolic encephalopathy due to end-stage renal disease and diabetic nephropathy at San Pedro Hospital in Davao City. He was 83.

Catholic Church titles
Preceded by Ireneo A. Amantillo	Bishop of Tandag; 2001–2018	Succeeded by Raul Dael
