= Honesto Pacana =

Filipino Roman Catholic bishop (1933–2024)

His Excellency Honesto Pacana S.J.
- Bishop of Malaybalay
- Metropolis: Cagayan de Oro
- Appointed: 12 January 1994
- Term ended: 15 May 2010
- Predecessor: Gaudencio Rosales
- Successor: Jose Cabantan

Orders
- Ordination: 10 June 1965 by Francis Spellman
- Consecration: 24 March 1994 by Gian Vincenzo Moreni

Personal details
- Born: Honesto Chaves Pacana; January 22, 1933 Cagayan de Misamis, Philippine Islands
- Died: February 1, 2024 (aged 91) Cagayan de Oro, Philippines
- Motto: Dominus Fortitudo Mea ("The Lord is my Strength")

Styles of Honesto Chaves Pacana
- Reference style: His Excellency; The Most Reverend
- Spoken style: Your Excellency
- Religious style: Bishop

Honesto Chaves Pacana (January 22, 1933 – February 1, 2024) was a Filipino prelate of the Roman Catholic Church.

== Biography ==
Born in Cagayan de Oro, Pacana was ordained to the priesthood in 1965. He was appointed bishop of Malaybalay in 1994, serving until his retirement in 2010.

On February 1, 2024, Pacana died at Cagayan de Oro's Maria Reyna Xavier University Hospital, at the age of 91.

Catholic Church titles
| Preceded by Gaudencio B. Rosales | Bishop of Malaybalay; 1994–2010 | Succeeded by Jose A. Cabantan |
