= Teofilo Camomot =

Filipino archbishop and Venerable

Venerable Teofilo Bastida Camomot OCDS
- Coadjutor Archbishop of Cagayan de Oro
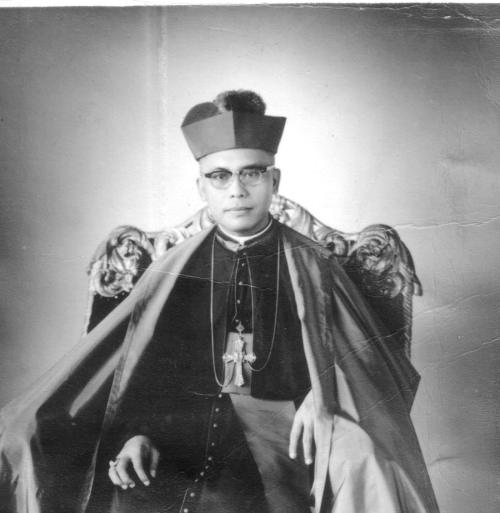
- Archbishop Teofilo Camomot, D.D.
- Native name: Teofilo Camomot
- Church: Roman Catholic Church
- Archdiocese: Cagayan de Oro
- See: Cagayan de Oro
- Appointed: 20 June 1970
- Term ended: 27 September 1988
- Other posts: Auxiliary Bishop of Jaro (1955–1958); Titular Archbishop of Marcianopolis (1958–1988); Coadjutor Archbishop of Cagayan de Oro (1958–1970)

Orders
- Ordination: 14 December 1941 by Gabriel Reyes
- Consecration: 29 May 1955 as Bishop of Jaro by Julio Rosales
- Rank: Archbishop

Personal details
- Born: Teofilo Bastida Camomot; 3 March 1914 Carcar, Cebu, Insular Government of the Philippine Islands
- Died: 27 September 1988 (aged 74) San Fernando, Cebu, Philippines
- Buried: Valladolid, Carcar, Cebu
- Denomination: Roman Catholic
- Residence: Cebu City, Philippines
- Education: Carcar Elementary School
- Motto: Zelo zelatus sum ("With zeal have I been zealous...")
- Coat of arms: Teofilo Bastida Camomot's coat of arms

Teofilo Bastida Camomot (3 March 1914 – 27 September 1988) was a Roman Catholic archbishop from the Philippines. Ordained a diocesan priest of the Archdiocese of Cebu on 14 December 1941, he was eventually appointed an auxiliary bishop on 23 March 1955 and receiving the titular see of Clysma. He became coadjutor archbishop of the Archdiocese of Cagayan de Oro on 10 June 1958, becoming titular archbishop of Marcianopolis. While waiting for then-archbishop James Hayes to retire, Camomot resigned for health reasons on 17 June 1970. He was killed in a vehicular accident in San Fernando on 27 September 1988 at the age of 74. A process was started which may lead to his canonization as a saint.

== Biography ==
Styles of Teofilo Camomot
- Reference style: The Most Reverend
- Spoken style: Your Excellency
- Religious style: Archbishop
- Posthumous style: Venerable

Ordination history of Teofilo Camomot
History
Priestly ordination
- Ordained by: Gabriel Reyes
Episcopal consecration
- Consecrated by: Julio Rosales

Camomot was born on 3 March 1914, in Barangay Cogon, Carcar, Cebu, to Luis Camomot and Angela Bastida. He was christened the following day, and on 22 August 1915, he received the Sacrament of Confirmation. From an early age, Camomot was already immersed in a very religious environment. He spent his elementary years at Carcar Elementary School where he was nicknamed "Lolong". After graduating from elementary, Camomot decided to help his father on the farm and dreamt of being an agriculturist, which his mother disapproved of. When his elder brother Diosdado visited and saw Camomot was not attending school, he asked him if he wanted to enter the seminary.

Camomot entered the Seminario Menor de San Carlos in Mabolo, Cebu City, for his secondary education from 1932 to 1933, pursuing his philosophical and theological studies at the Seminario Mayor de San Carlos. He was ordained a priest on 14 December 1941, celebrating his Cantamisa (first Mass of a newly ordained priest) at the second floor of his family house instead of the parish church in Carcar because of the outbreak of the Second World War.

== Later life ==
For twelve years, he served as curé of Santa Teresa de Ávila Parish in Talisay. In 1955, the Third Order of Carmelites Discalced (now the Secular Order of Carmelites Discalced) was established at the Carmelite Monastery in Barangay Mabolo, Cebu City, and Camomot was elected as the first prior of the San Elías Chapter.

On 25 March 1955, Camomot was appointed auxiliary bishop of Jaro, Iloilo, receiving episcopal ordination on 29 May 1955 and staying until 1959. After Mass, he would visit the poor and sick. In 1959, he was sent to the Archdiocese of Cagayán de Oro as coadjutor archbishop with right of succession. He formed the Paulinian Faith Defenders and the Carmelite Tertiaries of the Blessed Eucharist, the predecessor organisation of the Daughters of Saint Teresa.

Between 1962 and 1965, he attended the first (11 October 1962 – 8 December 1962), third (14 September 1964 – 21 November 1964), and fourth (14 September 1965 – 8 December 1965) sessions of the Second Vatican Council.

Due to kidney problems, he had to resign as coadjutor archbishop in 1970. He returned to Cebu and was assigned to Santo Tomás de Villanueva Parish in Barangay El Pardo, Cebu City. Together with him were some sisters from the congregation he had founded in Mindanao. While in Pardo, he also frequently visited his former parish in Talisay. In 1976, he was assigned curé to his native Carcar, and was auxiliary bishop to Cardinal Julio Rosales.

== Death ==
On 27 September 1988, after celebrating Mass for the feast of Saint Vincent de Paul at the Seminario Mayor de San Carlos and visiting the Carmelite Monastery in Barangay Mabolo, Camomot was driven home to Carcar by his chauffeur. The vehicle overturned in Sitio Magtalisay, Barangay Sangat, San Fernando, Cebu, killing Camomot but not his chauffeur.

Thousands attended Camomot's funeral at the municipal cemetery. In 2009, his body was exhumed for transfer to the Daughters of Santa Teresa convent in Valladolid, Carcar.

His tomb has since become a site of pilgrimage, especially on his birth anniversary every 3 March, and his death anniversary on 27 September. Near the tomb, a museum displays various items he had used in his lifetime including his bed.

== Cause for beatification and canonization ==
Camomot was neither an eloquent preacher nor a convincing speaker, but was noted for spending hours in the confessional, waking very early for Lauds and meditation, and doing the works of mercy. He is said to have pawned his pectoral cross to help give to the poor.

Archbishop of Cebu emeritus Ricardo Jamin Vidal said there were several reports of Camomot's bilocation as people would see him in two places at the same time. Vidal signed an affidavit in relation to an eyewitness account on this phenomenon, where Camomot was drowsing beside him at a meeting of the College of Consultors. “I have already authenticated his presence at a meeting. But a woman said at that time he was in a mountain barangay (in Carcar) giving the last sacrament to a dying person,” he said. “He (Camomot) was at my left, and Archbishop (Manuel) Salvador—discussing about the pastoral (thrust) of the diocese—at my right. I said ‘Monsignor, we are voting, and you have to vote’,” he added.

The Daughters of Saint Teresa formally petitioned for the opening of a cause for beatification and canonization. On 15 October 2010, Cardinal Vidal announced that the Holy See had opening Camomot's cause.

On May 21, 2022, after completion of the appropriate procedures, Pope Francis elevated Camomot to the status of Venerable. After further processes and verified miracles, he may be beatified and eventually canonized as a Saint.

During an audience with Cardinal Marcello Semeraro, Pope Francis promulgated several decrees, including one outlining the heroic virtue of Camomot.

== See also ==
- List of Filipinos venerated in the Catholic Church
