= Juan de Dios Pueblos =

Roman Catholic bishop

- Bishop of Butuan
- Province: Butuan
- Installed: 27 November 1995
- Term ended: 21 October 2017
- Predecessor: Carmelo D.F. Morelos
- Successor: Cosme Damian Almedilla
- Previous posts: Auxiliary Archbishop of Davao and; Titular Bishop of Zaba; (1985–1987); Bishop of Kidapawan; (1987–1995)

Orders
- Ordination: 30 March 1968
- Consecration: 24 June 1985

Personal details
- Born: Juan de Dios Mataflorida Pueblos; 8 March 1943 Loon, Bohol, Philippine Commonwealth
- Died: 21 October 2017 (aged 74) San Juan, Metro Manila, Philippines
- Denomination: Roman Catholic
- Motto: SIC LUCEAT LUX VESTRA IN NOS

Juan de Dios Mataflorida Pueblos (8 March 1943 – 21 October 2017) was a Roman Catholic bishop.

Pueblos was born on 8 March 1943 in Moto Sur in the municipality of Loon, Bohol, Philippines. He studied at the Immaculate Heart Seminary in Tagbilaran and San Carlos Major Seminary.

Pueblos was ordained to the priesthood on 30 March 1968 and was consecrated as bishop on 24 June 1985. He was appointed auxiliary bishop of the Archdiocese of Davao by Pope John Paul II on 29 April 1985. He served in the post until 3 February 1987 while also being the Titular bishop of Zaba in Algeria. He served as bishop of the Diocese of Kidapawan from 3 February 1987 to 27 November 1995. Pueblos served as bishop of the Diocese of Butuan from 27 November 1995 until his death. He was hospitalised with leukemia at the Cardinal Santos Medical Center in San Juan, Metro Manila in 2017, and died two months later, on 21 October 2017.

== See also ==
- Catholic Church in the Philippines
