= Talibon Cathedral =

Roman Catholic church in Bohol, Philippines

- Most Holy Trinity Cathedral Parish
- Catedral Parroquial de la Santísima Trinidad (Spanish)
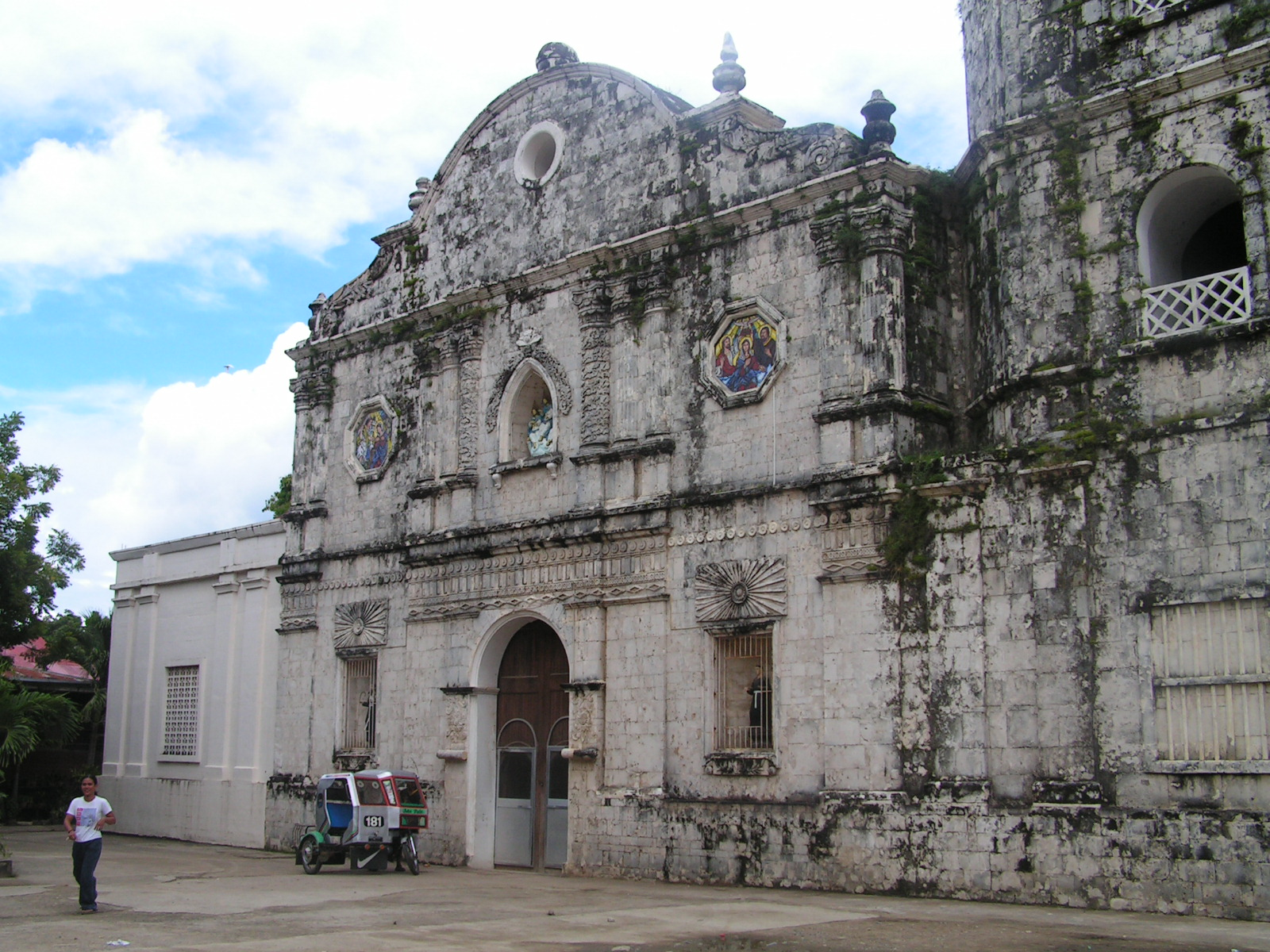
- Talibon Cathedral in 2012

- Location in the Visayas Location in the Philippines
- 10°09′04″N 124°19′35″E
- Location: Talibon, Bohol
- Country: Philippines
- Denomination: Roman Catholic

History
- Status: Cathedral
- Founded: 1722
- Dedication: Holy Trinity
- Consecrated: 1722, 1899

Architecture
- Functional status: Active
- Architectural type: Church building
- Style: Baroque
- Groundbreaking: 1852
- Completed: 1899

Administration
- Archdiocese: Cebu
- Diocese: Talibon

Clergy
- Bishop: Daniel Patrick Y. Parcon

The Most Holy Trinity Cathedral Parish (Spanish: Catedral Parroquial de la Santísima Trinidad), commonly known as Talibon Cathedral, is a Roman Catholic cathedral located at Barangay Poblacion, Talibon, in the Central Visayas province of Bohol, Philippines.

The cathedral follows the Roman or Latin rite and functions as the seat of the Diocese of Talibon (Dioecesis Talibonensis) that was created on January 9, 1986, during the papacy of Pope John Paul II. It is under the pastoral responsibility of Bishop Daniel Patrick Y. Parcon since 2014.

== History ==
On the night of May 1, 1521, in present-day Cebu, the remaining Spaniards after the Battle of Mactan four days earlier, fell into an attack organized by the locals. The lay missionaries aboard Trinidad left the ship as it is continuously attacked, and paddled to the Talibon-Jetafe area for safety. They married local people in the area and subsequently introduced them to Christianity. Talibon then was dedicated to the Most Holy Trinity (Santísima Trinidad), the namesake of their ship. In 1596, members of the Society of Jesus arrived in Bohol to put up parish missions in the island and noticed that lay missions were already active in the area, particularly in Talibon where Magellan's men took refuge in 1521.

The Jesuit mission founded the parish of Talibon in 1722. Construction of the stone church was spearheaded by the Recollects in 1852 under the administration of Lorenzo Mayor. The cathedral's bell tower was added under the helm of José Sánchez, who served the area from 1868 to 1875, and the entire edifice was fully-finished in 1899. The church of Talibon became a cathedral when the diocese was founded in 1986 and is considered as the cradle of Christianity in the province.
