= Raul Dael =

Filipino Roman Catholic clergyman

Raúl Bautista Dáel
- Bishop of Tandag
- Province: Cagayan de Oro
- Diocese: Tandag
- Appointed: 26 February 2018
- Installed: 14 June 2018
- Predecessor: Nereo Odchimar
- Successor: Incumbent

Orders
- Ordination: 7 June 1993
- Consecration: 7 June 2018 by Cardinal Luis Antonio Tagle

Personal details
- Born: Raúl Bautista Dáel; 10 October 1966 (age 59) Jasaan, Misamis Oriental, Philippines
- Denomination: Roman Catholic
- Motto: Duc in Altum
- Coat of arms

Styles of Raul Dael
- Reference style: The Most Reverend
- Spoken style: Your Excellency
- Religious style: Bishop

Raúl Bautista Dáel (born 10 October 1966) is a Filipino Roman Catholic clergyman who is currently the Bishop of the Diocese of Tandag.

== Early life and priesthood ==
He was born in Jasaan, Misamis Oriental on 10 October 1966. After graduating at Xavier University, he studied theology at the Saint John Vianney Seminary of Theology in Cagayan de Oro City.

At 26, he was ordained priest for the Archdiocese of Cagayan de Oro in June 1993. He began his priestly ministry as Parochial Vicar of the Metropolitan Cathedral. In 1995 he was reassigned as Parochial Administrator of St Peter the Apostle parish located in Sugbongcon in Misamis Oriental.

In 2016 he was appointed vicar for the Clergy of the archdiocese of Cagayan de Oro.

== Episcopacy ==
On 26 February 2018 Pope Francis accepted the resignation of Bishop Nereo Odchimar and subsequently appointed Father Raul Dael as Bishop of Tandag.

Bishop Dael was consecrated by Archbishop Cardinal Luis Antonio Tagle of Manila with Cagayan de Oro Archbishop Antonio Ledesma and Bishop-Emeritus Nereo Odchimar as co-consecrators on 7 June 2018. He took possession of the diocese on 14 June 2018.

Catholic Church titles
Preceded by Nereo Odchimar	Bishop of Tandag; 14 June 2018 – present	Incumbent
