= Ireneo A. Amantillo =

Filipino Roman Catholic bishop

His Excellency, The Most Reverend Ireneo Amantillo CSsR, D.D.
- Bishop Emeritus of Tandag
- Metropolis: Cagayan de Oro
- See: Tandag
- Appointed: September 6, 1978
- Installed: November 7, 1978
- Term ended: October 18, 2001
- Predecessor: Diocese erected
- Successor: Nereo Odchimar

Orders
- Ordination: December 16, 1962
- Consecration: March 15, 1976 by Bruno Torpigliani

Personal details
- Born: Ireneo Alisla Amantillo; December 10, 1934 Alimodian, Iloilo, Commonwealth of the Philippines
- Died: October 11, 2018 (aged 83) Cebu City, Philippines
- Motto: Maayong balita alang sa mga kabus (Cebuano for 'Good news for the poor')

Styles of Ireneo Amantillo
- Reference style: His Excellency; The Most Reverend
- Spoken style: Your Excellency
- Religious style: Bishop

Ireneo "Ali" Alisla Amantillo (December 10, 1934 – October 11, 2018) was a Filipino Roman Catholic bishop and was the first bishop of the Roman Catholic Diocese of Tandag located in Tandag City, Surigao del Sur.

Amantillo was born in the Philippines and was ordained to the priesthood in 1962. He served as titular bishop of Girius and was auxiliary bishop of the Roman Catholic Archdiocese of Cagayan de Oro, Philippines from 1976 to 1978. He was appointed by Pope John Paul I on September 6, 1978, and was installed as the first bishop of the Roman Catholic Diocese of Tandag on November 7, 1978. He reigned from 1978 until his retirement in 2001. He died on October 11, 2018, due to prostate cancer.

== Notes ==
Catholic Church titles
New diocese	Bishop of Tandag; November 7, 1978 – October 18, 2001	Succeeded by Nereo Odchimar
Preceded by Louis Prosper Durand	— TITULAR — Bishop of Girus; March 15, 1976 – September 16, 1978	Succeeded by Diosdado Talamayan
