= Noel Pedregosa =

Filipino prelate

His excellency, The Most Reverend Noel Portal Pedregosa STL
- Bishop of Malaybalay
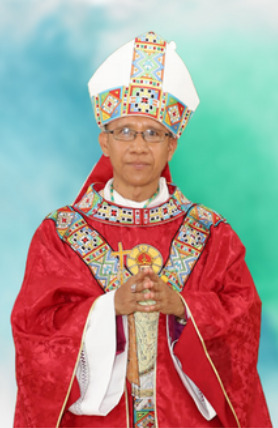
- Diocese: Malaybalay
- Appointed: June 29, 2021
- Installed: September 14, 2021
- Predecessor: Jose Cabantan
- Other posts: Vicar General and Diocesan Administrator, Roman Catholic Diocese of Malaybalay

Orders
- Ordination: September 11, 1991
- Consecration: September 14, 2021

Personal details
- Born: Noel Portal Pedregosa; October 18, 1964 (age 61) M'lang, Cotabato, Philippines
- Motto: Ut Omnes Unum Sint ('That They All May Be One', John 17:21)
- Coat of arms

Styles of Noel Portal Pedregosa
- Reference style: His Excellency; The Most Reverend
- Spoken style: Your Excellency
- Religious style: Bishop

Noel Portal Pedregosa is a Filipino prelate of the Roman Catholic Diocese of Malaybalay, appointed by Pope Francis on June 29, 2021, following Jose Cabantan after he was made the Archbishop of Cagayan de Oro in August 2020. Pedregosa took possession of the Roman Catholic Diocese of Malaybalay on September 14, 2021.

== Biography ==
Pedregosa was born on October 18, 1964, in M'lang, Cotabato, Philippines. He studied philosophy at St. Isidro College in Malaybalay, Bukidnon after attending high school at Loyola High School Don Carlos. He also studied theology at St. John Vianney Theological Seminary in Cagayan de Oro. He also has a degree of Licentiate of Sacred Scripture (S.S.L.) from Loyola School of Theology in Ateneo de Manila University.

He was ordained a priest on September 11, 1991. Since 2017, he has been the Vicar General of the Roman Catholic Diocese of Malaybalay and rector of Saint Isidro Cathedral. In July 2020, he was made the administrator of the Roman Catholic Diocese of Malaybalay.

On September 14, 2021, he was subsequently consecrated to the episcopate and installed as Bishop of Malaybalay by his Predecessor Most Rev. Jose Cabantan, Archbishop of Cagayan de Oro and co-consecrators: Most Rev. Angelito Lampon and Most Rev. Raul Dael.

Catholic Church titles
Preceded by Jose Cabantan	Bishop of Malaybalay; 2021—present	Succeeded by Incumbent
