= Jesus Tuquib =

Filipino archbishop (1930–2019)

His Excellency, The Most Reverend Jesus B. Tuquib D.D., S.T.D.
- Metropolitan Archbishop Emeritus of Cagayan de Oro
- Province: Cagayan de Oro
- See: Cagayan de Oro
- Appointed: March 31, 1984 (Coadjutor)
- Installed: January 5, 1988
- Retired: March 4, 2006
- Predecessor: Patrick H. Cronin, S.S.C.M.E.
- Successor: Antonio J. Ledesma, S.J.
- Previous posts: Bishop of Pagadian (1973–1984); Coadjutor Archbishop of Cagayan de Oro (1984–1988)

Orders
- Ordination: March 14, 1959
- Consecration: May 29, 1973 by Manuel Mascariñas y Morgia

Personal details
- Born: Jesus Balaso Tuquib; June 27, 1930 Clarin, Bohol, Philippine Islands
- Died: August 1, 2019 (aged 89) Cagayan de Oro
- Buried: Saint Augustine Metropolitan Cathedral, Cagayan de Oro
- Denomination: Roman Catholicism
- Education: San Carlos Minor Seminary
- Alma mater: University of Santo Tomas
- Motto: Diligamus nos Invicem ("Let us love one another")
- Coat of arms

Jesus Balaso Tuquib (June 27, 1930 – August 1, 2019) was a Filipino archbishop of the Roman Catholic Church. He was the Archbishop Emeritus of the Archdiocese of Cagayan de Oro in the Philippines. Tuquib first assumed episcopal office as Bishop of the Diocese of Pagadian.

== Background ==
Styles of Jesus B. Tuquib
- Reference style: The Most Reverend
- Spoken style: Your Excellency
- Religious style: Archbishop

Born Jesus Balaso Tuquib on June 27, 1930, in Clarin, Bohol, Philippines, he was ordained priest on March 14, 1959.

Tuquib attended the San Carlos Minor Seminary in Argao, Cebu, Philippines. He attained his degree in theology from the San Carlos Major Seminary in Mabolo, Cebu, Philippines. In 1964, he graduated with a degree in secondary education. By 1967, he completed his doctorate in Sacred Theology from the University of Santo Tomas.

== Ministry ==
=== Sacerdotal ===
As priest, Tuquib spent most of his pastoral work in parishes. He also lectured in seminaries.

Position	Term of Office	Organization
Assistant Priest	1959	Tubigon, Bohol
Professor	1959–1960	Sacred Heart Seminary in Bacolod
Professor; Prefect of Discipline; Spiritual Director	1960–1965	Immaculate Heart of Mary Seminary in Tagbiliran, Bohol
Chancellor	1967–1972	Diocese of Dipolog
Administrator	1990–1997	Our Lady of the Rosary Cathedral in Dipolog

=== Episcopal ===
Pope Paul VI appointed Tuquib to be the Bishop of the Diocese of Pagadian on February 24, 1973. During his reign as Bishop of Pagadian, the Diocese of Pagadian took over the administration and control of the schools of the Missionary Society of St. Columban, including Saint Columban College. The transfer started what is now known as the Diocesan Schools Group of Pagadian, the network of sixteen schools under the control of the Bishop of Pagadian.

Eleven years later, Pope John Paul II appointed him as the Coadjutor Archbishop to Archbishop Patrick Cronin of the Archdiocese of Cagayan de Oro. Upon Cronin's retirement, Tuquib succeeded as Archbishop of Cagayan de Oro. On March 3, 2006, he retired and consequently became the Archbishop Emeritus.

Catholic Church titles
Preceded by Patrick Cronin	Archbishop of Cagayan de Oro; January 5, 1988 – March 4, 2006	Succeeded by Antonio Ledesma
New diocese	Bishop of Pagadian; February 24, 1973 – March 31, 1984	Succeeded by Antonio Tobias
