= Patrick Cronin (bishop) =

Irish Roman Catholic Columban archbishop and missionary

The Most Reverend Patrick H. Cronin S.S.C.M.E., D.D.
- Archbishop of Cagayan de Oro
- Province: Ecclesiastical Province of Cagayan de Oro
- See: Cagayan de Oro
- Installed: 13 October 1970
- Term ended: 5 January 1988
- Predecessor: James T. G. Hayes, S.J.
- Successor: Jesus B. Tuquib
- Other posts: Founder, St. John Vianney Theological Seminary
- Previous posts: Prelate of Ozamis; Titular Bishop of Ubaza

Orders
- Ordination: 21 December 1937; Missionary Society of St. Columban
- Consecration: 25 September 1955 (at the chapel of St. Columban's College, Dalgan Park, Navan, County Meath, Ireland) by John Anthony Kyne

Personal details
- Born: Patrick Henry Cronin; 30 November 1913 County Offaly, Ireland
- Died: 19 February 1991 (aged 77) Cagayan de Oro, Philippines
- Buried: Saint Augustine Metropolitan Cathedral, Cagayan de Oro
- Denomination: Roman Catholicism
- Education: St. Finian's College; Columban Missionary College, Dalgan Park
- Motto: Quis ut Deus ("Who [is] like God?")
- Coat of arms: Patrick H. Cronin's coat of arms

Patrick Henry Cronin, S.S.C.M.E. (30 November 1913 – 9 February 1991) was an Irish, Roman Catholic, Columban archbishop and missionary. He was the first prelate of the Prelature of Ozamis and the second Archbishop of Cagayan de Oro in the Philippines, serving during World War II.

== Background ==
Born Patrick Henry Cronin on 30 November 1913 in Moneygall, County Offaly, Ireland. He was ordained priest on 21 December 1937.

Cronin attended the Tullamore Christian Brothers School and St. Finian's College in Mullingar, Ireland. In 1931, he entered the Dalgan Park the Columban Fathers' Seminary. Six years later, he was ordained as priest under the Missionary Society of St. Columban.

== Ministry ==
On 24 May 1955 Cronin was appointed as the Prelate of Ozamis in the Philippines. Concurrently, he was the Titular Bishop of Ubaza. Upon the retirement Archbishop James Hayes on 13 October 1970, he was appointed as Archbishop of Cagayan de Oro in 1971.

As Archbishop of Cagayan de Oro, he established the St. John Vianney Theological Seminary in Cagayan de Oro, an interdiocesan theological seminary that provides formation for candidates for priesthood. After retiring on 5 January 1988 he was succeeded by Jesus Tuquib and given the title Archbishop Emeritus. He then lived at the archdiocesan seminary until his death on 9 February 1991 in Maria Reyna Hospital (now Maria Reyna Xavier University Hospital) in Cagayan de Oro, Philippines. His remains had been interred at the Saint Augustine Metropolitan Cathedral.

Styles of Patrick Cronin
- Reference style: The Most Reverend
- Spoken style: Your Excellency
- Religious style: Archbishop

== See also ==
- Missionary Society of St. Columban
- Archdiocese of Cagayan de Oro

Catholic Church titles
| Preceded by James Hayes | Archbishop of Cagayan de Oro; 1971–1988 | Succeeded by Jesus Tuquib |
| Preceded by New Creation | Bishop-Prelate of Ozamis; 1955–1970 | Succeeded by Jesus Varela |
