= St. Mary's Academy of Carmen =

Location
- Villarin St., Carmen, Cagayan de Oro, Misamis Oriental; Philippines; 8°28′52″N 124°37′51″E

Information
- Former names: Liceo de Cagayan High School (1963-1964); Cathedral High School (1964-1977); Cathedral School of Technology (1977-1999)
- Type: Private, Roman Catholic, non-stock, Coeducational Basic and Higher education institution
- Motto: Initium Sapientiae Timor Domini (Latin) (The fear of the Lord is the beginning of wisdom)
- Religious affiliations: Roman Catholic; (RVM Sisters)
- Established: 1963; 63 years ago
- Founder: Archbishop James T.G. Hayes, S.J., D.D
- Directress / Principal: Sr. Ma. Adelaida Huiso, RVM
- Campus: Urban; 5.4266 hectares (54,266 m^{2})
- Colors: Blue and White
- Mascot: Blue Seraphims
- Nickname: Marians
- Affiliation: PAASCU; CEAP
- Website: www.smac.edu.ph/home

St. Mary's Academy of Carmen, is a Catholic co-educational basic education institution owned and managed by the Congregation of the Religious of the Virgin Mary (RVM) in Cagayan de Oro, Misamis Oriental, Philippines.

== History ==
St. Mary's Academy of Carmen was founded in 1963 by the Archbishop James T.G. Hayes, S.J., D.D. to answer the need for Catholic education intended for middle class and poor families in the Archdiocese. The school was named Cathedral High School, initially offering first year and second year with an enrollment of 498 students.

The first RVM community was affiliated to Lourdes College, with Mother Maria Virginia Banes, R.V.M., as the local superior.

Through the generosity of Atty. Rodolfo Pelaez, the owner of Liceo de Cagayan (now Liceo de Cagayan University), Cathedral High School was allowed to use its building from 7:30 in the morning to 3:30 in the afternoon. For two years the school carried the name Liceo de Cagayan High School. The school's first principal was Sr. Ma. Rosario Carino, R.V.M. and was succeeded by Sr. Ma. Diosdada Loquellano, R.V.M.

The RVM sisters were compelled to build a four-storey concrete building when the enrollment increased to 997 students from the first year to fourth year levels. The school has an area of 54,266 sq.m., located along Villarin Street, near the Parish of Our Lady of Mt. Carmel, a walking distance from J.R. Borja Memorial City Hospital.

In 1977, the school was renamed to Cathedral School of Technology with the recognition of its Two-Year Agricultural Technology Course. The short-lived home technology course was opened in 1979.

The prospect for expansion as a technology school was seen when the school acquired a farm lot of 36 hectares in Bulao, Iponan. A one-classroom building was constructed in 1991 for the Responding to the challenge of providing quality education, the school started dreaming of having the school accredited as early as 1980. On October 30–31, 1995, a team of six members from Philippine Accrediting Association of Schools, Colleges, and Universities (PAASCU) visited the school for its Preliminary Survey. The team recommended the school for formal visit which took place on October 20–21, 1997. The school was granted Level I Accreditation in April 1998.

In school year 1998-1999, LC-TVET was transferred to Cathedral School of Technology. This has allowed Cathedral School of Technology to reach out to the out-of-school youth of Cagayan de Oro.

On September 12, 1999, Cathedral School of Technology was renamed to St. Mary's Academy of Carmen. The renaming was made in response to the RVM Congregational mandate of renaming all RVM schools to St. Mary's as an act of thanksgiving for the Jubilee Year and for stronger bonding of the forty nine RVM owned and managed schools, six RVM administered Diocesan schools and seven overseas mission formal schools.

Another formal accreditation survey was conducted on February 5–6, 2001. The school was granted Level II accreditation. The resurvey visit done on February 13–14, 2006 was successful as the school was able to maintain Level II re-accreditation status for another five years. At present the school is working for the Level III status.

== See also ==
- Religious of the Virgin Mary
- Mother Ignacia del Espiritu Santo
