= Diocese of Malaybalay =

Latin Catholic diocese in the Philippines

Diocese of Malaybalay Dioecesis Malaibalaiensis Diyosesis sa Malaybalay Diyosesis ta Malaybalay Diyosesis ng Malaybalay Diocesis de Malaybalay

Catholic
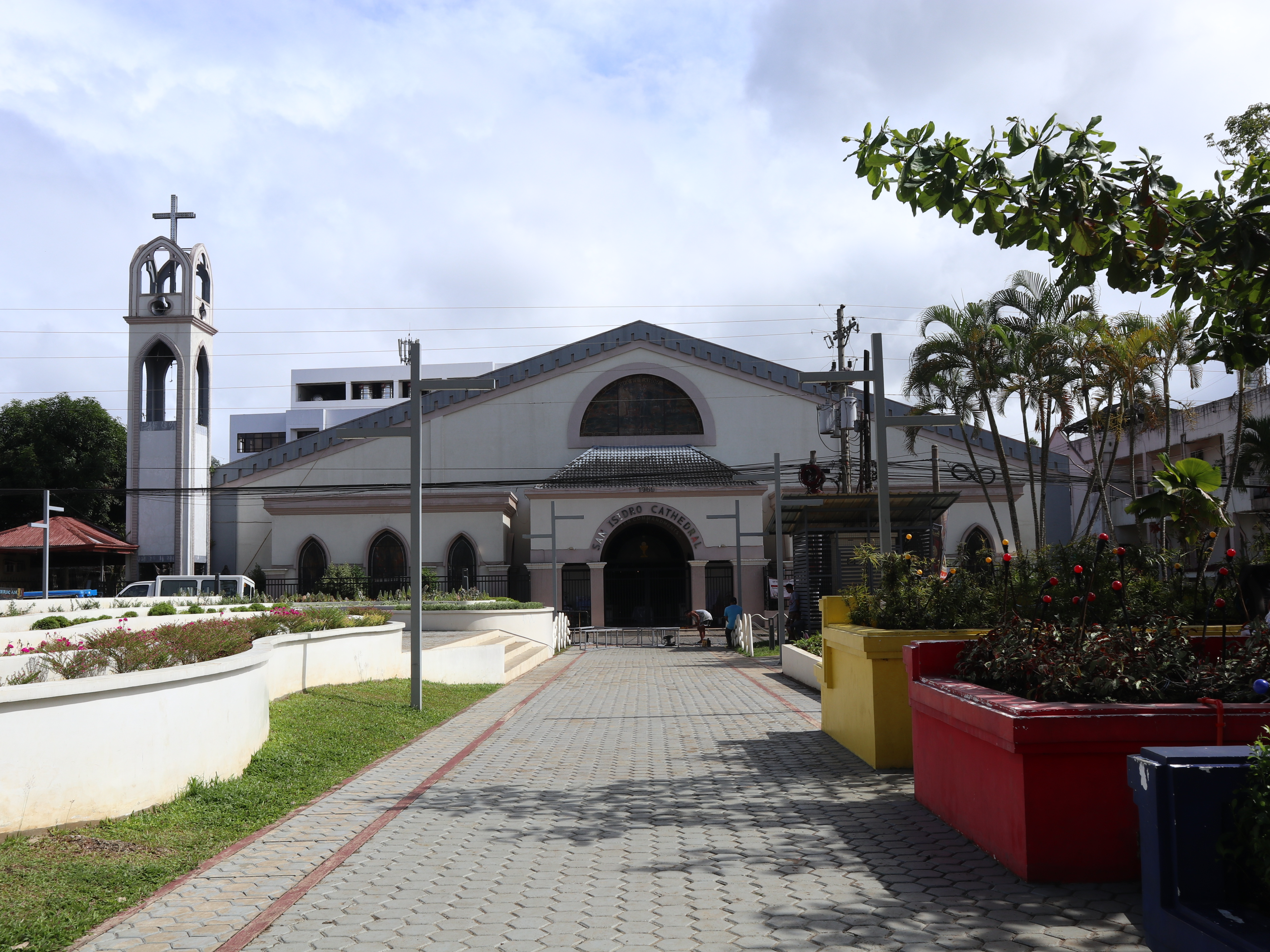
- Malaybalay Cathedral

- Coat of arms

Location
- Country: Philippines
- Territory: All of Bukidnon (except Malitbog); Wao, Lanao del Sur; Barangay Buda, Davao City
- Ecclesiastical province: Cagayan de Oro
- Metropolitan: Cagayan de Oro
- Coordinates: 8°09′16″N 125°07′46″E

Statistics
- Area: 8,294 km^{2} (3,202 sq mi)
- Population: Total; Catholics: (as of 2021); 1,868,476; 1,460,653 (78.2%)
- Parishes: 54

Information
- Denomination: Catholic Church
- Sui iuris church: Latin Church
- Rite: Roman Rite
- Established: November 15, 1982
- Cathedral: Cathedral of St. Isidore the Farmer
- Patron saint: Isidore the Farmer
- Secular priests: 86

Current leadership
- Pope: Leo XIV
- Bishop: Noel P. Pedregosa
- Metropolitan Archbishop: José A. Cabantan
- Vicar General: Fr. Cirilo Sajelan (North); Fr. Herminigildo Alinas (South)
- All current statistics are based from updated data taken by Catholic-Hierarchy.org.

The Diocese of Malaybalay (Lat: Dioecesis Malaibalaiensis) is a diocese of the Latin Church of the Catholic Church in the Philippines.

== Diocesan history ==
The diocese was erected on April 25, 1969, as the Territorial Prelature of Malaybalay. On November 15, 1982, the prelature was elevated to a full diocese.

The diocese is a suffragan of the Archdiocese of Cagayan de Oro. On June 29, 2021, Pope Francis named Fr. Noel Pedregosa, then-Apostolic Administrator as the fifth bishop of Malaybalay replacing Jose Cabantan who was appointed Archbishop of Cagayan de Oro.

== Area of coverage ==
The Diocese covers the province of Bukidnon, except the municipality of Malitbog (which is under the Archdiocese of Cagayan de Oro), the municipality of Wao, Lanao del Sur, and Barangay Buda in Davao City (on the Bukidnon – Davao del Sur boundary). It covers an area of 8,294 square kilometers with a population of 1,726,520 (81.6% of which are Catholics).

== Ordinaries ==
=== Diocesan bishops ===
| Bishop | | Period in Office | Coat of Arms |
|---|---|---|---|
| 1. | Francisco F. Claver, S.J.† | June 18, 1969 – September 14, 1984 (15 years, 88 days) | |
| 2. | Gaudencio B. Rosales | September 14, 1984 – December 30, 1992 (8 years, 107 days) | |
| 3. | Honesto C. Pacana, S.J.† | March 24, 1994 – May 15, 2010 (16 years, 123 days) | |
| 4. | Jose A. Cabantan | May 15, 2010 – August 28, 2020 (10 years, 105 days) | |
| 5. | Noel P. Pedregosa | June 29, 2021 – present (4 years, 205 days) | |

=== Affiliated bishops ===
- Jose R. Manguiran (December 27, 1966 – May 27, 1987, appointed Bishop of Dipolog)
- Noel P. Pedregosa (September 12, 1991 – June 29, 2021, appointed Bishop of Malaybalay)
- Elenito Galido (April 25, 1979 – March 25, 2006, appointed Bishop of Iligan)

== See also ==
- Catholic Church in the Philippines
