= James Hayes (bishop) =

American Catholic Jesuit archbishop and missionary

The Most Reverend James T. G. Hayes S.J., D.D.
- Archbishop of Cagayan de Oro
- Portrait of Hayes
- Province: Ecclesiastical Province of Cagayan de Oro
- See: Cagayan de Oro
- Installed: 29 June 1951
- Term ended: 13 October 1970
- Predecessor: Inaugural holder First Archbishop of Cagayan de Oro also, First Bishop of Cagayan de Oro
- Successor: Patrick Cronin
- Other posts: Founder, Xavier University; Founder, Lourdes College
- Previous posts: Bishop of Cagayan de Oro; Provincial superior of the Society of Jesus in the Philippines

Orders
- Ordination: 29 June 1921
- Consecration: 18 June 1933 by Patrick Joseph Hayes

Personal details
- Born: James Thomas Gibbons Hayes; 11 February 1889 New York City, United States
- Died: 28 March 1980 (aged 91) Cagayan de Oro, Philippines
- Buried: Saint Augustine Metropolitan Cathedral in Cagayan de Oro, Philippines
- Denomination: Catholicism
- Education: Woodstock College in Maryland, U.S.
- Motto: Ut Omnes Unum Sint ("That they all may be one")
- Coat of arms: James T. G. Hayes's coat of arms

Styles of James T. G. Hayes
- Reference style: The Most Reverend
- Spoken style: Your Excellency
- Religious style: Archbishop

Ordination history of James Hayes
History
Episcopal consecration
- Consecrated by: Patrick Joseph Cardinal Hayes
Episcopal succession
Bishops consecrated by James Hayes as principal consecrator
- Clovis Joseph Thibault, P.M.E.: 11 February 1955
- Charles Van den Ouwelant, M.S.C.: 21 June 1955

James Thomas Gibbons Hayes, S.J. (11 February 1889 – 28 March 1980) was an American, Catholic, Jesuit archbishop and missionary who served as the first Archbishop of Cagayan de Oro in the Philippines.

== Background ==
Hayes was born on 11 February 1889 in New York City, New York, United States. He attended the St. Francis Xavier College in New York City and Woodstock College in Maryland. He also studied in Tronchiennes, Belgium.

He started a career as a teacher, teaching at Regis High School in New York City. From 1918 to 1919, he taught the Classics at the Boston College in Chestnut Hill, Massachusetts. He then served as Dean of Discipline at Fordham University from 1923 to 1925.

== Ministry ==
In 1907, Hayes entered the Society of Jesus. On 29 June 1921, he was ordained priest. He moved to the Philippines to do missionary work in 1926. A year after, he already started serving as the Superior of the Jesuits in Mindanao. By 1930, he became Superior of the Jesuits in the Philippines, a position he held until 1933.

On 20 January 1933, the new diocese of Cagayan de Oro was created by Pope Pius XI through the Papal bull "Ad maius religionis". Hayes was appointed as the first bishop of the new diocese and ordained as bishop on 16 March 1933 and 18 June 1933 respectively.

On 29 June 1951, Pope Pius XII, through the Papal bull "Quo Phillipina Republica", elevated the Diocese of Cagayan de Oro to an archdiocese and appointed Hayes as the first Archbishop.

He retired on 13 October 1970 and was succeeded by Patrick Cronin. Consequently, he became Archbishop Emeritus of Cagayan de Oro and titular bishop of Gabii. On 2 December 1970, he resigned as Titular bishop of Gabii. He died on 28 March 1980.

== Legacy ==
In 1928, Hayes founded the San Agustin Parochial School, the predecessor of the present Lourdes College in Cagayan de Oro.

He then founded boys school Ateneo de Cagayan, now Xavier University, and became its first President.

In 1956, in order to respond to the growing number of priests in the diocese, Hayes founded the San Jose de Mindanao Seminary.

In recognition of Archbishop Hayes' role in the history of Cagayan de Oro, the road traversing from the north wing of the Cagayan de Oro City Hall to the St. John Vianney Theological Seminary was named after him.

Catholic Church titles
New creation	Archbishop of Cagayan de Oro; 1951–1970	Succeeded by Patrick Cronin
New creation	Bishop of Cagayan de Oro; 1933–1951	Elevated to archdiocese
