= Daniel Parcon =

Filipino prelate (born 1962)

His Excellency, The Most Reverend Patrick Daniel Yee Parcon D.D.
- Bishop of Talibon
- Province: Cebu
- Diocese: Talibon
- Appointed: June 3, 2014
- Installed: August 26, 2014
- Predecessor: Christian Vicente F. Noel
- Successor: Incumbent
- Previous post: Diocesan Administrator of San Carlos (2011–2013)

Orders
- Ordination: April 24, 1994 by Nicolas M. Mondejar
- Consecration: August 22, 2014 by José S. Palma

Personal details
- Born: Patrick Daniel Yee Parcon; November 24, 1962 (age 63) Vallehermoso, Negros Oriental, Philippines
- Denomination: Roman Catholic
- Education: Fordham University
- Motto: Christus Fortitudo Mea (Latin for 'Christ is my strength')
- Coat of arms: Patrick Daniel Yee Parcon's coat of arms

Ordination history
History
Priestly ordination
- Ordained by: Nicolas M. Mondejar
Episcopal consecration
- Principal consecrator: José S. Palma
- Co-consecrators: Gerardo Alminaza; Jose Advincula
- Styles
- Reference style: His Excellency; The Most Reverend
- Spoken style: Your Excellency
- Religious style: Bishop

Patrick Daniel Yee Parcon (born November 24, 1962) is the current bishop of the Roman Catholic Diocese of Talibon in the Philippines.

== Early life and education ==
Parcon was born on November 24, 1962, in Vallehermoso, Negros Oriental. He studied Bachelor of Science in chemistry from Silliman University. He completed his philosophical studies from St. Joseph Seminary in Sibulan, Negros Oriental, and theological formation from St. Joseph Regional Seminary in Iloilo City. He also acquired a master's degree in Religion & Religious Education with core specialization in Christian Spirituality from Fordham University in New York City.

== Priesthood ==
Parcon was ordained a priest for the Roman Catholic Diocese of San Carlos (Philippines) on April 24, 1994.

== Episcopate ==
On June 3, 2014, Pope Francis appointed Parcon as the Bishop of Talibon to succeed the retiring Christian Vicente Noel. He received episcopal consecration on August 22, 2014; Archbishop José S. Palma consecrated Parcon to the episcopate while Gerardo Alminaza and Jose Advincula were co-consecrators. He was installed on August 26, 2014, by Archbishop Giuseppe Pinto, Apostolic Nuncio to the Philippines.

Catholic Church titles
Preceded by Christian Vicente Noel	Bishop of Talibon; August 26, 2014 – present	Incumbent
