= Lourdes College (Cagayan de Oro) =

Roman Catholic college in the Philippines

Lourdes College Cagayan de Oro City
- Seal
- Former names: San Agustin Parochial School (1928-1933); Lourdes Academy (1933-1943); Lourdes Junior College (1943-1947)
- Motto: Initium Sapientiae Timor Domini (Latin)
- Motto in English: The Fear of the Lord is the Beginning of Wisdom
- Type: Private
- Established: 1928; 98 years ago
- Founder: Archbp. James T.G. Hayes, SJ
- Religious affiliation: Roman Catholic (Religious of the Virgin Mary)
- Academic affiliations: PAASCU
- President: S. Ma. Miraflor A. Bahan, RVM
- Location: Cagayan de Oro, Misamis Oriental, 9000, Philippines; 8°29′N 124°38′E
- Colors: and Pink and white
- Website: www.lccdo.edu.ph
- Location in Mindanao Location in the Philippines

Lourdes College Cagayan de Oro City (LCCDO), officially Lourdes College, Inc., is a private, Roman Catholic basic and higher education institution managed by the Congregation of the Religious of the Virgin Mary in Cagayan de Oro City, Misamis Oriental, Philippines. It was founded by Archbishop James T.G. Hayes, S.J. in 1928. It is a member of the Philippine Accrediting Association of Schools, Colleges and Universities (PAASCU). The school has two campuses: the Integrated Basic Education Department (IBED) in Barangay Macasandig, and the Higher Education Department (HED) on Capistrano-Hayes Sts.

== History ==
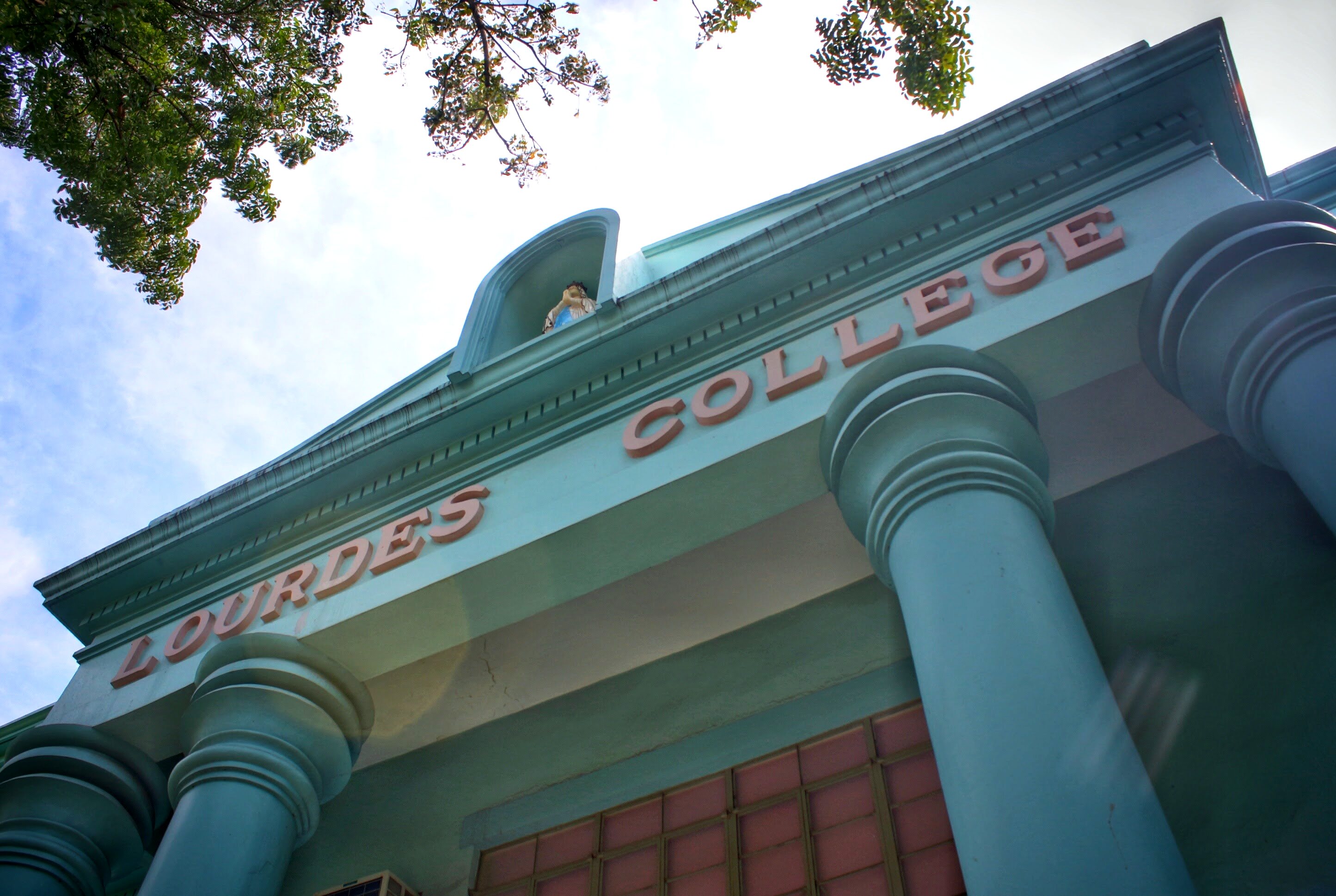
Lourdes College Inc. main facade

=== Early years ===
In 1928, Archbishop James T.G. Hayes, S.J., founded the San Agustin Parochial School for both elementary boys and girls. Soon after its establishment, the school was divided into boys and girls divisions. The latter became Lourdes Academy, managed by the R.V.M. sisters, while the former, today's Xavier University, was run by the Jesuits.

A decade after, a year following the graduation of the first high school students, it became Lourdes Junior College, at the same time offering Junior Normal and Home Economics courses. The next four years were a period of difficulty for the school, with the brand-new buildings razed by fire on May 2, 1939, and the onset of World War II, hampering normal school operations.

=== After World War II ===
In 1947, two years after resuming normal operations, the school became Lourdes College, after offering Teacher Education for the first time. A two-storey building was constructed along Real St. (now called Capistrano St.) in 1952, with a third floor added the year after. Then in 1965, the seven-storey Library and Science Building was constructed. This was Cagayan de Oro's first high-rise structure, as well as becoming one of the city's landmarks.

In 1970, the Grade School Level was transferred to a three-hectare land in Macasandig, Cagayan de Oro, together with Xavier University Grade School. The two schools were located in a three-storey complex, and the agreement included the sharing of common school facilities.

Six years later, a self-survey took place at all three school levels, under the leadership of the Directress, Sr. Ma. Lourdes Palacio, RVM, following the guidelines laid out by PAASCU. This was followed by a more intensive self-survey in the school year 1977–78. Then in 1979, the PAASCU formal survey was conducted, which resulted in granting the school a three-year accredited status. In 1980, the school underwent another PAASCU survey; both the Grade School and High School were awarded a five-year accredited status, while the Education and Liberal Arts Programs were granted a seven-year accredited status.

In the school year 1987–88, the Mother Ignacia Social Concerns Center, Inc. (MISCCI) was created as Lourdes College's community service arm. The same year saw the start of Buhay: Mother Ignacia Development Project, which opened the Mother Ignacia School, funded by MISEREOR (The German Catholic Bishops’ Organization for Development Cooperation). This aimed to educate the youth and their parents living in Lower Dagong, Carmen, Cagayan de Oro. The project was turned over to the community after ten years and is now managed by the Department of Education (DepEd).

At the same time, the Mother Ignacia Night High School started, set-up to teach daughters of lower income families, as well as those working during the day.

The Mother Ignacia Housing Project, jointly funded by MISEREOR and Lourdes College, began in 1991. A total of 110 houses were built. Three years later, MISCCI, representing Mindanao, received the National Award for Community Service (NACS) from the Rotary Club of Makati and San Miguel Corporation. The housing project also became one of the entrants of the Asian Regional Consultation for Habitat II in April 1996. It was then nominated as one of the Habitat entries for Asia.

Since acquiring PAASCU recognition, the school has had several revisits to maintain its accreditation status. One of them, in 1994, granted the Grade School and High School Departments Level II Accreditation status. In February and March 1999, the newly created Basic Education Department underwent another revisit; both the High School and Grade School were granted a further five years of accredited status.

The college also had another PAASCU revisit in November of the following year for Teacher Education and Liberal Arts, as well as a preliminary visit for Commerce and a separate one for Social Work in the school year after. All of the programs received five years of accredited status, except for Social Work, which was granted three years.

On August 22–23, 2005, the Teacher Education, Liberal Arts, Commerce and Social Work Programs were awarded Level II Accreditation status for another five years. A preliminary visit for the Hotel and Restaurant Management (HRM) Program was also conducted at the same time.

Three years later, on May 9, 2008, the Teacher Education, Arts and Sciences and Commerce Programs gained Level III Accreditation status, and on May 25, 2009, the Social Work Program received a further five-year Accreditation status.

=== Marinela Neri Velez String Program ===
Marinela Neri Velez, a local philanthropist and music enthusiast, asked the help of Ms. Ana Maria dela Fuente, the Lourdes College music coordinator, with the formation of a music scholarship program. This 10-year program was to be funded by Marinela Neri Velez in partnership with the Manila Symphony Orchestra, with the eventual aim of forming a symphony orchestra for Cagayan de Oro.

On December 4, 2013, Lourdes College launched the Marinela Neri Velez String Program at the school's auditorium, when they performed alongside the MSO as part of their December Rhapsody concert. Aside from performing regularly with the Lourdes College Chorale, the string ensemble also played at the Limketkai Luxe Hotel on December 21–24, 2015.

== Official seal ==
The central motif of Lourdes College's official seal stands for Ave Maria (Hail Mary) or Auspice Maria (under the guidance of Mary), in reference to Mary, the Mother of God, and the Patroness of the RVM Congregation. Surrounding the Ave Maria is a crescent moon, symbolizing Mary's humility. The sun represents Jesus Christ as the Son of Justice, and the moon Mary, since only Jesus, her Son, makes her shine.

The twelve stars around the motif signify the stars St. John saw, as mentioned in the Book of Revelation, as well as the extraordinary graces bestowed on Mary.

In the lower half the seal is the image of an open book with the Latin phrase: Initium Sapientiae Timor Domini, or "The Fear of the Lord is the Beginning of Wisdom." Below it is a white sampaguita flower, the national flower of the Philippines. It signifies the Religious of the Virgin Mary, which was the first Filipino congregation founded by a Filipina, Mother Ignacia del Espiritu Santo.

== See also ==
- St. Mary's Academy of Carmen
