= Antonio Ledesma =

Filipino Catholic prelate (born 1943)

His Excellency, The Most Reverend Antonio J. Ledesma S.J., D.D.
- Metropolitan Archbishop Emeritus of Cagayan de Oro
- Church: Catholic
- Archdiocese: Cagayan de Oro
- Province: Cagayan de Oro
- Appointed: March 4, 2006
- Installed: May 30, 2006
- Retired: June 23, 2020
- Predecessor: Jesus Tuquib
- Successor: Jose Cabantan
- Previous posts: Vice-President, Catholic Bishops' Conference of the Philippines; Prelate of Ipil (1997–2006); Coadjutor Prelate of Ipil (1996–97)

Orders
- Ordination: April 16, 1973 by Jaime Sin
- Consecration: August 31, 1996 by Gian Vincenzo Moreni

Personal details
- Born: Antonio Javellana Ledesma; March 28, 1943 (age 83) Iloilo City, Commonwealth of the Philippines
- Residence: Archbishop's House; Cagayan de Oro, Philippines
- Education: Ateneo de Manila University (undergraduate); University of the Philippines (M.A.); University of Wisconsin–Madison (Ph.D.)
- Motto: Opus Solidaritatis Pax (Latin for 'Peace is the Fruit of Solidarity')
- Coat of arms: Antonio J. Ledesma's coat of arms

Ordination history
History
Priestly ordination
- Ordained by: Jaime Sin
Episcopal consecration
- Principal consecrator: Gian Vincenzo Moreni
- Co-consecrators: Jesus Tuquib; Federico O. Escaler
Episcopal succession
Bishops consecrated by Antonio Ledesma as principal consecrator
- Cosme Almedilla: June 25, 2019
- Styles
- Reference style: The Most Reverend
- Spoken style: Your Excellency
- Religious style: Archbishop

Antonio Javellana Ledesma, S.J. (born March 28, 1943) is a Filipino Catholic prelate who served as the archbishop of the Archdiocese of Cagayan de Oro in the Philippines from 2006 to 2020.

== Early life ==
Born on March 28, 1943, in Iloilo City, Philippines. He spent his elementary years at St. Aloysius School and later at the Ateneo de Manila. Since then, he remained with the Ateneo until he finished his degree in history and government, graduating magna cum laude in 1963.

He studied philosophy and theology at the Loyola House of Studies from 1966 to 1968 and from 1970 to 1973, respectively. He attained his master's degree in political science from the University of the Philippines. He attended the University of Wisconsin–Madison in the United States, completing his doctorate in development in 1980.

== Ministry ==
=== Priesthood ===
On May 30, 1963, Ledesma entered the Society of Jesus. He was ordained priest on April 16, 1973.

He served as an assistant parish priest in Siay, Zamboanga Sibugay, from 1980 to 1981. From 1982 to 1996, he worked as a professor and was assigned to various positions in Xavier University. He taught sociology, economics, and religious studies.

Position	Term of Office	Organization
Dean	1984–1994	College of Agriculture, Xavier University
Director	1984–1994	Southeast Asia Rural Social Leadership Institute
Director	1984–1996	Xavier University College of Agriculture – Manresa Farm Complex
Executive Vice President	1984–1996	Xavier Science Foundation
Executive Vice President	1994–1996	Xavier University
Dean	1994–1996	College of Arts and Sciences, Xavier University

During the same period, he sat as chairman of different societies and non-governmental organizations.

Position	Term of Office	Organization
Chairman	1985–1986	Philippine Sociology Society
Chairman	1985–1990	Philippine Partnership for the Development Of Human Resources in Rural Areas
Chairman	1984–1996	Asian NGO Coalition for Agrarian Reform and Rural Development
Chairman	1994	Philippine Agrarian Reform Foundation for National Development

=== Episcopate ===
Pope John Paul II appointed Ledesma as Coadjutor Prelate of Ipil on June 13, 1996. He succeeded Federico O. Escaler as the Prelate of Ipil on June 28, 1997.

On March 4, 2006, he was appointed by Pope Benedict XVI as Archbishop of Cagayan de Oro; he was installed on May 30. During his term, he has led the Catholic Bishops' Conference of the Philippines as Chairman of the Episcopal Commission on Inter-religious Dialogue since 2009. He has convened local religious leaders in inter-religious dialogues on different social issues. In the aftermath of Typhoon Sendong and in the absence of local government leadership, he led the multi-sectoral relief effort to address the needs of calamity victims.

During the 2016 Philippine presidential election, he wrote a pastoral letter calling out presidential candidate Rodrigo Duterte for his inaction on the rising number of extrajudicial killings in Davao City where the latter was mayor. One month into the presidency of eventual winner Duterte, Ledesma made a call to stop extrajudicial killings. He said:

We condemn the killings because it is not only against the law, but also to the Constitution and morality. Killing without due process is certainly condemnable… We should all respect dignity of human life.

Ledesma has also supported efforts to resolve Mindanao's protracted struggle with Muslim separatists. He has spoken and advocated for the Bangsamoro Basic Law.

On June 23, 2020, Pope Francis accepted his retirement as Archbishop of Cagayan de Oro and was succeeded by then-Malaybalay Bishop Jose Cabantan.

== See also ==
- Catholic Church in the Philippines
- Hierarchy of the Catholic Church
- Historical list of the Catholic bishops of the Philippines
- List of Catholic bishops in the Philippines
- Lists of popes, patriarchs, primates, archbishops, and bishops

Catholic Church titles
Preceded by Jesus Tuquib	Archbishop of Cagayan de Oro; March 4, 2006 – June 23, 2020	Succeeded by Jose Cabantan
Preceded by Federico O. Escaler	Prelate of Ipil; June 28, 1997 – March 4, 2006; Coadjutor: August 31, 1996 – June 28, 1997	Succeeded by Julius S. Tonel
