= Higalaay Festival =

Annual festival in Cagayan de Oro, Philippines

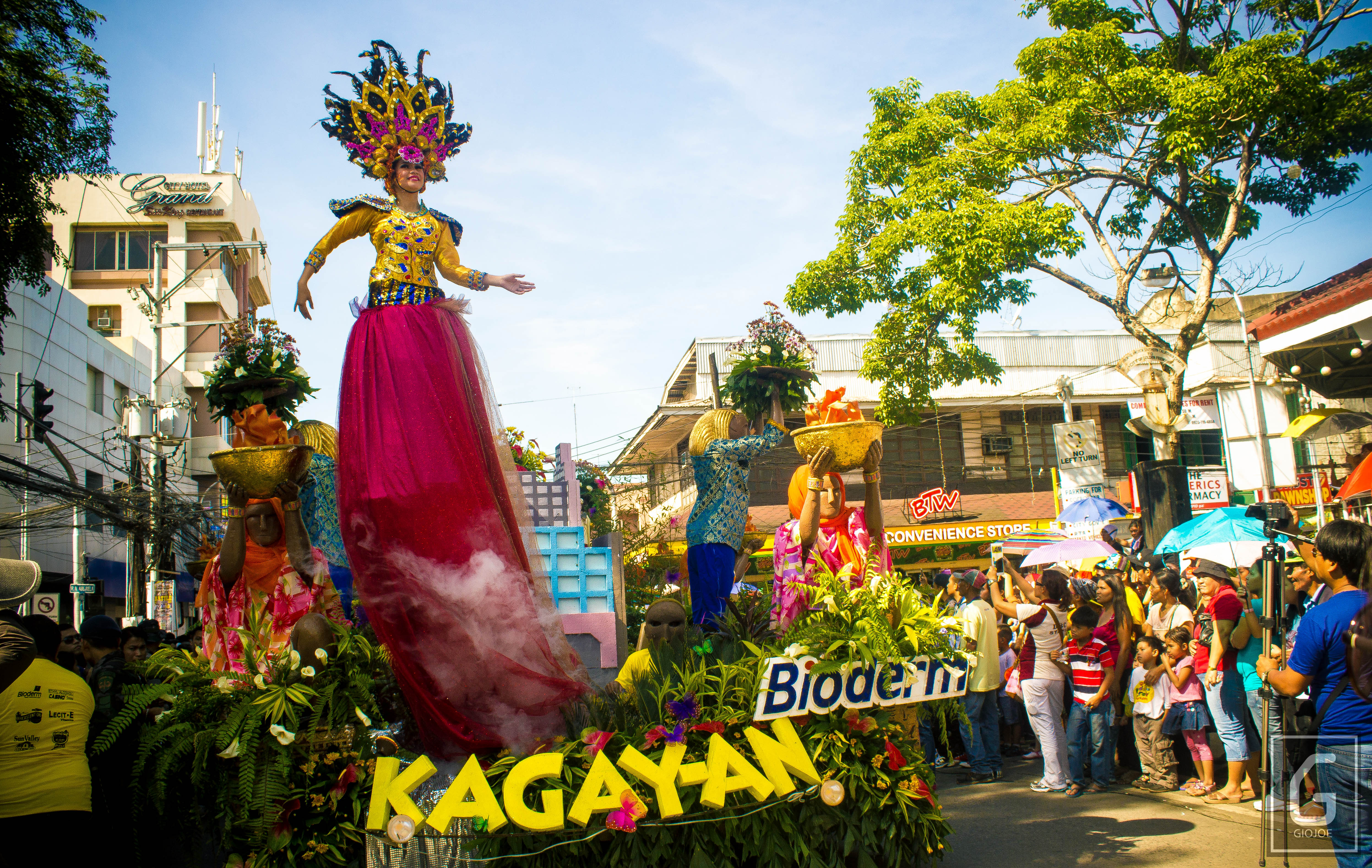
- The festival in 2014
- Observed by: Cagayan de Oro, Philippines
- Type: Christian, cultural
- Significance: feast day of St. Augustine, patron saint of the city
- Celebrations: Carnival parade, higalas parade, fluvial procession
- Date: August 28
- Next time: August 28, 2026
- Duration: 1 week
- Frequency: Annual

The Higalaay Festival (formerly known as Kagay-an Festival, then to Higalaay Kagay-an Festival in 2014) is a patronal festival held each year in Cagayan de Oro, Philippines, every 28th day of August, celebrating the feast day of St. Augustine – patron saint of the city.

== Etymology ==
Higalaay Festival means "Friendship Festival", which the word "Higalaay" comes from the Cebuano word "higala" (friend; chum; pal) which was regarded from what the city of Cagayan de Oro is being tagged, the City of Golden Friendship.

== History ==
Under father Pedro de Santa Barbara, they built the first Christian church near the fort (Gaston Park before). Coincidentally, it was finished on August 28, 1780 – the feast of St. Augustine. Since then, the inhabitants celebrate August 28 as the feast of the settlement. As years pass by, the city's festival has been changing identities as the administration changes, before, Cagayan de Oro's festival was popularly known as Kagay-an Festival and now called Higalaay Festival.

== Events ==
It has been the tradition of the city of Cagayan de Oro to celebrate its festivity with simultaneous events that even start on the first week of August. To name just some are the Garden Show and Agri Fair, Kumbira Culinary Show, Cowboy Festival: Annual Horse Show, Kahimunan Northern Mindanao: Food and Lifestyle Show, Miss Cagayan de Oro, The Kagay-an Festival Marathon, Cagayan de Oro Carnival Parade, The Higalas Parade of Floats and Icons, Higalaay Bisperas Fireworks Display, Religious Procession, Fluvial Procession, and Higalaay Pyrolympics. The highlights of the Higalaay Festival are the following:

- The Kumbira Culinary Show which is now regarded as the longest running annual culinary show and festival in the whole Philippines, is a 3-day event that encompasses live competitions such as Buffet Table Setting and Manu Folder, Noche Buena Platter, Artistic Bread Showpiece, Dessert Making, Chef Wars, Flair Bartending Tandem, and other live competitions.
- The Cagayan de Oro Carnival Parade is the city's street dancing competition where any of the barangays within the city can participate to compete for winning the Best Carnival Parade with their respective Carnival Queens.
- The Higalas Parade of Floats and Icons, usually being participated among the city's educational institutions, civic groups, fraternities and sororities, establishments and more, is being viewed by thousands of Kagay-anons and tourists that crowd the sides of the parade's route. Drum and Bugle corps, competing floats and Cagayan de Oro icons are being paraded on the event.
- The Fluvial Procession
- The Higalaay Pyrolympics that is annually hosted by SM City Cagayan de Oro gather Kagay-anons and tourists for a spectacular fireworks display.
- Mayor Rolando Uy, in 2024, launched 50 fiesta events of the festival at Rio de Oro Boulevard. The highlights include Agro Fair, Garden Show at Gaston Park and Divisoria, Kagay-an International Dragon Boat Fiesta Race at Isla de Oro, the Fiesta sa Barrio at Pelaez Sports Complex, the Kagay-an Festival Marathon at Centrio Ayala Mall, the Higalaay Pyro Musical Fireworks Competition at Rodelsa Circle, the Mindanao Fashion Summit at Centrio Ayala Mall, the Miss Cagayan de Oro at Limketkai Atrium, the DepEd Rhythmic Field Demonstration Competition, the Higalaay Street Dancing Competition, the Civic Military Parade and Float Competition at Pelaez Sports Complex and the finale, Augustine of Hippo religious and fluvial Procession.

=== Carnival Parade Winners ===
Year	Group
2014	Best Carnival Parade: 1st Place: Brgy Carmen; 2nd Place: Liceo de Cagayan University Dragon Boat Team; 3rd Place: Lapasan National High School Special Program for the Arts.; Best Carnival Queen: 1st Place: Lapasan NHS Special Program for the Arts; 2nd Place: Barangay Carmen; 3rd Place: Dancesport Council of Cagayan de Oro
2015	Best Carnival Parade: 1st Place: Macasandig National High School Performing Arts; 2nd Place: Barangay Gusa; 3rd Place: Barangay Carmen; Best Carnival Queen: 1st Place: Barangay 21; 2nd Place: Barangay Gusa; 3rd Place: Barangay Carmen

== See also ==
- Cagayan de Oro
- Misamis Oriental
- List of Philippine-related topics
