= Christian Vicente Noel =

Filipino Roman Catholic prelate

The Most Reverend Christian Vicente Fernandez Noel D.D.
- Bishop Emeritus of Talibon
- Archdiocese: Cebu
- Diocese: Talibon
- Appointed: September 6, 1986
- Installed: December 3, 1986
- Retired: June 3, 2014
- Predecessor: Inaugural holder
- Successor: Patrick Daniel Y. Parcon
- Other post: Auxiliary Bishop of Cagayan de Oro (1981–1986)

Orders
- Ordination: March 19, 1961 by Julio Rosales
- Consecration: November 30, 1981 by Julio Rosales

Personal details
- Born: Christian Vicente Fernandez Noel; November 17, 1937 Sangi, Asturias, Cebu, Commonwealth of the Philippines
- Died: November 26, 2017 (aged 80) Perpetual Succour Hospital, Cebu City, Philippines
- Denomination: Roman Catholic
- Motto: Timete Deum ("Fear God")
- Coat of arms

Christian Vicente Fernandez Noel (November 17, 1937 – November 26, 2017) was a Filipino Roman Catholic prelate.

Born in Asturias, Cebu, Noel was ordained to the priesthood in 1961. He served as the Bishop of Talibon from 1986 until his retirement in 2014. He died on November 26, 2017, in Cebu City, nine days after his 80th birthday.
