= Carmelo Morelos =

Filipino Catholic archbishop

Carmelo Dominador F. Morelos
- Archbishop of Zamboanga
- Province: Zamboanga
- See: Archdiocese of Zamboanga
- Installed: 1994
- Term ended: 2006
- Predecessor: Francisco Raval Cruces
- Successor: Romulo Valles
- Previous posts: Bishop of Butuan (1967–1994)

Orders
- Ordination: April 3, 1954
- Consecration: July 5, 1967 by Archbishop Teopisto Alberto

Personal details
- Born: Carmelo Dominador Flores Morelos; December 12, 1930
- Died: September 17, 2016 (aged 85)
- Buried: Metropolitan Cathedral of the Immaculate Conception, Zamboanga City
- Denomination: Catholic
- Motto: "Por Cristo, Con El Y En El"
- Coat of arms

Carmelo Dominador Flores Morelos (December 12, 1930 – September 17, 2016) was a Filipino Catholic archbishop.

Ordained to the priesthood in 1954, Morelos was appointed as the first Bishop of Butuan in 1967 serving the diocese until 1994 when he transferred to the Archdiocese of Zamboanga. He served as the archdiocese's bishop until his retirement in 2006.

Morelos also served at the Catholic Bishops' Conference of the Philippines as its president from 1991 to 1995 and was named the chairman of the Mindanao-Sulu Pastoral Conference twice. He was also one of the reported candidates to succeed then retiring Archbishop of Manila Jaime Sin who was then set to vacate his post in August 2003.

He died of age-related illness on September 17, 2016.
