= Siervas de Nuestra Señora de la Paz =

The Siervas de la Nuestra Senora de la Paz, known as the SNSP Sisters is a religious congregation of sisters of Diocesan Right founded in Cebu by a layman named Exequiel Barangan in 1935. Its foundation began in Anislagan, Guadalupe, Carcar, Cebu Inspired by the Holy Spirit, Brother Exequiel started to invite women to form a community of lay women to serve the Church and its people.

== Background ==
Grounded on its vision of -"A religious community united and inspired by the spirit of the Blessed Virgin Mary, handmaid of the Lord, serving the people who are poor and in need of the love and peace of Christ for the Salvation of all and the Glory of God"- the sisters are gradually growing as is now numbering to about a hundred scattered all over the Philippines.

They are helping the bishops on diocesan works, health ministry and visiting the sick.
