= Diocese of Talibon =

Roman Catholic diocese in the Philippines

Diocese of Talibon Dioecesis Talibonensis Diyosesis sa Talibon

Catholic
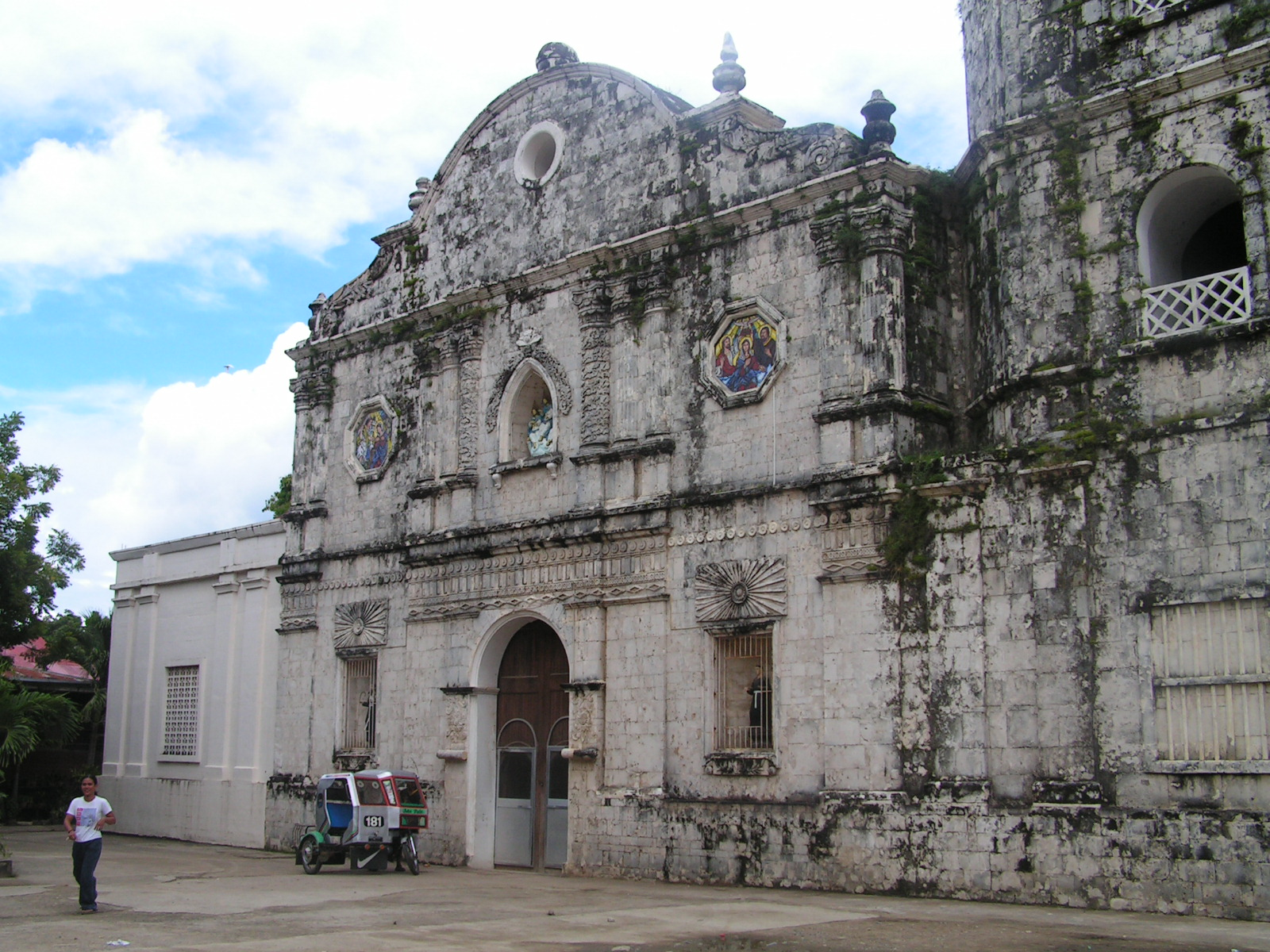
- The Blessed Trinity Cathedral in Talibon

- Coat of arms

Location
- Country: Philippines
- Territory: Eastern Bohol (Alicia, Anda, Bien Unido, Buenavista, Candijay, Carmen, Dagohoy, Danao, Duero, Getafe, Guindulman, Inabanga, Jagna, Mabini, Pilar, President Carlos P. Garcia, San Miguel, Sierra Bullones, Talibon, Trinidad, Ubay)
- Ecclesiastical province: Cebu
- Metropolitan: Cebu
- Deaneries: 7
- Coordinates: 10°09′04″N 124°19′34″E

Statistics
- Area: 2,243 km^{2} (866 sq mi)
- Population: Total; Catholics: (as of 2021); 762,643; 635,144 (83.3%)
- Parishes: 48

Information
- Denomination: Catholic
- Sui iuris church: Latin Church
- Rite: Roman Rite
- Established: January 9, 1986
- Cathedral: Blessed Trinity Cathedral
- Patron: Holy Trinity
- Secular priests: 89

Current leadership
- Pope: Leo XIV
- Bishop: Patrick Daniel Y. Parcon
- Metropolitan Archbishop: Alberto Uy
- Vicar General: Msgr. Ignacio H. Reyes
- Episcopal Vicars: Msgr. Jonathan D. Pacudan; Msgr. Bernard Rañoa; Msgr. Ariel Lantaca

The Diocese of Talibon is a Latin Church ecclesiastical territory or diocese of the Catholic Church in the Philippines, headquartered in Talibon, Bohol. It is one of two dioceses in the province of Bohol, the other being the Diocese of Tagbilaran. Both dioceses are suffragan to the Archdiocese of Cebu.

== History ==
The Diocese is one of two dioceses in the province of Bohol and part of the ecclesiastical province of the Archdiocese of Cebu. It was created on January 9, 1986, separating half the civil province of Bohol from the Diocese of Tagbilaran. then Pope John Paul II appointed Auxiliary Bishop Christian Vicente Noel as the First Bishop of Talibon, the Diocese comprises the northeastern municipalities of Bohol, consisting of coastal municipalities starting from Inabanga in the northwest to Jagna in the southeast and interior municipalities bounded by Carmen and Sierra Bullones. There are 7 vicariates in the diocese comprising 37 parishes and ministered to by 101 priests. There are also 53 religious sisters active in the running of 16 secondary Catholic schools.

== Bishops ==
Bishop		Period in office	Notes	Coat of Arms
1.	Christian Vicente Fernandez Noel	December 3, 1986 – June 3, 2014 (27 years, 182 days)	Retired from office	
2.	Patrick Daniel Yee Parcon	August 26, 2014 – present (11 years, 35 days)		

== See also ==
- Diocese of Tagbilaran
- Archdiocese of Cebu
- List of the Roman Catholic dioceses of the Philippines
