= Jose Cabantan =

Filipino prelate of the Catholic Church (born 1957)

His Excellency, The Most Reverend José A. Cabantan D.D.
- Metropolitan Archbishop of Cagayan de Oro
- Church: Catholic Church; Latin Church
- Archdiocese: Cagayan de Oro
- Appointed: June 23, 2020
- Installed: August 28, 2020
- Predecessor: Antonio Ledesma
- Successor: Incumbent
- Previous post: Bishop of Malaybalay (2010‍–‍2020)

Orders
- Ordination: April 30, 1990 by Patrick Henry Cronin
- Consecration: April 30, 2010 by Edward Joseph Adams

Personal details
- Born: José Araneta Cabantan; June 19, 1957 (age 69) Lagonglong, Misamis Oriental, Philippines
- Education: Cebu Institute of Technology; St. John Vianney Theological Seminary; Loyola School of Theology
- Motto: Spe Salvi Sumus (Latin for 'In hope we were saved')
- Coat of arms: José A. Cabantan's coat of arms

Ordination history
History
Priestly ordination
- Ordained by: Patrick Henry Cronin
Episcopal consecration
- Principal consecrator: Edward Joseph Adams
- Co-consecrators: Antonio Ledesma, Honesto Pacana
Episcopal succession
Bishops consecrated by Jose Cabantan as principal consecrator
- Noel Portal Pedregosa: September 14, 2021
- Source(s): Misyon Oline; Catholic-Hierarchy.org

Styles of José A. Cabantan
- Reference style: His Excellency; The Most Reverend
- Spoken style: Your Excellency
- Religious style: Archbishop

José Araneta Cabantan (born June 19, 1957) is a Filipino prelate of the Catholic Church, serving as the archbishop of the Latin Church Metropolitan Archdiocese of Cagayan de Oro in the Philippines.

== Early life ==
José Araneta Cabantan was born in Lagonglong, Misamis Oriental, on June 19, 1957. He completed his secondary education at Saint John the Baptist High School in Lagonglong. He subsequently received his bachelor's degree in chemical engineering from the Cebu Institute of Technology in Cebu City, his master's degree in pastoral ministry from St. John Vianney Theological seminary in Cagayan de Oro, and his Licentiate in sacred theology from the Loyola School of Theology in Manila.

He was ordained a priest on April 30, 1990, in Lagonglong for the Metropolitan Archdiocese of Cagayan de Oro.

After a year as associate pastor at the cathedral, he was, from 1991 to 1995, administrator of the San Roque parish of Catarman, Camaguin. From 1995 to 1997 he was dean of studies at the San Jose de Mindanao Seminary in Cagayan de Oro. After three years of study at the Loyola School of Theology and one year as director of the San Jose Seminary in Quezon City, he was, from 2000 to 2007, formator at the St. John Vianney Theological Seminary in Cagayan de Oro. From 2007 to 2010 he was pastor of the Medalla Milagrosa parish in Cagayan de Oro.

== Episcopacy ==
Cabantan was appointed Bishop of Malaybalay on February 18, 2010 where the retirement of his predecessor Honesto Pacana, S.J. was approved effective the former's installation on May 15, 2010, and consecrated on April 30 by Edward Joseph Adams, then Apostolic Nuncio to the Philippines.

Within the Episcopal Conference of the Philippines, Bishop Cabantan served as president of the Episcopal Commission for Basic Communities.

On June 23, 2020, Pope Francis appointed Cabantan as the fifth Archbishop of the Metropolitan Archdiocese of Cagayan de Oro after the retirement of his predecessor Archbishop Antonio Ledesma and was canonically installed on August 28, 2020 by Orlando Cardinal Quevedo, Archbishop-emeritus of Cotabato. He also received the pallium — the symbol of his authority as metropolitan archbishop — during his installation ceremony.

=== Coat of arms ===
Coat of arms as Bishop of Malaybalay

Catholic Church titles
Preceded by Antonio Ledesma	Archbishop of Cagayan de Oro; August 28, 2020 – present	Incumbent
Preceded by Honesto Pacana	Bishop of Malaybalay; May 15, 2010 – August 28, 2020	Succeeded by Noel Pedregosa
