= List of cathedrals in the Philippines =

This is a list of cathedrals in the Philippines sorted by denomination.

== Catholic Church ==
The Catholic Church in the Philippines is organized into 72 dioceses in 16 ecclesiastical provinces, as well as seven apostolic vicariates and a military ordinariate. These are the following Catholic cathedrals in the Philippines:

Cathedral	Dedication	Diocese	Image
=== Archdiocese of Cáceres ===
Most Holy Trinity Cathedral	Holy Trinity	Diocese of Daet	
Saint Gregory the Great Cathedral Parish	Saint Gregory the Great	Diocese of Legazpi	
Libmanan Cathedral	Saint James the Apostle	Diocese of Libmanan	
St. Anthony of Padua Cathedral	Saint Anthony of Padua	Diocese of Masbate	
Naga Cathedral	Saint John the Evangelist	Archdiocese of Cáceres	
Sorsogon Cathedral	Saints Peter and Paul	Diocese of Sorsogon	
Virac Cathedral	Immaculate Conception	Diocese of Virac	
=== Archdiocese of Cagayan de Oro ===
Cathedral of St. Joseph the Worker	Saint Joseph	Diocese of Butuan	
Cathedral of St. Michael the Archangel	Saint Michael the Archangel	Diocese of Prosperidad	
Saint Augustine Metropolitan Cathedral	Saint Augustine of Hippo	Archdiocese of Cagayan de Oro	
Malaybalay Cathedral	Saint Isidore the Laborer	Diocese of Malaybalay	
Surigao Cathedral	Saint Nicholas of Tolentino	Diocese of Surigao	
Tandag Cathedral	Saint Nicholas of Tolentino	Diocese of Tandag	
=== Archdiocese of Capiz ===
Kalibo Cathedral	Saint John the Baptist	Diocese of Kalibo	
Romblon Cathedral	Saint Joseph	Diocese of Romblon	
Roxas Cathedral	Immaculate Conception	Archdiocese of Capiz	
=== Archdiocese of Cebu ===
Cebu Metropolitan Cathedral	Saint Vitalis	Archdiocese of Cebu	
Dumaguete Cathedral	Saint Catherine of Alexandria	Diocese of Dumaguete	
Maasin Cathedral	Our Lady of Assumption	Diocese of Maasin	
Tagbilaran Cathedral	Saint Joseph the Worker	Diocese of Tagbilaran	
Talibon Cathedral	Blessed Trinity	Diocese of Talibon	
=== Archdiocese of Cotabato ===
Cotabato Cathedral	Immaculate Conception	Archdiocese of Cotabato	
Koronadal Cathedral	Christ the King	Diocese of Marbel	
Kidapawan Cathedral	Our Lady Mediatrix of All Graces	Diocese of Kidapawan	
=== Archdiocese of Davao ===
San Pedro Cathedral	Saint Peter	Archdiocese of Davao	
Digos Cathedral	Our Lady Mediatrix of All Graces	Diocese of Digos	
Mati Cathedral	Saint Nicholas of Tolentino	Diocese of Mati	
Tagum Cathedral	Christ the King	Diocese of Tagum	
=== Archdiocese of Jaro ===
Bacolod Cathedral	Saint Sebastian	Diocese of Bacolod	
Jaro Cathedral	Our Lady of the Candles and Saint Elizabeth of Hungary	Archdiocese of Jaro	
Kabankalan Cathedral	Saint Francis Xavier	Diocese of Kabankalan	
San Carlos Cathedral	Saint Charles Borromeo	Diocese of San Carlos	
Silay Cathedral	Saint Didacus of Alcalá	Diocese of Bacolod	
San Jose de Antique Cathedral	Saint Joseph the Worker	Diocese of San Jose de Antique	
=== Archdiocese of Lingayen-Dagupan ===
Alaminos Cathedral	Saint Joseph the Patriarch	Diocese of Alaminos	
Cabanatuan Cathedral	Saint Nicholas of Tolentino	Diocese of Cabanatuan	
Dagupan Cathedral	Saint John the Evangelist	Archdiocese of Lingayen-Dagupan	
Lingayen Cathedral	Three Kings	Archdiocese of Lingayen-Dagupan	
Old Dagupan Cathedral	Saint John the Evangelist	Archdiocese of Lingayen-Dagupan	
San Fernando Cathedral	Saint William of Maleval	Diocese of San Fernando de La Union	
San Jose Cathedral	Saint Joseph the Worker	Diocese of San Jose de Nueva Ecija	
Urdaneta Cathedral	Immaculate Conception	Diocese of Urdaneta	
=== Archdiocese of Lipa ===
Boac Cathedral	Immaculate Conception	Diocese of Boac	
Gumaca Cathedral	Saint Didacus of Alcalá	Diocese of Gumaca	
Infanta Cathedral	Infant Jesus of Prague and Saint Mark the Evangelist	Territorial Prelature of Infanta	
Lipa Cathedral	Saint Sebastian	Archdiocese of Lipa	
Lucena Cathedral	Saint Ferdinand	Diocese of Lucena	
=== Archdiocese of Manila ===
Antipolo Cathedral	Immaculate Conception	Diocese of Antipolo	
Caloocan Cathedral	Saint Roch	Diocese of Kalookan	
Cubao Cathedral	Immaculate Conception	Diocese of Cubao	
Imus Cathedral	Our Lady of the Pillar	Diocese of Imus	
Malolos Cathedral	Immaculate Conception	Diocese of Malolos	
Manila Cathedral	Immaculate Conception	Archdiocese of Manila	
Novaliches Cathedral	Good Shepherd	Diocese of Novaliches	
Parañaque Cathedral	Saint Andrew	Diocese of Parañaque	
Pasig Cathedral	Immaculate Conception	Diocese of Pasig	
San Pablo Cathedral	Saint Paul of Thebes	Diocese of San Pablo	
=== Archdiocese of Nueva Segovia ===
Baguio Cathedral	Our Lady of the Atonement	Diocese of Baguio	
Bangued Cathedral	Saint James the Great	Diocese of Bangued	
Laoag Cathedral	Saint William of Maleval	Diocese of Laoag	
Vigan Cathedral	Saint Paul the Apostle	Archdiocese of Nueva Segovia	
=== Archdiocese of Ozamis ===
Dipolog Cathedral	Our Lady of the Holy Rosary	Diocese of Dipolog	
Iligan Cathedral	Saint Michael the Archangel	Diocese of Iligan	
Marawi Cathedral	Mary, Help of Christians	Territorial Prelature of Marawi	
Ozamiz Cathedral	Immaculate Conception	Archdiocese of Ozamis	
Pagadian Cathedral	Santo Niño	Diocese of Pagadian	
=== Archdiocese of Palo ===
Borongan Cathedral	Nativity of Mary	Diocese of Borongan	
Calbayog Cathedral	Saints Peter and Paul	Diocese of Calbayog	
Catarman Cathedral	Our Lady of Annunciation	Diocese of Catarman	
Palo Cathedral	Transfiguration of Our Lord	Archdiocese of Palo	
Naval Cathedral	Our Lady of the Most Holy Rosary	Diocese of Naval	
=== Archdiocese of San Fernando ===
Balanga Cathedral	Saint Joseph	Diocese of Balanga	
Iba Cathedral	Saint Augustine	Diocese of Iba	
San Fernando Cathedral	Saint Ferdinand	Archdiocese of San Fernando	
Tarlac Cathedral	Saint Sebastian	Diocese of Tarlac	
=== Archdiocese of Tuguegarao ===
Basco Cathedral	Immaculate Conception	Territorial Prelature of Batanes	
Bayombong Cathedral	Saint Dominic	Diocese of Bayombong	
Gamu Cathedral	Saint Michael the Archangel	Diocese of Ilagan	
Ilagan Cathedral	Saint Ferdinand	Diocese of Ilagan	
Tuguegarao Cathedral	Saint Peter	Archdiocese of Tuguegarao	
=== Archdiocese of Zamboanga ===
Ipil Cathedral	Saint Joseph the Worker	Diocese of Ipil	
Isabela Cathedral	Saint Elizabeth of Portugal	Territorial Prelature of Isabela	
Zamboanga Cathedral	Immaculate Conception	Archdiocese of Zamboanga	
=== Apostolic Vicariates ===
Bontoc Cathedral	Saint Rita of Cascia	Apostolic Vicariate of Bontoc-Lagawe	
Calapan Cathedral	Santo Niño	Apostolic Vicariate of Calapan	
Jolo Cathedral	Our Lady of Mount Carmel	Apostolic Vicariate of Jolo	
Puerto Princesa Cathedral	Immaculate Conception	Apostolic Vicariate of Puerto Princesa	
San Jose Cathedral	Saint Joseph the Worker	Apostolic Vicariate of San Jose in Mindoro	
Tabuk Cathedral	Saint William of Maleval	Apostolic Vicariate of Tabuk	
Taytay Cathedral	Saint Joseph the Worker	Apostolic Vicariate of Taytay	

== Philippine Independent Church ==
Below is a list of cathedrals of the Philippine Independent Church (Iglesia Filipina Independiente), also known as the Aglipayan Church, an Independent Catholic denomination with Anglo-Catholic orientation:

=== Under the Supreme Bishop ===
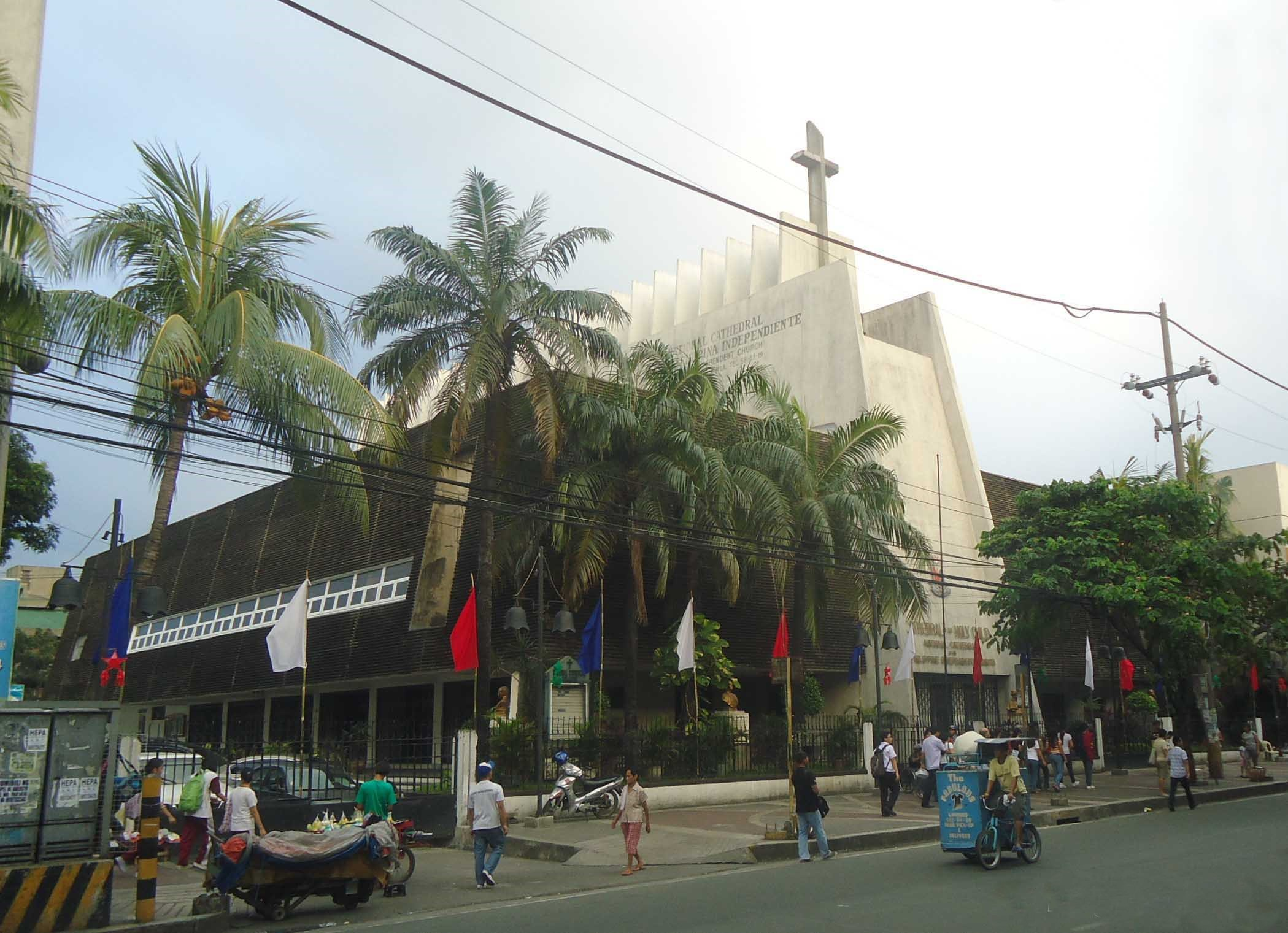
National Cathedral of the Holy Child in Ermita, Manila

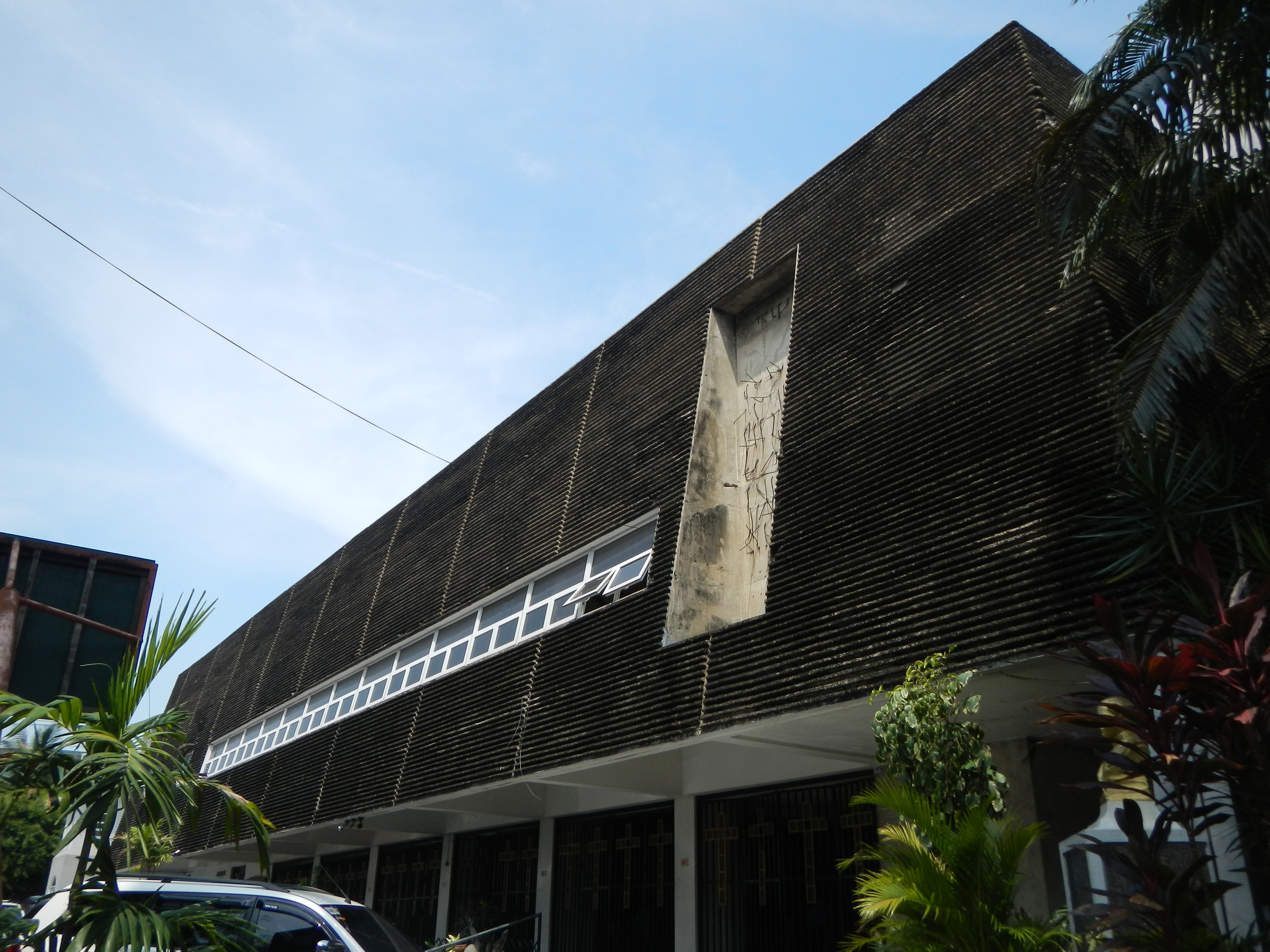
National Cathedral of the Holy Child in Ermita, Manila

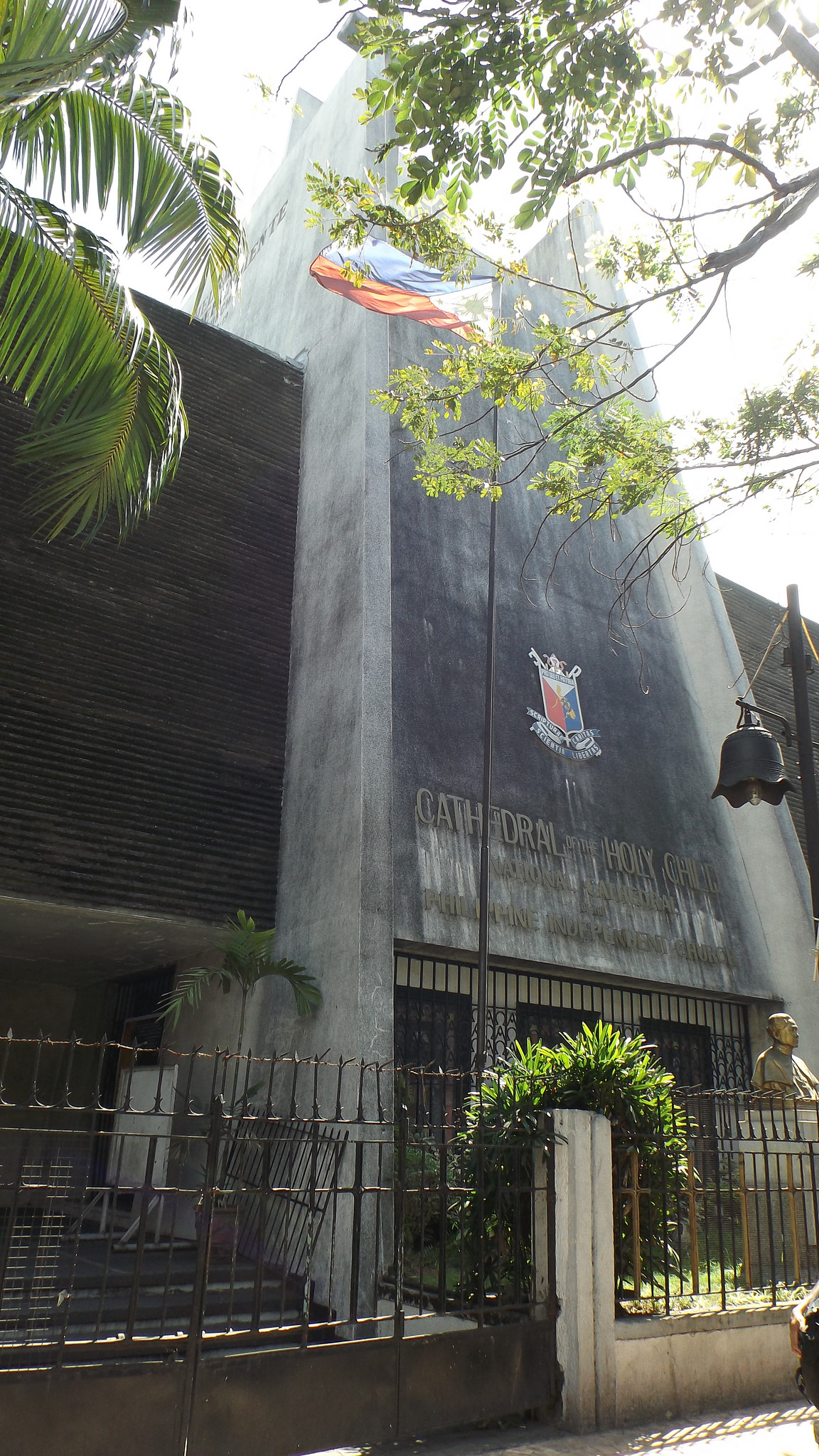
National Cathedral of the Holy Child in Ermita, Manila

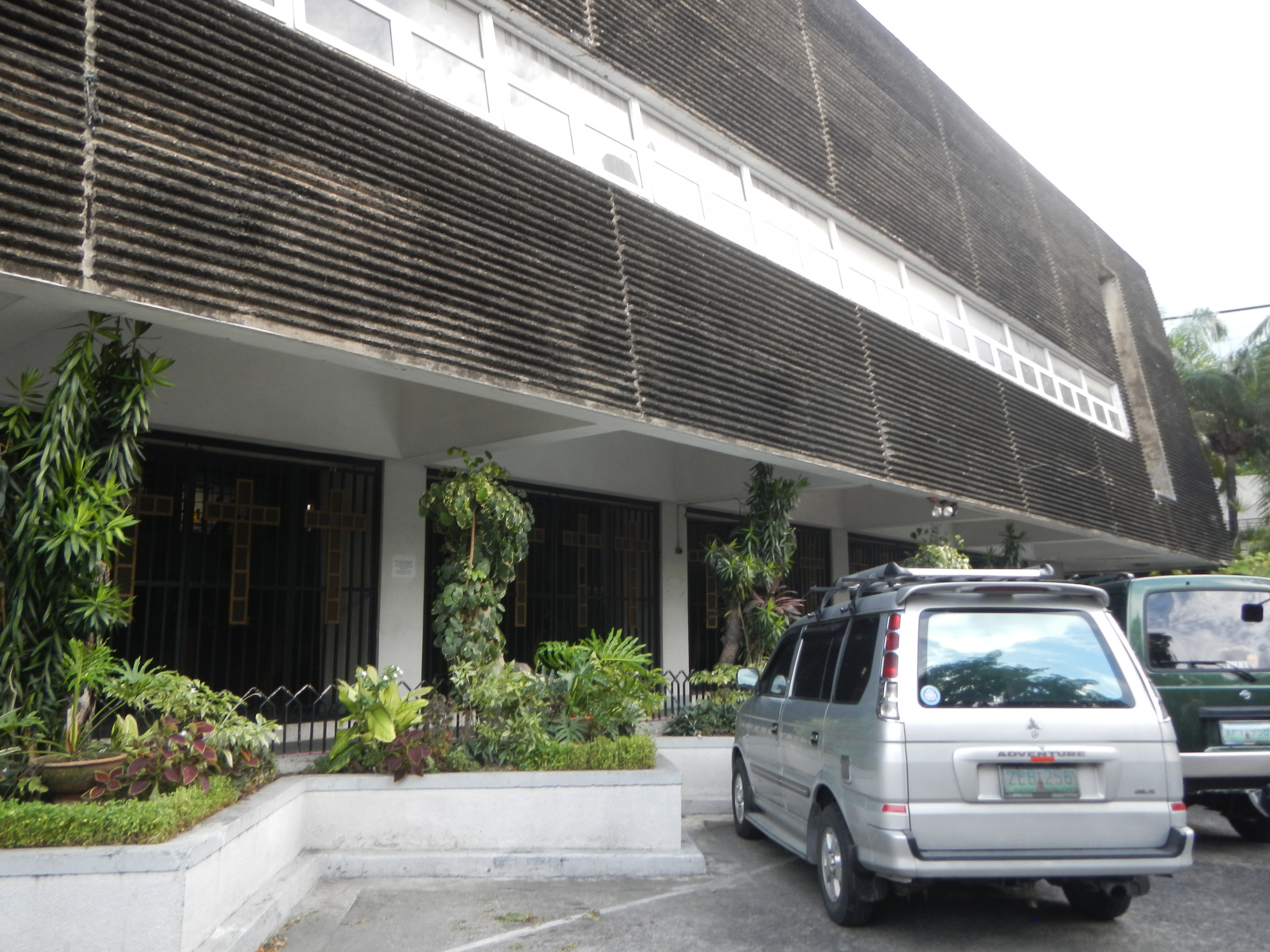
National Cathedral of the Holy Child in Ermita, Manila
- National Cathedral of the Holy Child in Ermita, Manila

=== North-Central Luzon Bishops' Conference ===
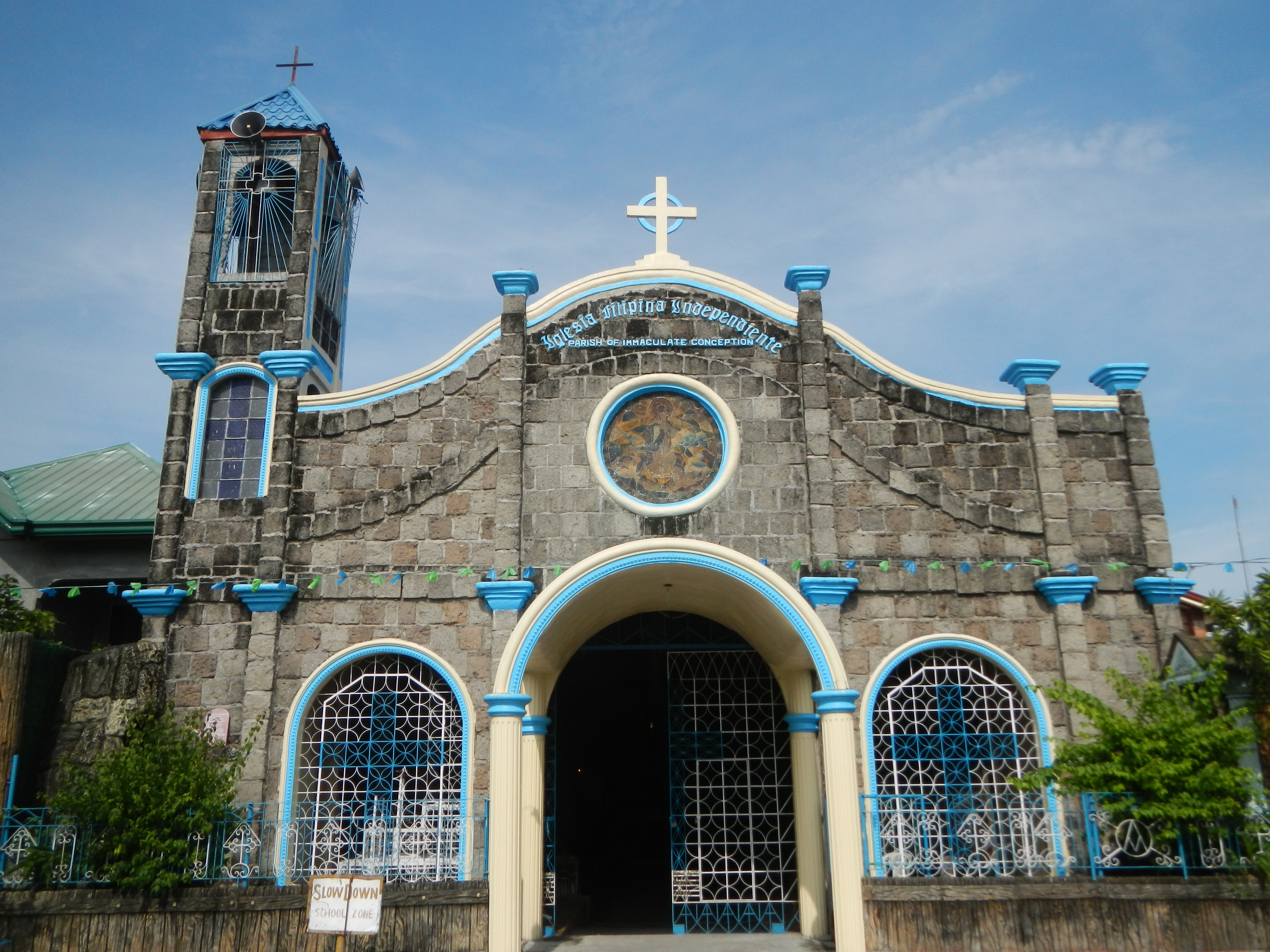
Cathedral of the Immaculate Conception in Victoria, Tarlac

Cathedral of St. William the Hermit in Laoag City, Ilocos Norte

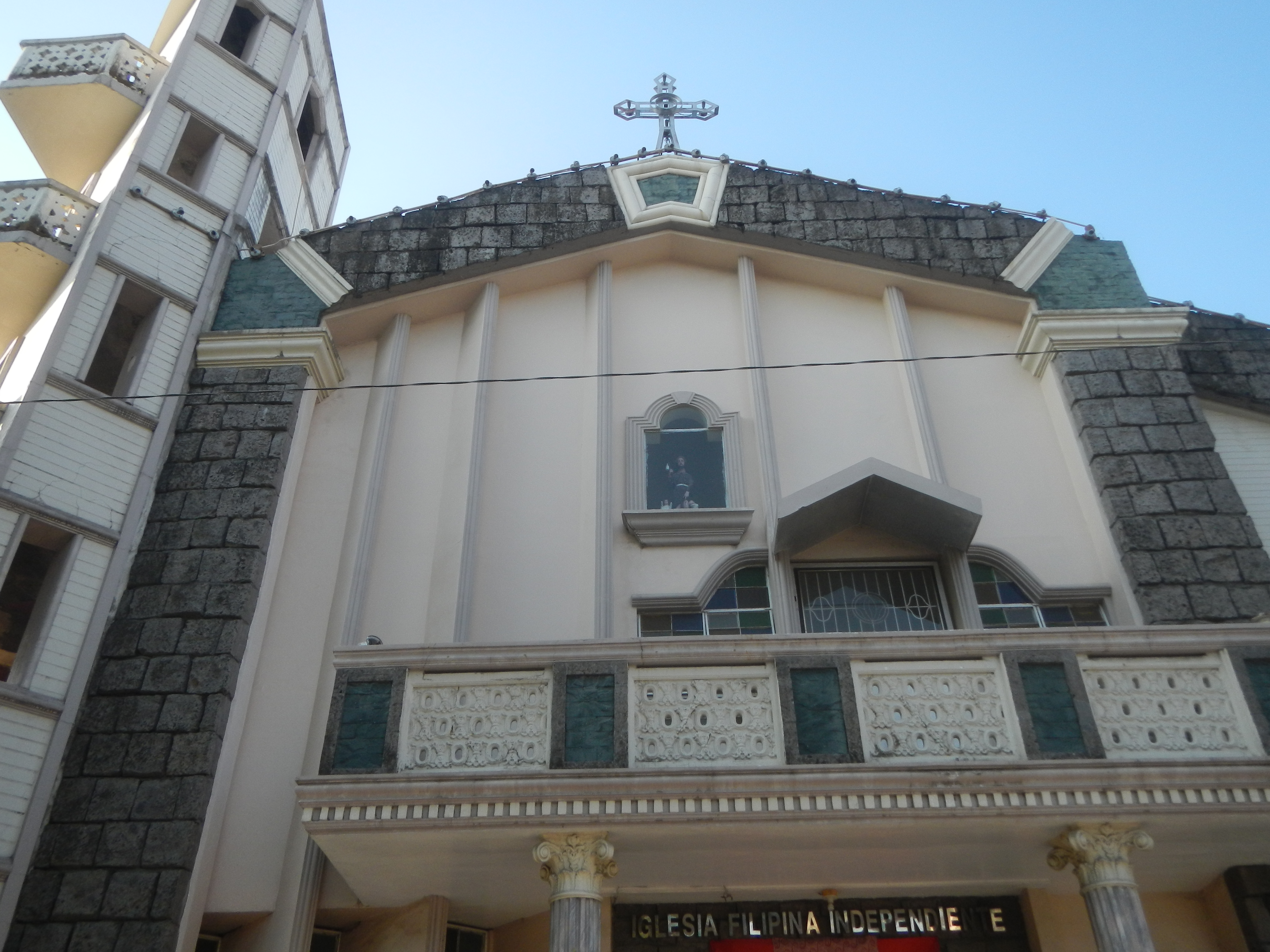
Cathedral Church of San Roque in San Felipe, Zambales

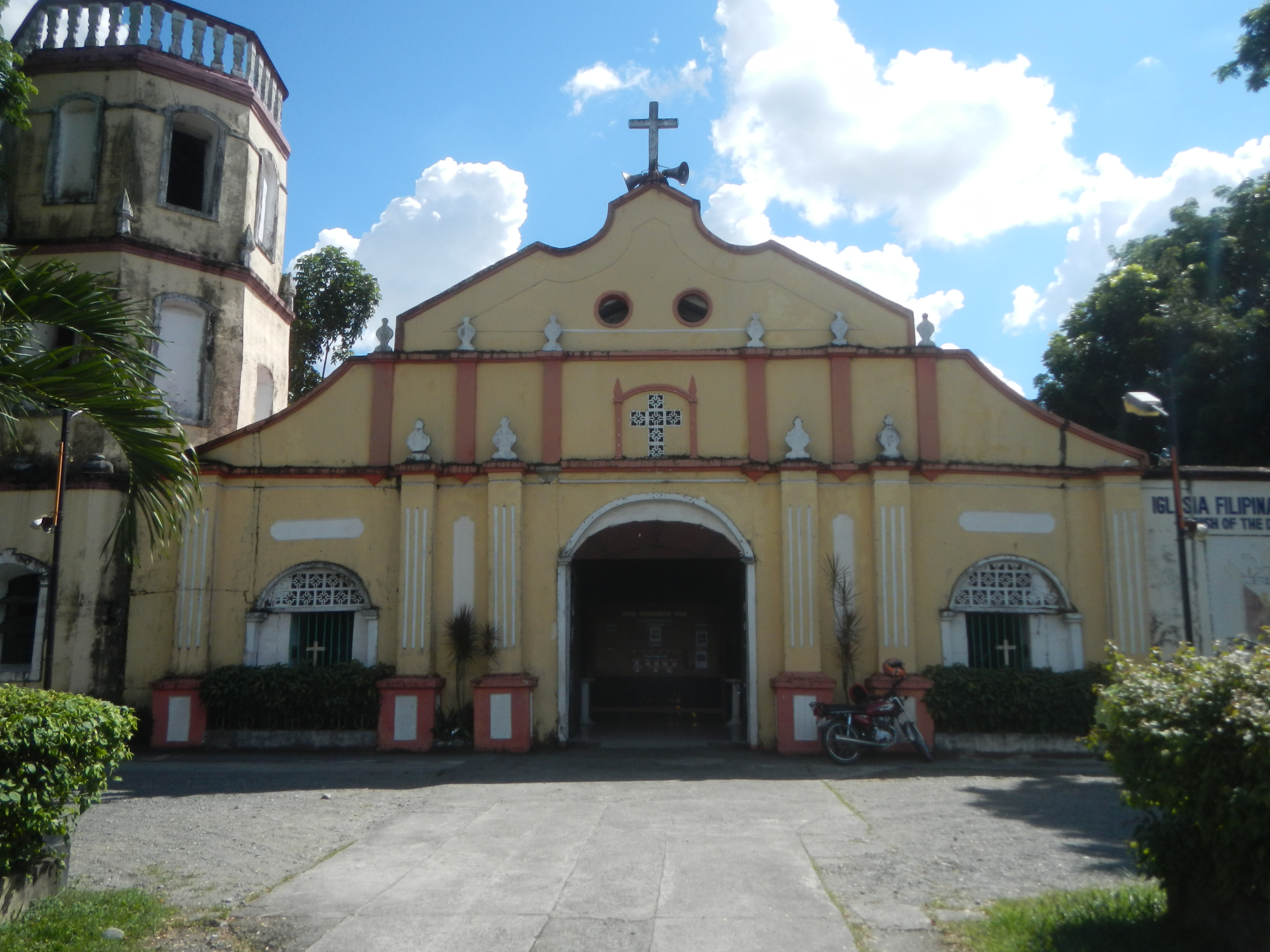
Parish Church of the Divine Shepherd in Aglipay Central Theological Seminary (ACTS), Urdaneta City, Pangasinan
- Cathedral of St. William the Hermit in Laoag
- Cathedral of Saint Mary, Aglipay National Shrine in Batac
- Pro-Cathedral of St. William in Ballesteros, Cagayan
- Pro-Cathedral of St. Joseph, SBVM in Lingayen
- Cathedral of the Immaculate Conception in Victoria, Tarlac
- Cathedral of St. Anthony of Padua in Rosales, Pangasinan
- Cathedral of St. Jerome in Santo Domingo, Nueva Ecija
- Cathedral Church of San Roque (St. Roche) in San Felipe, Zambales
- Cathedral of St. Stephen in San Esteban, Ilocos Sur
- Cathedral of St. Louis Beltran in Solano, Nueva Vizcaya
- Cathedral of St. James the Greater in Santiago, Isabela
- Cathedral of St. Joseph the Worker in Delfin Albano
- Pro-Cathedral Parish of St. Augustine of Hippo in Paoay

=== South-Central Luzon Bishops' Conference ===
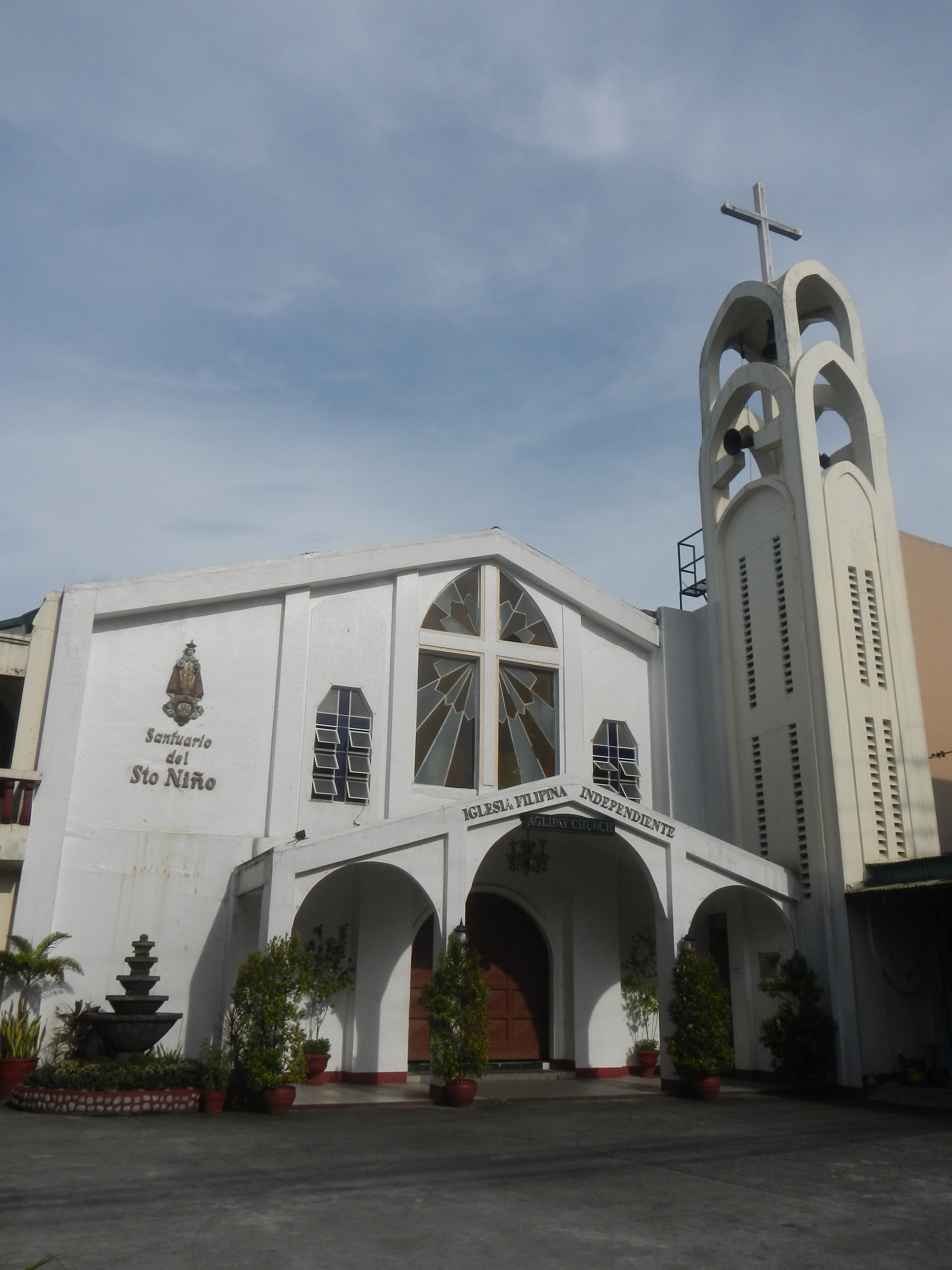
Cathedral of the Holy Child in Mandaluyong City

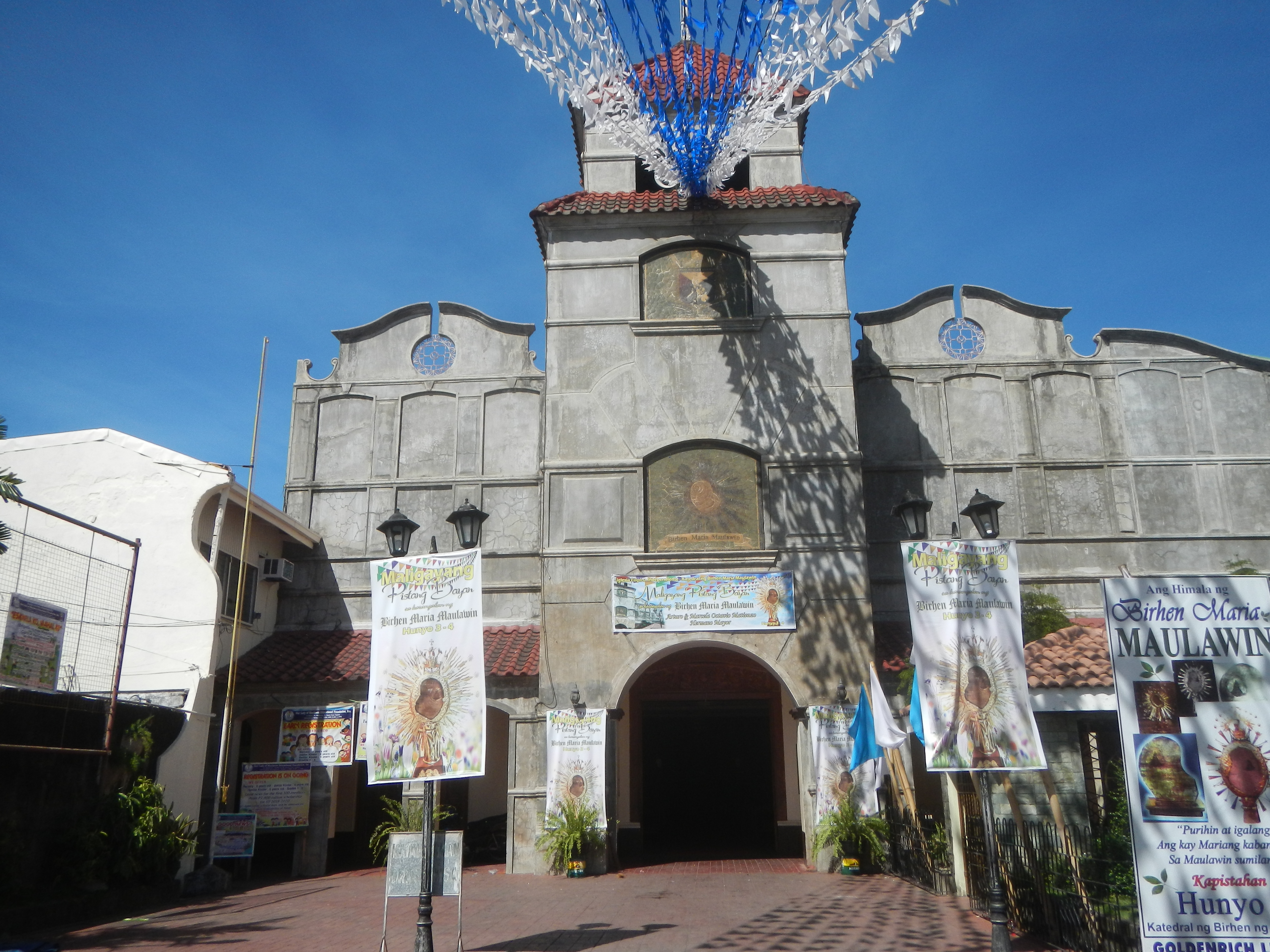
Cathedral of Our Lady of Maulawin in A. Mabini St., Santa Cruz, Laguna

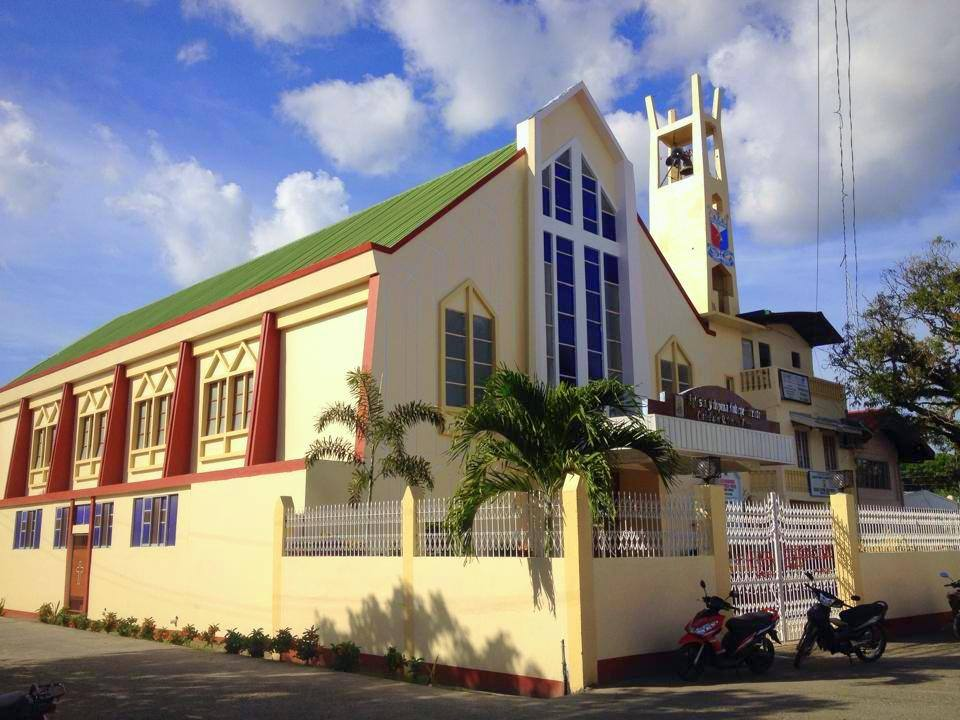
Cathedral of St. Vincent Ferrer in J.P. Rizal St., Tabing Dagat (Poblacion), Odiongan, Romblon

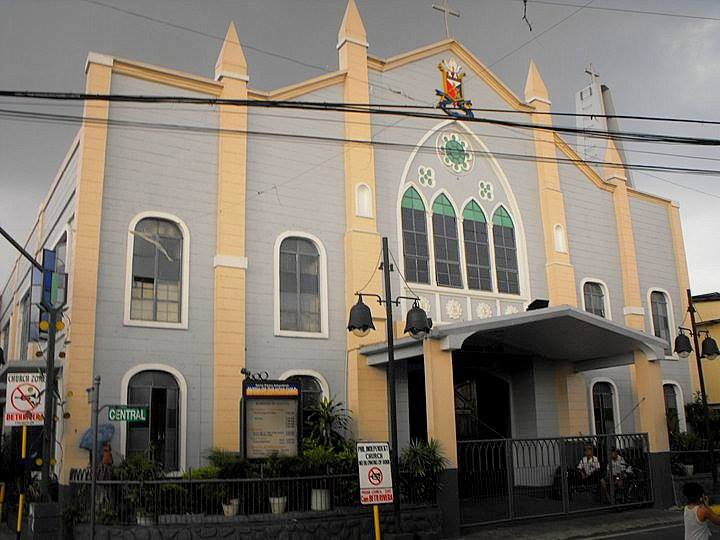
Cathedral Parish of the Holy Child in Pandacan, Manila

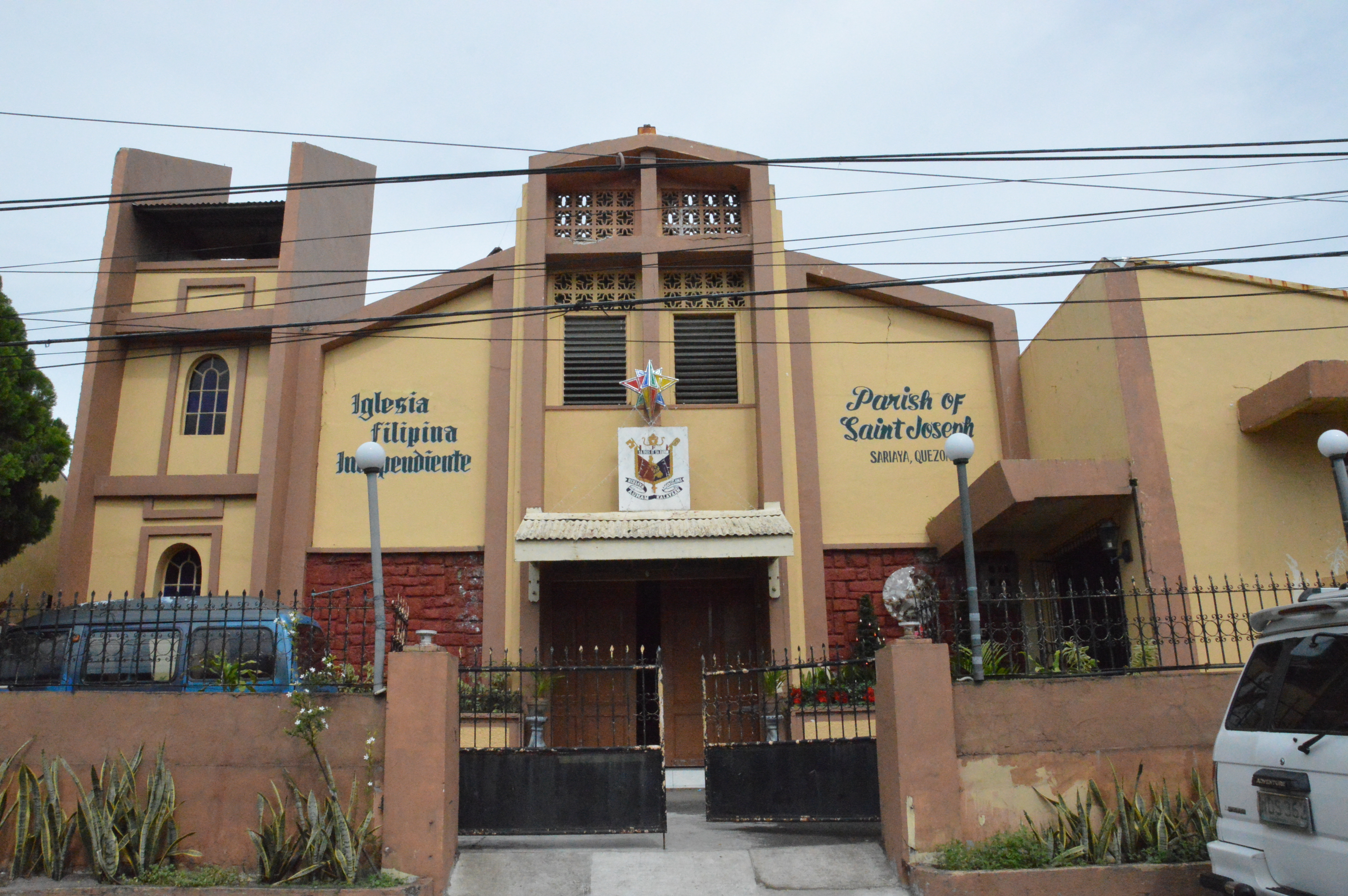
Pro-Cathedral Parish of St. Joseph in Sariaya, Quezon
- Cathedral of the Conception of Mary in Malolos
- Cathedral of the Holy Child (Sto. Niño) in Mandaluyong
- Cathedral of the Crucified Lord in Quezon City
- Cathedral of St. Michael and All Archangels in Bacoor
- Cathedral of Our Lady of Maulawin in Santa Cruz, Laguna
- Cathedral of St. Vincent Ferrer in Odiongan, Romblon
- Cathedral of Our Lady of Remedies in Placer, Masbate
- Pro-Cathedral of Sts. Peter and Paul in Puerto Princesa
- Pro-Cathedral of St. Joseph in Gasan, Marinduque
- Pro-Cathedral Parish of St. Joseph in Sariaya
- Pro-Cathedral of St. Philip and St. James in Lagonoy
- Pro-Cathedral Parish of the Holy Child in Roxas, Oriental Mindoro
- Cathedral Parish of the Holy Child (Sto. Niño) in Pandacan, Manila

=== Visayas Bishops' Conference ===
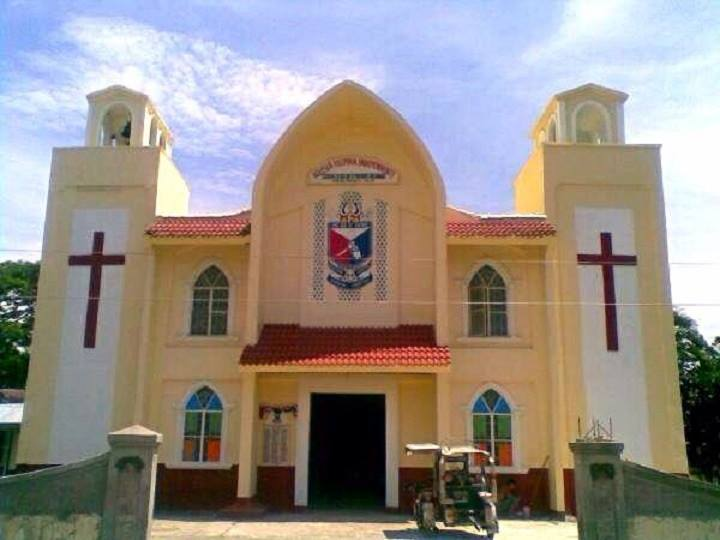
Cathedral of Our Lady of Providence and Guidance in Albasan, Numancia, Aklan

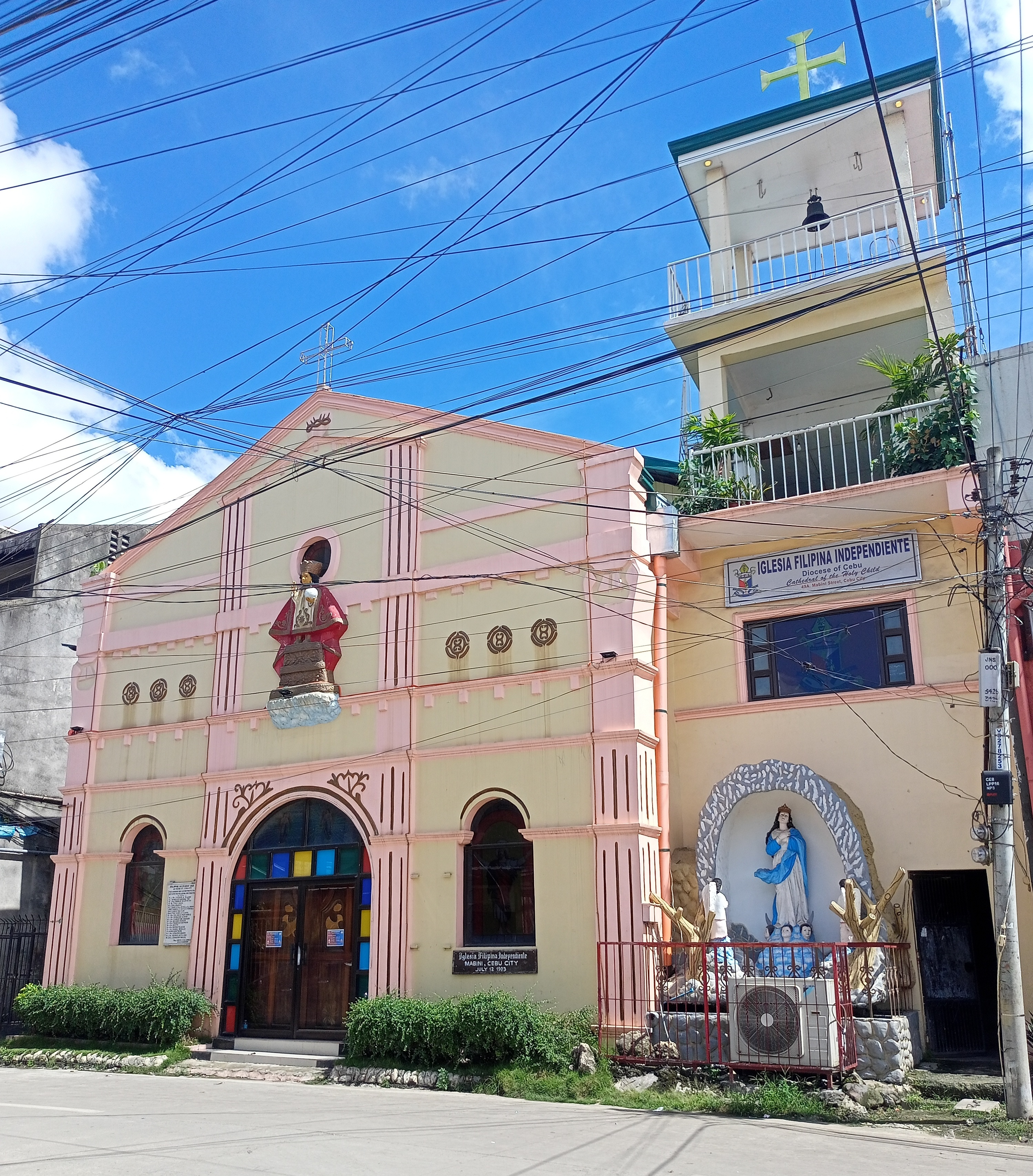
Cathedral of the Holy Child in Cebu City

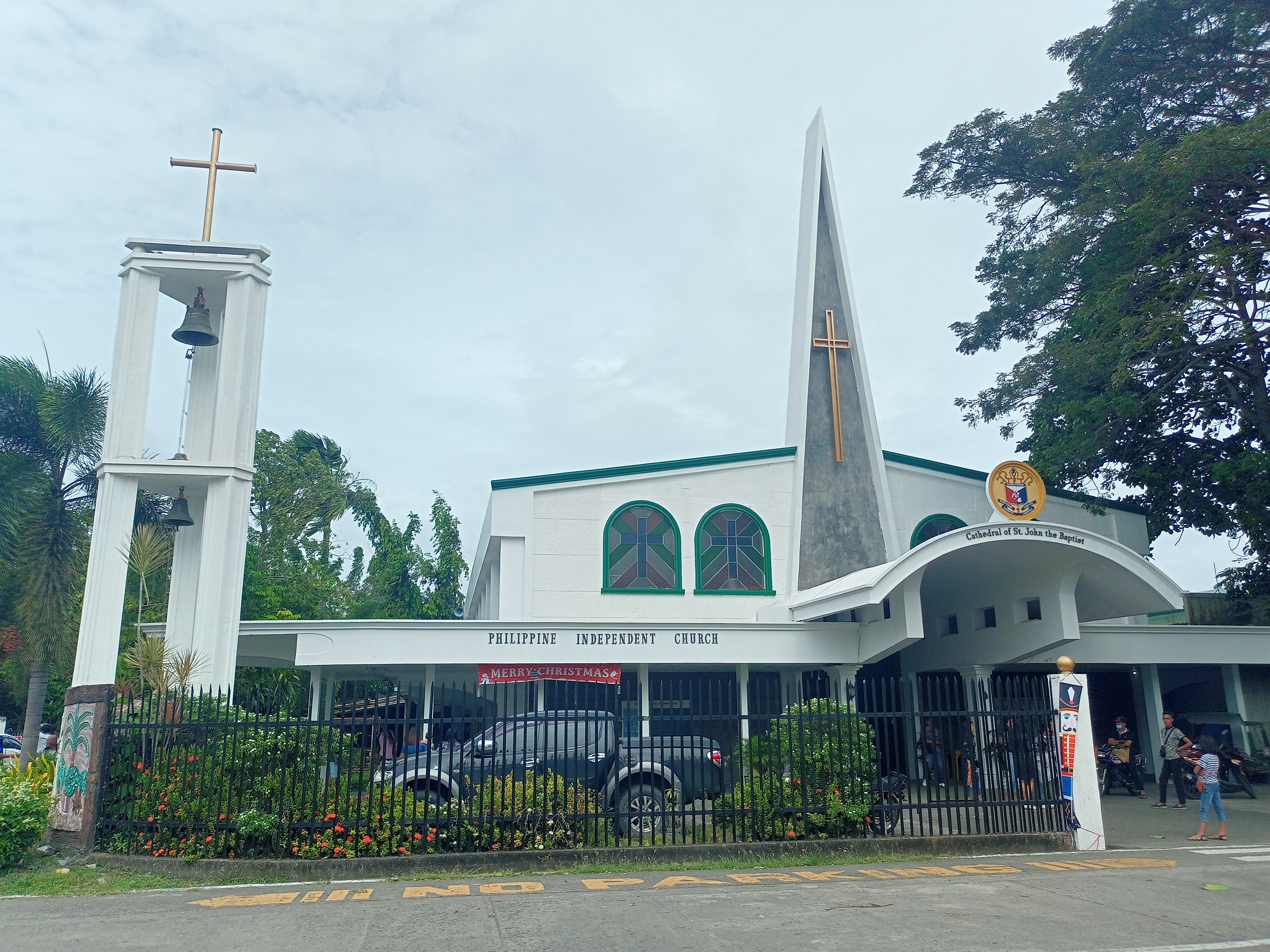
Cathedral of St. John the Baptist in Bago City, Negros Occidental

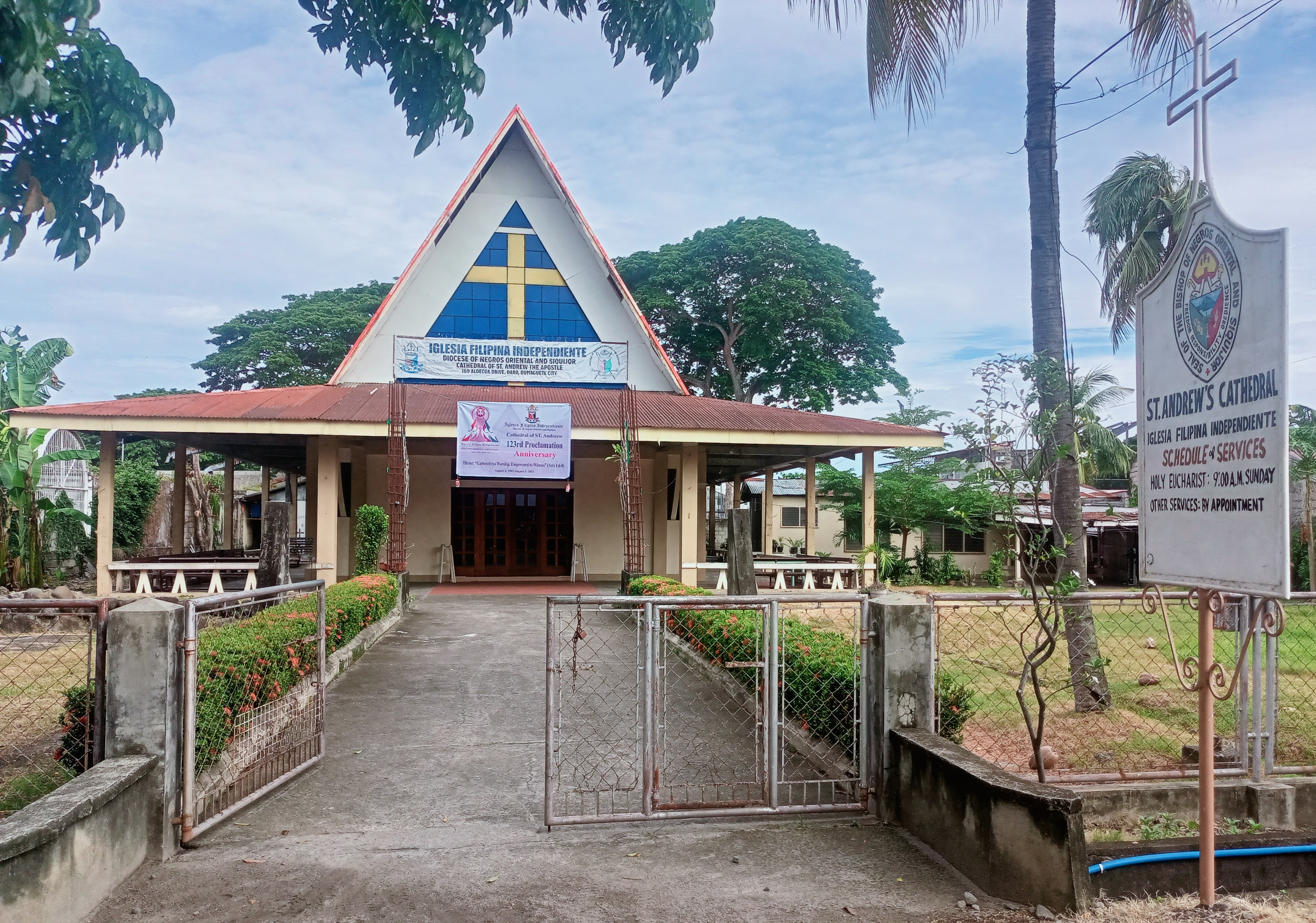
Cathedral of St. Andrew the Apostle in Dumaguete City, Negros Oriental

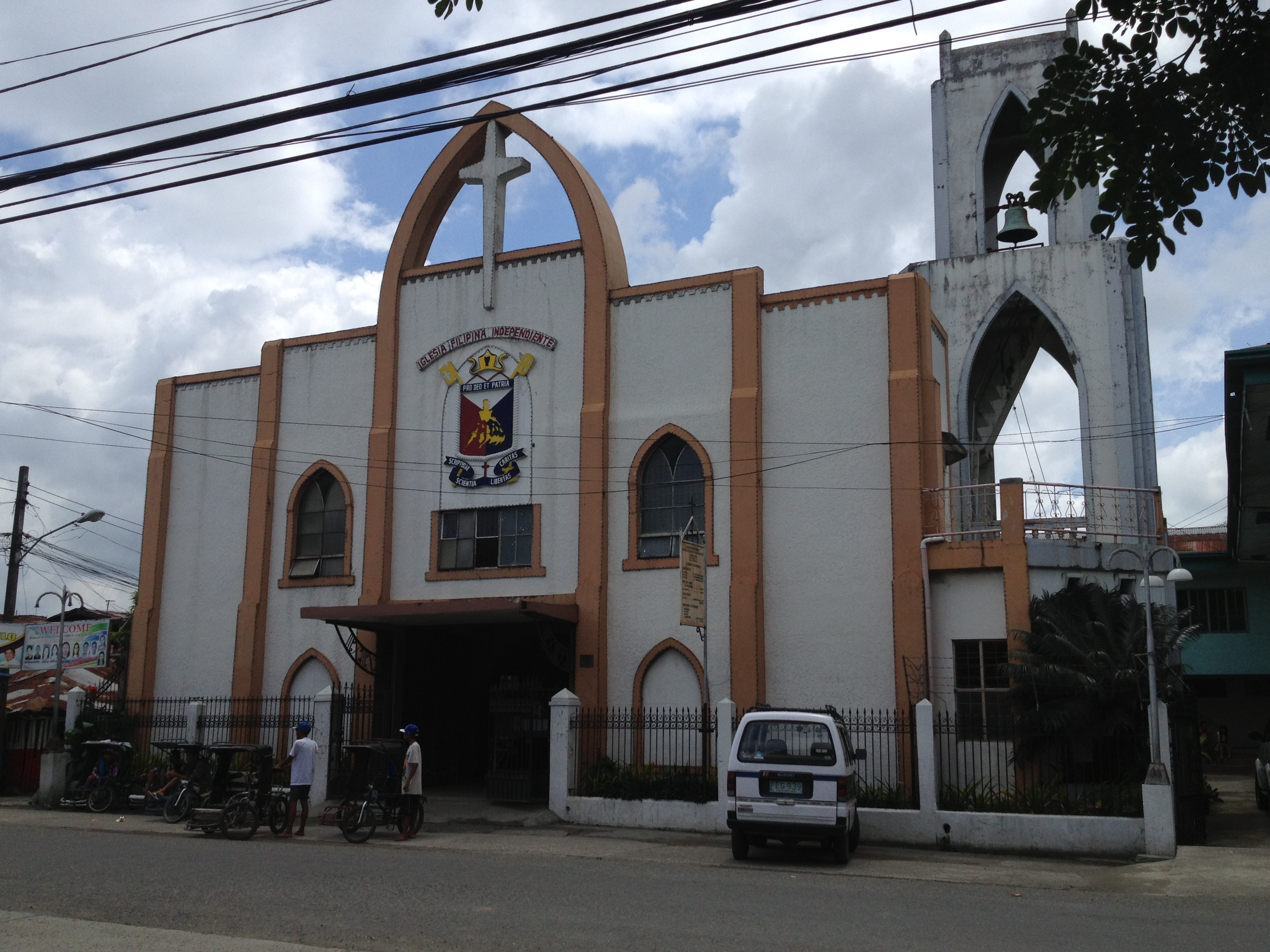
Cathedral of Our Lady of Peace and Good Voyage in La Paz, Iloilo City

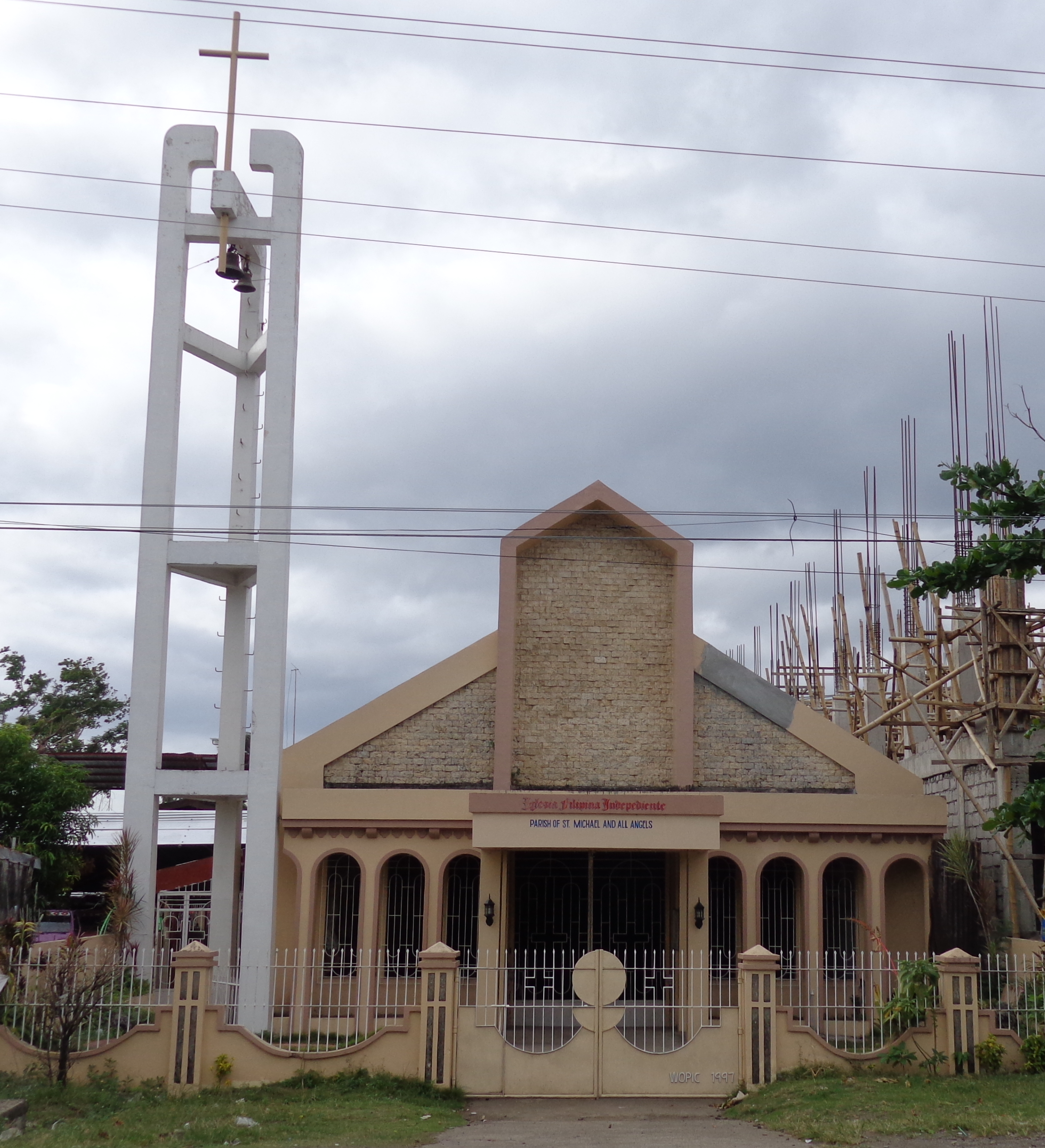
Pro-Cathedral Parish of St. Michael and All Angels in Culasi, Antique
- Cathedral of the Holy Child (Sto. Niño) in Cebu City
- Cathedral Church of St. Joseph the Worker in Tagbilaran
- Cathedral of St. Jude Thaddeus in Sibalom
- Cathedral of Our Lady of Providence and Guidance in Numancia, Aklan
- Cathedral of St. James the Apostle in Padre Burgos, Southern Leyte
- Cathedral of Our Lady of Peace and Good Voyage in Almeria, Biliran
- Cathedral of the Holy Trinity in Calbayog
- Cathedral of St. John the Baptist in Bago, Negros Occidental
- Cathedral of St. Andrew the Apostle in Dumaguete
- Cathedral of Our Lady of Salvation in Buenavista, Guimaras
- Cathedral of Our Lady of Peace and Good Voyage in Iloilo City
- Pro-Cathedral of St. Joseph in Candijay
- Pro-Cathedral Parish of Our Lady of the Most Holy Rosary in New Washington, Aklan
- Pro-Cathedral Parish of St. Michael and All Angels in Culasi

=== West Mindanao Bishops' Conference ===
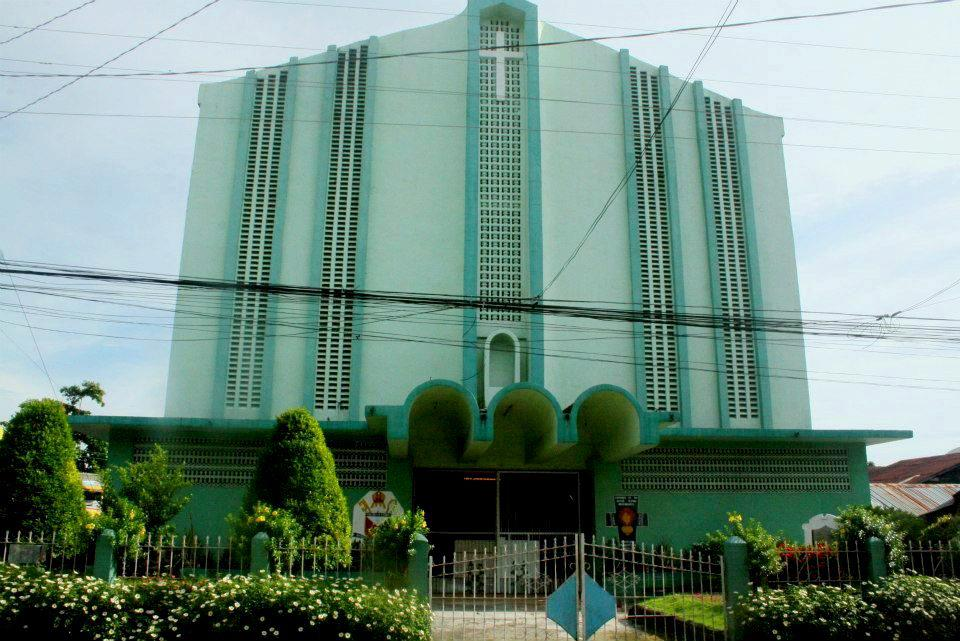
Cathedral Church of St. Mary in Ozamiz City, Misamis Occidental
- Cathedral Church of St. Mary in Ozamiz
- Cathedral of St. Luke, the Apostle and Physician in Pagadian
- Cathedral of St. James, the Lord's Brother and the Just in Tubod, Lanao del Norte
- Cathedral of St. Mary in Oroquieta
- Metropolitan Cathedral of Jesus the Nazarene in Cagayan de Oro
- Pro-Cathedral of the Sacred Heart of Jesus in Sugbongcogon
- Cathedral of St. Matthew in Libertad, Misamis Oriental
- Cathedral of the Transfiguration in Malaybalay
- Cathedral of the Holy Trinity in Koronadal
- Pro-Cathedral Parish of St. Anthony of Padua in Poblacion, Koronadal
- Pro-Cathedral Parish of the Virgin Mary in Bulua, Cagayan de Oro
- Pro-Cathedral Parish of the Ascension of the Lord in Kabacan
- Pro-Cathedral Parish of St. John the Baptist in Bula, General Santos

=== East Mindanao Bishops' Conference ===
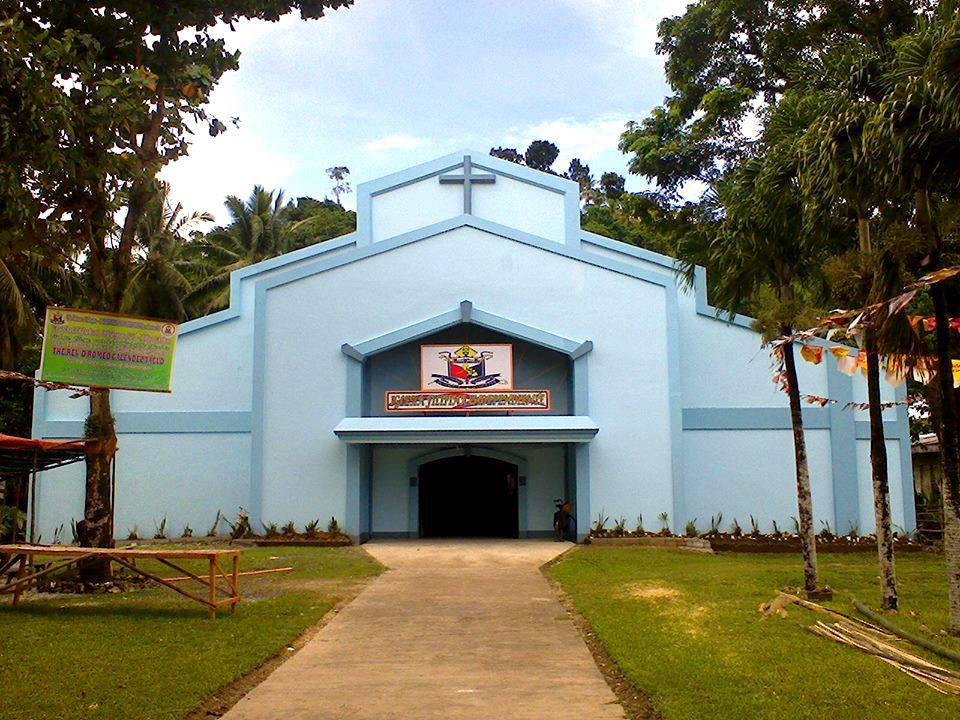
Cathedral of the Holy Child in Dapa, Surigao del Norte

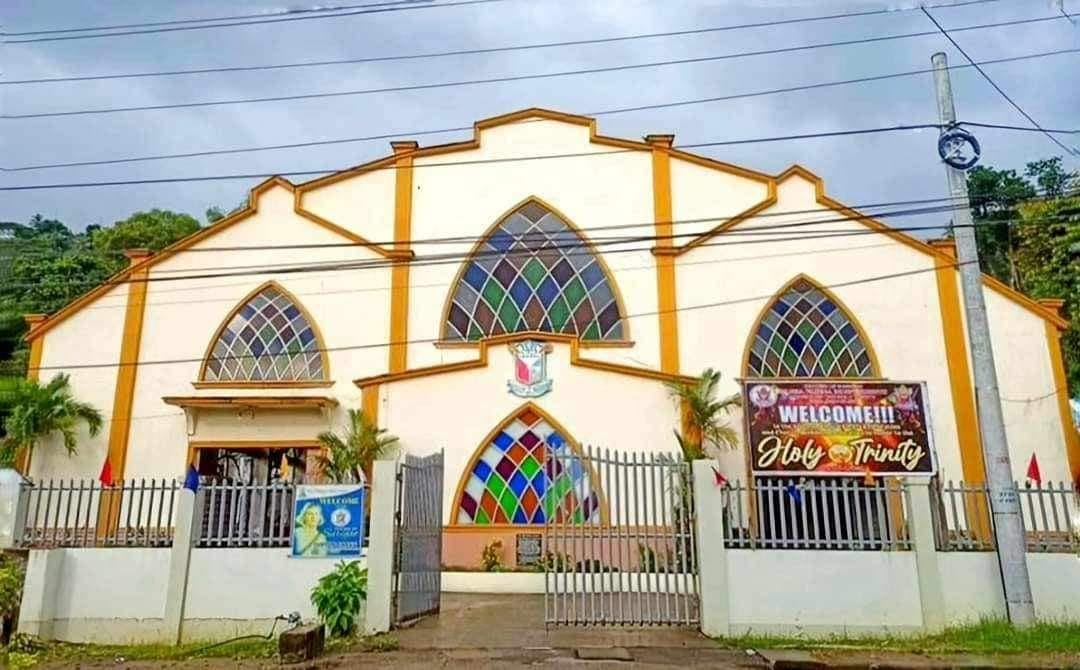
Cathedral of the Most Holy Trinity in Placer, Surigao del Norte

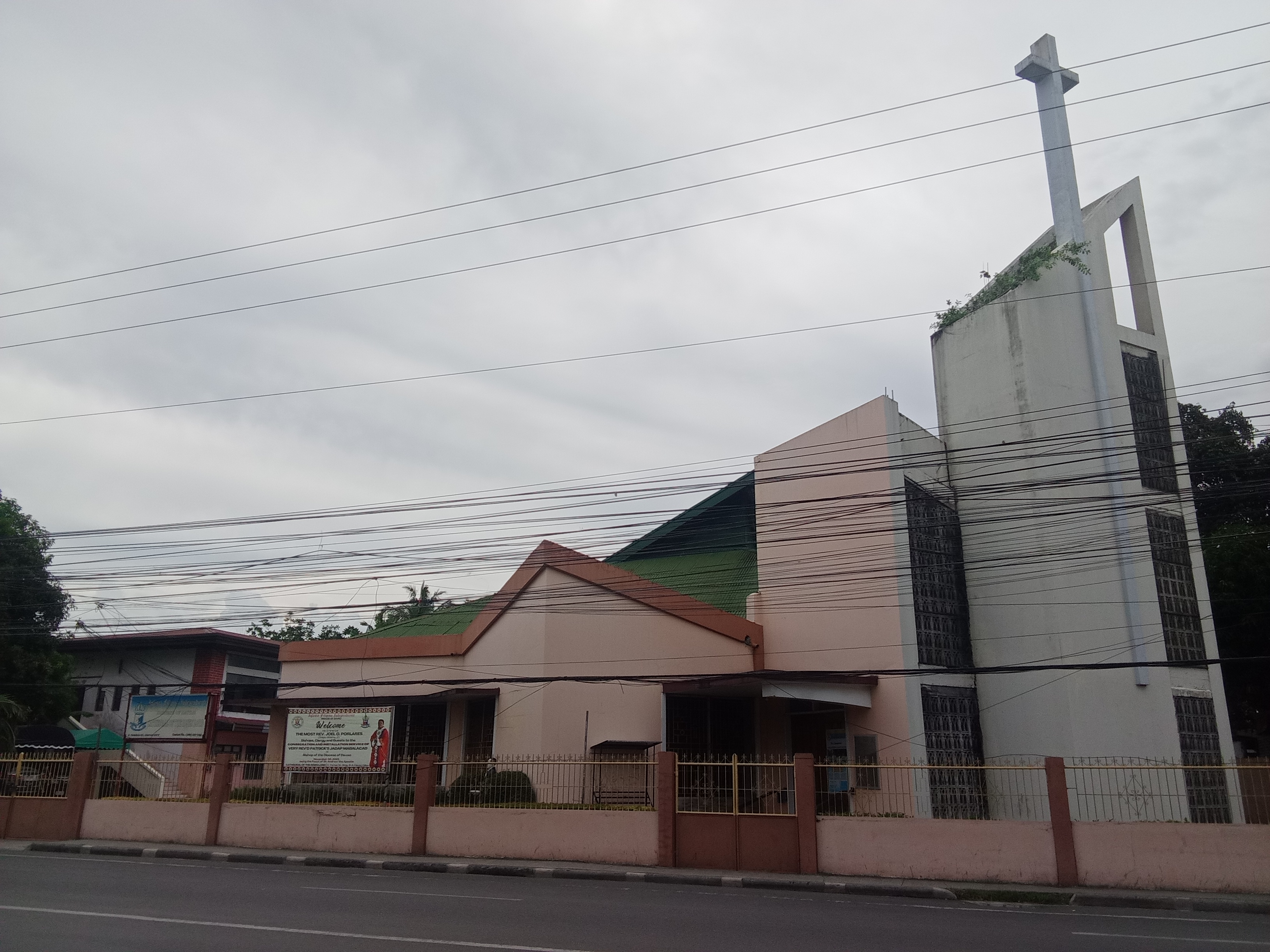
Cathedral of the Risen Lord in Davao City
- Cathedral of the Transfiguration in Surigao City
- Cathedral of the Holy Child in Dapa, Surigao del Norte
- Cathedral of the Blessed Virgin Mary in Dinagat, Dinagat Islands
- Cathedral of Our Lady of Presentation in Cabadbaran
- Cathedral of St. Joseph, SBVM in Cortes, Surigao del Sur
- Cathedral of the Risen Lord in Davao City
- Church of the Most Holy Trinity in Placer, Surigao del Norte

== Episcopal Church ==
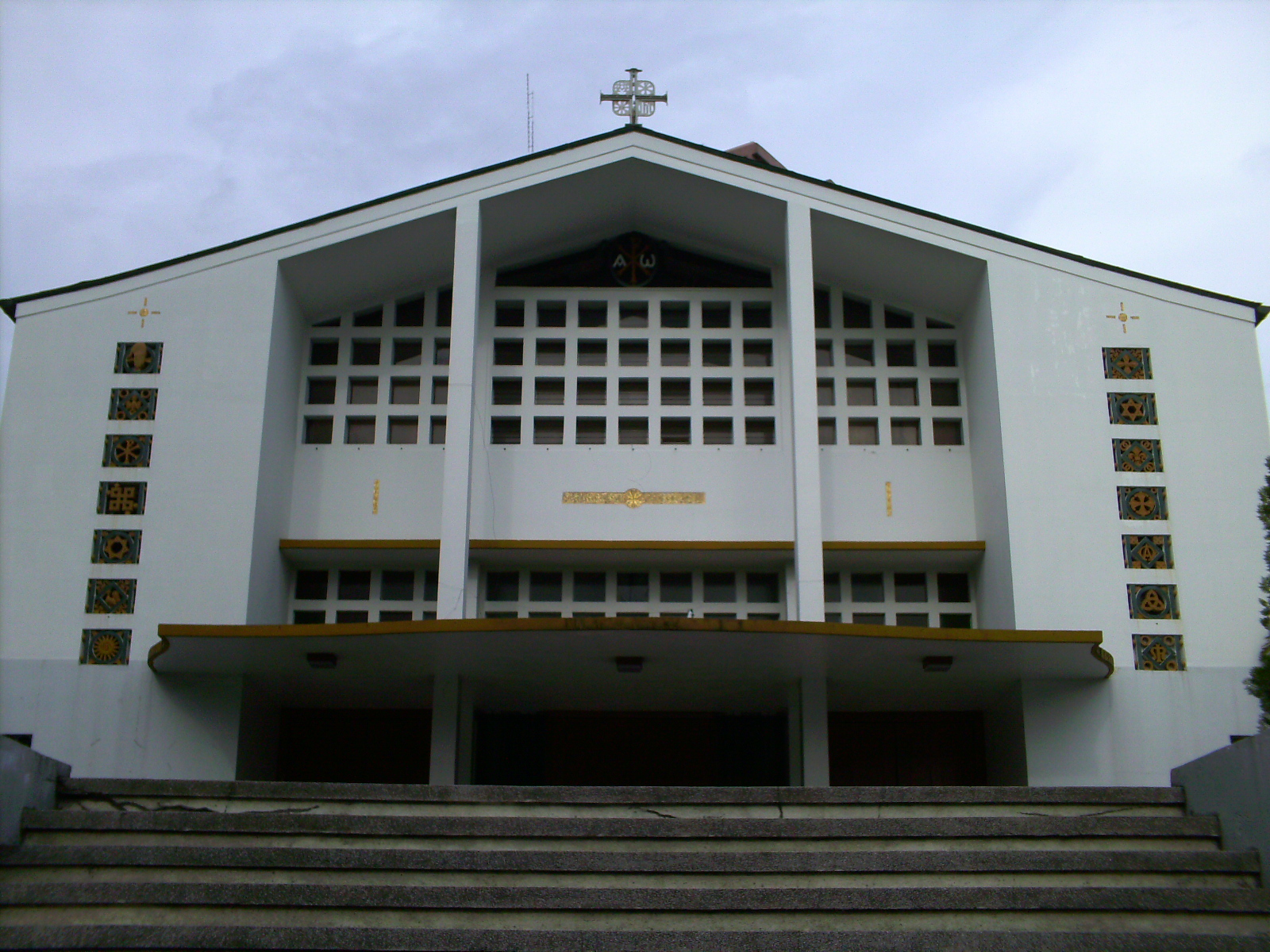
National Cathedral and Collegiate Church of St. Mary and St. John in Quezon City

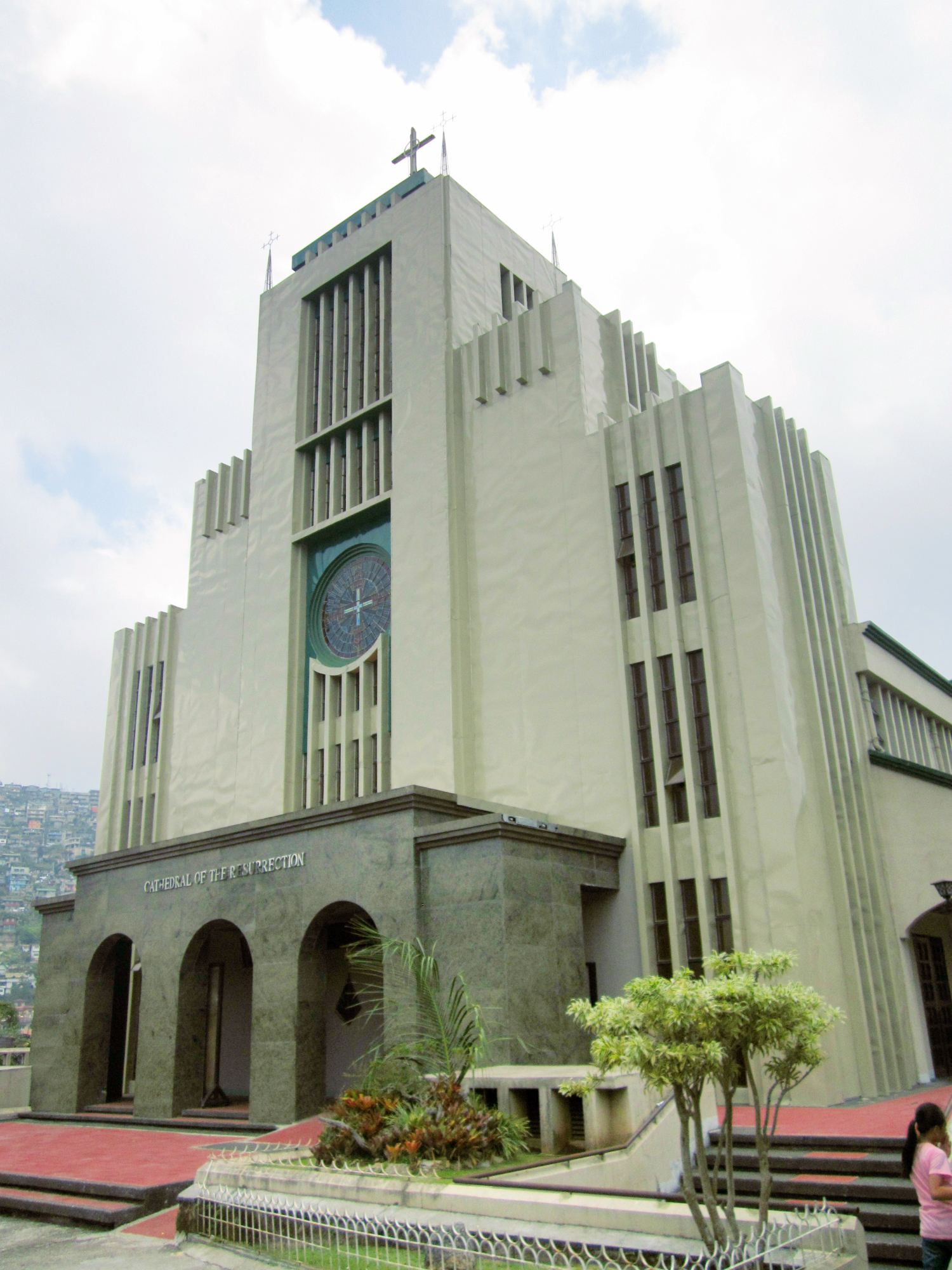
Cathedral of the Resurrection in Baguio

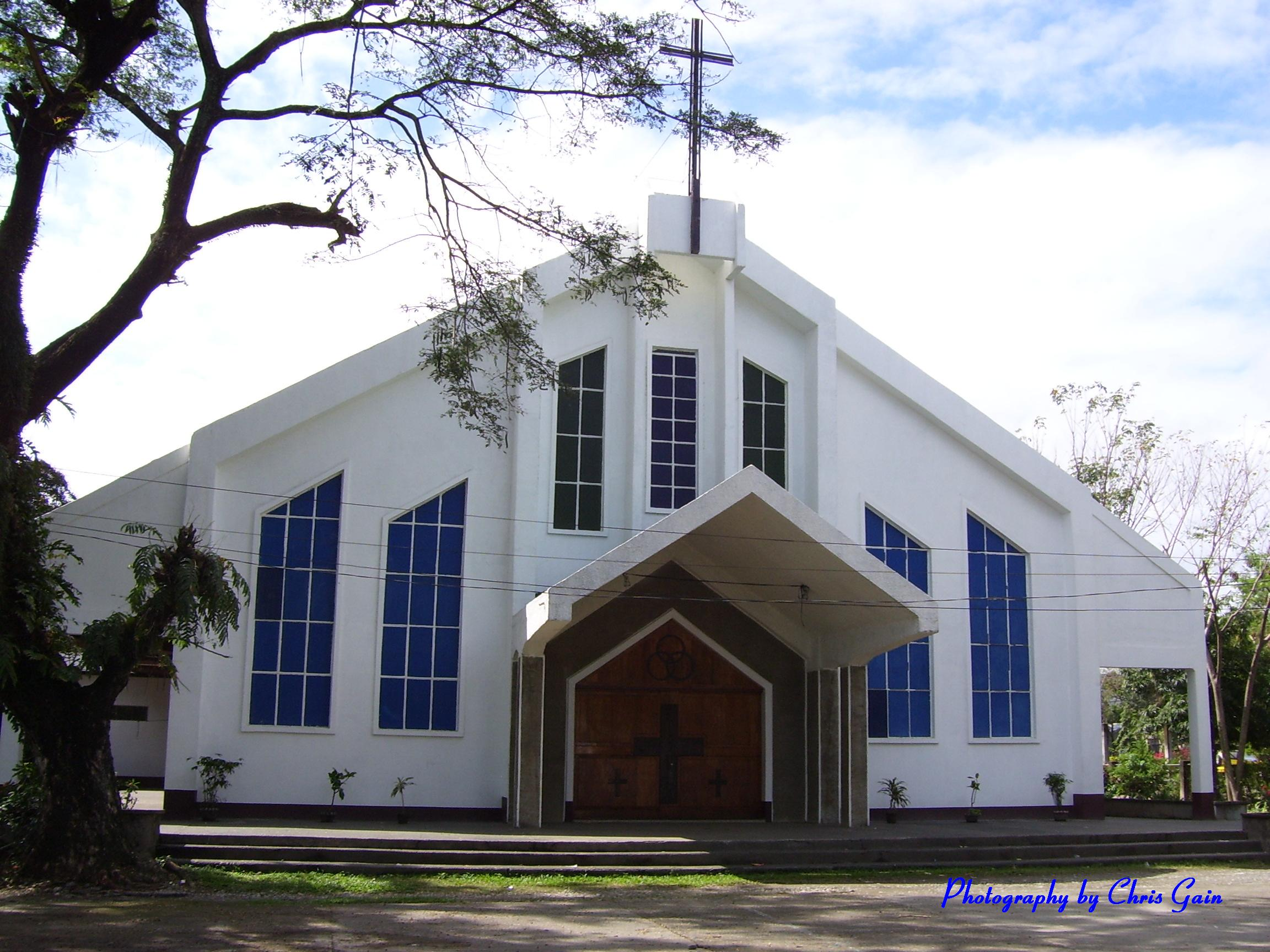
Cathedral of the Holy Trinity in Tabuk, Kalinga

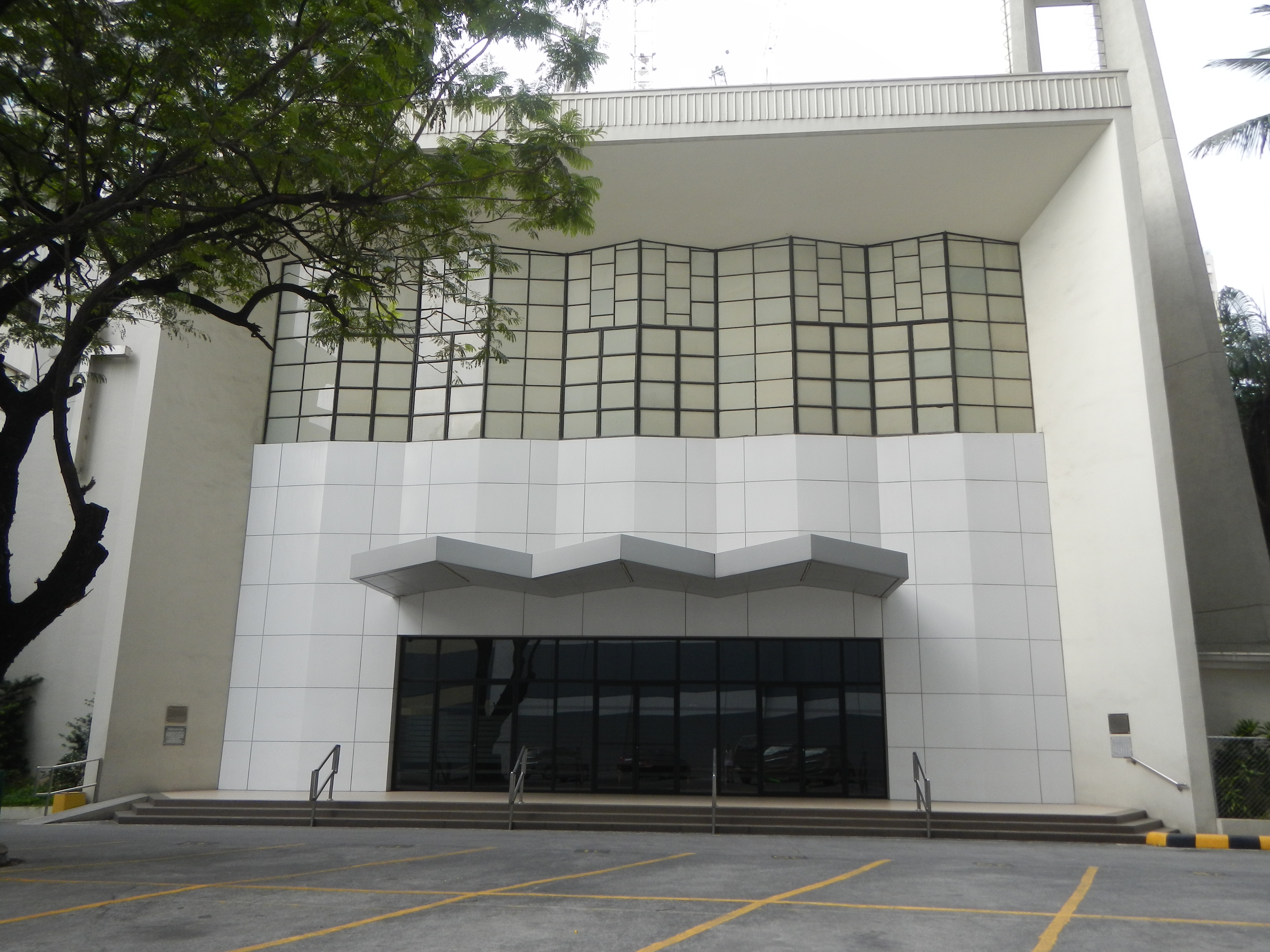
Pro-Cathedral of St. Stephen's Parish in Manila

Cathedrals of the Episcopal Church in the Philippines, an autonomous province of the Anglican Communion:

- Cathedral of the Resurrection in Baguio
- Pro-Cathedral of St. Stephen's Parish in Manila
- Cathedral Church of St. Peter & St. Paul in Cotabato City
- All Saints Cathedral in Bontoc, Mountain Province
- Church of the Holy Trinity in Tabuk, Kalinga
- Cathedral of St. Mary and St. John, the national cathedral, in Quezon City

== Philippine Independent Catholic Church (offshoot) ==
Note: The Philippine Independent Catholic Church, also known as Iglesia Catolica Filipina Independiente, is distinct from the Philippine Independent Church or Iglesia Filipina Independiente. Below is a list of its cathedrals:

- National Cathedral of the Holy Child Jesus, 594 4th Street, Paliparan, Marikina
- Cathedral of Jesus the Good Shepherd, Mayantoc, Tarlac
- Cathedral of Christ the King, Padre Burgos, Southern Leyte
- Cathedral of Jesus the Good Shepherd, Digman Street, Bacoor, Cavite
- Cathedral of St. Isidore the Farmer, Lambac, Guagua, Pampanga

== Catholic Congregation of St. John, Preparer of the Way ==
- Redeemer Church of St. Peter, Km. 52 Manila East Road, Brgy. Tandang Kutyo, Tanay, Rizal
- Cathedral of St. John the Baptist, 2nd Floor, Unit 205, State Condo IV, Ortigas Avenue, Greenhills, San Juan City

== Charismatic Episcopal Church ==
- Cathedral of Saint John The Divine, 10 Fule Sahagun Street, Barangay VII-A, San Pablo City, Laguna 4000
- Cathedral Church of Saint Michael, 711 Capitol Subdivision, Osmeña Avenue, Kalibo City, Aklan 5600
- Cathedral of Christ the Redeemer, Lugod Street Corner of Rizal Street, Ginoog City, Misamis Oriental 9014
- Cathedral of the King, 4796 Sampaguita Street, Marimar Village 1, Sun Valley, Paranaque

== Simbahang Katoliko Pilipino Kristiyano ==
- Cathedral Shrine of the Risen Lord, Sauyo, Quezon City

== Vatican in Exile ==
- Primatial Cathedral of Our Lady of Fatima, Carissa North 6 Subdivision, Barangay Sto. Cristo, City of San Jose del Monte, Bulacan

== Apostolic Catholic Church ==
- Patriarchal Cathedral Shrine of the Paraclete, 1025 Epifanio de los Santos Ave, Project 7, Quezon City, 1105
- Cathedral of Our Lady of the Pillar, Pastor Avenue, Barangay Pallocan West, Batangas City, Batangas
- Cathedral of Our Lady of Ocotlan, Block 8, Kabisig Floodway, Barangay San Andres, Cainta, Rizal
- Cathedral of Our Lady of the Miraculous Medal, 25 Blue Eagle Street, Barangay Rizal, Makati
- Cathedral of Our Lady of Fatima, Bucana, Bahay Pare, Candaba, Pampanga
- Cathedral of Our Lady of Mount Carmel, Rafael A. Jose Street, San Juan, Balagtas, Bulacan

== See also ==
- List of Catholic churches in the Philippines
- List of cathedrals
- Christianity in the Philippines
