= Martin Jumoad =

Filipino prelate (born 1956)

His Excellency, The Most Reverend Martin Sarmiento Jumoad D.D.
- Metropolitan Archbishop of Ozamis
- See: Ozamis
- Appointed: October 4, 2016
- Installed: November 30, 2016
- Predecessor: Jesus Dosado
- Previous posts: Prelate of Isabela (2002–2016); Apostolic Administrator of Pagadian (2024–2025)

Orders
- Ordination: April 7, 1983
- Consecration: January 10, 2002 by Carmelo Morelos

Personal details
- Born: November 11, 1956 (age 70) Cebu City, Philippines
- Denomination: Roman Catholic
- Residence: Archbishop's House, P.O. Box 2760, Catadman, 7200 Ozamiz City, Philippines
- Motto: Fides et Spes (Latin for 'Faith and Hope')
- Coat of arms: Martin Sarmiento Jumoad's coat of arms

Ordination history
History
Episcopal consecration
- Principal consecrator: Carmelo Morelos
- Co-consecrators: Antonio Ledesma; Angelito Lampon
Episcopal succession
Bishops consecrated by Martin Jumoad as principal consecrator
- Ronald Timoner: August 13, 2025

Styles of Martin Jumoad
- Reference style: The Most Reverend
- Spoken style: Your Excellency
- Religious style: Archbishop

Martin Sarmiento Jumoad (born November 11, 1956, in Cebu City), is a prelate of the Roman Catholic Church in the Philippines. He is the Archbishop of Ozamis in Ozamiz, Misamis Occidental, Philippines.

== Early life and episcopacy ==
Martin S. Jumoad was born on November 11, 1956, in Kinasangan, Pardo, Cebu City. He was ordained a priest on April 7, 1983. Pope John Paul II appointed him Prelate of Isabela, Basilan on Nov. 21, 2001. His episcopal ordination as the Third Bishop-Prelate of Isabela (Basilan) was held on Jan. 10, 2002 and installed on Jan. 12, 2002.

As a priest he served the dioceses in various capacities.

He was Assistant Pastor of Isabela Cathedral (1983–1986), Pastor of the parish of St. Anthony in Lamitan (1986–1989), Assistant and later dean of the “Remase” seminarians in Davao (1990–1992), Pastor of the parish of St. Peter in Lamitan (1992–1994), Chancellor of the Prelature of Isabela (1998–2001), Director of Claret College of Isabela (1999–2001) and Administrator of the Prelature of Isabela (2001). He speaks English, Tagalog, Bisaya and Chavacano.

Pope Francis named him Archbishop of Ozamis on October 4, 2016, succeeding Msgr. Jesus Dosado.

At the time of appointment as Archbishop of Ozamis he was member of national bishops’ conferences’ Commission on Migrants and Itinerant People (ECMI) and the Episcopal Commission on Mission (ECM).

On August 5, 2025, he ordered the temporary closing of St. John the Baptist Parish in Jimenez, Misamis Occidental for further investigation after the church's desecration.

Catholic Church titles
Preceded by Jesus Dosado	Archbishop of Ozamis; November 30, 2016 – present	Incumbent
Preceded by Romulo T. Dela Cruz	Prelate of Isabela; January 10, 2002 – October 4, 2016	Succeeded by Leo Dalmao, CMF
