= Jesus Dosado =

Filipino prelate of the Catholic Church (1939–2020)

The Most Reverend Jesús Armamento Dosado C.M.
- Archbishop of Ozamis
- Church: Catholic Church; Latin Church
- Diocese: Ozamis
- Appointed: 29 July 1981
- Term ended: 4 October 2016
- Predecessor: Jesus Yu Varela
- Successor: Martin Sarmiento Jumoad
- Previous posts: Auxiliary Bishop of Cebu (1977‍–‍1979); Auxiliary Bishop of Cagayan de Oro (1979‍–‍1981)

Personal details
- Born: 1 September 1939 Sogod, Cebu, Commonwealth of the Philippines
- Died: 22 June 2020 (aged 80) Ozamiz City, Philippines
- Buried: Metropolitan Cathedral of the Immaculate Conception in Ozamiz City
- Motto: Evangelizare pauperibus (Latin for 'Declare the Good News to the poor')
- Coat of arms: Jesús Armamento Dosado's coat of arms

Ordination history
History
Episcopal consecration
- Principal consecrator: Julio Rosales y Ras
- Co-consecrators: Antonio Lloren Mabutas, Teotimo Cruel Pacis

Jesús Armamento Dosado C.M., D.D. (1 September 1939 – 22 June 2020) was a Vincentian Filipino prelate of the Catholic Church in the Philippines. He served as the Bishop and later Archbishop of Ozamis from 1981 until his retirement in 2016.

== Early life and education ==
Dosado was born in Sogod, Cebu on 1 September 1939. After studying at Sogod Central School (1945–1951) and Cebu Northern High School (1951–1952), he entered the Seminario Mayor de San Carlos in Cebu City (1952–1956), which was then managed by the Vincentians.

Afterwards, he decided to join the Vincentians and after a year of studying in their St. Vincent's Seminary, Polo, Bulacan, he was admitted to the said congregation on June 15, 1957, alongside future Adamson University President Fr. Rolando de la Goza, CM. After his two-year novitiate in the same seminary, he was sent to the United States, where he took his Philosophical Studies at St. Mary's Seminary, Missouri (1959–1962), and his Theological Studies at DeAndreis Institute of Theology, Illinois (1962–1966). He would later be sent to the University of Comillas in Spain for his Licentiate Degree (1969–1971).

== Pastoral ministry ==
Dosado was ordained priest for the Vincentian Fathers on 28 May 1966. After his ordination, he was assigned to his alma mater, the Seminario Mayor de San Carlos, serving as Professor (1966–1969), Spiritual Director (1971–1972), and eventually its first Filipino Rector (1972–1978). As seminary formator, he was responsible for the education and training of the diocesan seminarians of the Archdiocese of Cebu and the nearby dioceses. During his tenure as Rector, he brought clear and distinct policies for the seminarians, and attempted to do improvements in the administration of the seminary. From 1973 to 1978, he was elected to the Vincentian Provincial Council, and was the Assistant Provincial from 1976 to 1978.

== Episcopate ==
On 31 October 1977, at the age of 38, he was appointed by Pope Paul VI as Auxiliary Bishop of Cebu and titular bishop of Nabala. He was consecrated bishop at Manila Cathedral on January 25, 1978 by Cebu Archbishop Julio Cardinal Rosales, with Davao Archbishop Antonio Mabutas and Legazpi Bishop Teotimo Pacis, CM as co-consecrators. A year later, he was appointed by Pope John Paul II as Auxiliary Bishop of Cagayan de Oro. As auxiliary bishop, he assisted Cardinal Rosales and Cagayan de Oro Archbishop Patrick Cronin in the governance of their respective sees.

On 29 July 1981, Pope John Paul II appointed Dosado as the new Bishop of Ozamis, replacing Bishop Jesus Varela, who was transferred to the Diocese of Sorsogon. Upon the elevation of the Diocese of Ozamis as an archdiocese in 1983, Dosado was likewise elevated to the archiepiscopate, making him the first Archbishop of Ozamis.

== Retirement and death ==
He retired in 2016, at the age of 77 years old, He was succeeded by the Prelate of Isabela, Bishop Martin Jumoad.

He died on 22 June 2020. His body was laid to rest inside the Metropolitan Cathedral of the Immaculate Conception in Ozamiz City.

Catholic Church titles
Preceded by Jesus Varela	Archbishop of Ozamis; 1981–2016	Succeeded by Martin Jumoad
