= Leo Dalmao =

Filipino Catholic bishop (born 1969)

The Most Reverend Leo Magdugo Dalmao CMF, D.D.
- Prelate of Isabela
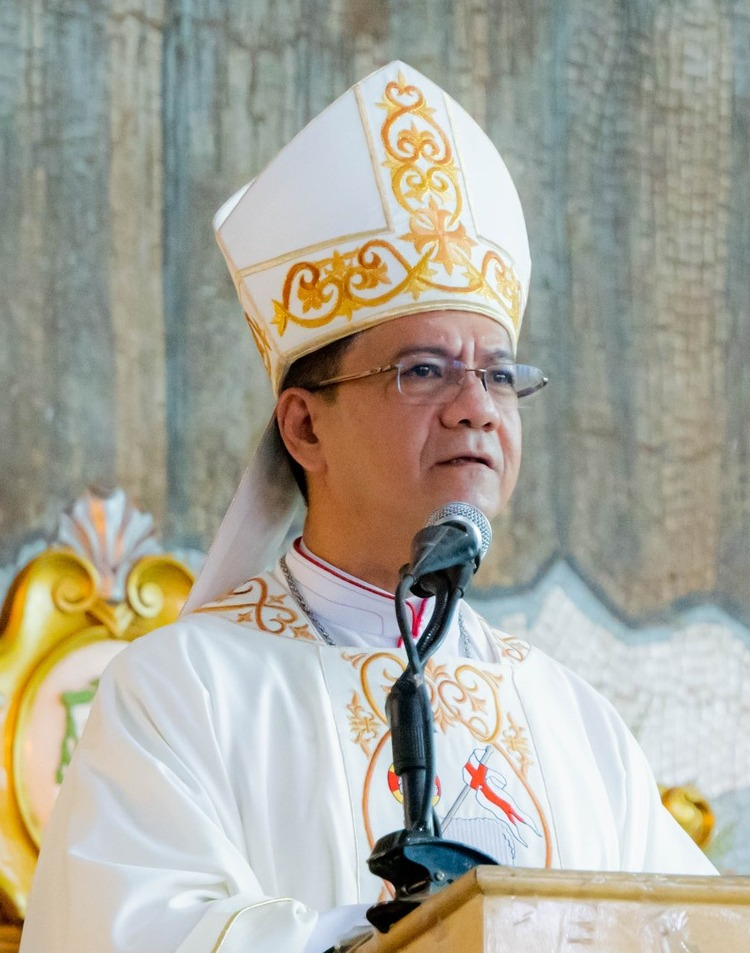
- Dalmao in 2024
- Province: Zamboanga
- See: Isabela
- Appointed: March 25, 2019
- Installed: May 24, 2019
- Predecessor: Martin S. Jumoad
- Previous posts: Provincial Superior, Claretian Missionaries in the Philippines (2010–2015); General Consultor and Prefect of Formation, General Curia of the Claretian Missionaries (2015–2019)

Orders
- Ordination: May 31, 1997 by José María Querejeta, CMF
- Consecration: May 24, 2019 by Romulo T. de la Cruz

Personal details
- Born: December 1, 1969 (age 56) Tagbilaran, Bohol, Philippines
- Denomination: Roman Catholic Church
- Motto: Ut vitam habeant (Latin for 'That they may have life')
- Coat of arms: Leo Magdugo Dalmao's coat of arms

Ordination history
History
Priestly ordination
- Ordained by: José María Querejeta, CMF
Episcopal consecration
- Principal consecrator: Romulo T. de la Cruz
- Co-consecrators: Martin Jumoad; Romulo Valles
- Styles
- Reference style: His Excellency; The Most Reverend
- Spoken style: Your Excellency
- Religious style: Bishop

Leo Magdugo Dalmao, CMF (born December 1, 1969) is a Filipino bishop of the Roman Catholic Church, currently serving as the bishop-prelate of the Prelature of Isabela in Basilan, Philippines. He was appointed as bishop by Pope Francis on March 25, 2019.

== Early life and education ==
Dalmao was born in Tagbilaran, Bohol, on December 1, 1969. His parents are Wilfredo Dalmao and Rosario Magdugo. He was baptized at St. Joseph Cathedral in Tagbilaran City. After completing his elementary and secondary education in his hometown, he joined the Claretian Missionaries in 1986. He studied philosophy at St. Anthony Mary Claret College in Quezon City. He later earned a master's degree in theology at the Loyola School of Theology, Ateneo de Manila University in Quezon City.

He made his first religious profession on May 3, 1992, in Zamboanga City. He professed his perpetual vows in the Claretians on July 16, 1996, and was ordained a priest by Bishop Jose Maria Querejeta on May 31, 1997, at the Immaculate Heart of Mary Parish in Quezon City.

== Priesthood ==
Following his ordination, Dalmao served in various pastoral and administrative capacities within the Claretian Missionaries. His initial assignments included working as the project coordinator of the Claret Samal Foundation Inc. in Basilan from 1997 to 2000, where he was later appointed local superior of the province from 1999 to 2000. In 2000, he became the rector of the Claret Theology House in Tandang Sora, Quezon City, a role he held until 2003.

His leadership in religious formation continued when he was appointed novice master of the Claret Novitiate House in Bunguiao, Zamboanga City, in 2003, and later at the Claret Novitiate House in Ormoc City, Leyte, where he served until 2010. From 2010 to 2015, he was the provincial superior of the Claretian Missionaries in the Philippines, while also serving as co-chairperson of the Association of Major Religious Superiors in the Philippines (AMRSP).

In 2015, he was elected as general consultor and prefect of formation at the General Curia of the Claretian Missionaries in Rome, a position he held until his appointment as bishop.

== Episcopal ministry ==
On March 25, 2019, Pope Francis appointed Dalmao as the bishop of the Prelature of Isabela in Basilan, making him the first Claretian to be appointed a bishop in the Philippines. His episcopal consecration took place on May 24, 2019, at the Santa Isabel de Portugal Cathedral in Isabela City, with Archbishop Romulo T. de la Cruz as the principal consecrator and Archbishop Romulo Valles and bishop Martin Jumoad as co-consecrators.

Bishop Dalmao has been a strong advocate for peace and interreligious dialogue in Basilan. In February 2021, he strongly condemned the desecration of two chapels in Lamitan City, Basilan, where religious statues were defaced by unknown assailants on Ash Wednesday. Despite the attacks, he urged the faithful to remain steadfast in their faith and emphasized that such incidents should not divide Christian and Muslim communities. He reiterated that peace-building efforts and interfaith dialogue must continue to foster unity in the province.

In May 2022, following twin explosions in Isabela City that injured at least two individuals, Bishop Dalmao described the incidents as "unfortunate" and called on the community to support all peace initiatives to prevent a return to past conflicts in the province. He reaffirmed his commitment to peace and development, urging those responsible for the attacks to cease violent actions and instead contribute to the progress of the region. Additionally, he strongly condemned the bomb blasts in Basilan, highlighting the importance of maintaining peace and security in the region.

== Health ==
On December 24, 2024, Bishop Dalmao experienced a medical emergency while presiding over the Midnight Mass at Sta. Isabel de Portugal Cathedral in Isabela City. He felt unwell during the service and was immediately transported by sea ambulance to Zamboanga City for medical attention. Medical tests revealed a ruptured aorta, requiring his transfer to a specialized facility in Metro Manila for urgent surgery.

Following surgery, Bishop Dalmao was discharged from the hospital and continued his recovery at a care facility in Quezon City. By January 2025, reports confirmed that he was recuperating well, with fellow clergy expressing optimism about his condition.

Catholic Church titles
Preceded by Martin S. Jumoad	Prelate of Isabela; May 24, 2019 – present	Incumbent
