= Archdiocese of Ozamis =

Latin Catholic archdiocese in the Philippines

Coordinates: 8.1459°N 123.8430°E

Archdiocese of Ozamis Archidioecesis Ozamisanus Arkidiyosesis sa Ozamis Arkidiyosesis ng Ozamis

Catholic
- Façade of Ozamiz Cathedral

- Coat of arms

Location
- Country: Philippines
- Territory: Misamis Occidental
- Ecclesiastical province: Ozamis
- Metropolitan: Ozamis

Statistics
- Area: 1,939 km^{2} (749 sq mi)
- Population: Total; Catholics: (as of 2021); 741,160; 470,485 (63.5%)

Information
- Denomination: Catholic
- Sui iuris church: Latin Church
- Rite: Roman Rite
- Cathedral: Metropolitan Cathedral of the Immaculate Conception
- Patron saint: Immaculate Conception; Blessed Virgin of the Fort

Current leadership
- Pope: Leo XIV
- Metropolitan Archbishop: Martin Jumoad
- Suffragan: (Diocese of Dipolog) Severo Caermare (Diocese of Iligan) Jose Rapadas III (Diocese of Pagadian) Ronald Timoner (Territorial Prelature of Marawi) Edwin de la Peña, MSP
- Vicar General: Msgr. Maximino A. Naron, Jr.

Website
- Website of the Archdiocese

The Archdiocese of Ozamis is a metropolitan Latin Catholic archdiocese of the Catholic Church in the province of Misamis Occidental. The archdiocese cathedral is the Metropolitan Cathedral of the Immaculate Conception in Ozamiz City, and its present archbishop is Martin Jumoad. The official spelling of the archdiocese is Ozamis, while the city it is located in is Ozamiz.

The larger ecclesiastical province over which the archbishop of Ozamis serves as metropolitan see covers the northwestern portion of the island of Mindanao, including the highly urbanized city of Iligan and the provinces of Misamis Occidental, Lanao del Norte, Lanao del Sur, Zamboanga del Norte and Zamboanga del Sur.

== History ==
Coat of arms of the then-Territorial Prelature of Ozamis

The Territorial Prelature of Ozamis was erected on 27 January 1951 from the territory of the then-diocese of Cagayan de Oro. This prelature covered the provinces of Lanao (which was split in 1952 into Lanao del Norte and Lanao del Sur) and Misamis Occidental, and the chartered cities of Iligan, Marawi, Oroquieta (established 1969), Ozamiz and Tangub (established 1967).

On 17 February 1971 Pope Paul VI elevated the Prelature of Ozamis into a diocese, covering only parishes within Misamis Occidental, with Jesus Varela appointed as its bishop. The new diocese became a suffragan of the Archdiocese of Zamboanga.

On 24 January 1983, Ozamis was elevated to an archdiocese, with the dioceses of Dipolog (established 1967), Iligan (established 1971) and Pagadian (established 1971), and the Prelature of Marawi (established 1976) as its suffragan dioceses. Jesus Dosado was officially installed as its first archbishop on 10 April 1983.

== Suffragan dioceses ==
- Diocese of Dipolog
- Diocese of Iligan
- Diocese of Pagadian

=== Prelature ===
- Prelature of Marawi

== Ordinaries ==
=== Prelates of Ozamis ===
Prelate		Period in office	Coat of arms
1.	Patrick H. Cronin, S.S.C.M.E.	24 May 1955 – 13 October 1970 (15 years, 142 days)	

=== Bishops of Ozamis ===
Bishop		Period in office	Coat of arms
1.	Jesus Varela	17 February 1971 – 27 November 1980 (9 years, 284 days)	
2.	Jesus Dosado	29 July 1981 – 24 January 1983 (1 year, 179 days)	

=== Archbishops of Ozamis ===
Archbishop		Period in office	Coat of arms
1.	Jesus Dosado	24 January 1983 – 4 October 2016 (33 years, 254 days)	
2.	Martin Jumoad	4 October 2016 – Present (Incumbent)	

== See also ==
- Catholic Church in the Philippines
