= Territorial Prelature of Isabela de Basilan =

Latin Catholic ecclesiastical territory in the Philippines

Territorial Prelature of Isabela Praelatura Territorialis Isabellapolitana Prelatura Teritoryal ng Isabela Prelatura Territorial de Isabela

Catholic
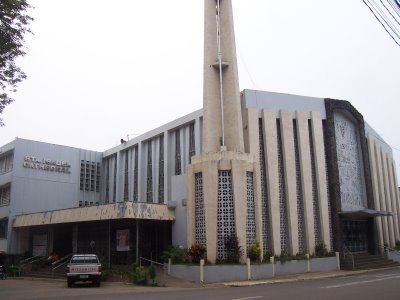
- Isabela Cathedral

- Coat of arms

Location
- Country: Philippines
- Territory: Basilan
- Ecclesiastical province: Zamboanga
- Metropolitan: Zamboanga
- Coordinates: 6°42′21″N 121°58′16″E

Statistics
- Area: 1,359 km^{2} (525 sq mi)
- Population: Total; Catholics: (as of 2021); 456,400; 131,560 (28.8%)

Information
- Denomination: Catholic
- Sui iuris church: Latin Church
- Rite: Roman Rite
- Cathedral: Cathedral of St. Elizabeth of Portugal

Current leadership
- Pope: Leo XIV
- Prelate: Leo M. Dalmao, C.M.F.
- Metropolitan Archbishop: Julius S. Tonel
- Vicar General: Rodel C. Angeles

The Territorial Prelature of Isabela de Basilan, or simply the Territorial Prelature of Isabela (Latin: Praelatura Territorialis Isabellapolitana), is a Latin Catholic territorial prelature located in the province of Basilan, and its component cities of Isabela and Lamitan, in the ecclesiastical province of Zamboanga in the Philippines.

== History ==
The Prelature of Isabela in Basilan was established on October 12, 1963, and comprises the whole of Basilan Province, including Isabela City, its former capital, and Lamitan City, the new capital. Bishop Jose Ma. Querexeta, CMF, was the first bishop−prelate of Isabela. During his term, he established parishes for the Catholics as well as schools for both Muslims and Christians.

The Mindanao War in the 1970s shattered the prelature's dream of Christians and Muslims living peacefully side by side. This was aggravated by the kidnapping of a Spanish Claretian priest in 1987 who had devoted many years of his priestly life in Basilan attending to the spiritual needs of Christians and the economic needs of the poorer Muslims.

Bishop Romulo dela Cruz became the Prelate Ordinary of Basilan in 1989 upon the retirement of Bishop Querexeta. It was during Dela Cruz′s term as a bishop when Islamic Fundamentalism was on the rise and the Abu Sayyaf, a violent fundamentalist group of armed adherents, came into existence.

One Franciscan brother and one Claretian priest were kidnapped in 1992 and 1993 respectively. Not even the local clergy was spared.

Father Cirilo Nacorda was kidnapped on June 8, 1994, and was released three months later, but not before fifteen of his companions were killed and the remaining 25 captives, mostly teachers and health workers, were finally released.

== Vision and Mission of the Prelature ==
For its vision, the church in Basilan hopes to proclaim a Christian understanding of the human person, of society, and the common good of all the people of Basilan, considering its divergent cultures, religions and ideologies.

For its mission it aims to promote a "new spirituality" that unites people in faith and in the Lord, in justice and charity towards neighbor, in a personal conversion that could bring about a change in societal structures. It is the perception of the church in Basilan that the renewal of a vision and a mission, as initiated by the Plenary Council of the Philippines II, is not entirely new for Basilan Christians because of their minority situation. Rather it is a question of deepening this renewal in order to strengthen one's own evangelization, to be able to pass this on to one's neighbor, be he Muslim or Christian.

== Prelates of Isabela ==
Bishop		Period in Office	Coat of Arms
1.	+José María Querexeta y Mendizábal, C.M.F.	October 24, 1963 – January 28, 1989	
2.	+Romulo Tolentino de la Cruz	January 28, 1989 – January 8, 2001	
3.	Martin Sarmiento Jumoad	November 21, 2001 – October 4, 2016	
4.	Leo Magdugo Dalmao, C.M.F.	May 24, 2019 – present	
