= Isabela Cathedral =

Roman Catholic church in Basilan, Philippines

- Saint Elizabeth of Portugal Cathedral Parish
- Parokyang Katedral ni Santa Isabel ng Portugal (Filipino); Parroquia Catedral de Santa Isabel de Portugal (Spanish)
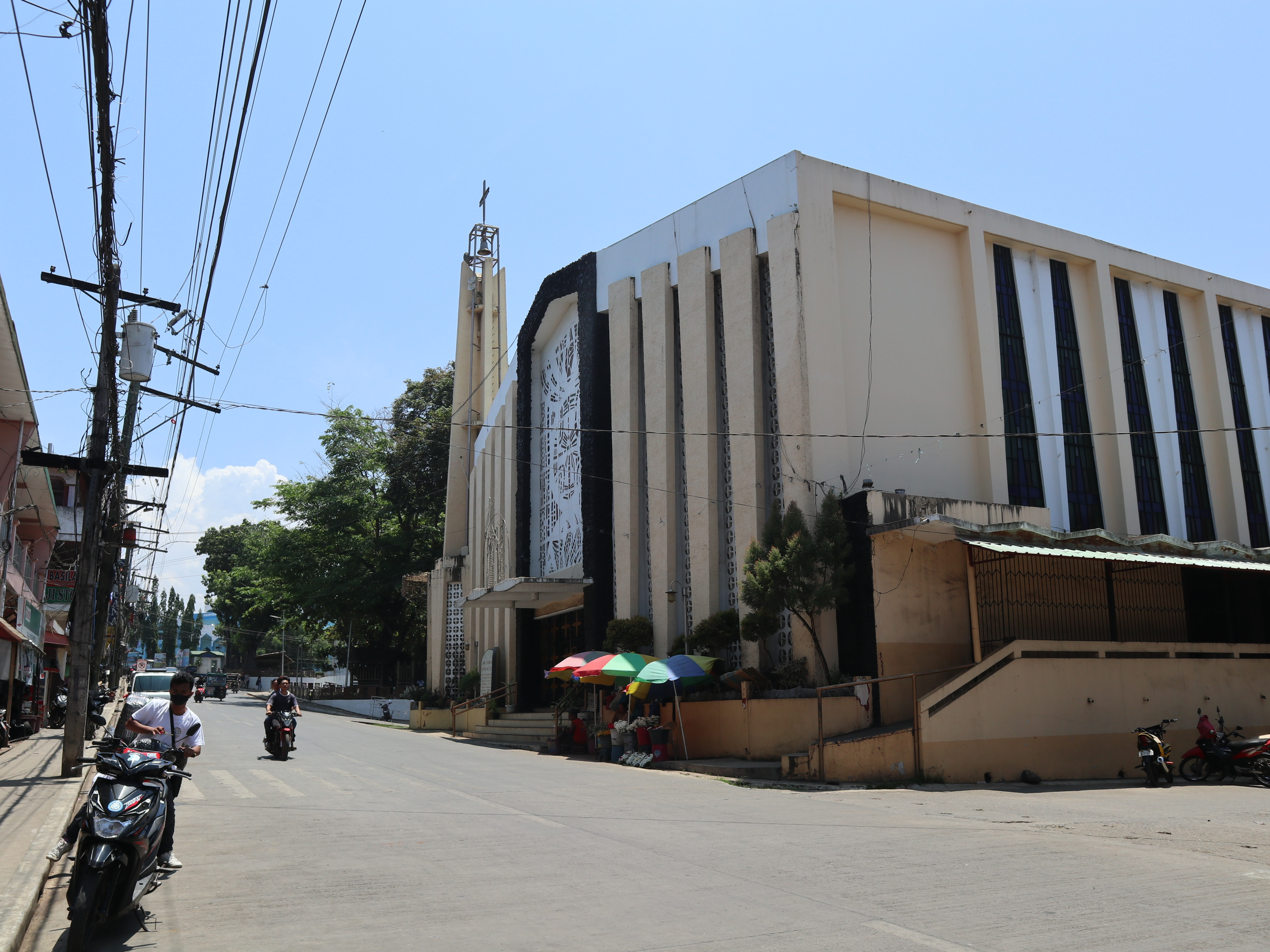
- The cathedral in 2023

- Location in Mindanao Location in the Philippines
- 6°42′21″N 121°58′15″E
- Location: Isabela, Basilan
- Country: Philippines
- Denomination: Roman Catholic

History
- Status: Cathedral
- Founded: 1850
- Dedication: Saint Elizabeth of Portugal
- Consecrated: 1850, 1970

Architecture
- Functional status: Active
- Architectural type: Church building
- Style: Modern
- Groundbreaking: 1964
- Completed: 1970
- Demolished: 1962

Administration
- Province: Zamboanga
- Diocese: Prelature of Isabela

Clergy
- Bishop: Leo Magdugo Dalmao

The Santa Isabel de Portugal Cathedral Parish (Filipino: Parokyang Katedral ni Santa Isabel ng Portugal), also known as Santa Isabel Cathedral (Filipino: Katedral ni Santa Isabel) or Isabela Cathedral (Filipino: Katedral ng Isabela), is a 20th-century Roman Catholic cathedral located at Barangay Seaside Poblacion in the city of Isabela, Basilan, Philippines. It is the seat of the Territorial Prelature of Isabela and is dedicated to Saint Elizabeth of Portugal.

== History ==
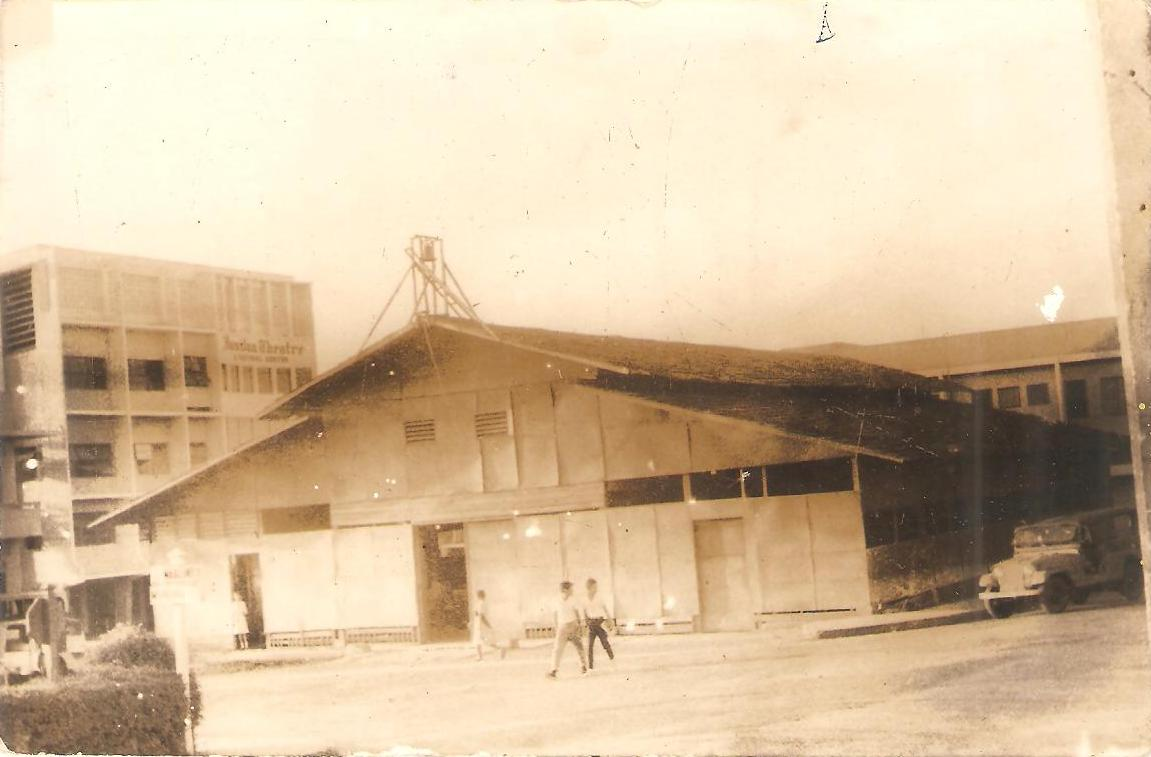
Isabela's church made of wood and galvanized iron roofing before the fire of 1962.

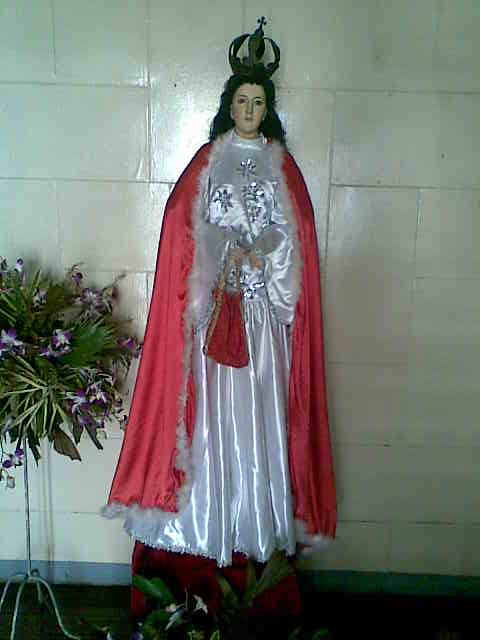
An image of Saint Elizabeth of Portugal in the cathedral.

Before the arrival of the Spanish in the 16th century, the present-day city of Isabela was initially a Yakan community called Pasengen, and Pagpasalan.

The Augustinian Recollects are the pioneers in opening a mission in Basilan. As part of their mission, they have been crossing the Basilan Strait from Zamboanga in mainland Mindanao and in 1850, the Christian mission in Isabela was formally begun through the Recollect friar Jose Riboste. After 12 years, in December 1862, the mission of Basilan was turned over to the members of the Society of Jesus. The Jesuits took over the administration of Isabela when they were requested to return to the Philippines after their expulsion from the country in 1768.

A wooden chapel was constructed in 1862 by Fr. Francisco Ceballos, SJ situated near the Aquada River. In 1881, the mission chapel of the Jesuits located between the Fort Isabela II and the shore saw growth in number of Christian adherents. It was dedicated to Saint Elizabeth of Portugal, in relation to the naming of the nearby fort in honor of Queen Isabella II of Spain.

The earthquake of September 21, 1897 and its resulting destructions prompted to relocate the church site to its present location in Barangay Seaside. Before the fire of March 30, 1962, the church of Isabela was made of wood for its lateral walls and galvanized iron for its roofing. The said fire resulted to the construction of the present cathedral. On October 12, 1963, the Territorial Prelature of Isabela was founded with its territories carved from that of Archdiocese of Zamboanga.

Bishop José María Querejeta Mendizábal, C.M.F., the prelature's first bishop-prelate, was installed on February 15, 1964 and in the same year, he spearheaded the construction of the present cathedral. The finished cathedral church was consecrated in June 1970 and occupies an area of 1,100 square metres (12,000 sq ft). The façade of the church features brise soleil installations. Stained glass windows are placed at the upper center of the church façade and along the cathedral's lateral walls. The sanctuary is host to a large mosaic of Christ flanked by six apostles in each side which was imported from Italy.

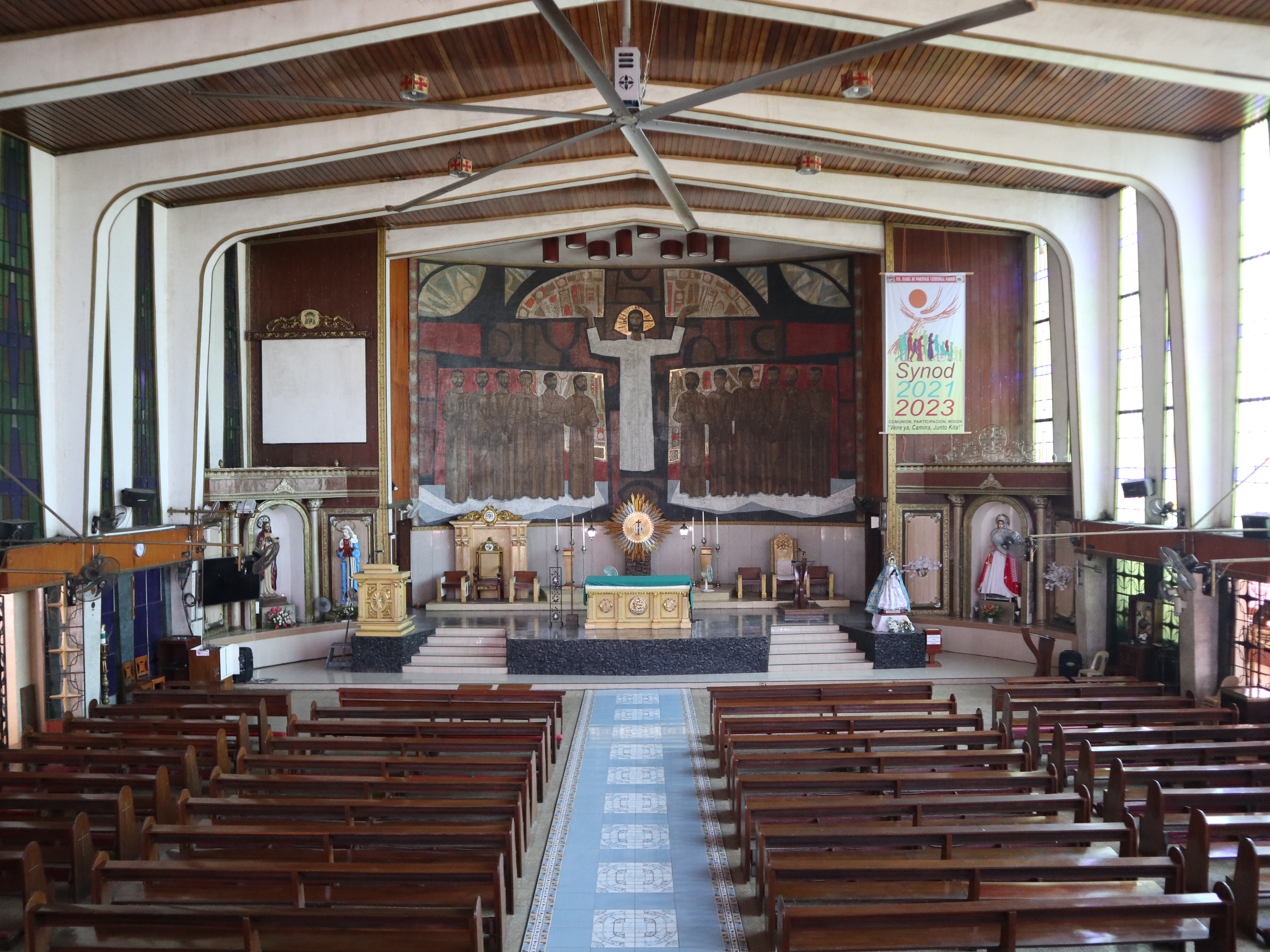
Cathedral interior in 2023

On April 13, 2010, three bomb explosions jolted Isabela that caused at least 11 casualties. One of those bombs exploded near the cathedral. The said explosion partly damaged the cathedral's façade and its stained glass windows. Parish offices were added to the edifice's second floor during the repair of the damages a year after.
