= Antonieto Cabajog =

Filipino bishop

The Most Reverend Antonieto Cabajog
- Bishop of Surigao
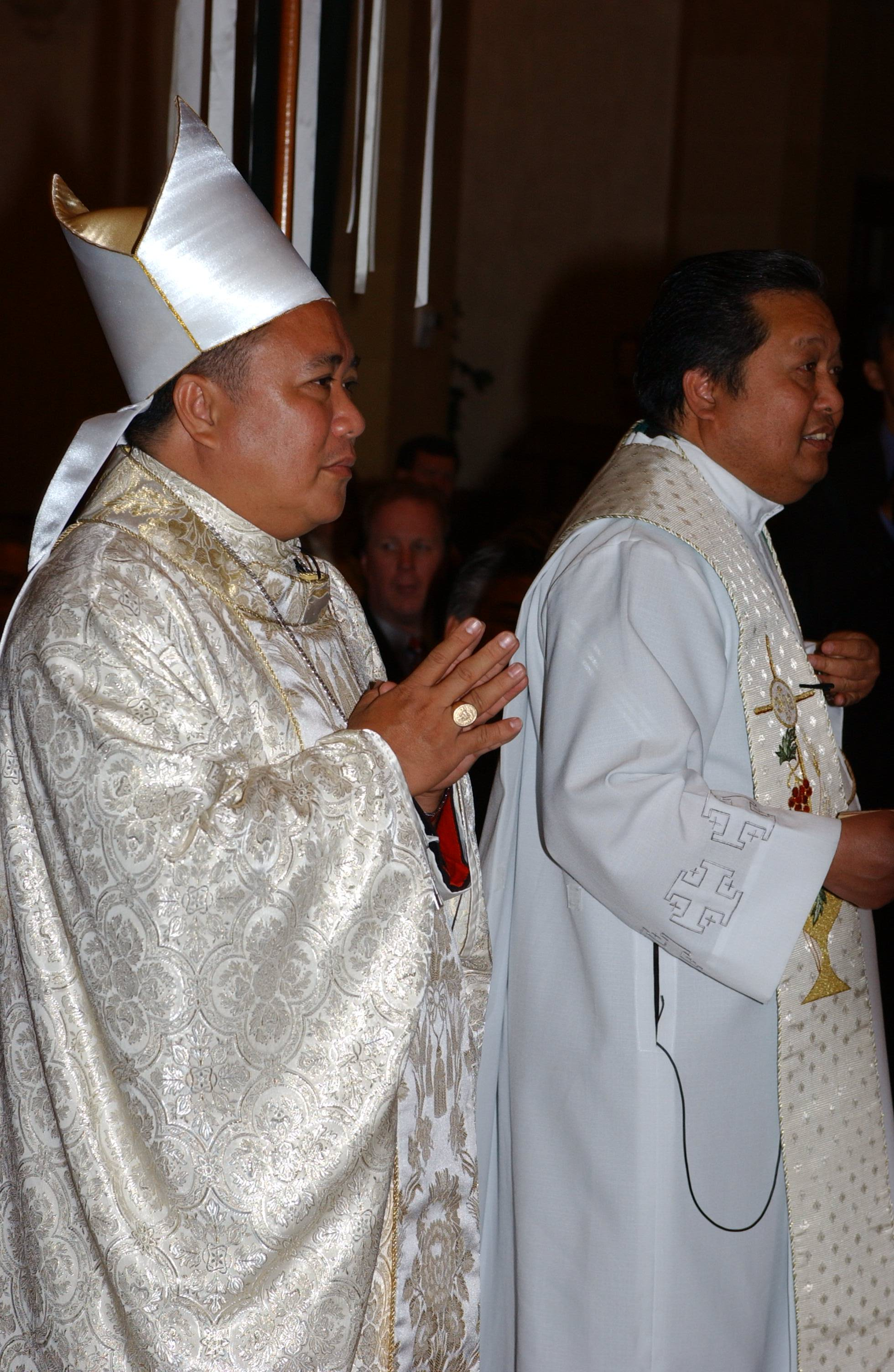
- See: Diocese of Surigao
- In office: 2001 — present
- Predecessor: Miguel C. Cinches, S.V.D.
- Successor: incumbent
- Previous post: Auxiliary Bishop of Cebu

Orders
- Ordination: 9 April 1981 by Onesimo Cadiz Gordoncillo
- Consecration: 13 January 1999 by Ricardo Vidal

Personal details
- Born: May 10, 1956 (age 70) Cebu City, Cebu, Philippines
- Denomination: Roman Catholic
- Coat of arms

Antonieto Dumagan Cabajog (born May 10, 1956), often known as Bishop Yiet or Monsignor Yiet, is a Filipino Roman Catholic bishop from Bohol, Philippines, as of 2001 bishop of Surigao.

He was ordained to the priesthood on April 9, 1981, at the Church of the Holy Trinity, Loay, Bohol. His episcopal ordination was on March 16, 1999, at the age of 43 at the Cathedral of St. Joseph the Worker in Tagbilaran City, Philippines.

== Biography ==
=== Early life ===
Monsignor Antonieto Cabajog was born on May 10, 1956, in Cebu City, Philippines to Fortunato "Tantoy" Cabajog of Botoc, Loay, Bohol and Agripina "Fannie" Dumagan of neighboring Santa Felomina, Alburquerque, Bohol. He has one sister, Madelon Cabajog Blanes, now married to Cres Blanes, and is a doctor of medicine by profession. Both children grew up in Botoc, Loay, Bohol.

=== Education ===
==== Secondary education ====
- 1969-1973: Immaculate Heart of Mary Seminary in Taloto District, Tagbilaran City

==== Higher education ====
- 1973-1977: Philosophy - Faculty of Philosophy, University of Santo Tomas in España, Sampaloc, Manila
- 1977-1980: Theology - Faculty of Theology, University of Santo Tomas
- 1980-1981: Canon Law - Faculty of Canon Law, University of Santo Tomas
- 1983-1986: Canon Law - Faculty of Canon Law, Pontifical University of St. Thomas Aquinas (Angelicum) in Rome, Italy

=== Degrees ===
- Bachelor of Arts (A.B.) from Faculty of Philosophy, University of Santo Tomas (Manila)
- Bachelor of Philosophy (Ph.B.), Faculty of Philosophy, University of Santo Tomas (Manila)
- Licentiate of Philosophy (Ph.L.), Faculty of Philosophy, University of Santo Tomas (Manila)
- Bachelor of Theology (S.T.B), Faculty of Theology, University of Santo Tomas (Manila)
- Licentiate of Canon Law (J.C.L.), Faculty of Canon Law, University of Santo Tomas (Manila)
- Doctor of Canon Law (J.C.D.), Pontifical University of St. Thomas Aquinas (Angelicum), Rome, Italy

== Ministry ==
- 1981-1983 Spiritual Director, Immaculate Heart of Mary Seminary (College Dept.), Tagbilaran City
- Professor, Immaculate Heart of Mary Seminary, (College/High School), Tagbilaran City
- 1986-1990 Secretary to the Bishop
- Chaplain, Mother Butler Mission Guild
- 1987-1988 Diocesan Economus
- 1987-1990 Member, Diocesan Economic Council
- 1988-1990 Diocesan Chancellor
- Member, Board of Consultors
- Chaplain, Cursillo de Cristianidad
- 1989-1990 Associate Judicial Vicar, Diocesan Tribunal
- 1990-1993 CBCP Assistant Treasurer
- 1990-1994 CBCP Assistant Secretary General
- Defender of the Bond, National Appellate Matrimonial Tribunal
- 1991-1994 Professor, UST Faculty of Canon Law
- 1992-1994 Member, CBCP Budget & Finance Office
- 1993 Judge, National Appellate Matrimonial Tribunal
- Member, Nat'l. Permanent Committee for Int'l. Eucharistic Congresses
- Member, Canon Law Society of the Philippines
- 1993-1994 CBCP Acting Treasurer
- 1994 Judicial Vicar, Diocesan Tribunal
- Diocesan Economus
- Chaplain, Mother Butler Mission Guild
- 1994-1996 Corporate Secretary, Bohol Heritage Foundation
- Member, Diocesan Personnel Board
- Spiritual Director, Immaculate Heart of Mary Seminary (College Dept.)
- Diocesan Chancellor
- Chaplain, Cursillo de Cristianidad
- 1996-1997 Parish Priest, St. Augustine Parish, Panglao, Bohol
- 1997-1999 Parish Priest, Cathedral of St. Joseph the Worker, Tagbilaran City
- January 13, 1999, Appointed Auxiliary Bishop of Cebu
- July 24, 2001, Appointed Bishop of Surigao

== See also ==
- Paring Bol-anon
- Immaculate Heart of Mary Seminary
- Diocese of Tagbilaran
- List of notable alumni of the Immaculate Heart of Mary Seminary
