= List of Boholano writers =

Writers from the island of Bohol

There are hundreds of published Boholano writers (or Bol-anon writers) from the time Boholano literature emerged since the time of Boholano priestess Karyapa before the arrival of the Spaniards. The following list of Boholano writers is not extensive nor comprehensive enough to be considered a directory.

Several groups were formed like Bahandi Writers of Loon, Bohol, Kaliwat ni Karyapa formed on September 8, 2000 and Society of Active Boholano Artists and Writers.

Also named in the list are the late president of the Republic of the Philippines Carlos P. Garcia who wrote Visayan poems, Palanca awardees Marjorie Evasco, Noel P. Tuazon, and Clovis Nazareno and the Boholano dean of journalism the late Zoilo Dejaresco.

== List of Boholano writers ==
This is a partial, alphabetical list of Boholano writers who lived or are living in the Philippines and other countries. The town and/or province where the writer was born or is currently residing is indicated in parentheses after his/her name. Overseas writers temporarily working or permanently residing abroad have their Philippine provinces of origin and/or adopted countries cited. The (†) symbol after a writer's name signifies that he/she is deceased.

- Erico B. Aumentado (Tagbilaran) (†)
- Marjorie Evasco (Maribojoc)
- Carlos P. Garcia (Talibon) (†)
- Jose Lacaba or (Pete Lacaba) (Loon)
- Emmanuel Lacaba (Loon) (Eman Lacaba) (†)
- Cecilio Putong (†)
- Lina Sagaral Reyes (Loay)(+)

== See also ==
- Cebuano literature
- GUMIL Filipinas
- Literature of the Philippines
