= Surigao Cathedral =

Roman Catholic church in Surigao del Norte, Philippines

- San Nicolas de Tolentino Cathedral
- Saint Nicholas of Tolentino Cathedral Parish
- Parokyang Katedral ni San Nicolas de Tolentino (Filipino)
- Cathedral facade in 2023

- Location in Mindanao Location in the Philippines
- 9°47′23″N 125°29′38″E
- Location: Surigao City, Surigao del Norte
- Country: Philippines
- Denomination: Roman Catholic

History
- Status: Cathedral
- Founded: 1754
- Dedication: Saint Nicholas of Tolentino
- Consecrated: 1763, 1939, 1988

Architecture
- Functional status: Active
- Architectural type: Church building
- Style: Modern

Administration
- Archdiocese: Cagayan de Oro
- Diocese: Surigao

Clergy
- Bishop: Antonieto Cabajog

San Nicolas de Tolentino Cathedral, commonly known as Surigao Cathedral, is a Roman Catholic cathedral located at Surigao City in the Philippines. It is the seat of the Diocese of Surigao.

== History ==
The present-day Surigao City traces its beginnings as an independent pueblo in June 1655. Its parish, dedicated to Nicholas of Tolentino, was founded in 1754 by the Augustinian Recollects. The center of the Catholic mission in the area was initially at Siargao island but was transferred to Surigao due to the Moro attacks in the island. To ease the administration of Mindanao, it was divided into six districts, one of which was the District of Surigao. The said district spanned from Caraga Bay to Butuan Bay. Its first capital was Tandag but was transferred to Surigao in 1751. The parish of Surigao was administered by the secular priests in the first half of the 19th-century while the century's latter half was divided among the Augustinian Recollects and the Jesuits. After the earlier two orders, the Benedictine fathers took over the area at the time when the Surigao province was formally founded in 1901, with Surigao as the capital town. In 1939, the Diocese of Surigao was canonically erected from the Diocese of Cagayan de Oro's territory, with the Saint Nicholas of Tolentino Parish Church being consecrated as its diocesan seat. The bombings during the World War II destroyed the earlier cathedral church, including its records and the adjacent Saint Paul University Surigao buildings, but was later rebuilt in 1988 under the supervision of the Missionaries of the Sacred Heart.
