= Diocese of Surigao =

Latin Catholic diocese in the Philippines

Diocese of Surigao Dioecesis Surigensis Diyosesis sa Surigao Diyosesis ng Surigao

Catholic
- Surigao Cathedral

- Coat of arms

Location
- Country: Philippines
- Territory: Provinces of Surigao del Norte and Dinagat Islands
- Ecclesiastical province: Cagayan de Oro
- Metropolitan: Cagayan de Oro
- Coordinates: 9°47′24″N 125°29′38″E

Statistics
- Area: 3,739 km^{2} (1,444 sq mi)
- Population: Total; Catholics: (as of 2021); 601,000; 505,000 (84.0%)
- Parishes: 32

Information
- Denomination: Catholic Church
- Sui iuris church: Latin Church
- Rite: Roman Rite
- Established: June 3, 1939
- Cathedral: Cathedral of San Nicholas of Tolentino
- Patron saint: Nicholas of Tolentino
- Secular priests: 41

Current leadership
- Pope: Leo XIV
- Bishop: Antonieto Cabajog
- Metropolitan Archbishop: José A. Cabantan
- Vicar General: Tirso N. Alcala
- Episcopal Vicars: Prescilo P. Iral

The Diocese of Surigao (Lat: Dioecesis Surigensis) is a diocese of the Latin Church of the Catholic Church in the Philippines.

Erected in 1939, the diocese is one of the older ecclesiastical territories in the Philippines. The diocese was split off from the Archdiocese of Cagayan de Oro. In 1978, the diocese was subdivided, and the Diocese of Tandag was split off.

The diocese is a suffragan of the Archdiocese of Cagayan de Oro.

The current bishop is Antonieto Dumagan Cabajog, who was appointed on July 24, 2001.

The jurisdiction of this diocese is the provinces of Surigao del Norte and Dinagat Islands.

== Coat of arms ==
These arms show in the chief a star for Saint Nicholas of Tolentiono, the patron saint of the diocese. The three golden balls are Spanish doubloons and refer to the richness of the area, as there have been some gold mines in the diocese. The base shows a fishing boat, referring to the main source of income for the area.

== Ordinaries ==
No	Name	In office	Coat of arms
1.	Jan Vrakking, M.S.C.†	May 25, 1940 – December 12, 1953	
2.	Charles van den Ouwelant, M.S.C. †	March 23, 1955 – 10 January 10, 1973	
3.	Miguel Cinches, S.V.D.	January 10, 1973 appointed – April 21, 2001	
4.	Antonieto Cabajog	April 21, 2001 – present	

== See also ==
- Catholic Church in the Philippines
