= Miguel Cinches =

Filipino Roman Catholic bishop

Miguel Clarete Cinches S.V.D.
- Bishop of Surigao
- Church: Catholic Church
- Diocese: Diocese of Surigao
- In office: 10 January 1973 – 21 April 2001
- Predecessor: Charles Van den Ouwelant
- Successor: Antonieto Cabajog

Orders
- Ordination: 22 October 1961
- Consecration: 24 March 1973 by Carmine Rocco

Personal details
- Born: 7 February 1932 Dauis, Bohol, Insular Government of the Philippine Islands, United States
- Died: 12 April 2010 (aged 78)

Miguel Cinches (7 February 1932 – 12 April 2010) was the Roman Catholic bishop of the Roman Catholic Diocese of Surigao, Philippines.

Ordained to the priesthood on 22 October 1961, Cinches was named bishop on 10 January 1973, and was ordained on 24 March 1973, resigning on 21 April 2001.
