= Immaculate Heart of Mary Seminary =

Coordinates: 9°40′21.18″N 123°51′18.05″E

- Motto: Pietas Scientia Sanctitas ("Piety, Science, Holiness")
- Type: Diocesan, Roman Catholic Seminary
- Established: 1950
- Affiliations: CEAP, BACS
- Rector: Rev. Fr. Absalon Florenosos
- Undergraduates: Approx.
- Postgraduates: Approx.
- Location: Tagbilaran City, Bohol, Philippines
- Campus: 1
- Alma Mater Song: I.H.M.S., We love you
- Nickname: IHMS, ayeychemes

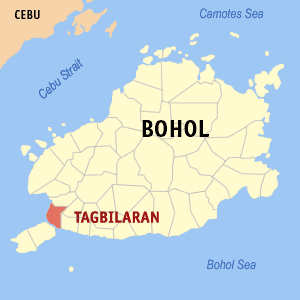
Tagbilaran City, Bohol

The Immaculate Heart of Mary Seminary (IHMS) is a diocesan college seminary, located in Taloto, Tagbilaran City, Bohol, Philippines.

== Overview ==
The seminary was established in 1950 by Julio Rosales, Bishop of Tagbilaran, in implementation of Canon 1354, no. 2 of the 1917 Code of Canon Law.

It was first administered by the Divine Word Missionaries for a contract period of 10 years. IHMS has educated hundreds of diocesan and religious priests as well as lay alumni that served in different capacities in the Philippines and abroad.

== History ==
On August 22, 1948, the cornerstone of the Immaculate Heart of Mary Seminary was laid down, coinciding with the Feast of the Immaculate Heart of Mary. By July 16, 1949, the pillars of the building were constructed, and in 1950, the Immaculate Heart of Mary Minor Seminary was officially founded. In 1960, the diocesan clergy took over administration from the SVD, and the following year, the college department was opened. The minor seminary was gradually phased out in 1989. The seminary celebrated its 40th anniversary in 1990. On August 22, 2000, the Golden Jubilee was commemorated with the theme "Mary and the Priesthood and Evangelization." In June 2010, the Minor Seminary (High School Department) was reopened

== Administration ==
Rectors of the
Immaculate Heart of Mary Seminary
Rev. Alphonse M. Mildner, SVD, 1950 – 1954

Rev. Fr. William Van Kuijik, SVD, 1954-1960

Fr. Pelagio Dompor †, 1960–1972
Fr. Fernandez †, 1972 – 1979
Fr. Zacharias Jimenez, 1979-1983
Fr. Clarito Rara, 1983-1984
Most. Rev. Onesimo Gordoncillo, 1984-1985
Fr. Alfredo Baquial, 1985-1988
Fr. Bernardo Rañoa, 1988-1989; 1991-1994
Fr. Cirilo Darunday, 1989-1991
Fr. Avelino Vale, 1994-2000
Fr. Victor Bompat, 2000-2001
Fr. Martin Lupiba, 2001-2009
Fr. Crisolito Geangan 2009-2012
Fr. Jose Ramon Oncog, 2012-2016
Fr. Valentino Pinlac, 2016-2018
Msgr. Harold Parilla, 2018-2021

Fr. Absalon Florenosos, 2021-2025

Msgr. Efren Bongay, 2025-Present

- Rector – Rev. Fr. Absalon B. Florenosos MA
- Procurator – Rev. Fr. Garry Nathaniel G. Guiritan MTH
- Prefect of Discipline Discipleship Stage– Rev. Fr. Rommel H. Anico MA
- Spiritual Director Discipleship Stage – Rev. Fr. Bernadine Jade Dionne V. Balite MAPM
- Academic Dean Discipleship Stage – Rev. Fr. Jose Zeno Vincent O. Gucor MAT
- Prefect of Discipline Propaedeutic Department – Rev. Fr. Rey Carlo P. Sajulan RN
- Spiritual Director Propaedeutic Department - Rev. Fr. Expedito G. Rubio Jr. MA
- Prefect of Discipline High School Department – Rev. Fr. Christian Josua G. Florenosos MFMC
- Spiritual Director High School Department - Rev. Fr. Garry Nathaniel G. Guiritan MTH
- Registrar – Mrs. Bernadette Aguillo
- Cashier – Ms. Merce Lysa R. Balijon
- Disbursing Officer - Mr. Eusebio Varquez
- Bookkeeper - Mrs. Zoila E. Jimenez
- Music Director – Rev. Fr. Bernadine Jade Dionne V. Balite MAPM
- Principal High School Department – Mrs. Maria Annalissa J. Babera PhD

== Traditions ==
=== Escudo or escutcheon ===
The Escudo or Escutcheon

The shield, called escudo or escutcheon of the Immaculate Heart of Mary Seminary, its history and meaning was drafted by Bernard Fuertes. It was drawn and finalized by popular Tagbilaran artists, Ric Ramasola and Tony Arat in 1961.

The escudo or escutcheon has five (5) major elements. The "base" represents God's omnipotent power and grace protecting or shielding Mary from original sin– represented by the monogram "M". The "Flaming Heart" represents Mary's loving and maternal concern for the seminarians and professors of the seminary. It is surrounded by "Twelve Stars" -- adapted from her appearance to St. Bernadette of Lourdes in France telling her that "I am the Immaculate Conception," hence the title, Immaculate Heart of Mary, is adopted. Over the "escudo" is an open book representing the search for knowledge by the seminarians through diligent studies. It is highlighted by the "Burning Torch" representing the "lumen Christi," or the light of Christ, which is always given to those who earnestly seek for knowledge and truth.

The search for knowledge goes along with the cultivation of the following good habits (other authors call them virtues) that an IHM seminarian should endeavor to ultimately internalize such as Pietas or Piety means the habit or virtue of rendering respect and obedience not only to God's commandment and those of the Church but also to the laws of the State. Further, it means giving due respect and honor to both religious and civil superiors. Piety must be founded on the virtue of humility, without which the former would be nigh, impossible to achieve.

Scientia or Science, especially divine science, is the result of a continuous search for knowledge under the aid of divine guidance; Sanctitas or Holiness is a virtue that is a must for all, most especially for seminarians and God's ministers. According to traditional theology, it is a habit of not being involved too much in worldly affairs, although in reality living in the world. It corresponds to the pursuit of knowledge. The more unworldly have attained a higher degree of science and sanctity. That is why St. Thomas Aquinas is called the "Angelic Doctor" because he attained the highest degree of these virtues. He is thereby honored by the Church and made the Patron of Catholic schools.

The year 1950 represents the seminary's year of foundation by Bishop Julio Rosales of the Diocese of Tagbilaran. The circlets at the base of the monogram of Mary and at the bottom of the "escudo" is an abstract or idealistic representation of the Society of the Divine Word (Societas Verbum Divini) or SVD whose fathers managed the seminary for the first 10 years of its existence under the first set of professors with Rev. Alphonse M. Mildner, SVD as Rector, together with Fr. Simeon O. Valerio (ret. Bishop of Calapan, Or. Mindoro), Fr. Victor Drewes and Fr. Victor Tunkel.

=== St. Joseph Vocation Society (SJVS) ===
The St. Joseph Vocation Society or SJVS is a scholarship foundation of the Diocese of Tagbilaran and IHMS. It was established in 1960 by Fr. Felix S. Zafra to support poor but deserving seminarians. Through the years, SJVS has sent many seminarians to the seminary who were ordained priests. Most of the Paring Bol-anon have received SJVS support. Funds come mainly from ordinary people through yearly house-to-house campaign by the seminarians. In 1989, SJVS launched a one-million-peso fund campaign. The Paring Bol-anon responded to the appeal. About two-thirds of the funds have been collected. In the United States, the proceeds of PB-USA Reunion dinners and concerts all go to the trust fund. Every year, the whole Paring Bol-anon offer masses for the intentions of SJVS benefactors and donors.

=== Music of the Jeduthun ensemble ===
The Jeduthun Ensemble is the Schola Cantorum or the official choir of IHMS. Conducted by a priest Music Director, the Jeduthun serves as the backbone of all choral singing within the bounds of the seminary and its traditional yearly concert performed in the capital city for the local community. From in-house performances to town fiesta gigs, the Jeduthun Ensemble's reputation as a solid, high-quality, well-arranged, and conducted choral group has easily landed them, in the past, invitations to perform in other venues outside of Bohol, like Manila, Iloilo, Dumaguete and Mindanao. The IHMS' musical practices and tradition has been the seedbed of many musical successes among its alumni in the field of music, like the pioneering acts of the ABCD Quartet of the '60s, the celebrated Singing Priests of San Francisco in mid '80s, the well-choreographed Singing Priests of Louisiana in late '80s, and the high-powered Singing Priests of Tagbilaran (SPOT) in the late '90s. IHMS has also produced many prolific songwriters whom have won honors in different songwriters' competitions outside the seminary, while some others have even chosen the field of music as their field of profession and livelihood.

To date, Jeduthun Ensemble alumni have been in varying degrees a continuing presence in the field of music locally and internationally. While some have made it in the music business (see Jimmy Borja, Arnold Zamora), many of its priest-products (see Paring Bol-anon) have also demonstrated as much propensity in their musical pursuit as artists and producers in their respective rights. Like the pioneering Singing Priests of San Francisco, who released the first ever studio-recorded Paring Bol-anon albums, Inspirational Songs (1985) and Christmas in San Francisco (1986), it did not take long for others PBs to follow suit. In 1993, Fr. Roland Pacudan released 2 musical albums of original works in Hawaii with Citizens of the World and Roads of Life (1994).Fr. Roland Pacudan authored three books, one in 2009 entitled "Secundum Ordinem Vitae and two in 2010 entitled "Ego Sum Qui Sum and "Ordo Ab Chao". While in New Orleans, Fr. J. Roel Lungay produced four compilations of original songs written by him, and with other PBs like Frs. TQ Solis, Jr. Elpidio Biliran, Jr. and Arnold Zamora, with Mass of St. Rita (1993), Dear Jesus (1994), Music Revisited, Vol. 1 (1995) and One Heart, One Mind (1996). In 1998, spearheaded by nationally known composer and arranger, Fr. Arnold Zamora, the Singing Priests of Tagbilaran released their self-titled CD, SPOT, in San Francisco, while another longtime PB, in that same year, Msgr. Floro Arcamo, also of San Francisco, with the help of long-time confrere, Fr. Rolando Caverte, and Suzanne St. John, released, too, his debut solo album of cover songs titled, Songs of Faith And Inspiration (1998). These and all others truly highlight the musical achievements of Paring Bol-anons as well as other IHMS students which had its lowly beginning as alumni of the old Jeduthun Ensemble.

==== Jeduthun concerts and plays ====
- Sons of Jeduthun, IHMS Silver Jubilee Celebration 1975, Bohol Cultural Center
- Kura sa Cogon, IHMS Auditorium and selected Bohol municipalities, 1977
- Jeduthun Ensemble, Bohol and Mindanao Tour, 1978
- Jeduthun in Concert, Divine Word College of Tagbilaran and selected Bohol municipalities, 1979
- Confido in Domino, Divine Word College of Tagbilaran Gymnasium, January 21-23, 1983
- Ite Missa Est
- Eukaristikon , Divine Word College of Tagbilaran. 1987
- The New Generation of Jeduthun, February, 1987, in commemoration of the first anniversary of the People Power EDSA Revolution
- Jeduthun Ensemble in Concert, a town-to-town Concert Tour in Bohol province and including one in Davao City, 1988
- IHMS Ruby Jubilee Concert, IHMS Auditorium, 1990
- Everlasting Light, Divine Word College of Tagbilaran Gymnasium, 1996
- Hiusatlo, Divine Word College of Tagbilaran Gymnasium, 1997
- Jubilaeum 2000 - IHMS Golden Jubilee Concert, Divine Word College of Tagbilaran Gymnasium, 2000

=== Lagdâ sa Pamuyô ===
The Lagdâ sa Pamuyô, literally translated as "Handbook of Rules", contains the rules of discipline that prescribe the do's and don't's in the Immaculate Heart of Mary Seminary, or what should and should not be done.

=== Vocation tour ===
Vocation tour was an annual 3-day tour around the Province of Bohol during the late 1970s. All the seminarians, both high school and college, together with the faculty-priests, are divided into 3 or 4 groups with each group assigned specific towns/municipalities to visit. The entire province is covered during the tour. The parish priest would host one group and would schedule them to visit the different parochial and public schools in the town. There the seminarians would talk about life in the seminary and render a presentation to the students, inviting them to enter the seminary.

=== Summer apostolate ===
The Summer Apostolate is part of the formation of seminarians that will allow them to engage in real-life apostolate work. It is usually held from April to May each year. It is during this period that the college seminarians are assigned to work in the different towns/municipalities of Bohol under the guidance of the Parish Priest.

=== Paring Bol-anon ===
See: List of IHMS alumni Paring Bol-anon

logo of the Paring Bol-anon

The Paring Bol-anon or the Bohol Clergy is the fraternity of Roman Catholic priests who come from Bohol, Philippines, the majority of whom are currently serving in the parishes of the two dioceses in Bohol, namely, the Diocese of Tagbilaran and the Diocese of Talibon, while a good number of them are also serving outside the province, most notably Manila, Mindanao and the United States, either as bishops, chaplains, pastors or guest priests.

=== Bohol Major Seminarians ===
In the mid 1970s IHMS alumni who moved on to the different major theological schools for their final priestly formation began organizing themselves into a group where they can represent and speak for themselves on issues affecting the seminarians and students aspiring to become priests one day. This led to the birth of the official organization of seminarians called the Bohol Major Seminarians. The BMS eventually splintered into smaller groups, depending on what area of the Philippines they pursued further studies: BMS-Tagbilaran, BMS-Cebu, BMS-Mindanao and BMS-Manila. Eventually the BMS proved to be the catalyst that sparked the transformation of the Diocese of Tagbilaran and its clergy as well as the official founding of the Paring Bol-anon as a priestly fraternity in 1979 in a synod-like assembly of clergy that issued the first ever Diocesan Thrust.

- BMS-Tagbilaran - College seminarians studying at IHMS
- BMS-Cebu - Theology students studying at Seminario Mayor de San Carlos
- BMS-Manila - Theology students studying at UST Pontifical Seminary, San Jose Major Seminary (Ateneo) and at Tagaytay seminaries (MSP, SASMA, DWS)
- BMS-Mindanao - Theology students studying at any Mindanao seminaries (REMASE, DIOPEM, St. John Vianney)

=== Alumni associations ===
Also See:List of notable alumni of the Immaculate Heart of Mary Seminary

- Paring Bol-anon - The association of Boholano priests based in different locations.
- BANGKÂ - (Bol-anon Alang sa Nagkahiusang Katuyuan) the alumni association based in Manila was organized and registered with the SEC in the mid 1990s with Atty Mannix Cimafranca as the President.
- TIPASÎ - originally Tagbilaran Integration of ex-Priests And ex-Seminarians Inc., the alumni association based in Tagbilaran City. It was organized in 1986 with Timmy Balane as interim president.
  - TIPASÎ-Tagbilaran -– the alumni association based in Tagbilaran City with Ariel Dominquez as president in 2006.
  - TIPASÎ-Talibon - the alumni association based in Talibon with Palug Logroño as president in 2006.
  - TIPASÎ-Cebu - the alumni association based in Cebu City with Atty. Aquilino Felicitas as president in 2006.
  - Charlatans - coined by former Rector, now Bishop, Zacharias C. Jimenez for the freshman class of 1976, College Department
  - Baboga - or, Baston Bobits Gang, name adopted by the HS Batch '80 for their class;
  - Hoi Polloi Society - 1999

== Publications ==
Image of ISDA Pahayagan Logo

- Our Seminary - School Yearbook (also known as Annual)
- Legité - The official college newsletter
- Sal Terrae - The official high school newsletter
- Precis - The official prayer and song book of the seminary
- ISDÂ Pahayagan - The official newsletter of the Paring Bol-anon all over the world. "The Paring Bol-anon is ISDA; ISDA is the Paring Bol-anon." (Fr. Vicente Nunag, III, Ulo Sa Isda, ISDA, July 1993 Issue)
- Scriptum - The unofficial and unauthorized newsletter of the IHMS Batch HS '80 and College '84
- The Heart of Ayeychemes - an anthology of experiences in the '70s and '80s, fragments of thoughts and reflections, tributes and others, written by a group of alumni.

== Gallery ==
View of the IHMS High School Bldg

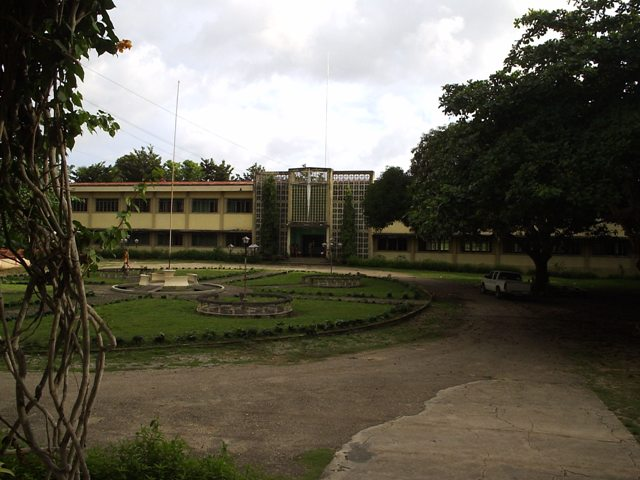
view of the High School Building from the College

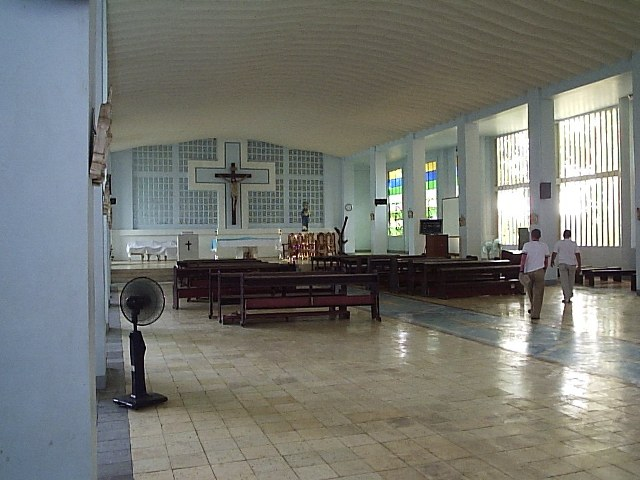
The Chapel of the Immaculate Heart of Mary Seminary

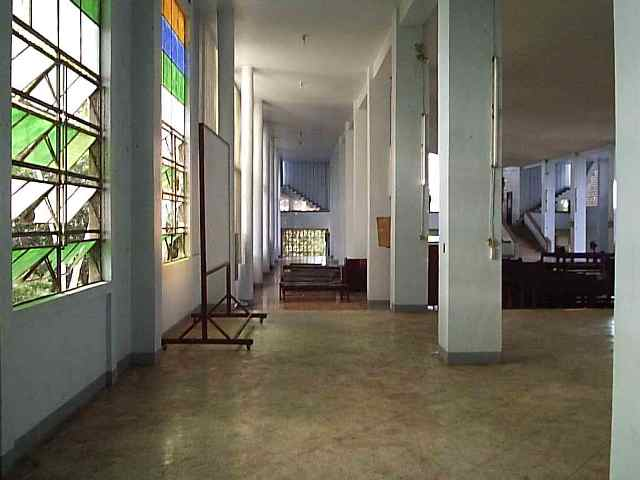
IHMS Chapel

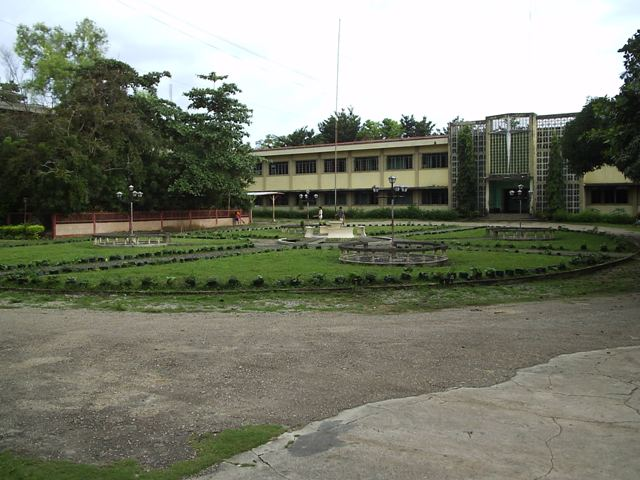
view of the Rotunda from the College Building

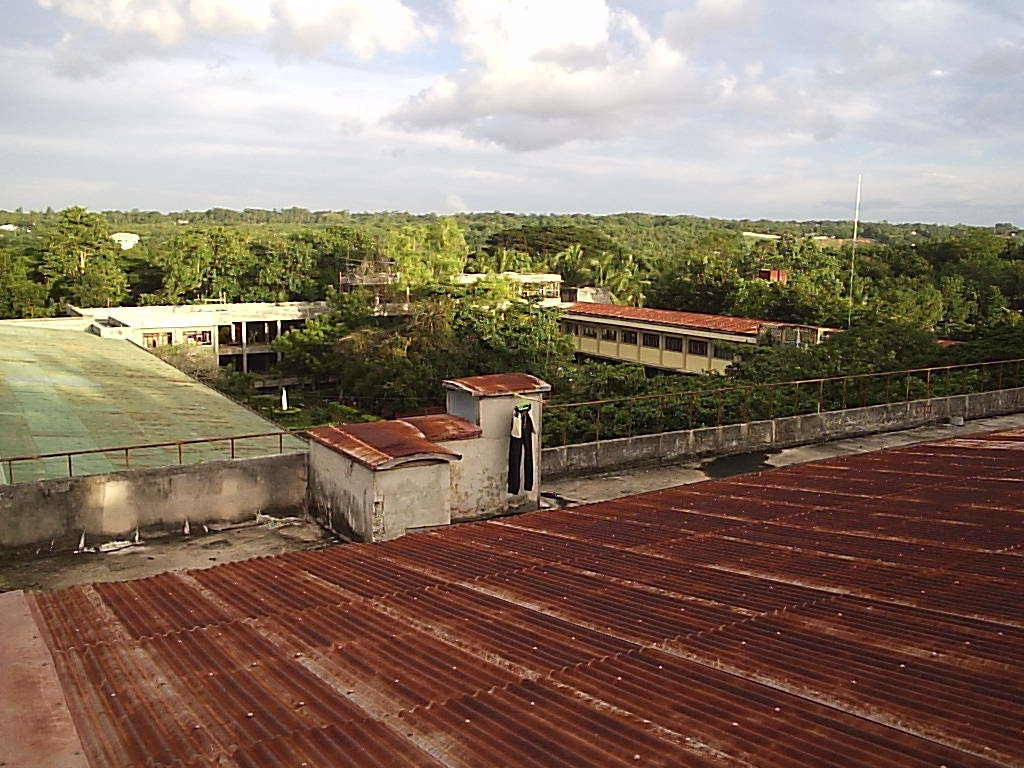
Roof Garden

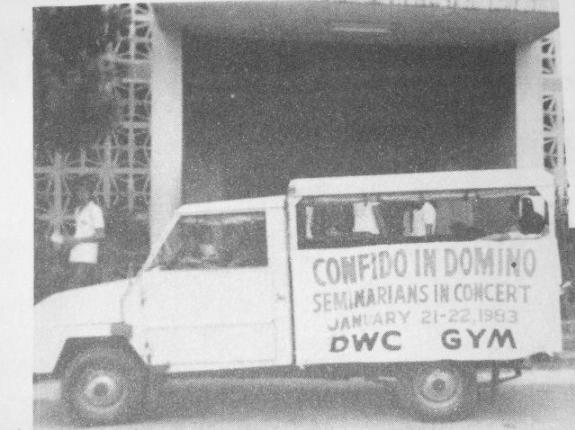
Confido in Domino Concert mobile publicity

== See also ==
- List of alumni of the Immaculate Heart of Mary Seminary
- Paring Bol-anon
- Diocese of Tagbilaran
- Diocese of Talibon
