= HNU College of Law =

University in the Philippines

Coordinates: 9°38′57.21″N 123°52′38.58″E

Holy Name University College of Law
- Motto: Benedicite Nomini Eius
- Motto in English: "Blessed be His Name"
- Academic affiliations: PALS
- Dean: ATomas D. Abapo
- Location: Bates Building, Dampas Campus, Dampas District, Tagbilaran, Bohol, Philippines
- Website: www.hnu.edu.ph

Holy Name University College of Law or HNU-COL is a department of the Holy Name University, formerly Divine Word College of Tagbilaran (DWC-T), an institution of higher learning, located in Tagbilaran, Bohol, Philippines. The College offers a Baccalaureate course leading to the degree of Bachelor of Laws or LLB. The degree is preparatory to taking the Philippine Bar Examination every September.

Its Law course is under the supervision of the Supreme Court of the Philippines and the Commission on Higher Education (Philippines) (CHED). It is also a member of the Philippine Association of Law Schools (PALS).

== Milestones ==
The HNU College of Law garnered another golden harvest or milestone as nine (9) graduates passed the 2011 Bar Examinations. Eight (8) of twelve (12) or 66.67% of its May 2011 graduates hurdled the said exam, the University's highest passing percentage in the Bar Exams in recent years. The new lawyers will take their Oath on March 21, 2012 at the Philippine International Convention Center in Pasay, Metro Manila.

== People ==
=== Administration ===
- Dean: Dean Tomas D. Abapo, Jr.
- Secretary: Ms. Mary Joyce M. Gonzales

=== Faculty ===
- Tomas D. Abapo, Jr., Ll.B. (DWC-T)
- Lindecita C. Arcamo, A.B., Ll.B. (DWC-T)
- Cristifil D. Baluma, B.S.A., Ll.B. (HNU)
- Teofilo D. Baluma, A.B., Ll.B. (DWC-T)
- Danilo A. Bantugan, A.B., Ll.B., M.P.A. (HNU)
- Mitchell John L. Boiser, A.B., Ll.B. (HNU)
- Carlo Brian S. Carandang, Ll.B. (HNU)
- Maria Evaneliza Cloma-Lucero, Ll.B. (DWC-T)
- Adolfo M. Doroy, Ll.B. (HNU)
- Warren B. Yap, Jr., B.S.A., Ll.B. (HNU)
- Patsita Sarmiento-Gamutan
- Adam Relson L. Jala, Ll.B. (Ateneo de Manila)
- Maria Asuncion A. Jalad, M.D.
- Leo M. Lison
- Irma Zita V. Masamayor
- Olivia Mende, A.B., Ll.B. (DWC-T)
- Neil Eric E. Ochoco, B.S.A., Ll.B. (HNU)
- Rene Paredes, Ll.B. (DWC-T)
- Doni D. Piquero, A.B., Ll.B. (DWC-T)
- John Titus J. Vistal, B.S.A., Ll.B.(DWC-T)
- Licelle D. Zamora, B.S.A., Ll.B.(HNU)
- Pablo Magdoza, Ll.B (DWC-T)

== Notable alumni ==
- Edgar Migrino Chatto—Governor of Bohol
- Roberto C. Cajes—former Congressman
- Eladio Manliguez Jala—SEC Commissioner
