= List of alumni of the Immaculate Heart of Mary Seminary =

The college departments and former high school of the Immaculate Heart of Mary Seminary in Tagbilaran City, Bohol, Philippines have graduate notable people, including priests and pastors, missionaries, and lay people in politics, academia, music and arts, medicine, and the private and public sectors.

Below is a list of notable people affiliated with the Immaculate Heart of Mary Seminary including graduates, former students, and former professors.

== Bishops ==
- Msgr. Alfredo Bacquial † – former Auxiliary Bishop of the Archdiocese of Davao
- Msgr. Antonieto Dumagan Cabajog, D.D. – Bishop of the Diocese of Surigao
- Most Rev. Onesimo Gordoncillo, D.D. – Archbishop of the Archdiocese of Capiz
- Msgr. Zacarias Cenita Jimenez, D.D. – Bishop of the Diocese of Pagadian
- Msgr. Juan de Dios Mataflorida Pueblos, D.D. – Bishop of the Diocese of Butuan
- Most Rev. Jesus B. Tuquib, D.D. – Archbishop of Cagayan de Oro
- Msgr. Felix Zafra † – former Bishop of the Diocese of Tagbilaran
- Bishop Socrates "Soc" Mesiona, MSP – Apostolic Vicar of Puerto Princesa

== International diocesans ==
- Fr. Marino Aguhar – Houston, Texas, USA
- Fr. Edito Amora – USA
- Fr. Silvano Amora – New Jersey, USA
- Msgr. Floro Arcamo – Pastor, Star of the Sea Church, San Francisco, USA
- Fr. Arturo Auza – Tampa, Florida, USA
- Fr. Cromwell Cabrisos – Orlando, Florida, USA
- Fr. Faron Calumba – Hartford, USA
- Fr. Jesus Camacho – USA
- Fr. Joel Cantones – Pastor, St.John the Baptist Church, Edgard, Louisiana, USA
- Fr. Antonio Castro – Pastor, St. Hyacinth Catholic Church, Archdiocese of Galveston, Houston, Texas, USA
- Fr. Rolando Caverte – San Francisco, USA
- Fr. Rustico Centino – USA
- Fr. Alexander Concon – Chicago, Illinois, USA
- Fr. Felix Cubelo – Diocese of San Angelo, Texas, USA
- Fr. Manuel "Boboy" Curso – Pastor, Holy Angels Church Colma, California, USA
- Fr. Danilo Digal – Pastor, Our Lady of Prompt Succor, Chalmette, Louisiana, USA
- Fr. Malaquias Fuerzas – USA
- Fr. Evencio Gallego – Stockton, California, USA
- Fr. Bernardito Getigan – Holy Redeemer Church, Odessa, Texas, USA
- Fr. Floro Hinacay – Diocese of San Angelo, Texas, USA
- Fr. Joseph D. Lim – Chaplain, United States Air Force, Texas, USA
- Fr. Aurelio Luzon Jr. – Associate Pastor, Annunziata Parish, Houma, Louisiana, USA
- Fr. Roger Madrazo – Parish Priest, St. Francis de Sales Church, Marsh Harbour, Abaco, Bahamas; Archdiocese of Nassau
- Fr. Benito Manding – Pastor, Diocese of San Jose, California
- Fr. Florente Mendana – USA
- Fr. Gabriel Mission – Los Angeles
- Fr. Robustiano Morgia – Associate Pastor, St. Maria Goretti Church, New Orleans, Louisiana, USA
- Fr. Nilo Nalugon – Diocese of San Angelo, Texas, USA
- Fr. Alner Uy Nambatac – Associate Pastor, St. Hilary of Poitiers, Mathews, Louisiana, USA
- Fr. Ramon Jose Oncog – Diocese of Burlington, Vermont, USA
- Fr. Domingo Orimaco – Pastor, Our Lady of the Pillar Church Half Moon Bay, California, USA
- Fr. Roland Pacudan – composer of "IHMS, We Love You", the IHMS alma mater song; now based in Kailua, Hawaii, USA, and assigned to the Our Lady of Perpetual Help parish and St. Anthony de Padua Parish
- Fr. Jaime Parnada – USA
- Msgr. John Pernia – San Francisco, USA
- Fr. Arecio Pesquira – USA
- Fr. Fernando "Dodong" Po – Parochial Vicar, Church of St. Elizabeth, Wyckoff, New Jersey, USA
- Fr. Asiscio Podelino – Peterborough, Ontario, Canada
- Fr. Bernard Rañoa – Administrator, Sacred Heart Parish, Brawley, California, USA
- Fr. Clarito "Boy" Rara – Chaplain, Houston, Texas, USA
- Fr. Manuel Recera – Chicago, Illinois, USA
- Fr. Sabino "Ado" Rebosura, III – Morgan City, Louisiana USA
- Fr. Jovencio Ricafort – Pastor, Mater Dei Catholic Church, Chula Vista, California, USA
- Fr. Jonas Romea – USA
- Fr. Edwin Ruano – Orlando, Florida, USA
- Rev. Blair Lope M. Sabaricos – Associate Pastor, Our Lady of the Sacred Heart Church, Church Point, Louisiana, USA
- Fr. Leoncio Santiago – Chicago, Illinois, USA
- Fr. Fr. TQ Solis Jr. – Ocala, Florida, USA
- Fr. Hilario Soliva – New York City, USA
- Fr. Eugene D. Tungol – Pastor, Church of the Epiphany San Francisco, USA; chairman, Council of Priests, Archdiocese of San Francisco
- Fr. Vicente Tungol – Winnipeg, Manitoba, Canada
- Fr. Edwin Tutor – Associate Pastor, St. Charles Parish, South San Diego, Imperial Beach, San Diego, USA
- Fr. Avelino "Val" Vale – Associate Pastor, St. Michael Church, Crowley, Louisiana, USA
- Fr. Vicente Valles – Peterborough, Ontario, Canada
- Fr. Roque "Khing" Vaño – Pastor, San Diego, California, USA
- Fr. Toribio Villacastin – Flushing, New York, USA
- Fr. Arnold Zamora – Star of the Sea Parish, San Francisco, California, USA

== Local diocesan ==
- Fr. Juan Bosco "JB" Abellana † – Parochial Vicar, Holy Cross Parish (Amparo, Caloocan City) (2019-2021)
- Fr. Zenon Ampong – parish priest, Davao City
- Fr. Alger Angcla – parish priest, Loboc, Bohol
- Fr. Reuben "Daves" Angcla – parish priest, Our Lady of Mount Carmel Parish, Balilihan, Bohol
- Fr. Simplicio "Peon" Apalisok Jr. – former parish priest, Mount Carmel Parish, Project 6, Diocese of Cubao, Quezon City
- Fr. Andres "Andy" Ayco – parish priest, Tagbilaran City
- Fr. Jude Besinga – Chaplain, Camp Crame, Quezon City
- Fr. "Boy" Biliran – parish priest, Manila
- Fr. Joseph Biliran – parish priest, Diocese of Novaliches, Quezon City
- Fr. Celio Bomediano – Diocese of Dumaguete
- Fr. Presciano Boncales – Diocese of Talibon
- Fr. Jovilo "Jovil" Bongay – parish priest, Panacan, Davao City
- Fr. "Tiloy" Castino – Chaplain, Camp Crame, Quezon City
- Fr. Victor Emmanuel "Bobot" Clemen – Parish Priest, Santa Lucia Parish (Brgy. Santa Lucia, Novaliches, Quezon City) (2026-Present)
- Msgr. Cirilo Darunday Jr. – parish priest of Dao, Tagbilaran City
- Msgr. Pelagio Dompor † – first Rector of IHMS, Protonotary Apostolic, former Vicar-General of Tagbilaran City (deceased)
- Fr. Michael Gementiza – Archdiocese of Zamboanga
- Fr. Victor Gilay – parish priest, San Pedro Cathedral, Davao City
- Fr. Emmanuel "Bobong" Gonzaga – parish priest, Davao City
- Fr. Leonel Grado – parish priest, Catagbacan, Loon, Bohol
- Fr. Roger Madrazo – parish priest, St. Francis de Sales Church, Marsh Harbour, Abaco, Bahamas; Archdiocese of Nassau
- Msgr. Crisologo B. Manongas – Vicar General, Archdiocese of Zamboanga
- Fr. Jonathan Pacudan, younger brother of Roland, wrote the lyrics of the IHMS alma mater song; assigned to Our Lady of Consolation Parish, Guindulman, Bohol
- Fr. Emigdio "Migs" A. Paredes – chaplain, Veterans Memorial Medical Center, Quezon City
- Fr. Renato "Takyo" Regis – Catagbacan, Loon, Bohol
- Fr. Vic Valles – Archdiocese of Zamboanga
- Fr. Amado "Ding" Vaño – Archdiocese of Zamboanga
- Fr. Sixto Vistal – Archdiocese of Zamboanga

== Missionaries abroad ==
- Fr. Nilo Ingente, O.S.A. – Rome, Italy
- Fr. Gorgonio "Go" Llubit, M.S.P. – missionary to South Korea, Archdiocese of Seoul
- Fr. Eliseo "Loloy/Katiw" Napiere, M.S.P. – missionary to Taiwan, Diocese of Taichung: Migrants' Chaplain at Center for Migrants' Concerns – Central Taiwan

== Vatican diplomatic service ==
- Archbishop Bernardito "Barney" Auza – Vatican Ambassador to the United Nations, New York
- Msgr. Edward Karaan – Secretary, Apostolic Nunciature in Morocco

== CBCP ==
- Fr. Milan Ted Torralba – secretary-general of the Catholic Bishops Conference of the Philippines (CBCP); chairman of the Permanent Committee for the Cultural Heritage of the church

== Local religious orders ==
- Rev. Alphonse M. Mildner, SVD – first rector of IHMS (1950–1960); founder of the Divine Word College of Laoag in 1946
- Fr. Sisinio "Paddax" Paderog, OSA

== Private sector ==
- Luis Michael Abellana – Operations Manager, Metrobank, Las Pinas Branch, M.M.
- Charles N. Alferez – executive director, DCMI, Dipolog, Philippines
- Atty. Antonio "Jun" Amora Jr. – Provincial Administrator, Provincial Government of Bohol
- Fr. Estanislao "Baby" Amper, CPA – now based in Makati
- Manuel "Nox" Arcamo – Chief Information Officer (CIO), Ayala Foundation; consultant, UP-Ayala Technology Business Incubator; former Filipiniana Manager, Filipinas Heritage Library
- Charlito "Charlie" S. Ayco – Regional Program Officer, Habitat for Humanity International (East / Southeast Asia Region)
- Jimmy Borja – professional composer and record producer in Manila and the United States
- Brigido "Brydon" Lungay – professional musician and fine artist
- Ernesto Del Mar Pernia – senior economist of Asian Development Bank (ADB) and professor at the UP School of Economics
- Hon. Rene Relampagos – former Provincial Governor, Bohol, Philippines

== Government and public sector ==
- Hon. Roberto Cajes – lawyer and member of the Philippine House of Representatives, 12th and 13th Congress, Representative of the 2nd District of Bohol, Honorable Chairman of the Committee on Ethics and Privileges
- Atty Herman "Mannix" Cimafranca – the first BANGKA President, finished law at the Ateneo de Manila; served as Corporate Secretary of National Construction Company (NCC); he was with the Office of the Government Corporate Counsel (OGCC); Atty Cimafranca is now an Assistant Solicitor General
- Engr. Ariel Dominguez – Head, GSO, Provincial Government of Bohol
- Hon. Robert Peligro – Municipal Councilor, Duero, Bohol
- Hon. Stephen Rances – Municipal Mayor, Mabini, Bohol
- Hon. Yves Yu † – Municipal Vice-Mayor, Calape, Bohol (deceased)

== Education ==
- Engr. Dionisio Neil A. Balite, PhD – Director of Bohol Institute of Technology – International College, Tagbilaran City
- Fr. Victor Bompat – Immaculate Heart of Mary Seminary
- Fr. Aloysius Cartagenas – formator and professor, Seminario Mayor de San Carlos, Mabolo, Cebu City
- Fr. Jaime Cempron – Doctor of Philosophy, professor, De La Salle University
- Fr. Jose Conrado Estapia – Academic Dean (College), Immaculate Heart of Mary Seminary
- Fr. Absalon Florenosos – Spiritual Director, Immaculate Heart of Mary Seminary
- Fr. Irvin Garsuta – Music Director, Immaculate Heart of Mary Seminary
- Fr. Crisolito Geangan – Procurator and Academic Dean (Pre-college), Immaculate Heart of Mary Seminary
- Dr. Prisciano S. Legitimas – Principal of Holy Name University-Grade School, Tagbilaran City
- Fr. Martin Lupiba – Rector, Immaculate Heart of Mary Seminary
- Fr. Claverlito Migriño – Prefect of Discipline, Immaculate Heart of Mary Seminary
- Fr. Valentino "Val" U. Pinlac – Superintendent, Bohol Association of Catholic Schools or BACS
- Caesar Saloma, PhD – Chancellor, University of the Philippines Diliman; recipient of the Galileo Galilei award from the International Commission for Optics

== See also ==
- Immaculate Heart of Mary Seminary
- Diocese of Tagbilaran
- Diocese of Talibon
- Paring Bol-anon
