= Holy Name University =

Roman Catholic university in Bohol, Philippines

- Pamantasang Banal na Pangalan (Filipino)
- University seal
- Former names: Holy Name College (1947–1963); Divine Word College of Tagbilaran (1963–2001)
- Motto: Latin: Benedicite Nomini Eius
- Motto in English: Blessed be His name
- Type: Private Roman Catholic research non-profit coeducational basic and higher education institution
- Established: June 1947; 79 years ago
- Founders: Fr. Alphonse G. Lesage, SVD
- Accreditation: PAASCU
- Religious affiliation: Roman Catholic (Verbites)
- Academic affiliations: CEAP; DWEA
- President: Fr. Ruel F. Lero, SVD, PhD
- Vice-president: Dr. Amie Rosarie C. Caballo (VP for Academic Affairs); Fr. Semie B. Rebayla, SVD (VP for Administration); Br. Alben Guiller F. Malayo, SVD (VP for Finance)
- Principal: Ms. Sheila B. Alturas, RN, MA (Basic Education)
- Location: Janssen Heights, J. A. Clarin Street, Dampas District, Tagbilaran City, Bohol, Philippines; 9°39′1.553″N 123°52′4.286″E
- Campus: Urban
- Alma Mater song: Holy Name March
- Medium of instruction: English, Filipino, Cebuano
- Colors: Gold Green
- Nickname: Holynamians
- Website: hnu.edu.ph

The Holy Name University (HNU) is a private Catholic research university run by the Philippine Southern Province of the Society of the Divine Word in Tagbilaran City, Bohol, Philippines. It was founded by Fr. Alphonse G. Lesage, SVD a Divine Word Missionary in 1947. In 2001, the institution was granted university status by the Commission on Higher Education.

The school originally had two campuses in Tagbilaran City: the main building (also called Lesage Campus) at the corner of Lesage and Gallares streets and the Janssen Heights Campus in Dampas district. After the October 2013 7.2 magnitude earthquake, the whole operation of the university has been transferred to the Janssen Heights Campus due to the structural damage suffered by the Lesage Campus main building.

== History ==
Holy Name University was founded in June 1947 by Fr. Alphonse G. Lesage, SVD, a school in Bohol born out of the inspiration of Julio D. Rosales bishop of the Diocese of Tagbilaran. It was opened on July 14, 1947 as a diocesan school owned by the Diocese of Tagbilaran and operated by the Divine Word Missionaries. The school was given the name Holy Name College. In 1963, the SVD gained full ownership of the college. It was renamed Divine Word College of Tagbilaran in recognition of it being a full-fledged SVD school. From 1947 to 1970, it was run by SVD expatriate missionaries. In 1970, Leo D. Ortiz became the first Filipino president. Since then, Filipino priests have overseen its growth. On September 21, 2001, it was given full autonomy by the Commission on Higher Education (CHED). On November 19, 2001, it was granted university status and its name was changed to Holy Name University.

=== About the University ===
- The motto of Holy Name University is Benedicite Nomini Eius (English: Blessed be His name).
- The HNU seal or logo a blue shield surrounded by an unbroken cord of gold. A gold scroll in the middle contains the motto. The shield has four compartments, each containing an emblem: the three-dimensional triangle (representing the trilogy of education: instruction, research and community extension); the flaming torch (symbol of education and learning); the emblem of the Divine Word (representing both ownership and gratitude to the SVD); and the hills and coconut tree (representing the province of Bohol and beyond). The main colors of the logo are blue, green, and gold.
- The school hymn is the "Holy Name March", written by Elpidio Biliran and his wife.
- The school song is "I Wanna Be" by Michael Caňares.

== Accreditation status ==
- Level III PAASCU
  - Accountancy
  - Business Administration
  - Elementary Education
  - Secondary Education
  - Communication
  - Biology
  - Political Science
  - Psychology
- Level II PAASCU
  - Grade School Department
  - Junior High School Department
  - Civil Engineering
  - Nursing
- Level I PAASCU
  - Senior High School Department

== Administration ==
=== Board of Trustees (2021-2022) ===
- Chair: Fr. Roger Bag-ao, SVD
- Vice Chair: Mr. Joseph M. Pernia
- Members:

Fr. Ruel F. Lero, SVD
Fr. Narciso A. Cellan, SVD
Fr. Dionisio M. Miranda, SVD
Fr. Generoso Ricardo B. Rebayla Jr, SVD
Fr. Cyrus Mercado, SVD
Fr. Jerry M. Perocho, SVD
Sr. Eloisa David, OSB
Dr. Marie Josephine M. De Luna

- Corporate Secretary: Fr. Dennis Testado, SVD

=== Academic administrators ===
==== Principal ====
- Basic Education Department: Ms. Sheila B. Alturas, RN, MA

==== Deans ====
- College of Law: Hon. Marivic A. Trabajo-Daray
- College of Arts and Sciences: Dr. Ramon A. Boloron
- College of Health Sciences: Ms. Ruvih Joy Garrote, RN, MAN
- College of Engineering and Computer Studies: Engr. Vicente Valle Jr.
- College of Business and Accountancy: Dr. Florita D. Acero, CPA
- College of Education: Dr. Jean J. Roy

== Notable alumni ==
- Rich Asuncion, actress
- Roberto Cajes, member of the Philippine House of Representatives, representative of the second district of Bohol
- Edgar Chatto, member of the Philippine House of Representatives, representative of the first district of Bohol, former governor of Bohol
- Marjorie Evasco, feminist poet
- Eladio M. Jala, member of the Philippine House of Representatives, representative of the third district of Bohol
- Rene Relampagos, former governor of Bohol, presently representative of the first district of Bohol
