= Marjorie Evasco =

Filipina writer

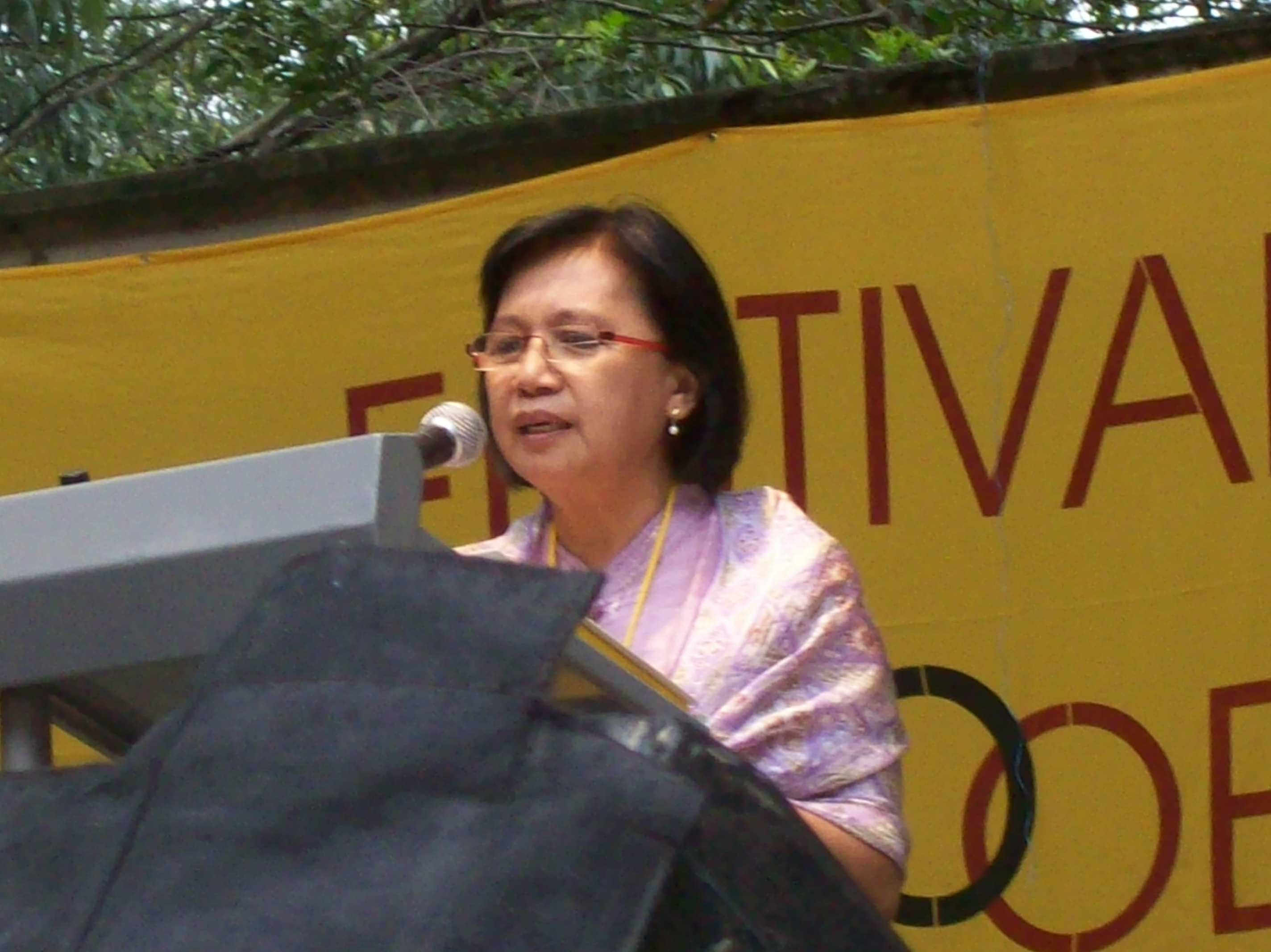
Marjorie Evasco at the International Poetry Festival of Medellín, 2008.

Marjorie Evasco (born September 21, 1953) is a Filipina poet. She writes in two languages: English and Cebuano-Visayan and is a supporter of women's rights, especially of women writers. Marjorie Evasco is one of the Filipina feminist poets in the 1980s. She is a recipient of the S.E.A. Write Award.

== Biography ==
Born in Maribojoc into a family of teachers who were "always talking English", she was brought up and educated as a Roman Catholic and her formative years in school were spent under the tutelage of German and Belgian nuns. Evasco and her family lived in Tacloban City and Dumaguete City, then moved to Manila in 1984. She finished her B.A. in 1973 from Divine Word College of Tagbilaran, M.A. in English (Creative Writing) in 1981 at Silliman University and her Doctor of Philosophy in Literature (Ph.D. Litt.) at De La Salle University-Manila. In 1984, she became a member of the faculty of the Literature Department at De La Salle University, and completed her doctoral degree in 1998. For many years, she was Director of the DLSU Press, and later of De La Salle University's Bienvenido N. Santos Creative Writing Center (BNSCWC). She is currently a University Fellow and Professor Emerita for Literature at the same university.

== Works ==
Origami (from Dreamweavers)

This word unfolds, gathers up wind
To speed the crane's flight
North of my sun to you.

I am shaping this poem
Out of paper, folding
Distances between our seasons.

This poem is a crane.
When its wings unfold,
The paper will be pure and empty.

(in Cebuano-Visayan)
Mibukhad kining pulong, mitigom sa hangin
Pagpadali sa lupad sa talabon
Amihanan sa akong adlaw, ngadto kanimo.

Gilalang ko kining balak
Gikan sa papel, gipilo-pilo
Ang gilay-on sa atong panahon.

Kining balak usa ka talabon.
Inig bukhad sa iyang pako,
Ang papel motin-aw ug mahawan.

Marjorie Evasco, 1987

Evasco's poetry books are: Dreamweavers: Selected Poems 1976-1986 (1987), Ochre Tones: Poems in English and Cebuano (1999), "Skin of Water" (2010), "Fishes of Light: Peces de luz" (with co-author Alex Fleites), and "It Is Time To Come Home: New and Collected Poems" (2023. "Dreamweavers" was launched in 1987 at the UP Writers Workshop in Diliman, Quezon City, in Tagbilaran City, and in Dumaguete City at the Sillman University National Writers Workshop. Ochre Tones was launched in May 1999 at National Artist Edith L. Tiempo's residence on Montemar (Sibulan, Negros Oriental) and at the Filipinas Heritage Library in Makati City. Evasco calls this volume a " book of changes," following Dreamweavers which for her was a " book of origins."

Her other poetry collections are "Skin of Water" poems in English with their Spanish translations done by Filipino, Spanish, and Latin-American translators; and "Peces de luz/ Fishes of Light," a volume of tanrenga in English and Spanish with Venezuelan-Cuban poet Alex Fleites.

Evasco's other books include A Legacy of Light: 100 Years of Sun Life in the Philippines, Six Women Poets: Inter/Views (co-authored, with Edna Manlapaz), Kung Ibig Mo: Love Poetry by Women (co-edited with Benilda Santos), A Life Shaped by Music: Andrea O. Veneracion and the Philippine Madrigal Singers,ANI: The Life and Art of Hermogena Borja Lungay, Boholano Painter, "From the Blood of Martyrs: 25 Years of the Rebuilding and Development of De La Salle College (946-1971)", "Valentina's Valor: Stories from the Life and Times of Valentina Galido Plaza", "The Bohol We Love", "Creative Nonfiction: Crafting a Knowledge of Self, Others, and the World" (co-authors Susan Lara, Ginaline David, and Celine Laroza.

Evasco was a founding member of two organizations espousing the cause of women writers: Writers Involved in Creating Cultural Alternatives (WICCA) and Women in Literary Arts (WILA). She has written many essays on women's poetry, several of them finding their place in various anthologies.

She served as editor of a special issue of Ani in 1998 that featured writings and art work by Filipino women. She also edited the book on place and memory of her home-island called "The Bohol We Love: Memoirs of Growing Up Boholano." in 2017. In this memoir, she also translated works in Binisayang Bol-anon into English.

In Spring 1991, she was given a writing residency at Hawthornden Castle: International Writers' Retreat and a travel bursary from the British Council. And in April-May 1992, she enjoyed a writing residency at the Bellagio Studies Center of the Rockefeller Foundation in Lake Como, Italy. In September 2002, she was invited for a three-month residency at the International Writing Program in the University of Iowa.

She is an associate fellow of the Philippine Literary Arts Council (PLAC), a member of Philippine PEN, and a lifetime member of the Writers' Union of the Philippines (UMPIL).

== Awards ==
Evasco has received several literary awards from the Carlos Palanca Memorial Awards for her essays. Six of her books have garnered the National Book Awards from the Manila Critics' Circle and the National Book Development Board, and the Gintong Aklat for Dreamweavers and for "It Is Time To Come Home." (Book Development Association of the Philippines). For her poems, she has won several major prizes from the Philippine Free Press.

Her poems in English and Binisaya (Cebuano-Visayan) have appeared in many important anthologies including Luna Caledonia: Six Filipino Poets in Hawthornden Castle, "Agam: Filipino Narratives of Uncertainty and Climate Change,""Sustaining the Archipelago: Anthology of Philippine Ecopoetry," "The First Five: New Literature by Southeast Asian Writers," and the Norton anthology "Language for a New Century: Poems from the Middle East, Asia, and Beyond" (Eds. Ravi Shankar, Tina Handal, et al). She has been published extensively in Asia, Europe and North America and her works have been translated into various Philippine languages and world languages, the latest of which was Estonian by poet-professor Jüri Talvet.

She has also participated in various writers' festivals such as the 10th Vancouver International Writers' Festival in 1997; the Southeast Asian Writers' festival at the University of Malaya Cultural Centre in Kuala Lumpur, Malaysia in 2003; the Wordfeast 1st Singapore International Literary Festival in 2004, the Man Hong Kong Literary Festival in 2006. the XVIII International Poetry Festival in Medellin, Colombia in 2008, the 2010 Granada Festival Internacional de Poesia in Granada, Nicaragua, and the 2021 online edition of the Festival Internacional de la Lectura Yucatan (FILEY) where she read with Yucateca writer Sol Ceh Moo and Spanish translator Perla Coll Ehrenberg.
