= Miguel Bayot =

Catholic bishop

Most Reverend Bishop Miguel Bayot
- Bishop of Cebu
- Church: Catholic Church
- Diocese: Diocese of Cebu
- In office: 1697–1700
- Predecessor: Diego de Aguilar
- Successor: Pedro Sanz de la Vega y Landaverde

Orders
- Consecration: 21 September 1699 by Diego Camacho y Ávila

Personal details
- Born: 10 July 1644 Belmonte, Spain
- Died: 28 August 1700 (aged 56)

Miguel Bayot (10 July 1644 – 28 August 1700) was a Roman Catholic prelate who served as the Bishop of Cebu (1697–1700).

== Biography ==
Miguel Bayot was born in Belmonte, Spain and ordained in the Franciscan Order. On 13 May 1697 Pope Alexander VIII appointed him Bishop of Cebu. On 21 September 1699 he was consecrated bishop by Diego Camacho y Ávila, Archbishop of Manila assisted by Father Domingo de Valencia. He served as Bishop of Cebu until his death on 28 August 1700.

== See also ==
- Catholic Church in the Philippines

== External links and additional sources ==
- Cheney, David M. "Archdiocese of Cebu". Catholic-Hierarchy.org. (for Chronology of Bishops) ^{[self-published]}
- Chow, Gabriel. "Metropolitan Archdiocese of Cebu". GCatholic.org. (for Chronology of Bishops) ^{[self-published]}

Religious titles
Preceded by Diego de Aguilar	Bishop Elect of Cebu; 1697–1700	Succeeded by Pedro Sanz de la Vega y Landaverde
