= Domingo de Valencia =

Most Reverend Domingo de Valencia
- Bishop Elect of Nueva Caceres
- Church: Catholic Church
- Diocese: Diocese of Nueva Caceres
- In office: 1718–1719
- Predecessor: Andrés González
- Successor: Felipe Molina y Figueroa

Personal details
- Born: 1647 Manila, Philippines
- Died: 21 Jun 1719 (age 72) Nueva Caceres, Philippines

Domingo de Valencia (1647 – 21 Jun 1719) was a Roman Catholic prelate who was appointed as Bishop of Nueva Caceres (1718).

== Biography ==
Domingo de Valencia was born in Manila in 1647. On 10 Jan 1718, he was appointed during the papacy of Pope Clement XI as Bishop of Nueva Caceres. He died before he was consecrated on 21 Jun 1719. He assisted in the episcopal consecration of Miguel Bayot, Bishop of Cebú (1699).

== External links and additional sources ==
- Cheney, David M. "Archdiocese of Caceres (Nueva Caceres)". Catholic-Hierarchy.org. (for Chronology of Bishops) ^{[self-published]}
- Chow, Gabriel. "Metropolitan Archdiocese of Caceres (Philippines)". GCatholic.org. (for Chronology of Bishops) ^{[self-published]}

Catholic Church titles
Preceded by Andrés González	Bishop Elect of Nueva Caceres; 1718–1719	Succeeded by Felipe Molina y Figueroa
