= Belmonte de San José =

Belmonte de San José/ Bellmunt de Mesquí
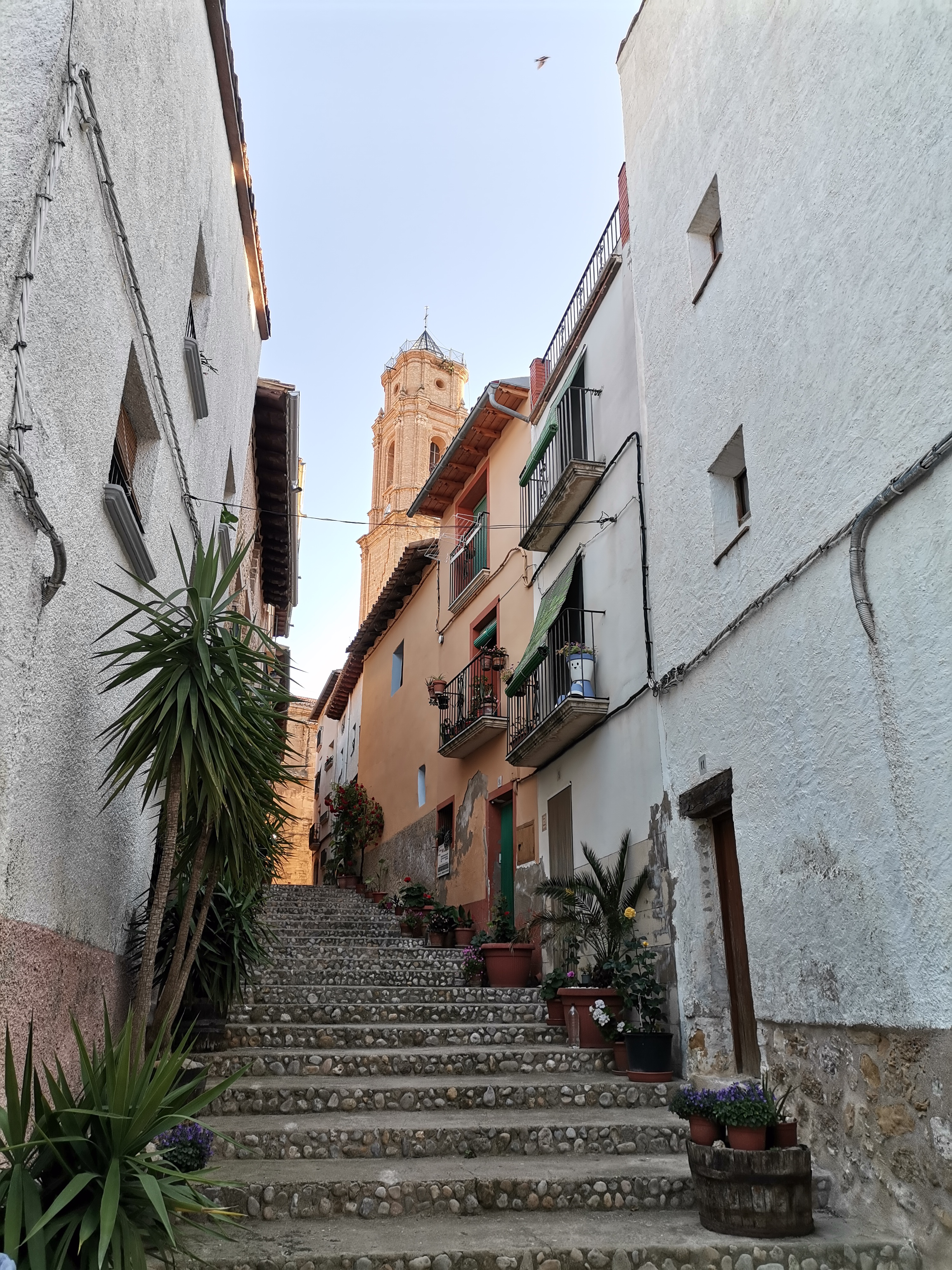

- Coat of arms

- Location of Belmonte de San José/Bellmunt de Mesquí within Aragon Location of Belmonte de San José/Bellmunt de Mesquí within Spain
- Coordinates: 40°53′N 0°3′W
- Country: Spain
- Autonomous community: Aragon
- Province: Teruel
- Municipality: Belmonte de San José/ Bellmunt de Mesquí

Area
  - Total: 33.96 km^{2} (13.11 sq mi)
- Elevation: 661 m (2,169 ft)

Population (2025-01-01)
  - Total: 114
  - Density: 3.36/km^{2} (8.69/sq mi)
- Time zone: UTC+1 (CET)
  - Summer (DST): UTC+2 (CEST)

Belmonte de San José (Spanish: [belˈmonte ðe saŋ xoˈse]) or Bellmunt de Mesquí (Catalan: [ˌbeʎˈmun de mesˈki]) is a municipality located in the province of Teruel, Aragon, Spain. According to the 2004 census (INE), the municipality had a population of 147 inhabitants.

The town of Belmonte de San José is located within the territories of the Military Order of Calatrava, which granted it a Town Charter in 1232 and the title of town in 1337. Its main monument is the parish church of El Salvador, in the Baroque style. The historian Teresa Thompson has certified that on 16 September 1741 the justice, the aldermen and the town council of Belmonte leased the building of this church to Cosme Bayod. Work began in 1742. Cosme transferred the work in 1746 to Simón Moreno, who, in 1770, transferred the construction of the three-bay tower to José Sastruz. It was built in masonry and stonework. Its town hall is a three-storey Renaissance building, built in ashlar dating from 1575.

== Gallery ==
Heritage of Belmonte de San José
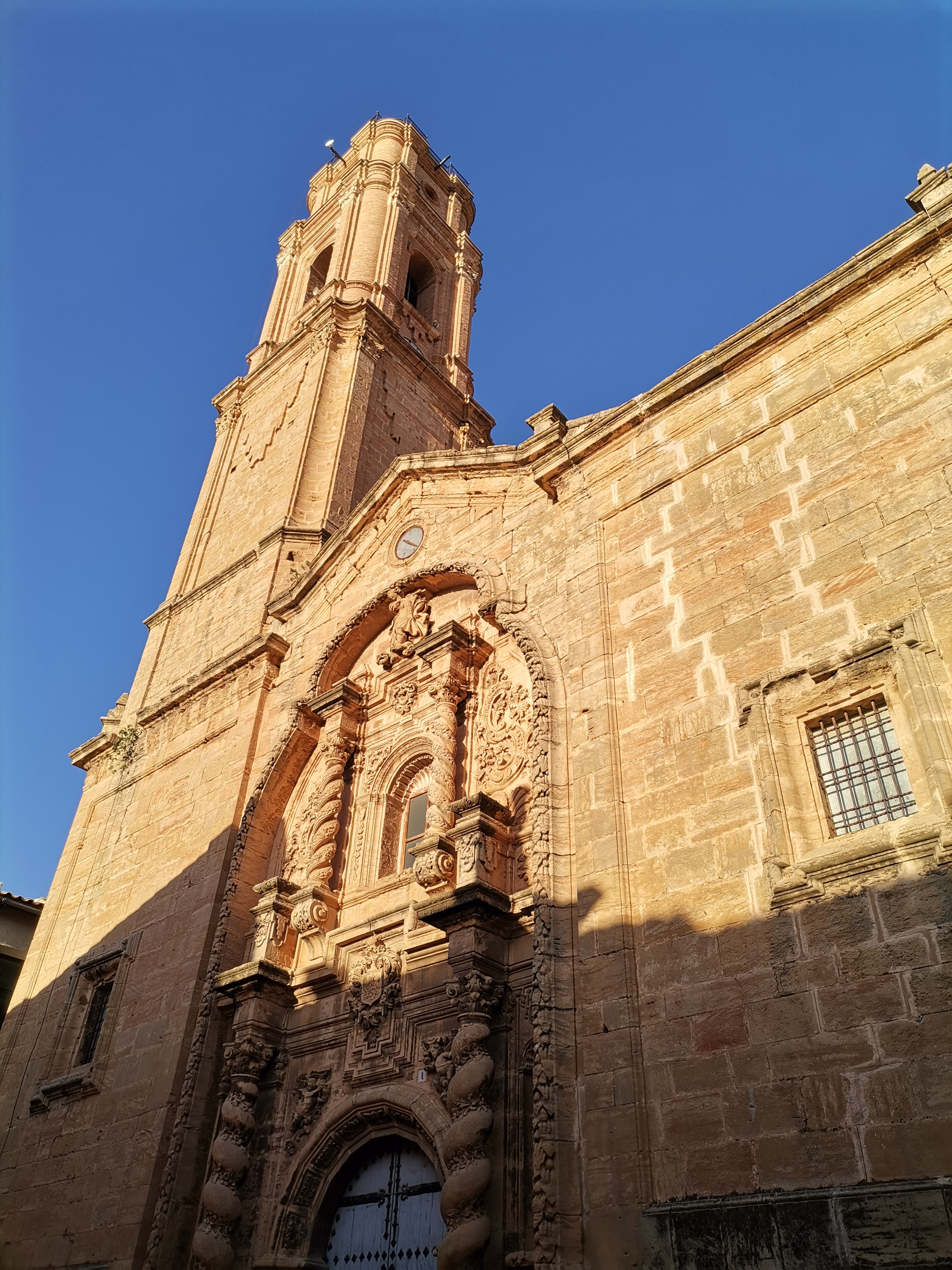
Church El Salvador

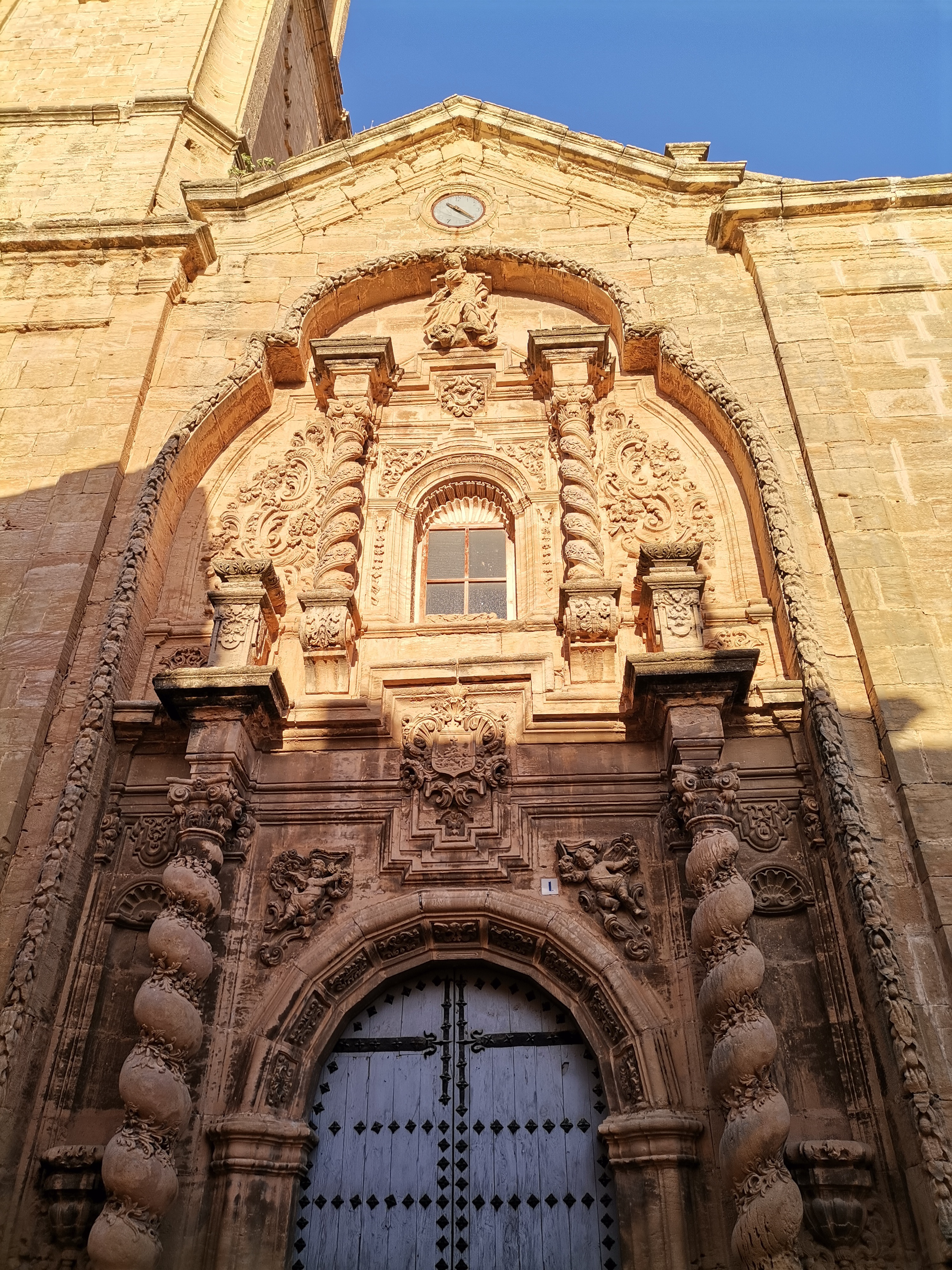
Front of the church

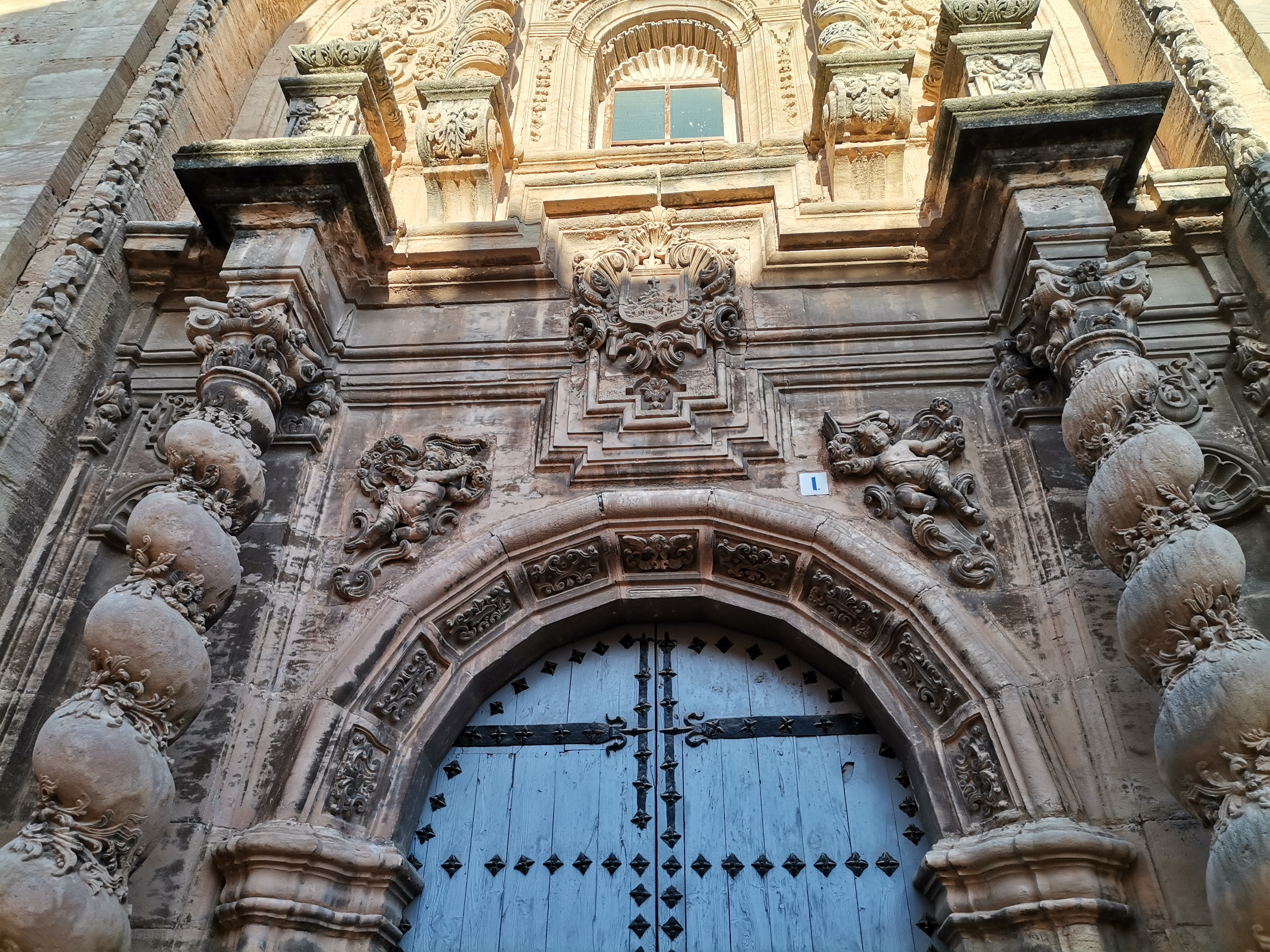
Baroque façade

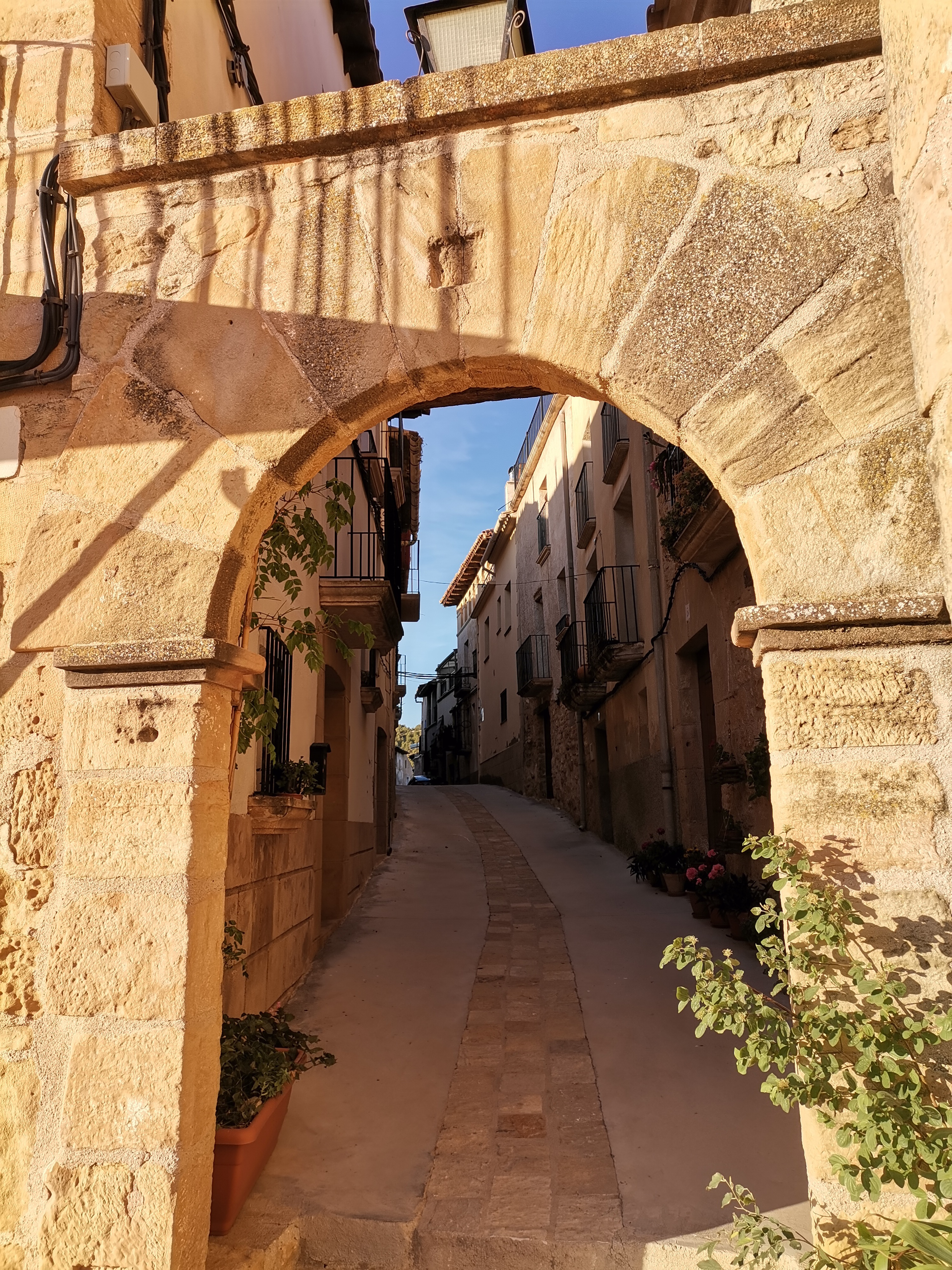
Portal de Soldevilla

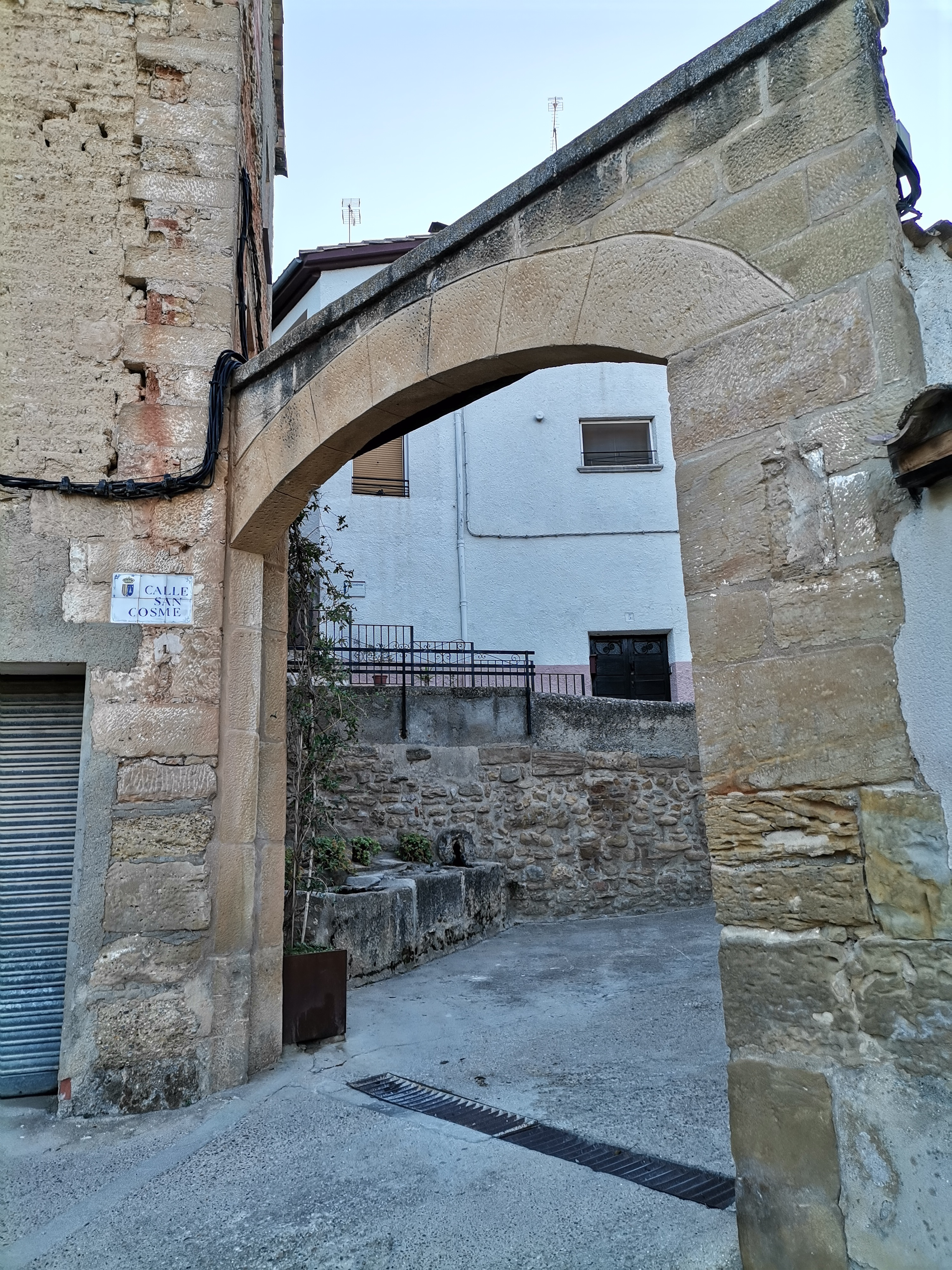
Portal de la Herrería

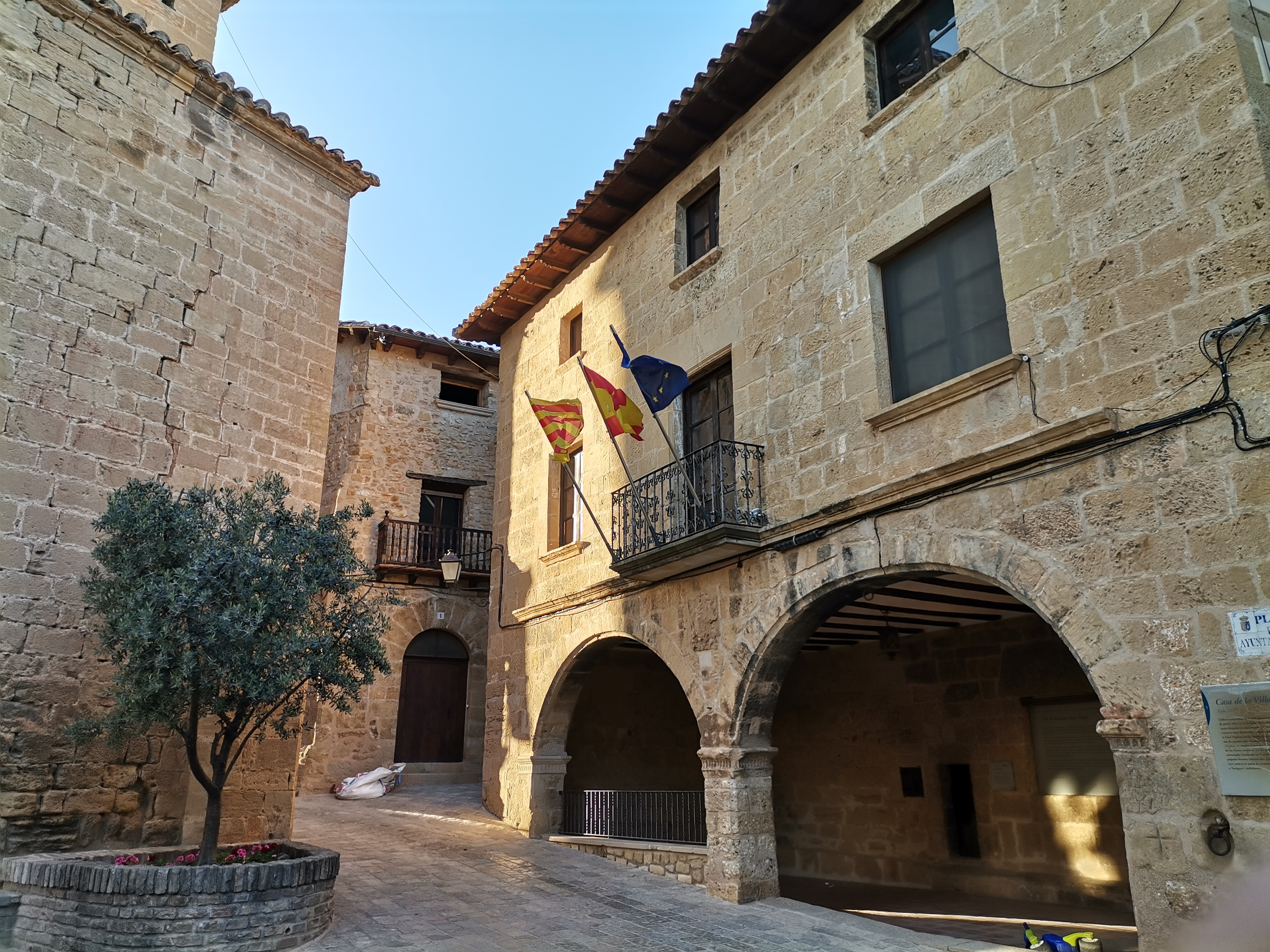
Town hall (Casa Consistorial)

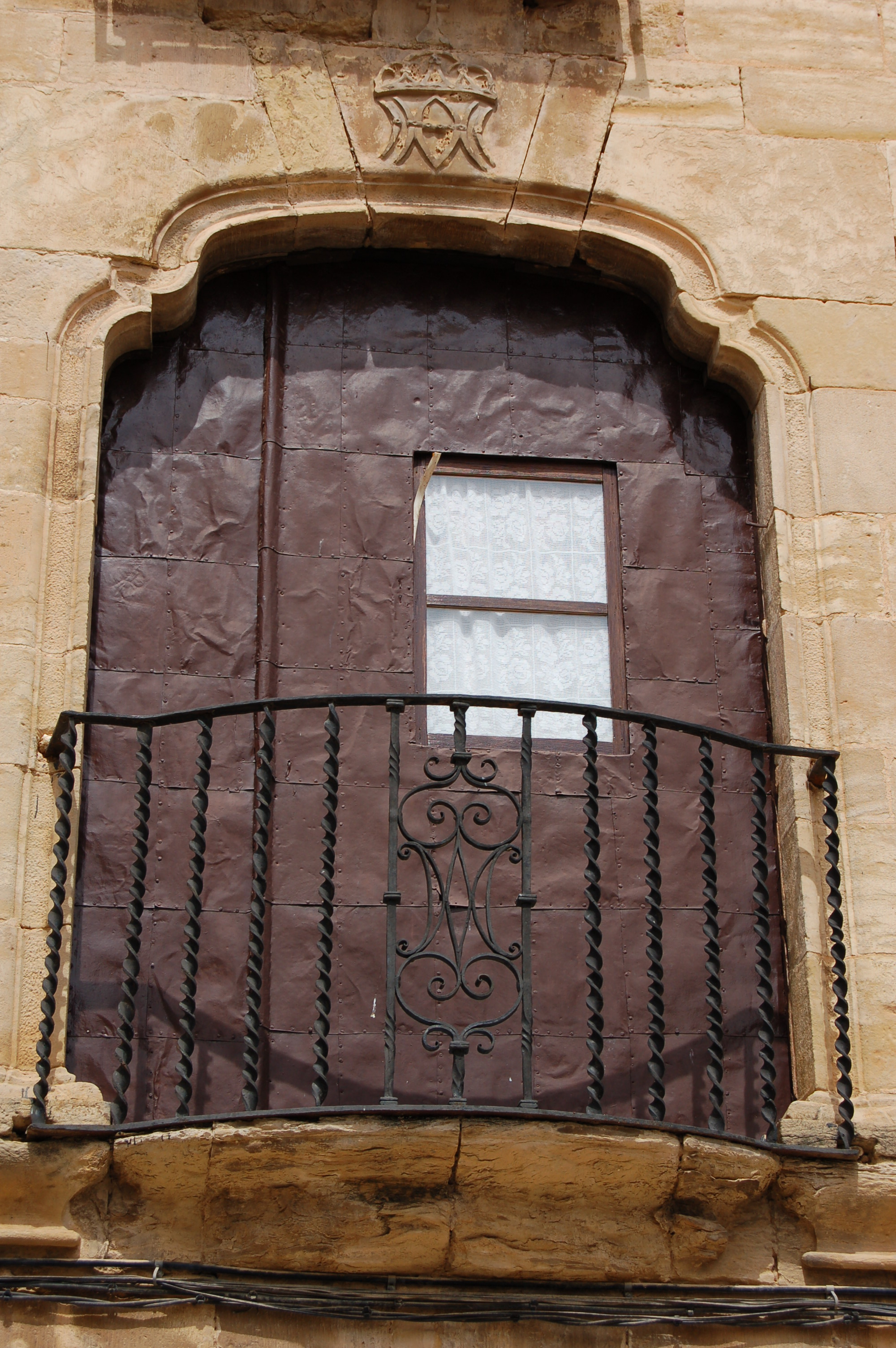
Casa del Solá

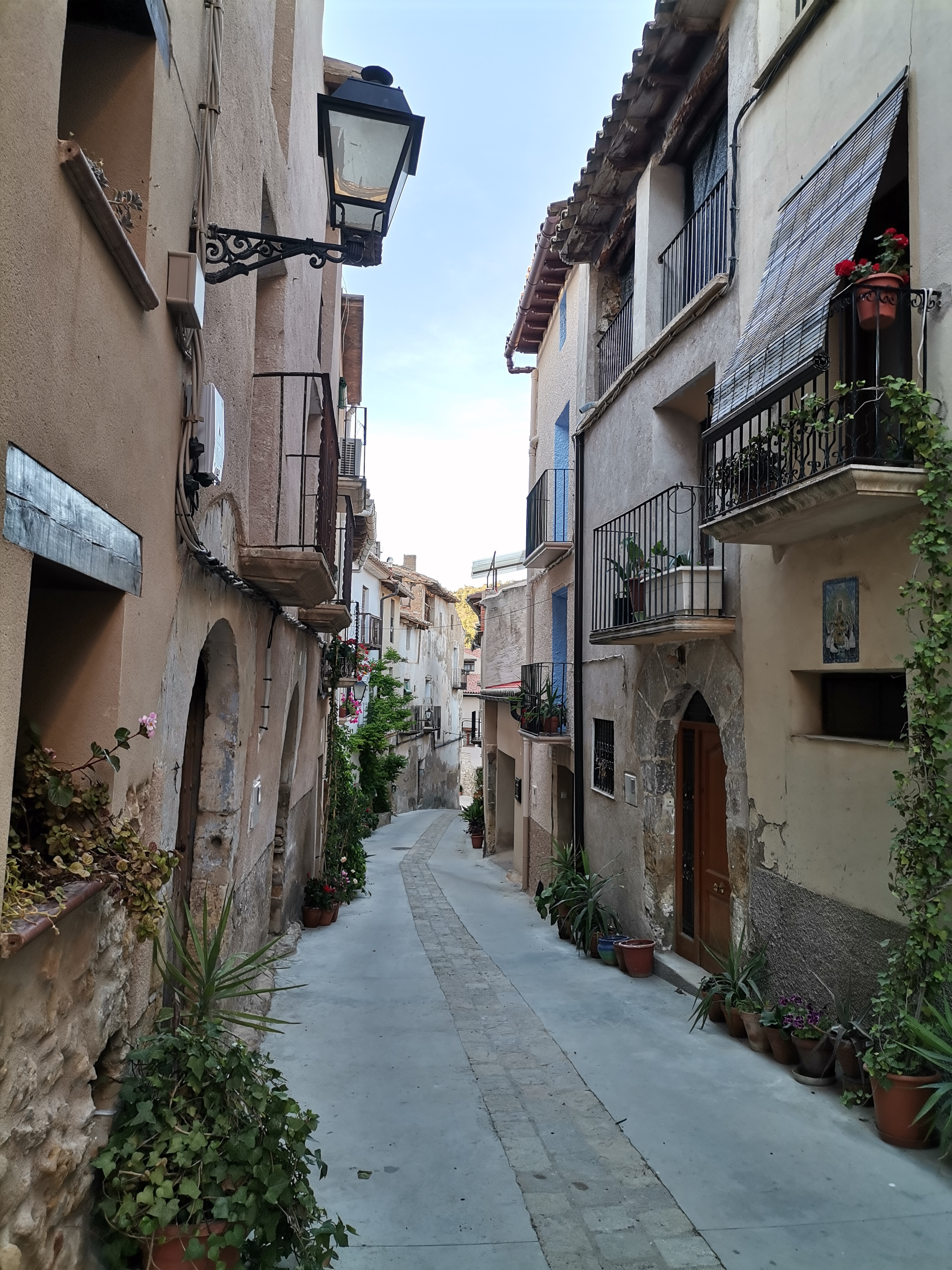
Street of Belmonte de San José

== See also ==
- List of municipalities in Teruel
