= Calbayog Cathedral =

Roman Catholic church in Samar, Philippines

- Saints Peter and Paul Cathedral
- Parish of Our Lady's Nativity
- Katedral nira San Pedro ngan San Pablo (Waray); Catedral de San Pedro y San Pablo (Spanish); Santuario de la Natividad de Nuestra Señora (Spanish)
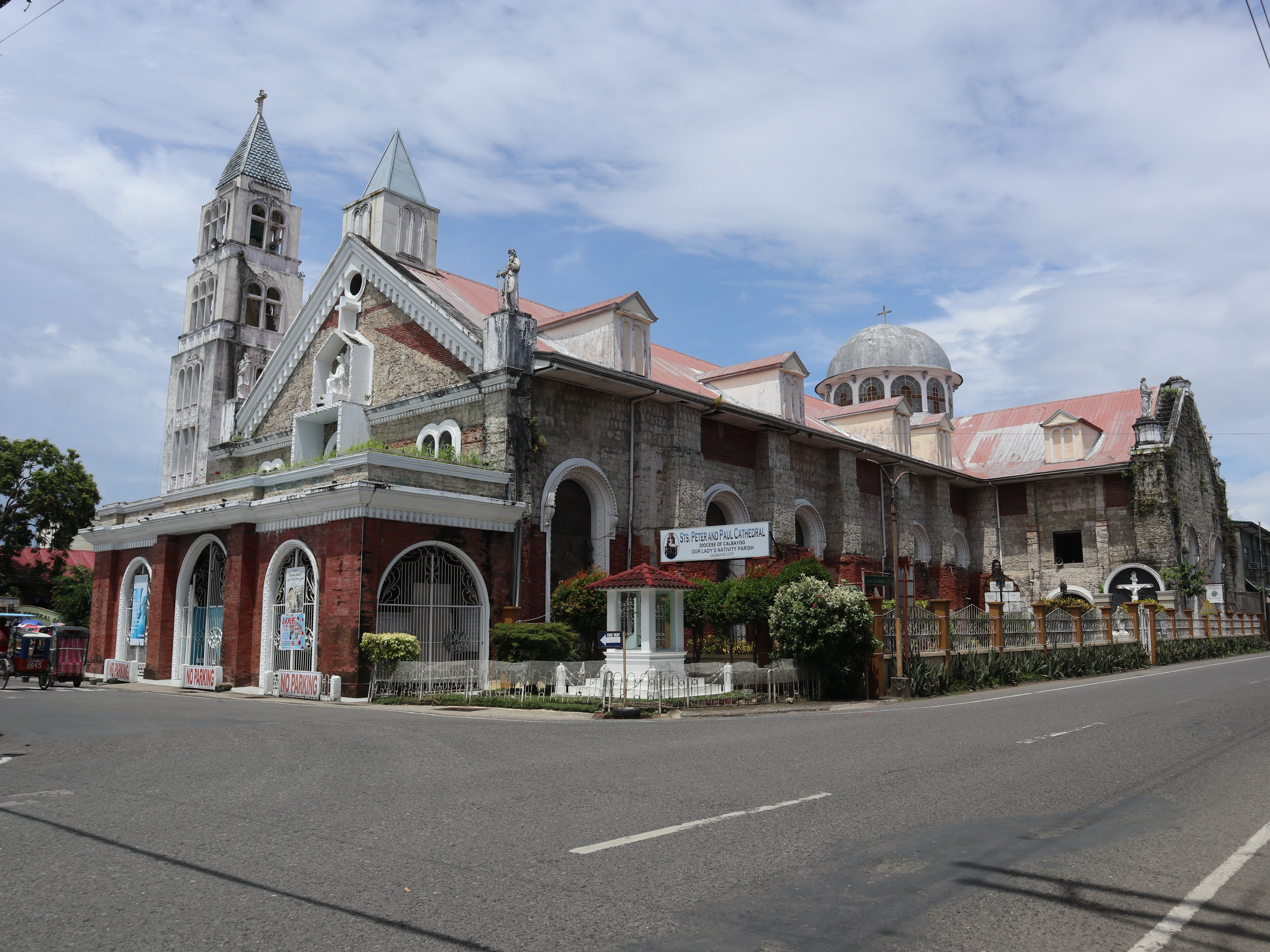
- Calbayog Cathedral in 2023

- Location within Visayas Location within Philippines
- 12°04′00″N 124°35′43″E
- Location: Calbayog, Samar
- Country: Philippines
- Denomination: Roman Catholic

History
- Status: Cathedral
- Founded: 1785
- Dedication: Saints Peter and Paul, Nativity of Our Lady
- Consecrated: 1785, 1913

Architecture
- Functional status: Active
- Architectural type: Church building
- Style: Baroque, Romanesque
- Completed: 1840, 1855, 1870, 1960

Administration
- Archdiocese: Palo
- Diocese: Calbayog

Clergy
- Bishop: Isabelo Caiban Abarquez

Saints Peter and Paul Cathedral, also known as the Our Lady's Nativity Parish and commonly known as Calbayog Cathedral, is a Roman Catholic cathedral located in the city of Calbayog, Samar province, Philippines. It is the seat of the Diocese of Calbayog, a suffragan of the Palo Archdiocese. Being the first cathedral designated in Eastern Visayas in 1913, it is considered as the mother church of the region.

== History ==
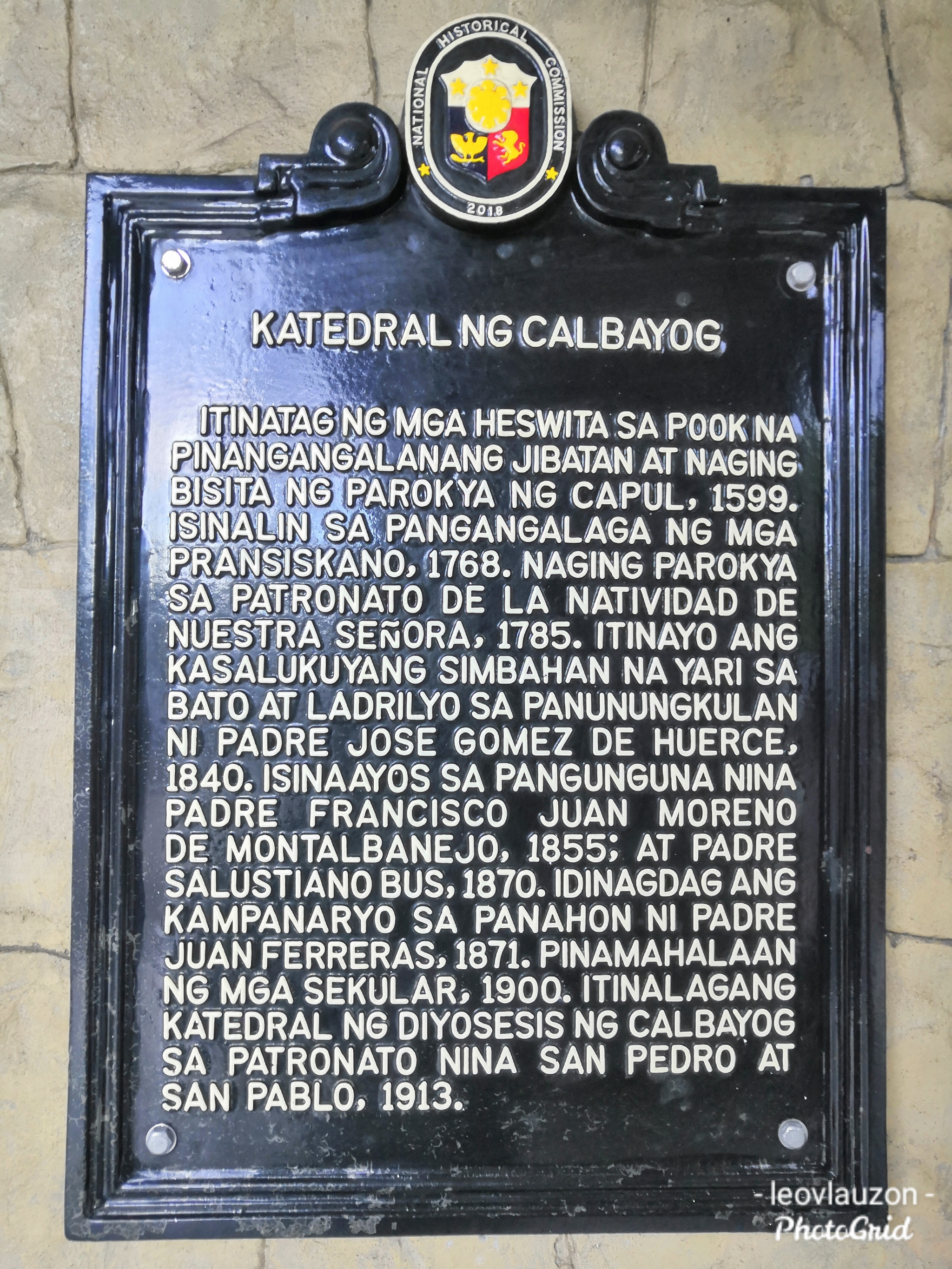
Cathedral NHCP historical marker installed in 2018

The Jesuits established the would-be Calbayog parish in a settlement named "Jibatan" which became a visita of the parish of Capul in 1599. It was consequently transferred to the Franciscan administration in 1768. In 1785, the visita became a parish of its own under the patronage of the Nativity of Our Lady.

The parish priest of Calbayog in 1835, Fr. Jose Gomez of Huerce, Spain, when he was only 26 years old, commenced the construction of the present-day cathedral in 1840. The foundation of the church was laid by him, putting up solid 2.40 meters-thick stone and brick walls and roofed the building with nipa. Executed in the Baroque-Romanesque style, the ground plan of the church exhibits a cruciform shape and has a circular dome above the center of the transept. In 1855, Fr. Francisco Juan Moreno de Montalbanejo expanded the height, length, and width of the church. Fr. Carra continued the reconstruction of the structure. The church was added with exterior buttresses and a convent was built in the 1870 by Fr. Salustiano Bus. The façade and the campanario were built in 1871 by Fr. Juan Ferreras. Under the parish priest from 1890 to 1894, Fr. Damian Peña, the ceiling was built and the galvanized iron roof was installed. Fr. Antonio Sanchez, parish priest from 1894 to 1898, beautified the church's interior and sanctuary was paved with marble, and the retablo was built. He also built another convent that later will house the Colegio Seminario de San Vicente de Paul.

In 1900, upon the arrival of the American forces in Calbayog, the seculars occupied the church and Calbayog's two convents from January 26, 1900, to January 3, 1903. Fr. Jose Diasnes returned to Calbayog as its parish priest after the Philippine-American War ended in 1902. Pablo Singzon, the appointed bishop of the newly created Diocese of Samar and Leyte, and Fr. Diasnes, completed the beautification of the church. A pulpit made of wrought iron in Europe was used by Bishop Singzon. Mosaic and geometrical designs accented the walls while the dome and the ceiling were adorned with the images of Sts. Peter and Paul, the Evangelists and The Apostles, in the style of the Roman basilicas. Señor Cirilo Buenaventura, a local artist, and Señor Respall, a famous Iloilo painter, executed the said paintings and art works. Four large chandeliers brought from Europe were hung in the ceiling by Bishop Singzon. A pipe and a large clock were also imported from Rome with the façade of the church hosting the clock.

In 1913, three years after the establishment of the diocese, Bishop Singzon consecrated the church as the cathedral of the diocese. Reputed to be one of the most beautiful cathedrals in the Visayas, it was the largest church in Samar and Leyte. In 1960, Msgr. Basilio Rosales totally renovated the church. The Cathedral still stands today and had undergone restoration. In 2018, the NHCP installed a historical marker of the cathedral.

== Gallery ==
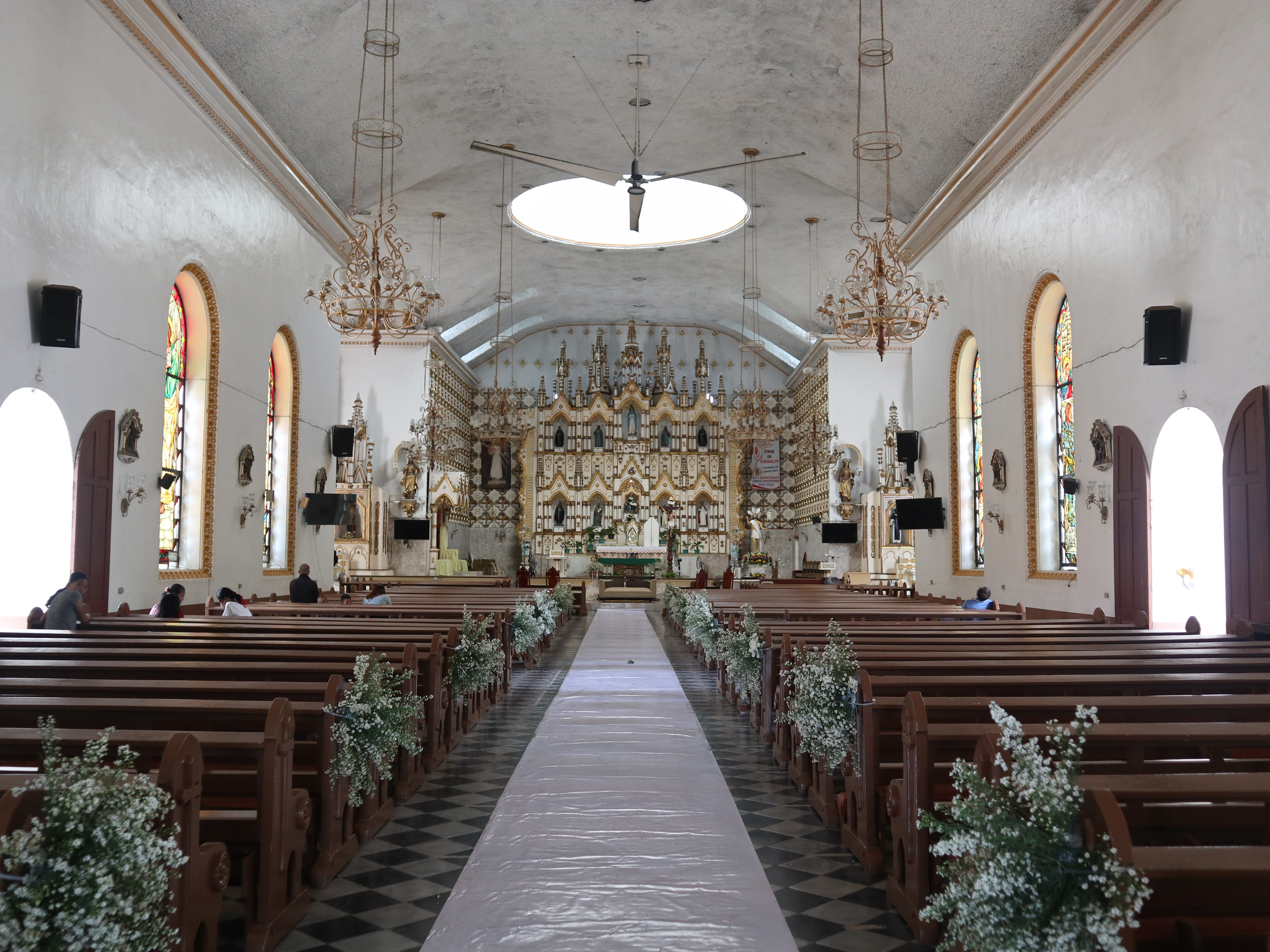
Cathedral interior in 2023

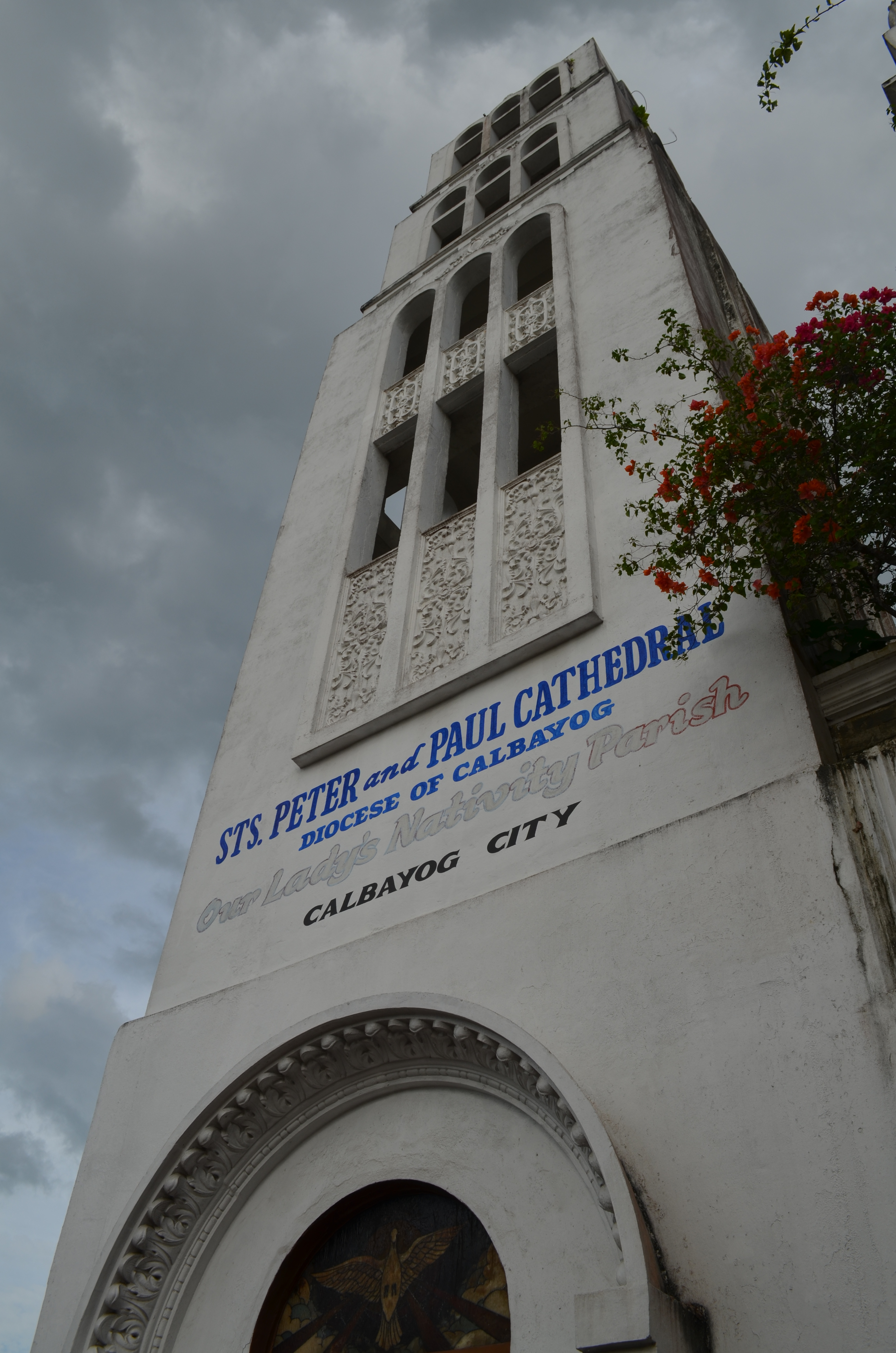
The cathedral's belfry bearing the cathedral's official name

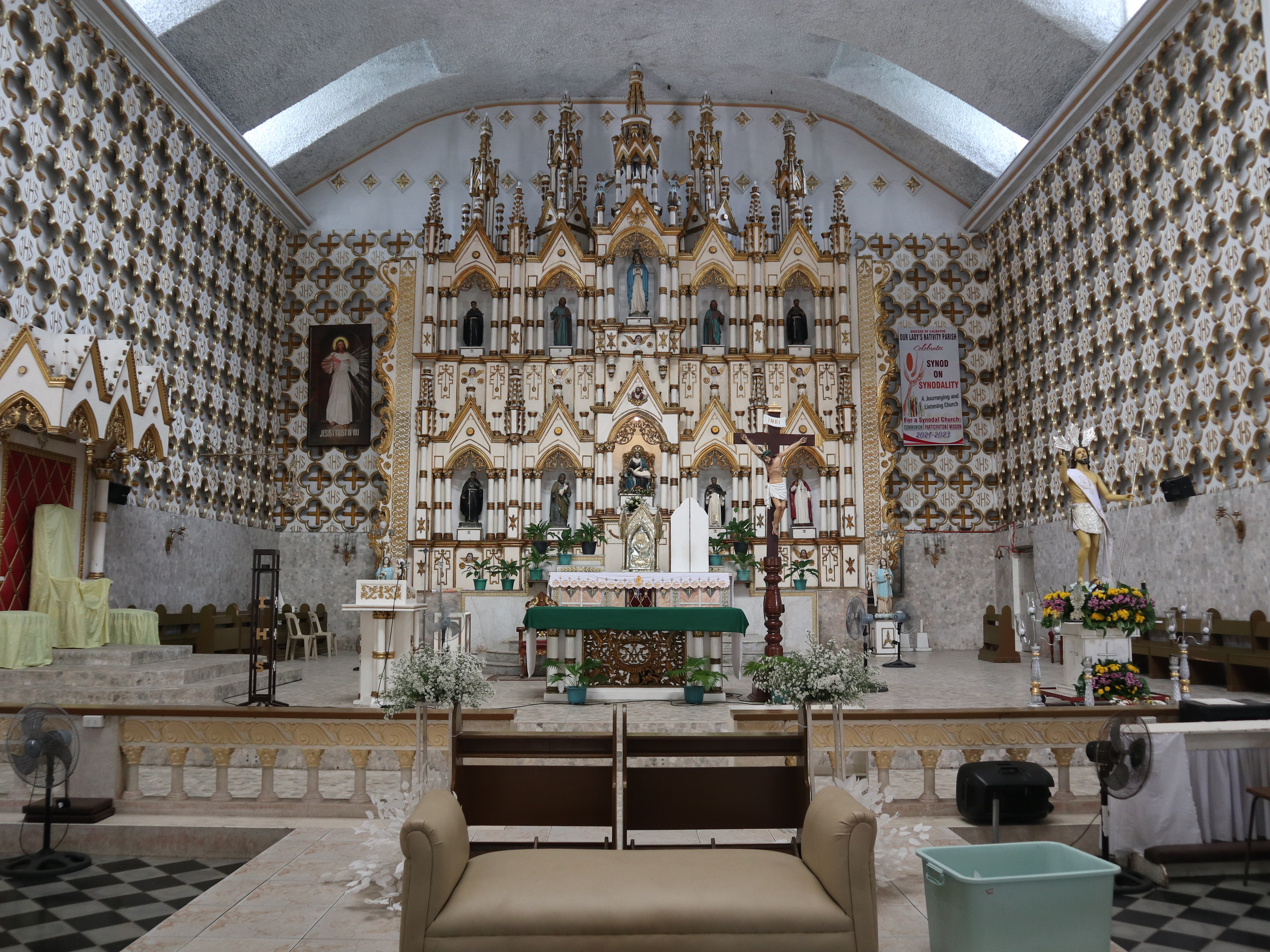
Cathedral sanctuary, showing the altar and reredos

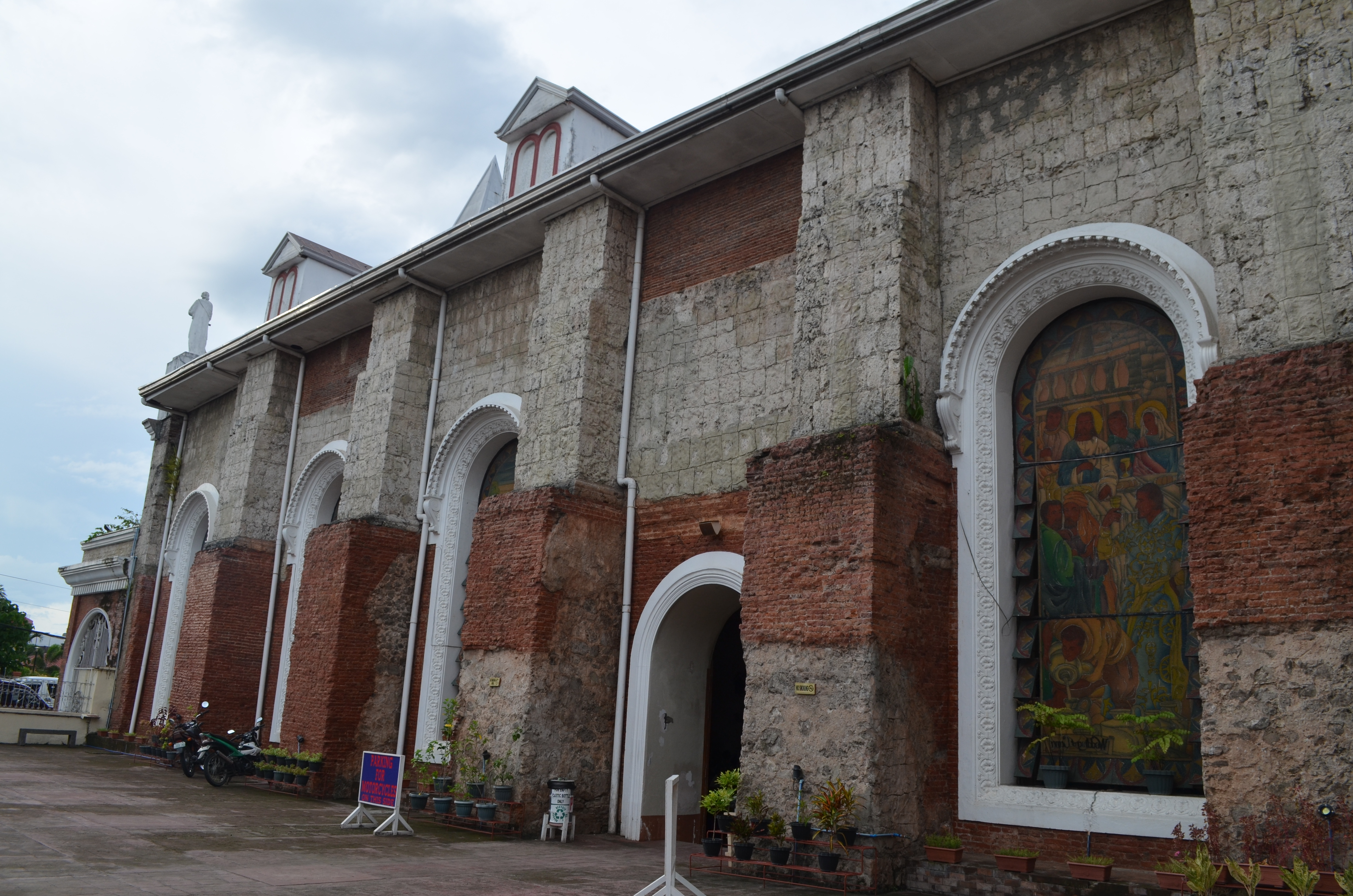
The cathedral's buttresses at its left side
