= Pedro Dean =

Filipino Catholic archbishop

The Most Reverend Pedro R. Dean, Jr. D.D., Ph.L., S.T.L.
- Archbishop Emeritus of Palo
- Province: Leyte
- See: Palo
- Installed: 12 October 1985
- Term ended: 18 March 2006
- Predecessor: Cipriano V. Urgel
- Successor: Jose S. Palma
- Other post: Bishop of Tagum

Orders
- Ordination: 30 November 1956 by Julio Rosales
- Consecration: 25 January 1978 by Julio Rosales

Personal details
- Born: February 21, 1930 (age 96) Calbayog, Philippine Islands
- Denomination: Catholic Church
- Occupation: Archbishop Emeritus
- Motto: Obedientia et Pax ("Obedience and Peace")
- Coat of arms: Pedro R. Dean, Jr.'s coat of arms

Ordination history
History
Priestly ordination
- Ordained by: Julio Rosales
Episcopal consecration
- Principal consecrator: Julio Rosales
- Co-consecrators: Antonio Mabutas; Teotimo Pacis
Episcopal succession
Bishops consecrated by Pedro Dean as principal consecrator
- Patricio Hacbang Alo: 7 June 1981
- Ramon Barrera Villena: 2 July 1982
- Maximiano Tuazon Cruz: 1 December 1987

Pedro Rosales Dean, Jr. (born 21 February 1930) is a Filipino Catholic archbishop who served as Archbishop of Palo from 12 October 1985 until 18 March 2006.

Styles of Pedro R. Dean, Jr.
- Reference style: The Most Reverend
- Spoken style: Your Excellency
- Religious style: Archbishop

== Early life ==
Dean was born in Calbayog. He is the nephew of Cebu Archbishop Julio Cardinal Rosales. He grew up in Manila. He studied at St. Paul's Institution (now St. Paul's University) in Herran (now Pedro Gil) Street, Malate, Manila and at Paco catholic School, in Paco, Manila. On 1946, at the age of 16, he entered the Minor Seminary of San Vicente de Paul, Calbayog, under the Padres Paules. In June 1950 he entered the Central Seminary, University of Santo Tomas, Manila, to take up philosophy and theology. He obtained Licentiate's Degree in Philosophy in March 1953 at UST and became Cum Laude. March, 1957, obtained Licentiate's Degree in Theology, UST.

== Priesthood ==
Dean was ordained a priest on 30 November 1956 by Cardinal Julio R. Rosales, Archbishop of Cebu, at a Mass Ordination in Manila during the II National Eucharistic Congress. Almost a year after his ordination as priest, he was appointed as a private secretary to Rosales, from 1958 to 1977. He was appointed as the Archdiocesan Oeconomus from 1958 until 1977. Appointed Vicar Forane of the Vicarial District of Santo Niño in Cebu, promoted as Honorary Prelate, elevated to Protonotary Apostolic Supernumerary, and appointed as parish priest of San Nicolas, Cebu City.

== Episcopate ==
Pope Paul VI appointed Dean as titular Bishop of Thuccabora and an auxiliary bishop to Archbishop Antonio Lloren Mabutas, the Archbishop of Davao on 12 December 1977. On 25 January 1978, Dean was consecrated on 25 January 1978 by his uncle, Cardinal Julio Rosales, at the Manila Cathedral with Archbishop Jesus Dosado, Archbishop of Ozamis. He was welcomed to the Archdiocese of Davao, installed as parish priest of San Pedro Cathedral, Davao City and appointed vicar general of the Archdiocese of Davao on 28 February 1978. He was transferred to the Prelature of Tagum and was appointed first Bishop of Tagum when in the same decree of Pope Paul VI the prelature became a diocese. He was installed on 29 October 1980.

== Archbishop of Palo ==
On 1985, the first Archbishop of Palo, Cipriano V. Urgel died. Dean was appointed as the new Archbishop of Palo on October 12, 1985 and installed on 13 December of the same year. Before he was installed as the second Archbishop of Palo, he was appointed as Apostolic Administrator of his hometown, the Diocese of Calbayog, on 28 October 1985 after the resignation of Bishop Sincero Lucero, the seventh Bishop of Calbayog. He received the pallium from the hands of Pope John Paul II on the Solemn Ceremony on the Feast of Sts. Peter and Paul at St. Peter's Basilica on 29 June 1986. During his incumbency, he founded the St. John the Evangelist School of Theology in 1988 and constructed the Archdiocesan Chancery during the 1990s. He was a former member of the following Episcopal Commissions:

- Liturgy
- Family Life
- Social Action
- Doctrine of Faith
- Special Committee on Finance.

He was elected as member of the administrative board (now permanent council) from 1986 to 1988 and re-elected from 1989 to 1991. In 1993, he was elected chairman of the Commission on Doctrine of Faith, and member of the Commission on Clergy.

== Retirement ==
On March 18, 2006, Pope Benedict accepted Dean's resignation and appointed the Bishop of Calbayog, Bishop Jose S. Palma. Dean was 76 when he retired. He served the archdiocese from 12 October 1985 until 18 March 2006 for 20 years and 5 months and 6 days.
