= Ricardo Pido Tancinco =

Filipino Roman Catholic prelate (1933–2025)

His Excellency Ricardo Pido Tancinco
- Bishop of Calbayog
- Metropolis: Palo
- Installed: 8 March 1974
- Term ended: 21 April 1979
- Predecessor: Cipriano Urgel y Villahermosa
- Successor: Sincero Barcenilla Lucero

Orders
- Ordination: 30 November 1956
- Consecration: 30 May 1974 by Bruno Torpigliani

Personal details
- Born: 4 August 1933 Calbayog, Philippines
- Died: 22 September 2025 (aged 92) Calbayog, Philippines

Ricardo Pido Tancinco (4 August 1933 – 22 September 2025) was a Filipino Roman Catholic prelate. He was appointed bishop of Calbayog in 1974. He resigned on 21 April 1979. Tancinco died in Calbayog on 22 September 2025 at the age of 92.

Catholic Church titles
Preceded by Cipriano Urgel y Villahermosa	Bishop of Calbayog; 1974–1979	Succeeded by Sincero Barcenilla Lucero
