= Julio Rosales =

Filipino Cardinal and the former Archbishop of Cebu

His Eminence Julio Rosales
- Cardinal, Archbishop of Cebu
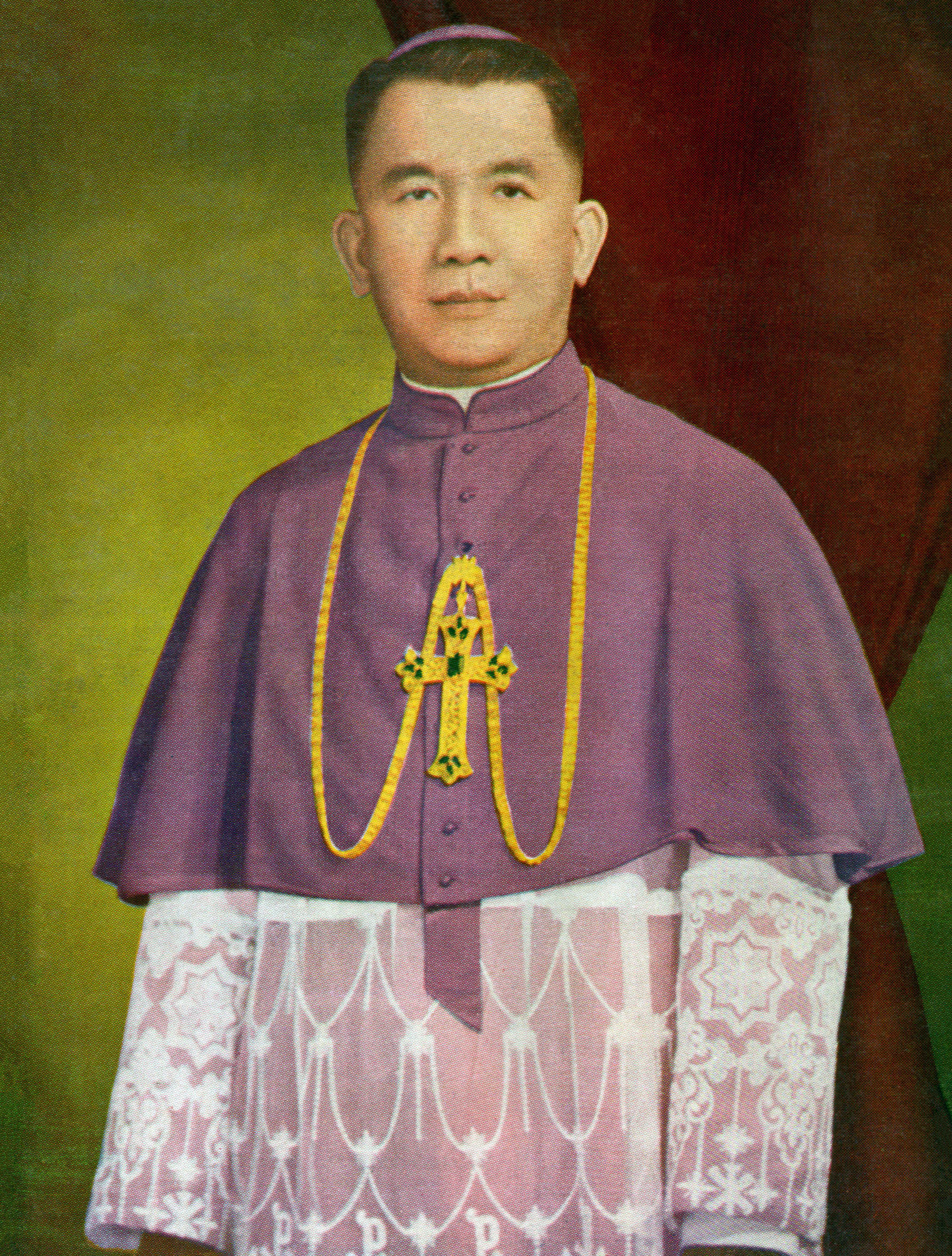
- Cebu Archbishop Julio Rosales, 1950
- Province: Cebu
- See: Cebu
- Installed: December 17, 1949
- Term ended: August 24, 1982
- Predecessor: Gabriel M. Reyes
- Successor: Ricardo Vidal

Orders
- Ordination: June 2, 1929
- Consecration: September 21, 1946 by Guglielmo Piani
- Created cardinal: April 28, 1969 by Pope Paul VI
- Rank: Cardinal priest

Personal details
- Born: Julio Ras Rosales; September 18, 1906 Calbayog, Samar, Philippine Islands
- Died: June 2, 1983 (aged 76) Cebu City, Philippines
- Buried: Mausoleum at the Cebu Metropolitan Cathedral
- Denomination: Catholic
- Motto: Te amari faciam ("I will love you")
- Coat of arms: Julio Rosales's coat of arms

Ordination history
History
Priestly ordination
- Date: June 2, 1929
Episcopal consecration
- Principal consecrator: Guglielmo Piani SDB
- Co-consecrators: Manuel Mascariñas y Morgia; Miguel Acebedo y Flores
- Date: September 21, 1946
- Place: Palo, Leyte
Cardinalate
- Elevated by: Pope Paul VI
- Date: April 28, 1969
Episcopal succession
Bishops consecrated by Julio Rosales y Ras as principal consecrator
- Teofilo Camomot: May 29, 1955
- Epifanio S. Belmonte: October 24, 1955
- Manuel S. Salvador: January 19, 1967
- Concordio Maria Sarte: July 22, 1973
- José Crisologo Sorra: August 28, 1974
- Pedro Dean: January 25, 1978
- Jesus Dosado: January 25, 1978
- Salvador Trane Modesto: May 3, 1979
- Patricio Hacbang Alo: June 7, 1981
- Christian Vicente Noel: November 30, 1981

Julio Ras Rosales (September 18, 1906 – June 2, 1983), was a Filipino cardinal of the Catholic Church. He was the second archbishop of Cebu, and a former bishop of Tagbilaran.

== Early life and ministry ==
He was born in Calbayog, Samar on September 18, 1906. He was a child of Basilio Rosales and Aqueda Ras. His brother, Decoroso Rosales, later became a senator of the Philippines, while his nephew Pedro Dean followed his footsteps and became archbishop of Palo.

Aspiring to become a priest, he entered the San Vicente de Paul Seminary in Calbayog, which was then under the management of the Vincentians. He was ordained by Bishop Sofronio Hacbang in his hometown on June 2, 1929. He started his ministry as an assistant parish priest in Catbalogan, Samar, and then for eleven years he was assistant parish priest at Tacloban, Leyte. He also served as director of the Tacloban Institute.

== Episcopacy ==
In 1946, Pope Pius XII appointed him as the first bishop of Tagbilaran. He was consecrated bishop of Tagbilaran on September 21, 1946 by Apostolic Delegate Guglielmo Piani, with Palo Bishop Manuel Mascariñas and Calbayog Bishop Miguel Acevedo as co-consecrators. As bishop of Tagbilaran, he facilitated the establishment of the Holy Name College by asking the help of the Divine Word Missionaries in forming a school in his diocese. To increase the clergy of his diocese, he also established the Immaculate Heart of Mary Seminary in 1948.

On December 17, 1949, Rosales was appointed to the metropolitan see of Cebu. During his reign, in 1965, Cebu hosted the celebrations for the 400th anniversary of the Christianization of the Philippines.

== College of cardinals ==
Rosales was elevated to the college of cardinals by Pope Paul VI in the consistory of April 28, 1969 and given the titular church of Sacro Cuore di Gesù agonizzante a Vitinia. He also participated in both conclaves of 1978. He resigned the pastoral government of his archdiocese, on August 24, 1982 and died less than a year later in Cebu City, his beloved episcopal city.

Styles of Julio Rosales y Ras
- Reference style: His Eminence
- Spoken style: Your Eminence
- Religious style: Monsignor
- Informal style: Cardinal
- See: Cebu

== Burial ==
Julio Rosales is buried at the mausoleum of the Roman Catholic Metropolitan Cathedral in Cebu City, Philippines. His mementos are currently on display at the Cathedral Museum of Cebu.

Catholic Church titles
Preceded by Juan C. Sison	CBCP President; 1961–1966	Succeeded by Lino R. Gonzaga
Preceded by Teopisto Valderrama Alberto	CBCP President; 1974–1976	Succeeded by Jaime Sin
Preceded by Gabriel M. Reyes	Archbishop of Cebu; 1949–1982	Succeeded by Ricardo Vidal
Preceded by Title created	Cardinal-Priest of Sacro Cuore di Gesù a Vitinia; 1969–1983	Succeeded by Mario Luigi Ciappi
