= Ricardo Vidal =

Filipino Catholic cardinal (1931–2017)

His Eminence Ricardo J. Vidal D.D.
- Cardinal, Archbishop Emeritus of Cebu
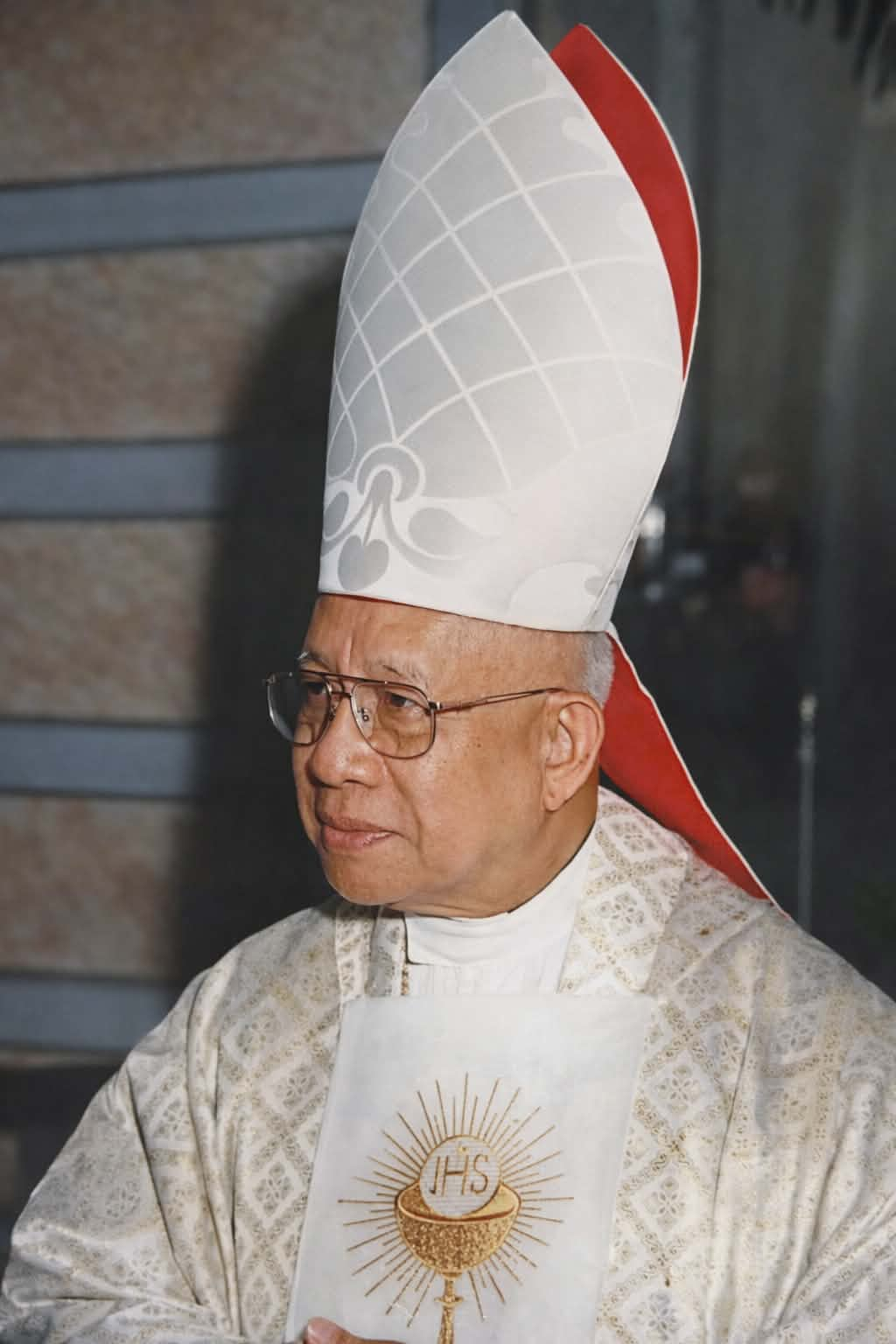
- Cardinal Vidal in 2001
- Province: Cebu
- Appointed: April 13, 1981 (Coadjutor)
- Installed: August 24, 1982
- Retired: October 15, 2010
- Predecessor: Julio Rosales
- Successor: José S. Palma
- Other post: Cardinal-Priest of Santi Pietro e Paolo a Via Ostiense
- Previous posts: Coadjutor Bishop of Malolos and Titular Bishop of Claternae (1971–1973); Archbishop of Lipa (1973–1981)

Orders
- Ordination: March 17, 1956 by Alfredo Obviar
- Consecration: November 30, 1971 by Carmine Rocco
- Created cardinal: May 25, 1985 by Pope John Paul II
- Rank: Cardinal-Priest

Personal details
- Born: Ricardo Tito Jamin Vidal; February 6, 1931 Mogpog, Marinduque, Philippine Islands
- Died: October 18, 2017 (aged 86) Cebu City, Philippines
- Buried: October 26, 2017; Cebu Metropolitan Cathedral Mausoleum, Cebu City, Philippines
- Denomination: Roman Catholic
- Residence: Cebu City
- Motto: Viam veritatis elegi (lit. 'I have chosen the way of truth')
- Coat of arms: Ricardo J. Vidal's coat of arms

Ordination history
History
Diaconal ordination
- Ordained by: Alfredo Obviar (Lucena AA)
- Date: September 24, 1955
- Place: Lucena, Quezon
Priestly ordination
- Ordained by: Alfredo Obviar (Lucena AA)
- Date: March 17, 1956
Episcopal consecration
- Consecrated by: Carmine Rocco (Philippines Apos. Nunc.)
- Date: November 30, 1971
Cardinalate
- Elevated by: Pope John Paul II
- Date: May 25, 1985
Episcopal succession
Bishops consecrated by Ricardo Vidal as principal consecrator
- Leopoldo Tumulak: March 16, 1987
- Maximiano T. Cruz: December 1, 1987
- Precioso Cantillas, SDB: July 12, 1995
- Arturo Bastes, SVD: August 21, 1997
- John F. Du: January 6, 1998
- Antonieto Cabajog: March 16, 1999
- Julito Cortes: January 8, 2002
- Isabelo C. Abarquez: February 18, 2003
- Patricio Buzon, SDB: February 19, 2003
- Emmanuel Cabajar, C.Ss.R: February 19, 2003
- Roberto Mallari: March 27, 2006
- Marlo Peralta: March 31, 2006
- Francisco M. Padilla: May 23, 2006
- Styles
- Reference style: His Eminence
- Spoken style: Your Eminence
- Religious style: Monsignor
- Informal style: Cardinal
- See: Cebu

Ricardo Tito Jamin Vidal (Note: Latin: Ricardus Titus Vidal; Spanish: Ricardo Tito Vidal y Jamín) (February 6, 1931 – October 18, 2017) was a Filipino prelate of the Catholic Church in the Philippines. Made a cardinal in 1985, he was archbishop of Cebu from 1982 to 2010.

== Early life and education ==
Vidal was born on February 6, 1931, in Mogpog, Marinduque to Faustino S. Vidal of Pila, Laguna, and Natividad Jamin of Mogpog, the fifth of six siblings. In 1937, Vidal received his first communion at the International Eucharistic Celebration. He attended Mogpog Elementary School for his primary education.

Vidal studied at the Minor Seminary of the Most Holy Rosary (now Our Lady of Mount Carmel Seminary) in Sariaya, Quezon, and at the Saint Francis de Sales Seminary in Lipa, Batangas, where he studied philosophy. He also studied theology at the San Carlos Seminary in Makati, Metro Manila.

== Ministry ==
Vidal was ordained a deacon on September 24, 1955, and as a priest on March 17, 1956, on Lucena, Quezon Province, by Bishop Alfredo Obviar. Vidal became the spiritual director of the Our Lady of Mount Carmel Seminary in Sariaya, Quezon.

He was appointed coadjutor bishop of Malolos on November 30, 1971 and was consecrated bishop by Archbishop Carmine Rocco, Apostolic Nuncio to the Philippines. Less than two years later, he was appointed archbishop of Lipa by Pope Paul VI. Pope John Paul II appointed Vidal coadjutor archbishop of Cebu in 1981, and he became archbishop there on August 24, 1982, succeeding Cardinal Julio Rosales.

Vidal was a frequent collaborator with Bishop Teofilo Camomot and bore witness to the native Cebuano prelate's claimed miraculous deed. Vidal also helped found the Catechist Missionaries of St. Theresa, a Catholic religious congregation.

Vidal was president of the Catholic Bishops' Conference of the Philippines (CBCP) from 1986 to 1987 and became chairman of the CBCP-Episcopal Commission on the Clergy in 1989. He was appointed the Federation of Asian Bishops' Conferences' convenor of the Standing Committee (1985 to 1994). He was a delegate to the Synod on Reconciliation (1983), the Extraordinary Synod (1985), the Synod on Priests (1991), and the Synod on Religious Life (1994), and also served as president delegate at the 1989 Synod on the Laity. He was also a member of the Permanent Council of the Synod from 1989 to 1994. Vidal's posts in the Roman Curia included memberships in the Congregation for the Evangelization of Peoples, the Congregation for Catholic Education, and the Pontifical Council for the Pastoral Care of Health Care Workers.

=== College of Cardinals ===
On May 25, 1985, he became cardinal-priest of Ss. Pietro e Paolo a Via Ostiense. He was one of the cardinal electors who participated in the 2005 papal conclave that elected Pope Benedict XVI, the only Filipino cardinal to do so, because Cardinal Jaime Sin's poor health prevented him from attending.

=== Leadership in the Philippines ===
Vidal and the Cardinal Archbishop of Manila Jaime Sin supported the 1986 Philippine People Power Revolution. As archbishop of Cebu and president of the Catholic Bishops' Conference of the Philippines, Vidal led the rest of the Philippine prelates and made a joint declaration against the government and the results of the snap election.

In 1989 President Corazon Aquino asked Vidal to convince General Jose Comendador, who was sympathetic to the rebel forces fighting her government, to surrender peacefully. His intervention averted what could have been a bloody coup.

In 2001, during the 2001 People Power Revolution, Vidal convinced President Joseph Estrada to step down. Estrada was later detained. Vidal along with Senator Manny Villar and House Speaker Jose de Venecia Jr. wrote a letter appealing to President Gloria Macapagal Arroyo to grant pardon to Estrada in the "spirit of national unity and reconciliation". Estrada was pardoned and released from detention on October 26, 2007.

== Later life and death ==
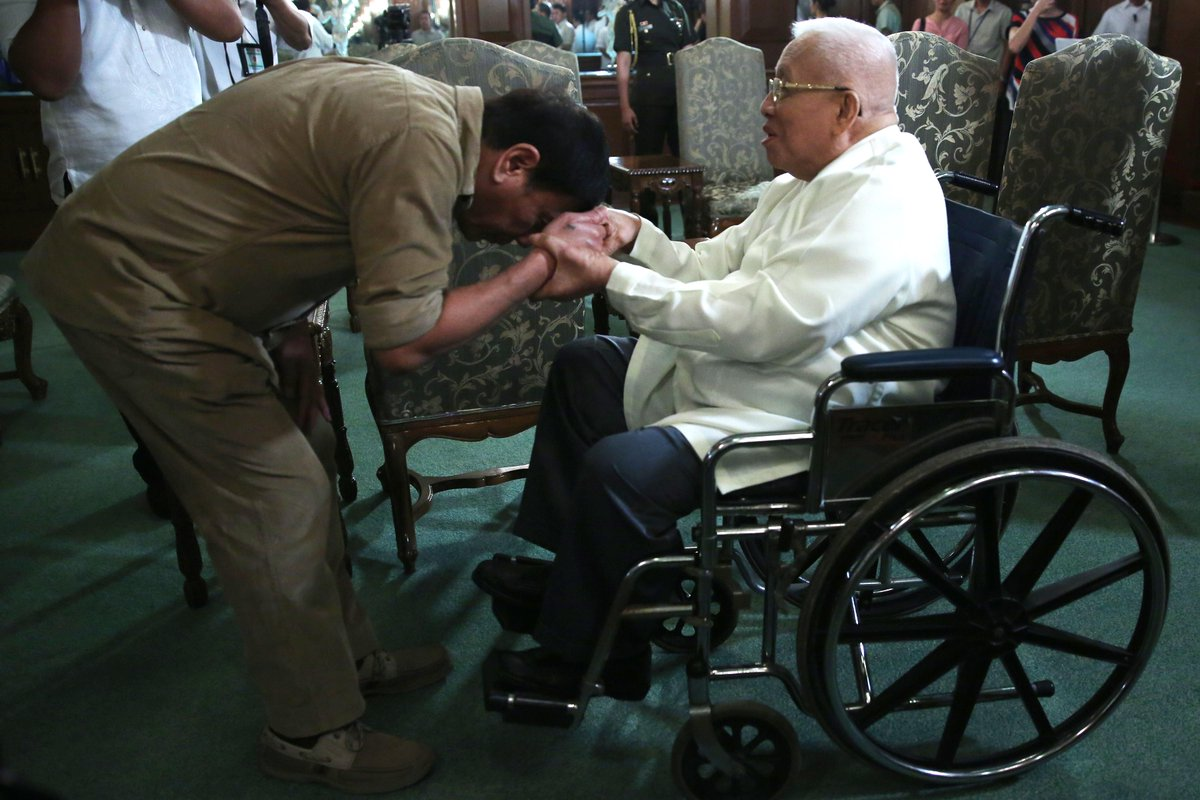
Vidal receives the mano gesture of respect from newly-elected president Rodrigo Duterte on July 13, 2016.

Pope Benedict XVI accepted Vidal's resignation as archbishop of Cebu on October 15, 2010. He was succeeded by Archbishop Jose S. Palma of Palo.

In retirement, Vidal lived in Sto. Niño Village in Cebu City. He continued presiding at Masses and attending events organized by the Archdiocese of Cebu.

He underwent a coronary angiogram procedure and had a pacemaker installed in 2004. He experienced a mild stroke on September 23, 2013. He was confined to the hospital multiple times beginning in 2014 for pneumonia. He was confined in a hospital in May 2017 for the same illness, given the Catholic sacrament of anointing of the sick on October 11, and died on October 18.

== Recognition ==
Vidal received recognition from the government. On December 7, 2010, the Senate of the Philippines recognized his service to Cebu by Senate Resolution NO. 306: "It is resolved by the Senate, to honor Ricardo Cardinal Vidal, Archbishop of Cebu, for his service to the people of Cebu, providing spiritual leadership and inspiration, helping the community avert or survive several crises and conflicts, often acting as a peacekeeper and giving the voice of moderation amid clashing views and interests in local and national issues."

He also received recognition from the House of Representatives through House Resolution 593. The Province of Cebu gave the highest award that a province could give, the Order of Lapu-lapu. The cities of Cebu and Talisay made him an "adopted son" of the two localities. In March 2009 the University of the Visayas granted him the title of Doctor of Humanities honoris causa.

== Calls for canonization ==
There have been calls for Vidal to be proclaimed a saint. Vidal was influential in pushing for the canonization of several Filipinos, especially Pedro Calungsod. Filipino Catholics have urged that Vidal receive the same honor. During the necrological service at Vidal's wake, the Cebu City North District Representative, Raul del Mar, called on Catholic Church officials to work for the canonization of Vidal, whom he says lived a life of holiness and noteworthy humility that is worthy of sainthood. Among those who claim that the archbishop lived a holy life was Senator Vicente Sotto III, who said to the news reporters as he showed a rosary given to him by Vidal, "Now, I have a new friend in heaven. He is praying for me."

== See also ==
- Cardinals created by Pope John Paul II

== Notes ==
Catholic Church titles
Preceded by Antonio Lloren Mabutas	CBCP President; December 1, 1985 – November 30, 1987	Succeeded by Leonardo Legaspi
Preceded by Alejandro Olalia	Archbishop of Lipa; August 22, 1973 – April 13, 1981	Succeeded by Mariano Gaviola
Preceded by Julio Rosales	Archbishop of Cebu; August 24, 1982 – October 15, 2010	Succeeded by Jose S. Palma
Preceded by Franjo Šeper	Cardinal-Priest of Ss. Pietro e Paolo a Via Ostiense; May 25, 1985 – October 18, 2017	Succeeded by Pedro Barreto
