= José S. Palma =

Filipino archbishop

His Excellency, The Most Reverend José Serofia Palma D.D., S.Th.D.
- Archbishop Emeritus of Cebu
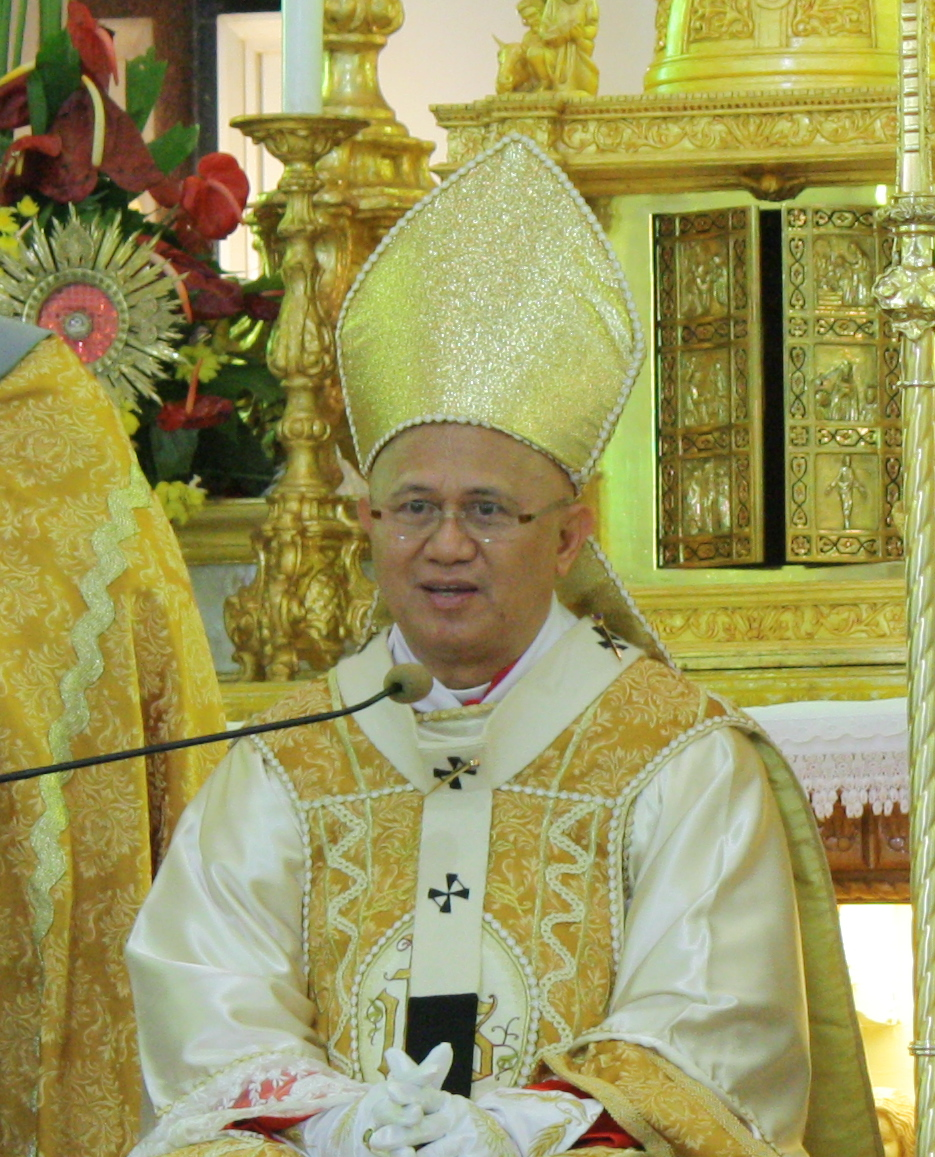
- Archbishop José S. Palma in 2023
- Church: Latin Church
- Province: Cebu
- See: Cebu
- Appointed: October 15, 2010
- Installed: January 13, 2011
- Retired: September 30, 2025
- Predecessor: Ricardo Vidal
- Successor: Alberto S. Uy
- Previous posts: Bishop of Calbayog (1999–2006); Metropolitan Archbishop of Palo (2006–2010)

Orders
- Ordination: August 21, 1976 by Alberto Jover Piamonte
- Consecration: January 13, 1998 by Gian Vincenzo Moreni

Personal details
- Born: José Serofia Palma; March 19, 1950 (age 76) Dingle, Iloilo, Philippines
- Denomination: Catholicism
- Education: St. Vincent Ferrer Seminary; St. Joseph Regional Seminary; Pontifical and Royal University of Santo Tomas; Pontifical University of Saint Thomas Aquinas
- Motto: Non nobis Domine (Latin for 'Not to us O Lord') (Note: Psalm 115:1)
- Signature: José Serofia Palma's signature

- Coat of arms: José Serofia Palma's coat of arms

Ordination history
History
Priestly ordination
- Ordained by: Alberto Jover Piamonte
Episcopal consecration
- Principal consecrator: Gian Vincenzo Moreni
- Co-consecrators: Alberto Jover Piamonte; Fernando Capalla
Episcopal succession
Bishops consecrated by José S. Palma as principal consecrator
- Patrick Daniel Y. Parcon: August 22, 2014
- Dennis C. Villarojo: August 10, 2015
- Ruben C. Labajo: August 19, 2022

Styles of José S. Palma
- Reference style: The Most Reverend
- Spoken style: Your Excellency
- Religious style: Archbishop

José Serofia Palma (born March 19, 1950) is a Filipino prelate who served as Metropolitan Archbishop of Cebu from 2011 to 2025. He had previously served as Metropolitan Archbishop of Palo in Leyte from 2006 to 2010, and as president of the Catholic Bishops' Conference of the Philippines from 2011 to 2013.

== Early life ==
Palma was born in Dingle, Iloilo, in the Archdiocese of Jaro. He studied philosophy at St. Vincent Ferrer Seminary and theological studies at the St. Joseph Regional Seminary. He received his licentiate in Sacred Theology at the Pontifical and Royal University of Santo Tomas in Manila, and was ordained a priest for the Archdiocese of Jaro on August 21, 1976.

Palma earned a doctorate from the Pontifical University of Saint Thomas, Angelicum in Rome in 1987 with a dissertation entitled Death as an Act: A Dialogue in Eschatology with Contemporary Theologians.

== Priesthood ==
After a year as assistant priest at the Jaro Cathedral, he taught at his alma mater, St. Vincent Ferrer Seminary. After his studies in Rome, he became rector of the seminary until he was appointed rector of the major seminary of the Metropolitan Province of Jaro-the St. Joseph Regional Seminary, in 1988. Meanwhile, he also held various positions in several diocesan commissions. In 1997 he was made parish priest of the Parish of St Anthony of Padua in Barotac Nuevo, Iloilo (Archdiocese of Jaro). On November 28, 1997, Pope John Paul II appointed him Titular Bishop of Vazari Diddi and Auxiliary Bishop of Cebu. He was consecrated on January 13, 1998. Exactly a year later, he was made Bishop-Ordinary of the See of Calbayog.

== As metropolitan archbishop ==
=== Metropolitan Archbishop of Palo ===
On March 18, 2006, Palma was appointed Metropolitan Archbishop of Palo by Pope Benedict XVI, succeeding Archbishop-Emeritus Pedro R. Dean.

=== Metropolitan Archbishop of Cebu ===
On October 15, 2010, he was appointed Metropolitan Archbishop of Cebu, replacing Cardinal Ricardo Vidal, who had been archbishop for 29 years. He was installed on January 13, 2011, at the Cebu Metropolitan Cathedral. He served as vice-president of the Catholic Bishops Conference of the Philippines from December 1, 2009, until July 11, 2011, on which he was elected president.

In 2018, he was received into the Priestly Fraternity of Saint Dominic, a Third Order under the Order of Preachers.

Pope Francis named him a member of the Pontifical Council for Culture on November 11, 2019.

In December 2024, Archbishop Palma suspended indefinitely the celebration of Traditional Tridentine Mass (TLM) in the Roman Catholic Archdiocese of Cebu until further notice.

After 14 years of leading the Archdiocese of Cebu, Pope Leo XIV accepted his retirement at the age of 75 (the mandatory retirement age for bishops) on July 16, 2025, and appointed Alberto Uy, Bishop of Tagbilaran, as his successor, effective upon Uy's installation on September 30, 2025.

== Notes ==
Catholic Church titles
Preceded by Maximiano Tuazon Cruz	Bishop of Calbayog; March 9, 1999 – March 18, 2006	Succeeded by Isabelo Caiban Abarquez
Preceded by Pedro R. Dean	Archbishop of Palo; May 2, 2006 – January 13, 2011	Succeeded by John F. Du
Preceded by Ricardo Vidal	Archbishop of Cebu; January 13, 2011 – September 30, 2025	Succeeded by Alberto S. Uy
Preceded by Nereo P. Odchimar	CBCP Vice President; December 1, 2009 – November 30, 2011	Succeeded by Socrates Villegas
Preceded by Nereo P. Odchimar	CBCP President; December 1, 2011 – November 30, 2013	Succeeded by Socrates Villegas
