= Diocese of Calbayog =

Roman Catholic diocese in the Philippines

Coordinates: 12.0666°N 124.5950°E

Diocese of Calbayog Dioecesis Calbayogana Diyosesis han Calbayog

Catholic
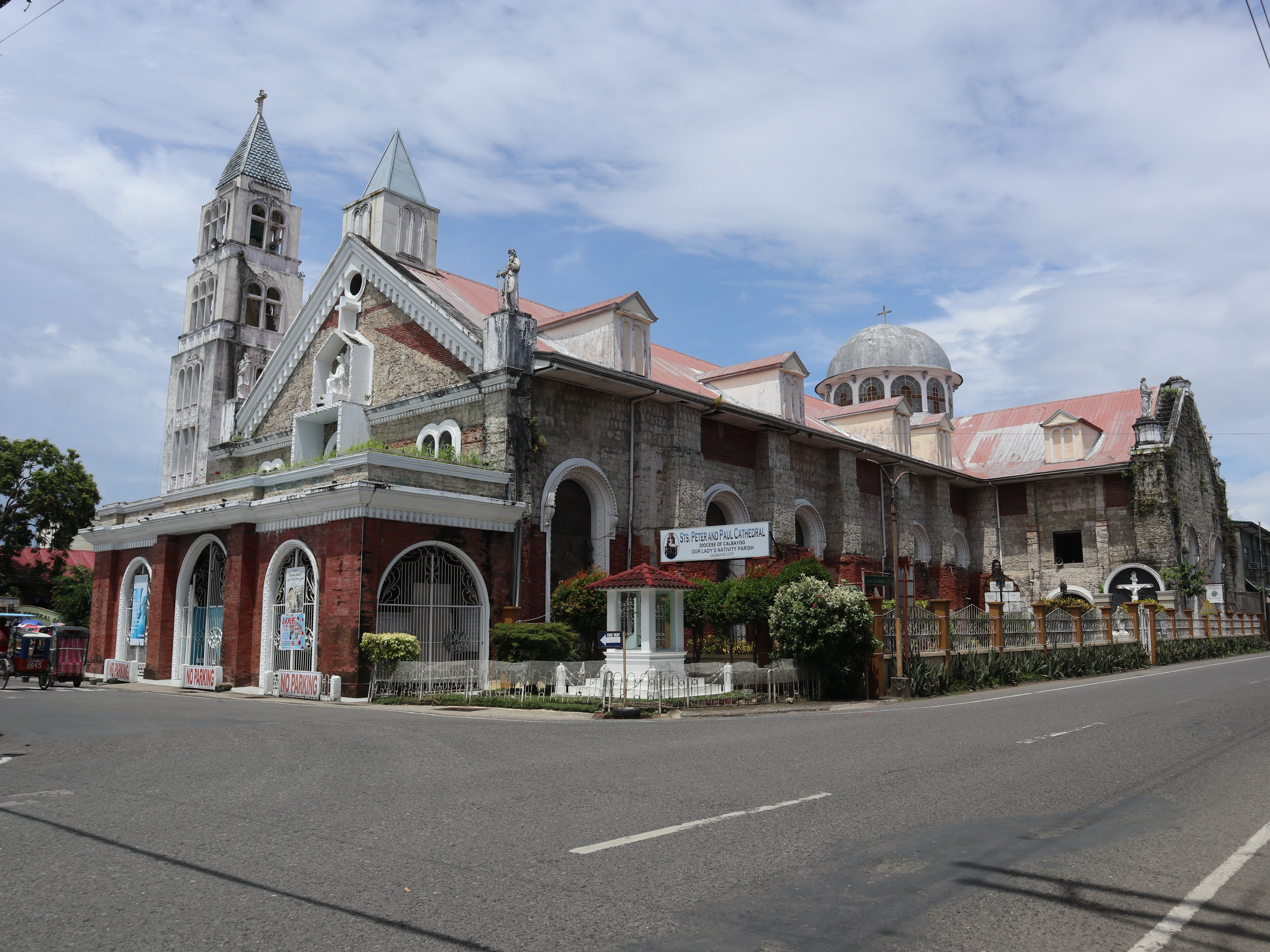
- Calbayog Cathedral

- Coat of arms

Location
- Country: Philippines
- Territory: Western Samar
- Ecclesiastical province: Palo
- Metropolitan: Palo

Statistics
- Area: 5,069 km^{2} (1,957 sq mi)
- Population: Total; Catholics: (as of 2021); 802,000; 753,748 (94%)
- Parishes: 46

Information
- Denomination: Catholic
- Sui iuris church: Latin Church
- Rite: Roman Rite
- Established: April 10, 1910
- Cathedral: Cathedral of Sts. Peter and Paul
- Patron saints: Peter and Paul
- Secular priests: 71

Current leadership
- Pope: Leo XIV
- Bishop: Isabelo C. Abarquez
- Metropolitan Archbishop: John F. Du
- Vicar General: Niceas Abejuela

Former coat of arms of the Diocese of Calbayog, depicting actual wounds instead of gout-de-sang.

The Diocese of Calbayog is a Latin Catholic ecclesiastical territory of the Catholic Church in the Philippines. It is named after its episcopal see, Calbayog, a city on the western side of the province of Samar in the Philippines.

== History ==
Samar and Leyte, two civil provinces in the Visayan group of the Philippines, which include the islands of Balicuatro, Batac, Biliran, Capul, Daram, Homonhon, Leyte, Manicani, Panaon, Samar and several smaller islands, once made up the diocese of Calbayog, now a suffragan of the Metropolitan Archdiocese of Palo. The diocesan Calbayog has a cathedral dedicated to Saints Peter and Paul.

The Diocese of Calbayog is the local church comprising the civil territorial jurisdiction of western Samar Island. The island, the third largest in the Philippines, is composed of three provinces: Northern Samar with Catarman as capital, Eastern Samar with Borongan as capital, and the Samar Province with Catbalogan as the capital. The City of Calbayog is where the Cathedral of the diocese has been located since its ecclesiastical foundation on April 10, 1910, by Pope Pius X. The new diocese was before made up of the whole Samar and Leyte islands.

On April 28, 1934, Pope Pius XI promulgated an apostolic constitution with the incipit Romanorum Pontificum semper, separating the dioceses of Cebu, Calbayog, Jaro, Bacolod, Zamboanga, and Cagayan de Oro from the ecclesiastical province of Manila. The same constitution elevated the diocese of Cebu into an archdiocese while placing all the newly separated dioceses under a new ecclesiastical province with Cebu as the new metropolitan see.

Subsequently, Palo was ceded from Calbayog as a separate diocese in 1937, Borongan in 1965, and Catarman in 1975. The historical vicissitudes of the Diocese of Calbayog cannot be fully appreciated apart from the history of the early evangelical works of the first missionaries who came to Samar. The first Jesuit missionaries reached Leyte and Samar in 1595, the islands subsequently forming part of the Diocese of Cebu until erected into a separate diocese on 10 April 1910. The first bishop was Pablo Singzon de la Anunciacion.

It was transferred to the ecclesiastical province of the Archdiocese of Palo, which was promoted to a Metropolitan Archdiocese on November 15, 1982.

== Local Ordinaries ==
No	Name	In office	Coat of arms
1.	Pablo Singzon de la Anunciacion	12 April 1910 Appointed - 9 Aug. 1920 Died	
2.	Sofronio Hacbang y Gaborni	22 Feb. 1923 Appointed - 3 April 1937 Died	
3.	Miguel Acebedo y Flores	6 Dec 1937 Appointed - 25 July 1958 Died	
4.	Manuel P. Del Rosario †	25 July 1958 Succeeded - 11 Dec. 1961 Appointed, Bishop of Malolos	
5.	Cipriano Urgel y Villahermosa †	22 Mar 1962 Appointed - 12 April 1973 Appointed, Bishop of Palo	
6.	Ricardo Pido Tancinco †	8 March 1974 Appointed - 21 April 1979 Resigned	
7.	Sincero Barcenilla Lucero †	10 Dec. 1979 Appointed - 11 Oct. 1984 Resigned	
8.	Maximiano Tuazon Cruz	20 Dec. 1994 Appointed - 13 Jan. 1999 Retired	
9.	Jose Serofia Palma	13 Jan 1999 Appointed - 18 March 2006 Appointed, Archbishop of Palo	
10.	Isabelo Caiban Abarquez	5 Jan. 2007 Appointed - present	

== Sources and references ==
- GCatholic.org, with episcopal incumbent biographies
