= Isabelo Caiban Abarquez =

Filipino prelate

Most Reverend Isabelo Caiban Abarquez
- Bishop of Calbayog
- Archdiocese: Palo
- Diocese: Calbayog
- Appointed: 5 January 2007
- Predecessor: Jose S. Palma
- Successor: Incumbent
- Previous posts: Auxiliary Bishop of Cebu and Auxiliary Bishop of Palo

Orders
- Ordination: 23 June 1987 by Ricardo Vidal
- Consecration: 18 February 2003 by Ricardo Vidal

Personal details
- Born: 8 July 1959 (age 66) Panlaan, Dumanjug, Cebu, Philippines
- Denomination: Roman Catholic
- Motto: "Regnare Christum Volumus"
- Coat of arms

Isabelo Caiban Abarquez is the current serving Bishop of the Roman Catholic Diocese of Calbayog, Philippines.

== Early life ==
Isabelo was born on 8 July 1959, in Panlaan, Dumanjug, Cebu, Philippines. One of the sons of San Vicente Ferrer Parish of Bitoon, Dumanjug, Cebu, he also served as Team Moderator of Cebu Metropolitan Cathedral when he was still an auxiliary bishop of Cebu and rector of the Diocesan Seminary San Carlos Seminary College before he was consecrated bishop.

== Priesthood ==
He was ordained a priest of Cebu on 23 June 1987 by Ricardo Vidal.

== Episcopate ==
On 27 December 2002 he was appointed auxiliary bishop of Cebu, Philippines, and titular bishop of Talaptula. He was ordained a bishop on 18 February 2003 at Cebu Metropolitan Cathedral by Ricardo Vidal. On 19 June 2004 he was appointed auxiliary bishop of Palo, Philippines. He was appointed Bishop of Calbayog, Philippines, on 5 January 2007 and installed on 8 March 2007.
