= John F. Du =

20th and 21st-century Philippine Catholic archbishop

The Most Reverend John F. Du D.D.
- Archbishop John F. Du, D.D
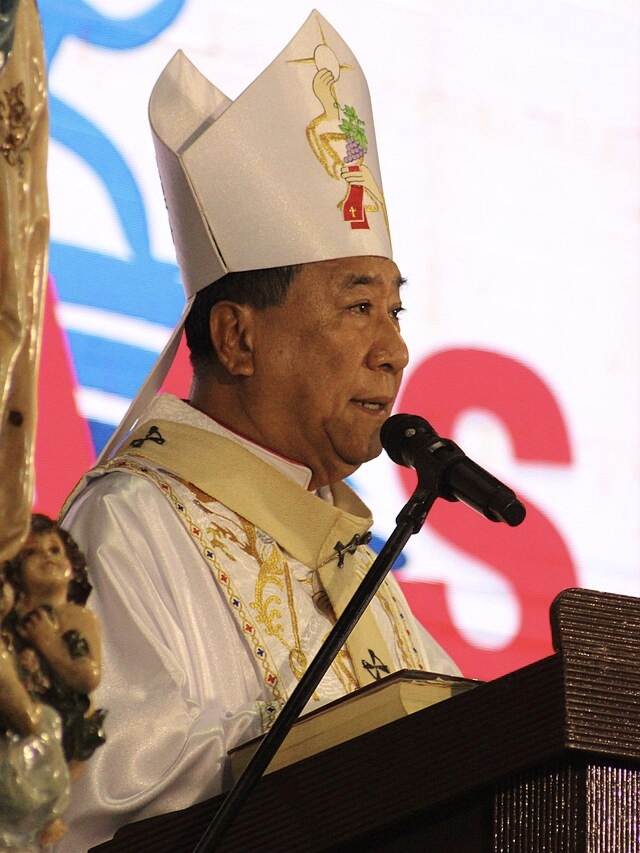
- Archbishop Du in 2025
- Archdiocese: Palo
- Province: Leyte
- See: Palo
- Appointed: February 25, 2012
- Installed: May 9, 2012
- Predecessor: Jose S. Palma
- Successor: Incumbent
- Previous posts: Auxiliary Bishop of Cebu (1997–2001); Bishop of Dumaguete (2001–2012)

Orders
- Ordination: June 1, 1979
- Consecration: January 6, 1998 by Ricardo Vidal

Personal details
- Born: John Forrosuelo Du; October 18, 1954 (age 72) Bantayan, Cebu, Philippines
- Denomination: Catholic
- Motto: Christus lux mea (Latin for 'Christ is my Light')
- Coat of arms: John F. Du's coat of arms

Ordination history
History
Episcopal consecration
- Principal consecrator: Cardinal Ricardo Vidal
- Co-consecrators: Emilio Bataclan (Iligan); Christian Vicente Noel (Talibon)
Episcopal succession
Bishops consecrated by John F. Du as principal consecrator
- Oscar Jaime Florencio: September 4, 2015
- Marvyn Maceda: April 2, 2019
- Styles
- Reference style: The Most Reverend
- Spoken style: Your Excellency
- Religious style: Archbishop

John Forrosuelo Du (born October 18, 1954, in Bantayan, Cebu), is a prelate of the Catholic Church in the Philippines. He is the Archbishop of Palo in Leyte, Philippines. He was appointed to a previously vacant see left with the appointment of archbishop Jose S. Palma to the Archdiocese of Cebu.

== Biography ==
John Du was appointed Bishop of Timici. He was ordained priest of Cebu, Philippines on June 1, 1979, after obtaining degrees in philosophy and theology from the San Carlos Seminary College in Cebu and the Divine Word Seminary in Tagaytay City.

In 1997, Pope John Paul II appointed him Auxiliary Bishop of Cebu. He was named Bishop of Dumaguete on April 21, 2001. In 2012 he was CBCP treasurer and chair of the CBCP Pension Plan. The Archdiocese of Palo had 1.2 million Catholics as of 2004 and its suffragan dioceses include Borongan, Calbayog, Catarman and Naval.

== Archbishop of Palo ==
On February 25, 2012, Pope Benedict XVI elevated Du to Archbishop of Palo in succession to Jose S. Palma. Du was installed at Palo Cathedral on May 9, 2012.

Catholic Church titles
Preceded by Angel Lagdameo	Bishop of Dumaguete; July 18, 2001 – February 25, 2012	Succeeded by Julito Cortes
Preceded by Jose S. Palma	Archbishop of Palo; May 9, 2012 – present	Incumbent
