= Cebu Metropolitan Cathedral =

Roman Catholic cathedral in Cebu City, Philippines

- The Metropolitan Cathedral of Cebu and Parish of Saint Vitalis of Milan
- Metropolitanong Katedral sa Sugbo ug Parokya ni San Vidal sa Milan (Cebuano); Catedral Metropolitana de Cebú y Parroquia de San Vidal de Milán (Spanish); Kalakhang Katedral ng Cebu at Parokya ni San Vidal ng Milan (Filipino)
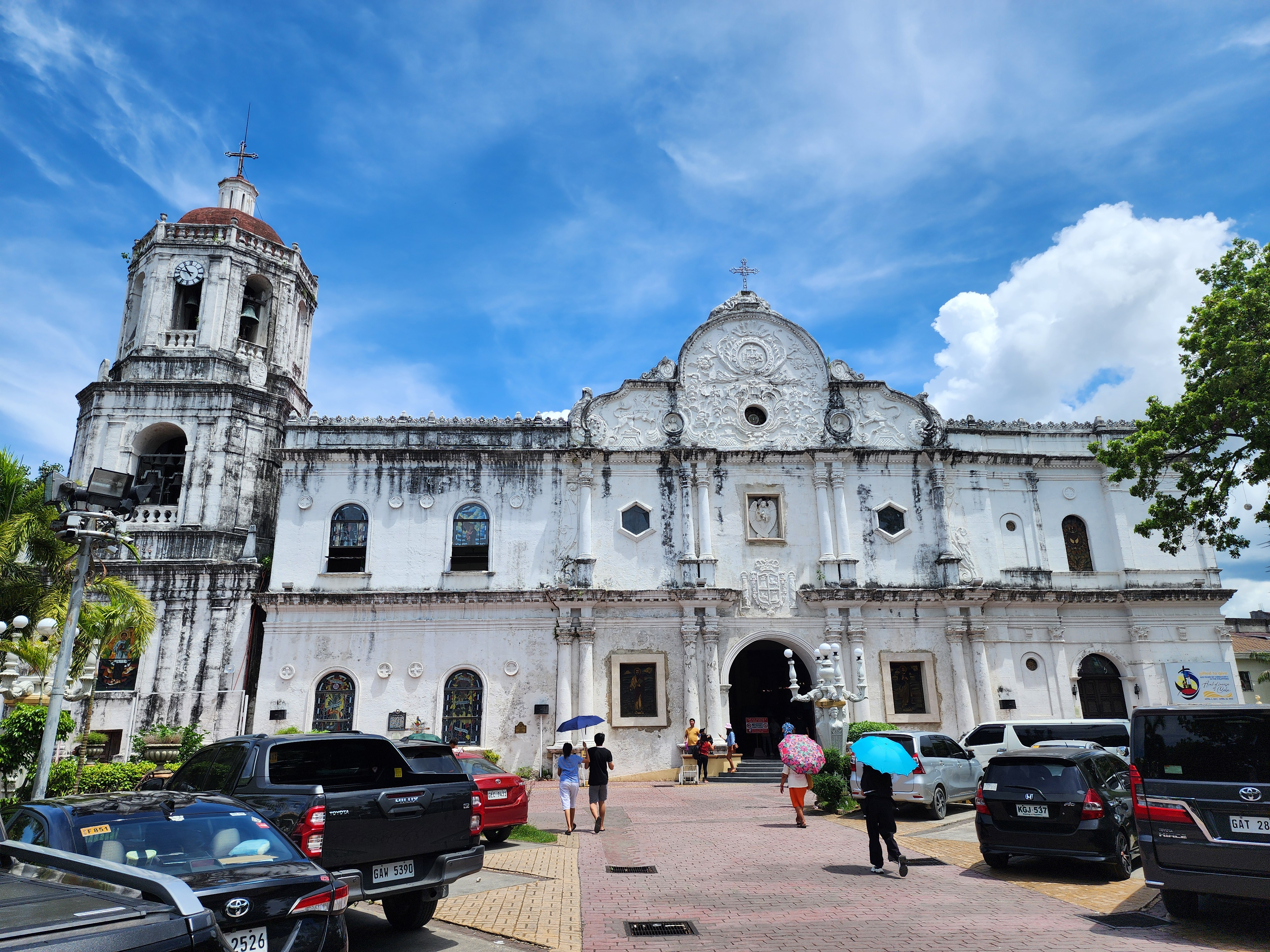
- Cathedral facade in July 2024

- Location in Metro Cebu Location in Cebu Location in the Visayas Location in the Philippines
- 10°17′45″N 123°54′10″E
- Location: Cebu City
- Country: Philippines
- Denomination: Catholic
- Tradition: Roman Rite

History
- Former name(s): Metropolitan Cathedral and Parish of Saint Vitalis and of the Guardian Angels
- Status: Cathedral
- Founded: 1598
- Dedication: Vitalis of Milan; Holy Name of Jesus
- Dedicated: November 18, 1994

Architecture
- Functional status: Active
- Heritage designation: Important Cultural Property
- Designated: March 2023
- Architectural type: Church building
- Style: Spanish Colonial

Administration
- Province: Cebu
- Metropolis: Cebu
- Archdiocese: Cebu
- Deanery: Most Holy Rosary

Clergy
- Archbishop: Alberto Uy
- Rector: Msgr. Vicente Rey Penagunda
- Priest(s): Msgr. Arturo Navales; Fr. Junly Cortes; Fr. Dante Carredo; Fr. Lydio Felizarta; Fr. Josephus Remonde; Fr. Angelito Heraldez

The Metropolitan Cathedral of Cebu and Parish of Saint Vitalis of Milan or commonly known as the Cebu Metropolitan Cathedral (Cebuano: Katedral Metropolitano sa Sugbo) is the ecclesiastical seat of the Metropolitan Archdiocese of Cebu in Cebu City, Philippines. The church is dedicated to Saint Vitalis of Milan. Cebu was established as a diocese on August 14, 1595. It was elevated as a metropolitan archdiocese on April 28, 1934, with the dioceses of Dumaguete, Maasin, Tagbilaran, and Talibon as suffragans. Before being raised as a primatial church in Cebu, the church was one of the first churches in the Philippines (besides the Basilica del Santo Niño), dedicated to St. Vitalis, and built near the fort in April 1565 by Miguel Lopez de Legazpi, Fray Andrés de Urdaneta and Fray Diego de Herrera.

Construction of the cathedral took many years due to frequent interruptions, brought about by lack of funds and other unexpected events. At one time, funds meant for the building of the cathedral were diverted to the Moro wars. The death of an incumbent bishop who spearheaded the construction/reconstruction and vacancies in the office were also factors.

The architecture of the church is typical of Spanish colonial churches in the country, namely, squat and with thick walls to withstand typhoons and other natural calamities. The facade features a trefoil-shaped pediment, which is decorated with carved relieves of floral motifs, an IHS inscription and a pair of griffins. The Spanish Royal Coat of Arms is emblazoned in low relief above the main entrance, reflecting perhaps the contribution of the Spanish monarch to its construction.

During World War II, much of the cathedral was destroyed by Allied bombings of the city. Only the belfry (built in 1835), the façade, and the walls remained. It was quickly rebuilt in the 1950s under the supervision of architect Jose Ma. Zaragosa, during the incumbency of Archbishop Gabriel Reyes.

In 1982, a mausoleum was built at the back of the sacristy at the initiation of Cardinal-Archbishop Julio Rosales. It serves as a final resting place for the remains of Cebu's bishops and clergy. Rosales, who died three months after inauguration of the mausoleum, is interred there along with Archbishop Manuel Salvador, a coadjutor archbishop of Cebu, Archbishop Mariano Gaviola, the archbishop of Lipa (1981–1993), Ricardo Cardinal Vidal, Archbishop of Cebu (1982-2010) and most recently, Emilio Bataclan, Auxiliary Bishop of Cebu (1990-1995 and 2004-2015) and Bishop of Iligan (1995-2004). The remains of Bishop Juan Bautista Gorordo, the first Filipino and Cebuano bishop of Cebu, are also interred there.

The cathedral was renovated for the 75th anniversary celebration on April 28, 2009, of the elevation of Cebu into an archdiocese. An application is pending at the Vatican for the cathedral's elevation into a minor basilica in honor of St. Vitalis, an early Christian martyr. His feast day coincides with the day the image of the Sto. Niño de Cebu was found almost 450 years ago, as well as the anniversary of the elevation of Cebu into an archdiocese.

The present cathedral rector and moderator of the team of pastors is Msgr. Vicente Rey Penagunda, who was appointed in 2025.

Endowed with the status of a full-fledged parish, the Cebu Metropolitan Cathedral comprises the civil barangays of Tinago, San Roque, Santo Niño, T. Padilla, Day-as, Tejero, and Parian, all located in the southeastern and downtown area of Cebu City.

== History ==
=== Church of Saint Vitalis ===
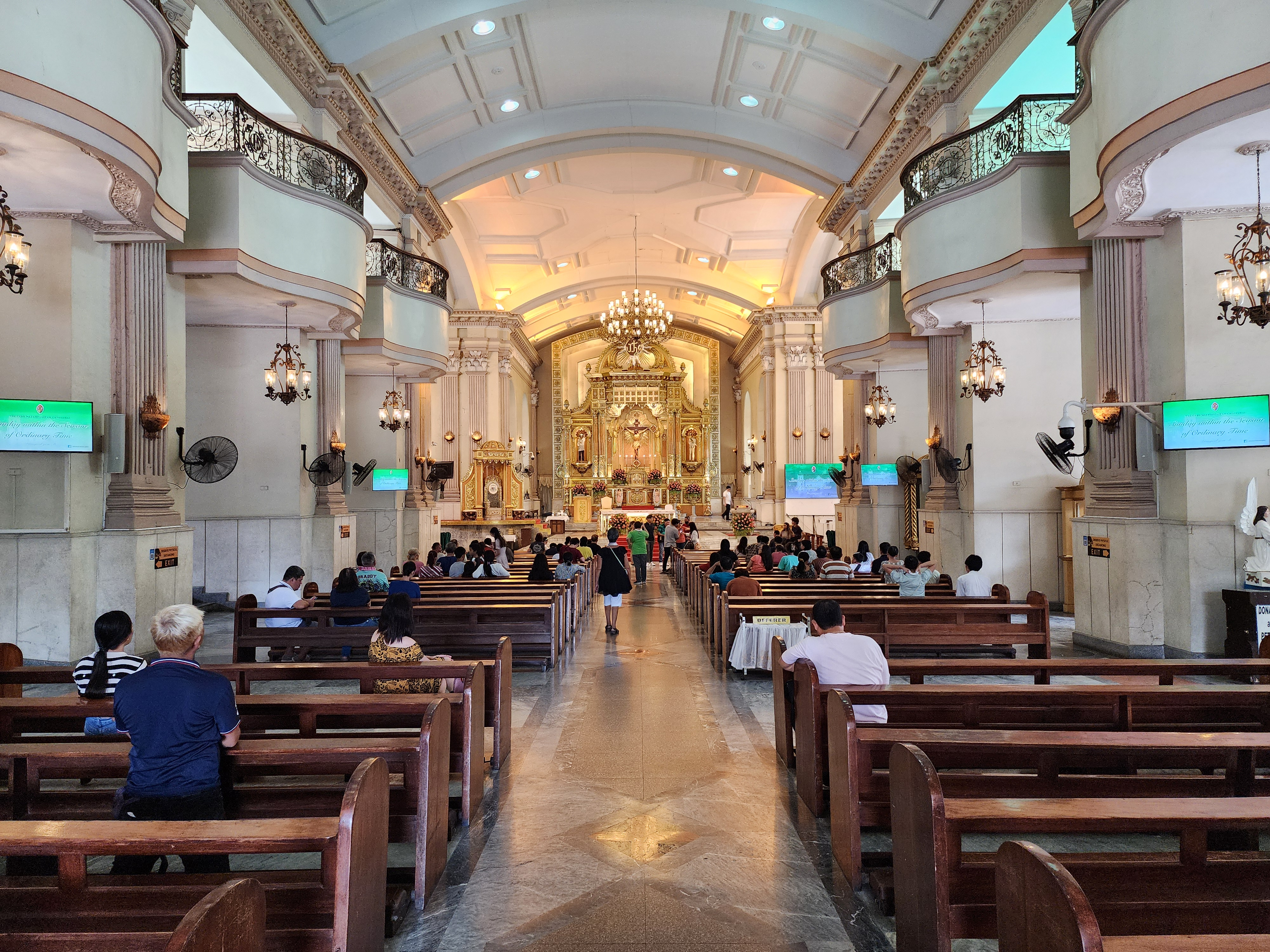
Cathedral interior in 2024

Before dispatching to the Philippines, Legazpi was mandated to build a church near the assigned fort by the Spanish crown. When the Spaniards landed in Cebu, it was the feast of Saint Vitalis (April 28, 1565) and “[t]hey honored the saint as their patron and advocate. His feast is kept every year, and his day observed.” On May 8, 1565, “'[t]he sites for the Spanish quarters and the church [of St. Vitalis] were chosen' and the site of the house where the Sto. Niño was found 'as the site of the Monastery of the Name of Jesus [now Basilica del Santo Niño] . . . and from the said house the child Jesus was brought to the... church in solemn procession, and with the great devotion, rejoicing, and gladness of all the men. Arriving at the church, they all adored it, and placed it on the principal altar, and all vowed to observe, sanctify, and celebrate solemnly as a feast day each year, the day on which it had been found.'” Juan de Medina, prior of the Sto. Niño convent (circa 1603), alluded to the days of discovery of the Sto. Niño and said the tradition was continued that the image was “taken out, and carried in procession to the cathedral, after a paper has been signed, by decree of the justice, that it will be given back to the same religious.”

It is known that the first church is the cathedral now because by 1598 there were two churches besides it in Cebu: San Nicolas (founded in 1584) and the Sto. Niño convent to which the two churches would administer the natives, while the first Cebu bishop Pedro de Agurto would cater to the Spaniards in the St. Vitalis Church chosen as the cathedral. When Cebuana anthropologist Astrid Sala-Boza effectively settled the controversy of the site where the image of the Holy Child was found, she also showed the metropolitan cathedral as the first erected church. Many times the church was destroyed and rebuilt, even being raised as cathedral it suffered many destruction.

=== Cathedral of Saint Vitalis ===
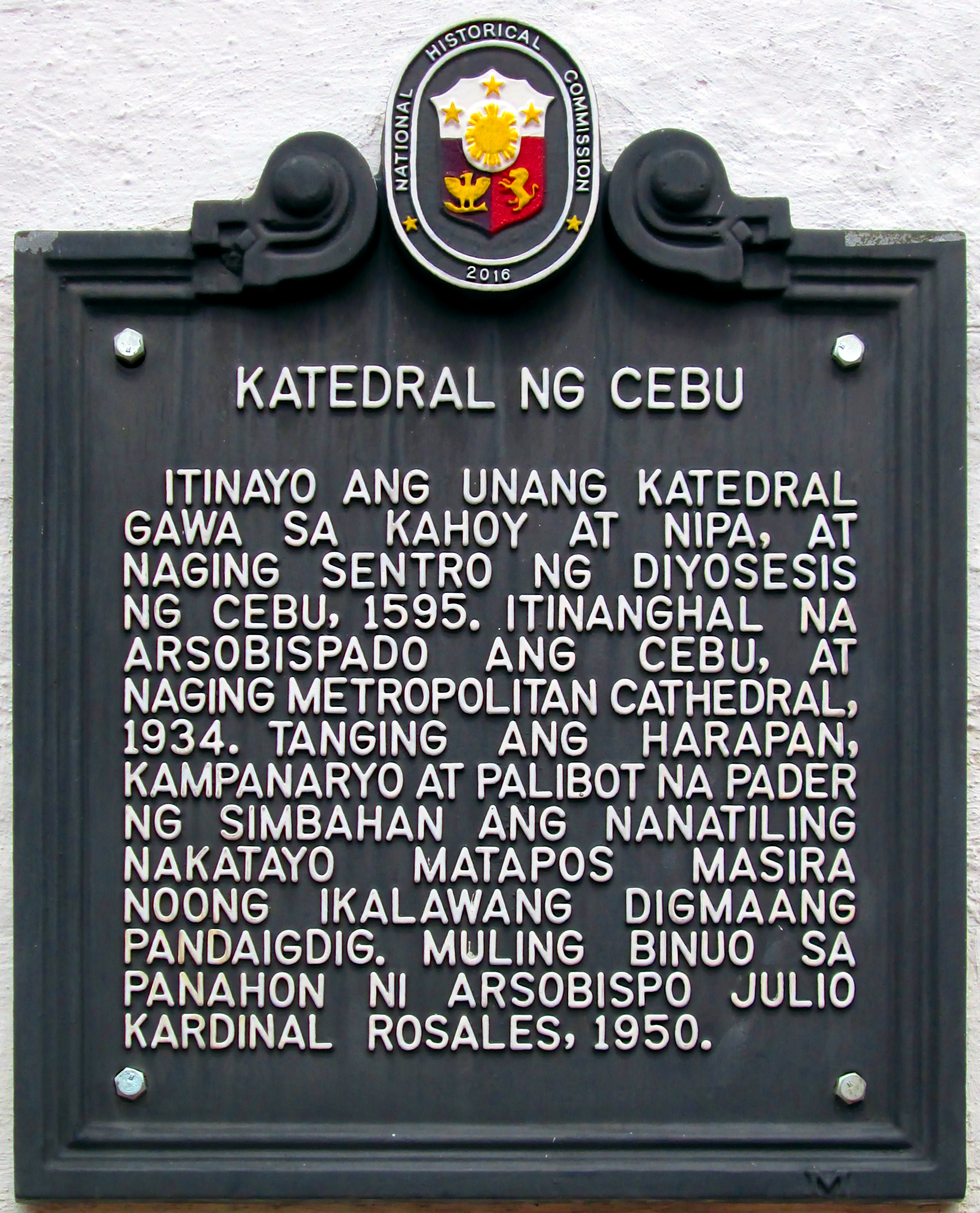
Church NHC historical marker installed in 2016

1598. Bishop Pedro de Agurto (1591–1608), an Augustinian, arrives in Cebu from Mexico, following his appointment as the Diocese of Cebu's first Bishop. He starts to reside in the cathedral.

1665. Bishop Juan Lopez writes the King of Spain requesting that an encomienda with an annual income of 2,000 pesos be assigned to the diocese to subsidize construction of a new cathedral. It is approved five years later. A royal grant of 10,000 pesos is also added, to be given on a staggered basis over the next 10 years.

1689. Having accumulated 17,718 pesos from the encomienda and royal grant, Bishop Diego de Aguilar (1680–92) begins the construction of a cathedral. A typhoon soon destroys the incomplete structure. His successor, Bishop Miguel Bayod (1696–1700) decides to build the foundations for another cathedral.

1692. The annual encomienda income of at least 2,000 pesos assigned to the diocese of Cebu is withheld, putting a heavy toll on the cathedral construction project.

1699-1700. Following a decree, the governor-general sends Juan Antonio de Ayco (reportedly the only mason in Cebu) and master-carpenters Jeronimo Quibon and Jacinto Caba to assess the construction project to estimate how much it would cost to finish it. Probably due to the absence of a competent assessor, the accounting is very confused, with no correct estimate as to how much had already been spent. What is known is that materials for the construction were reportedly already in place, like stones for the pavement, molave beams and posts, and various timbers.

1700. Following the death of Bishop Bayod, the construction of the cathedral is halted.

1719. Bishop Sebastian de Foronda (1723–1728) describes the cathedral as "nothing but a barn overrun by plants and grasses." He sees the futility of continuing the old construction due to its dimensions. He later orders the demolition of the old cathedral.

1719. Juan de Ciscara, a military engineer in Cebu (probably at the invitation of the bishop), draws up plans for a new cathedral. The Ciscara plan shows a rectangular form with three naves and two collateral chapels, suggesting the arms of a transept, and twin bell towers flanking the façade.

1720. With the appointment of a new alcade mayor of Cebu appreciative of the Bishop's concerns over the cathedral, preparations for the fourth attempt at construction, now estimated at 70,523 pesos begins. Materials are gathered and laborers contracted when the new mayor receives an order from Manila to use all disposable funds for the Moro-suppression effort in Mindanao, thus causing the abandonment of the new project. At this time, the alcadia of Cebu owes the diocese 35,336 pesos from the suspended encomienda subsidy.

1733. Bishop Manuel de Osio y Ocampo (1733–1737) commences the fifth attempt at construction of the cathedral begins under the direction of Lazaro Buyco, a master-builder based in Cebu. Some 40,000 blocks of stones are gathered and cut as 10,000 cavanes of lime are stored. The project does not see much headway and progress is slowed down because the foundations of the new cathedral had to be dug deeper as the area on which it stands is far too soft and wet, requiring more time and more money. The new cathedral is now estimated to cost P50,000 to P60,000 more in order to be finished.

1737. Bishop Ocampo dies and construction ceases. The diocese is once again placed under the administration of the Manila Archdiocese while awaiting the appointment of a new bishop. Fr. Miguel Angel Rodriguez, now assigned to oversee the project deems the planned Cebu cathedral as too big for the diocese and decides to cease its construction altogether.

1741. Bishop Protasio Cabezas (1741–1752) assumes as the eleventh bishop of Cebu. He resumes the construction of the cathedral which, against all odds, continues until 1784.

April 28, 1767. Bishop Miguel Lino de Espeleta (1759–1771) sends a letter to the King of Spain informing him of the need for 90,000 pesos to build the cathedral. The bishop also reminds the king of a promise made by his predecessors, apparently referring to the stalled amortizations on payments accrued from the income of the encomienda. As a final appeal, the bishop requests if funds could obtained from Mexico as well as the other islands under the Diocese of Cebu.

June 7, 1785. Bishop Joaquin de Arevalo (1776–1787), successor to Espeleta, informs the king that the amount of 8,000 pesos left by his predecessor to continue work on the cathedral was not enough. The construction, however, is now not only plagued by lack of funds but also by the near-absence of available labor in the city to work on the church.

1786. The façade and principal portions of the new cathedral is finished. Construction now takes on a much more regular pace.

Ruins (foreground) purportedly from a previous construction attempt beside the southern part of the existing cathedral fronting D. Jakosalem St., (formerly Calle del Norte America) circa 1903

1815. Bishop Joaquin Encabe de la Virgen de Sopetran (1805–1818) consecrates the cathedral which he dedicates to the Holy Angels of Custody even as construction never comes to completion and deterioration due to the elements creeps gradually.

1829. Bishop Santos Gomez Marañon (1829–1840) begins his term of office. He deems the cathedral far too deteriorated to be useful and begins plans for a reconstruction. The bishop, better known as priest-builder, supervises the construction of the churches of Oslob and Naga, the Episcopal Palace across the cathedral, the bell tower of Argao and the convent of Sibonga (and most probably the cathedral convent) during his reign.

1863 Following a letter by Bishop Romualdo Jimeno (1846–1872) to Governor General Rafael Echague on the urgent need to repair the cathedral, an architect, Don Domingo de Escondrillas, who is connected with the Office of Public Works based in Cebu is ordered to do a plan for the widening of the cathedral. In his plan, Escondrillas proposes tearing down of the walls of the cruceros and the main altar in order to follow the Greek cross style. The arches are also extended so that it can accommodate 1,400 people more than the 4,300 residents that can be accommodated inside the church. The altar mayor is moved so that it can be seen from any point inside the church. Included in the plan is the renovation of the sacristy. All these would cost 33,298 pesos which Escondrillas describes as economical and will make the church worthy of the honor of being the seat of the Diocese of Cebu.

December 11, 1865. The Administracion Central de Rentas Estancadas de Filipinas authorizes the release of 66,546 escudos for the enlargement of the cathedral by authority of Queen Isabella.

1878-1879. The demolition of the Parian church nearby increases the number of churchgoers (and proceeds from offerings) to the cathedral. The church has had a strained relationship with the cathedral due to its patronage by the local mestizo Chinese elite who lived in and around Parian district, making the church the richest in the diocese.

1886. The cleric Felipe Redondo y Sendino publishes Breve Reseña de lo que fue y de lo que es la Diocesis de Cebu en Islas Filipinas and provides a description of the cathedral in the book: “The Cathedral has thick and strong walls made of mamposteria (rubblework) of 3 varas; it’s crucero measures 73.91 meters in length and its sacristy 17.67 meters in width with the interior part having 12.35 meters in length and its front walls with 21.36. The roofing is made of clay tiles; there is also a spacious sacristy which keeps paintings of the Bishops of the Diocese and a wide ante-sacristy with a room on the upper portion where the religious vessels are kept. Its belfry is also made of mamposteria in three levels reaching 28 meters in height and decorated with a clock."

December 7, 1891. Bishop Martin Garcia Alcocer consecrates the first stone of the new cathedral of Cebu, probably the seventh construction-reconstruction attempt. The project proceeds in earnest but is halted with the onset of the Revolution of 1898.

1904. Bishop Thomas Hendrick (1904–1909), the only American bishop of Cebu, continues the cathedral rebuilding project started by his predecessor.

1909. Bishop Juan Bautista Gorordo (1909–1932) begins his ministry marked by the completion of the cathedral construction.

1933. Following the elevation of the diocese into an archdiocese and the consecration of the new archbishop Gabriel Reyes (1932–1950), the cathedral undergoes renovation. The project is supervised by Chinese Cebuano engineer Gavino Unchuan based on plans made by Cebu and Manila architects Eulogio Tablante Jr., Felino C.T. Lepon and Julio Ancheta. During the renovation, the retablo of the 1860s is torn down and replaced with a simple altar made of Carrara marble imported from Italy. Above the marble altar are placed three stained glass windows portraying the archangels Michael and Gabriel with the Lord in the center. The façade is extended to the camarin delos campaneros or the enclosed passageway to the belfry which used to be the bell-ringer's quarters, thus making the church look even bigger. The entire church is also plastered with cement covering the walls which are painted later.

1940. The newly renovated cathedral is consecrated by Archbishop Gabriel Reyes.

September 12, 1944. USAFFE air raids on Cebu commence. Among the bombing casualties are the recently renovated cathedral and the Episcopal Palace across, with its contents of centuries-old archives and records of the archdiocese lost forever.

1945. Archbishop Reyes begins the reconstruction of the bombed cathedral, with only its façade, walls and belfry still intact.

1993. Under the incumbency of Manuel Salvador as parish priest, the cathedral once again undergoes a major renovation in preparation for the visit of Pope John Paul II to the Philippines for the 400th anniversary of the founding of the Archdiocese of Manila and the dioceses of Cebu, Nueva Caceres, and Nueva Segovia.

November 18, 1994. Cardinal-Archbishop Ricardo Vidal consecrates the cathedral on to the Most Holy Name of Jesus, recalling the days when Cebu was called Ciudad del Santisimo Nombre de Jesus.

2008-2009. The cathedral undergoes another major renovation in time for the 75th anniversary celebration of the archdiocese on April 28, 2009. An application was also sent to the Vatican for its elevation into a minor basilica.

2010. The cathedral underwent a minor renovation which involved the cleaning of the facade for the installation of Jose S. Palma as the new archbishop of Cebu, succeeding Cardinal Ricardo Vidal who had been archbishop for 29 years.

October 15, 2013. The cathedral has been closed to the public after a magnitude 7.2 earthquake hit Visayas which also destroyed several century-old churches in the island such as Loboc Church, Baclayon Church, and the Sto. Nino de Cebu Minor Basilica.

December 13, 2015. The Jubilee Door of Mercy of the cathedral was opened in local observance of the Extraordinary Jubilee of Mercy proclaimed by Pope Francis. It was closed on November 20, 2016, coinciding the Feast of Christ the King.

January 27, 2016. The cathedral became one of the venues of the parish encounter during the 51st International Eucharistic Congress wherein the local parishioners were able to celebrate the Mass with and interact with the international delegates of the congress. Michael Kennedy, Bishop of Armidale, New South Wales in Australia, presided the Mass.

== Gallery ==
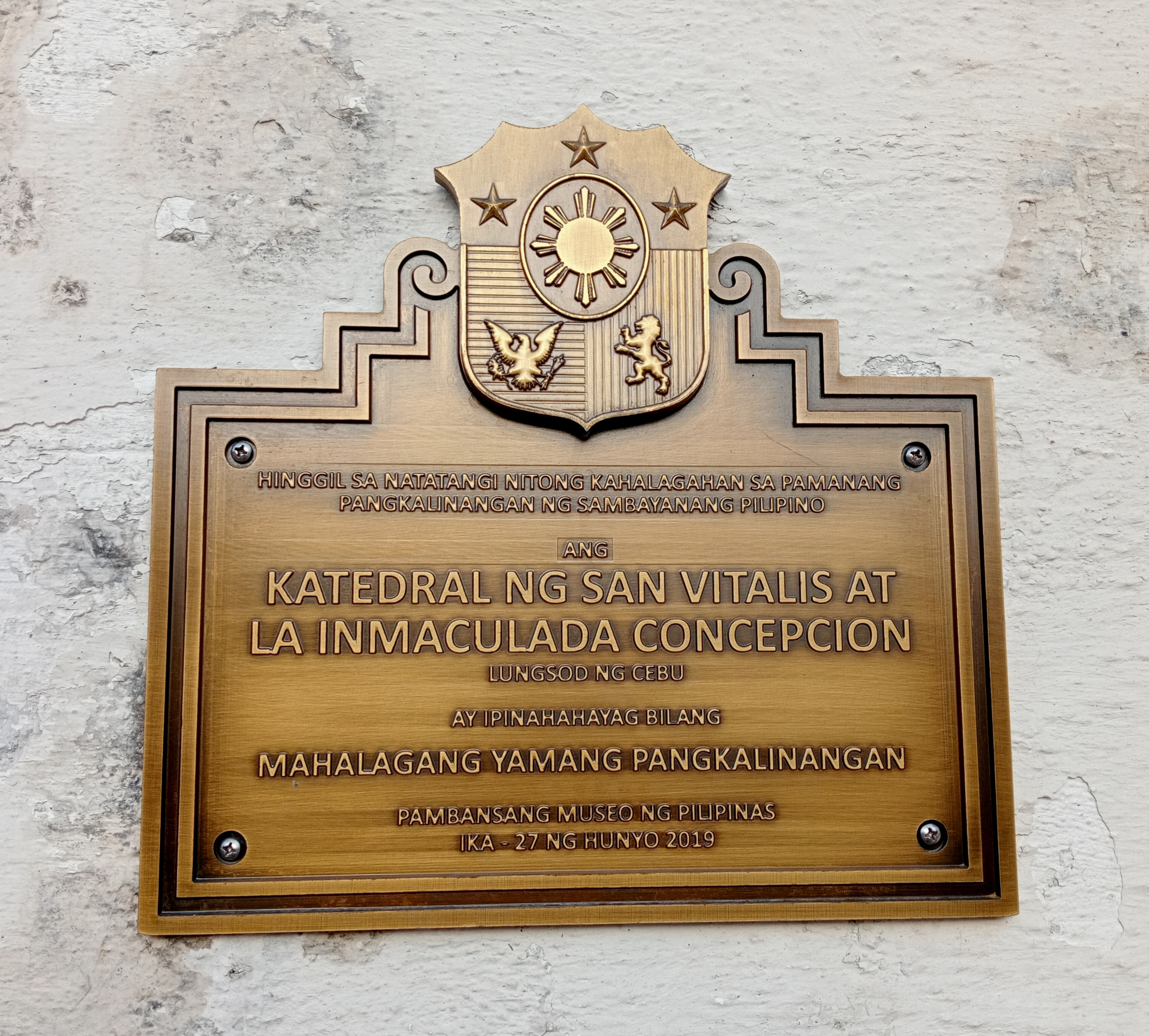
Cathedral Important Cultural Property marker

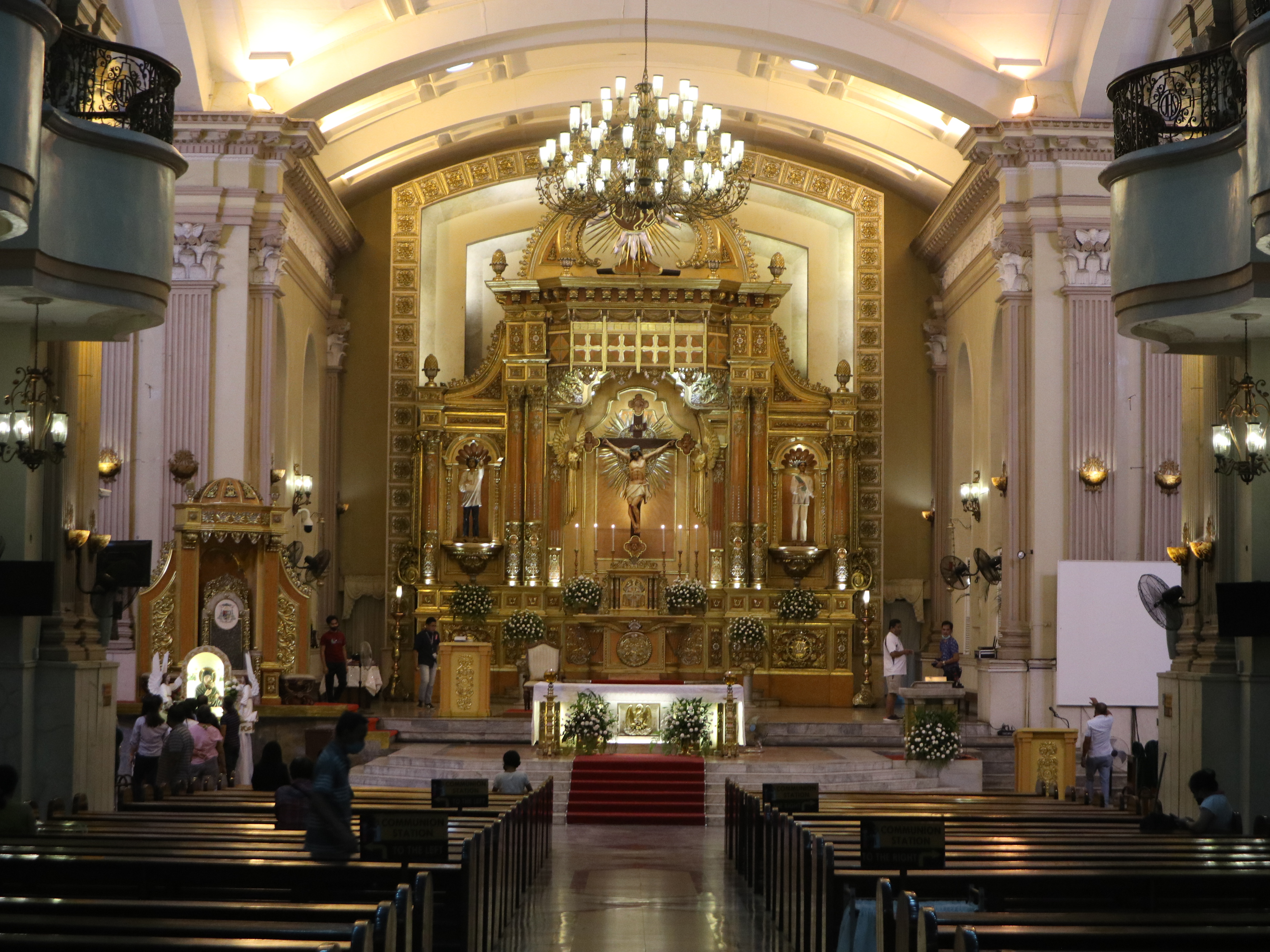
Cathedral sanctuary and main altarpiece

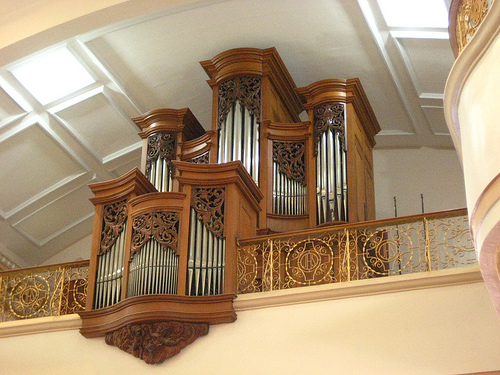
Cathedral pipe organ

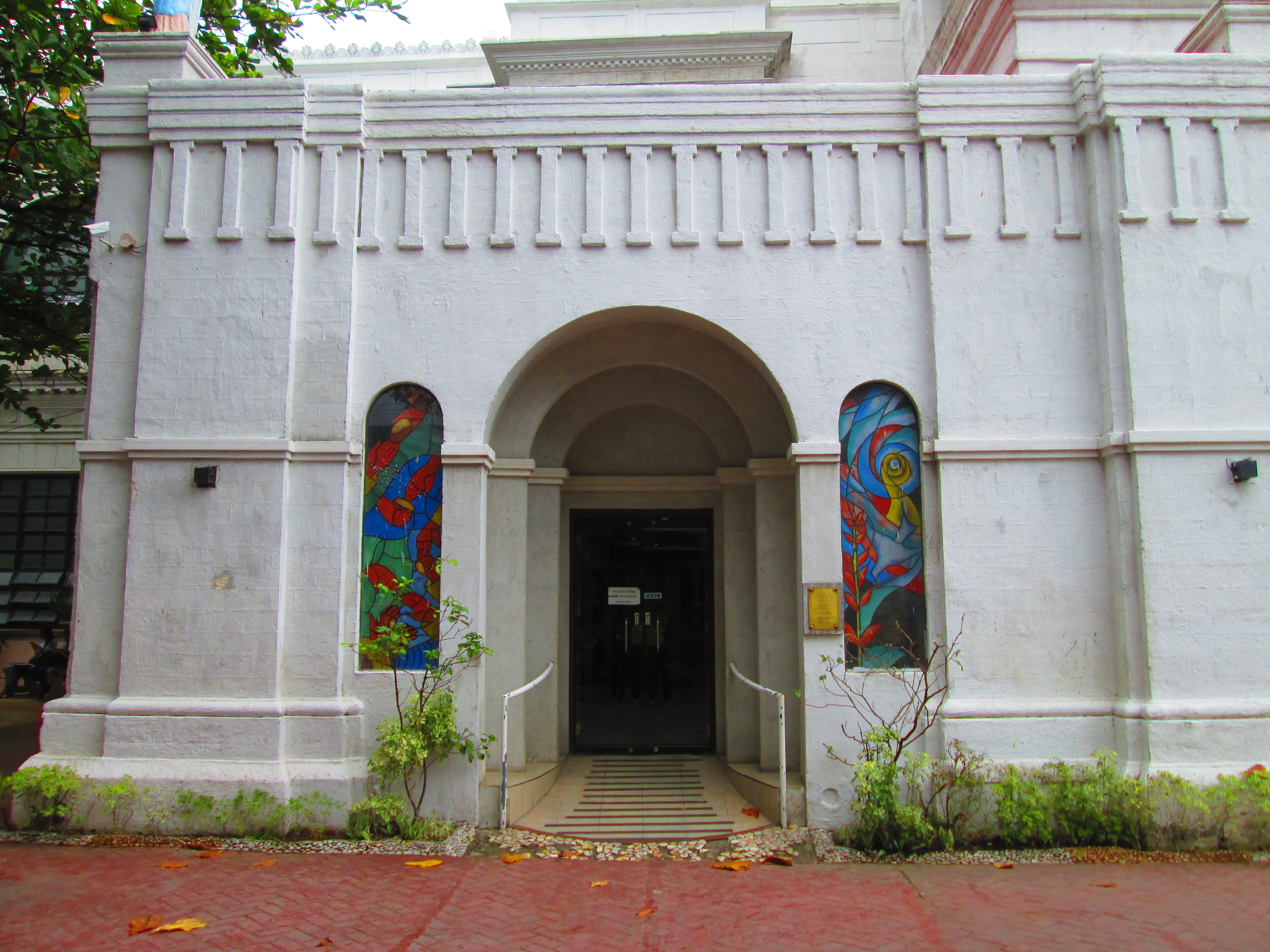
Adoration chapel entrance

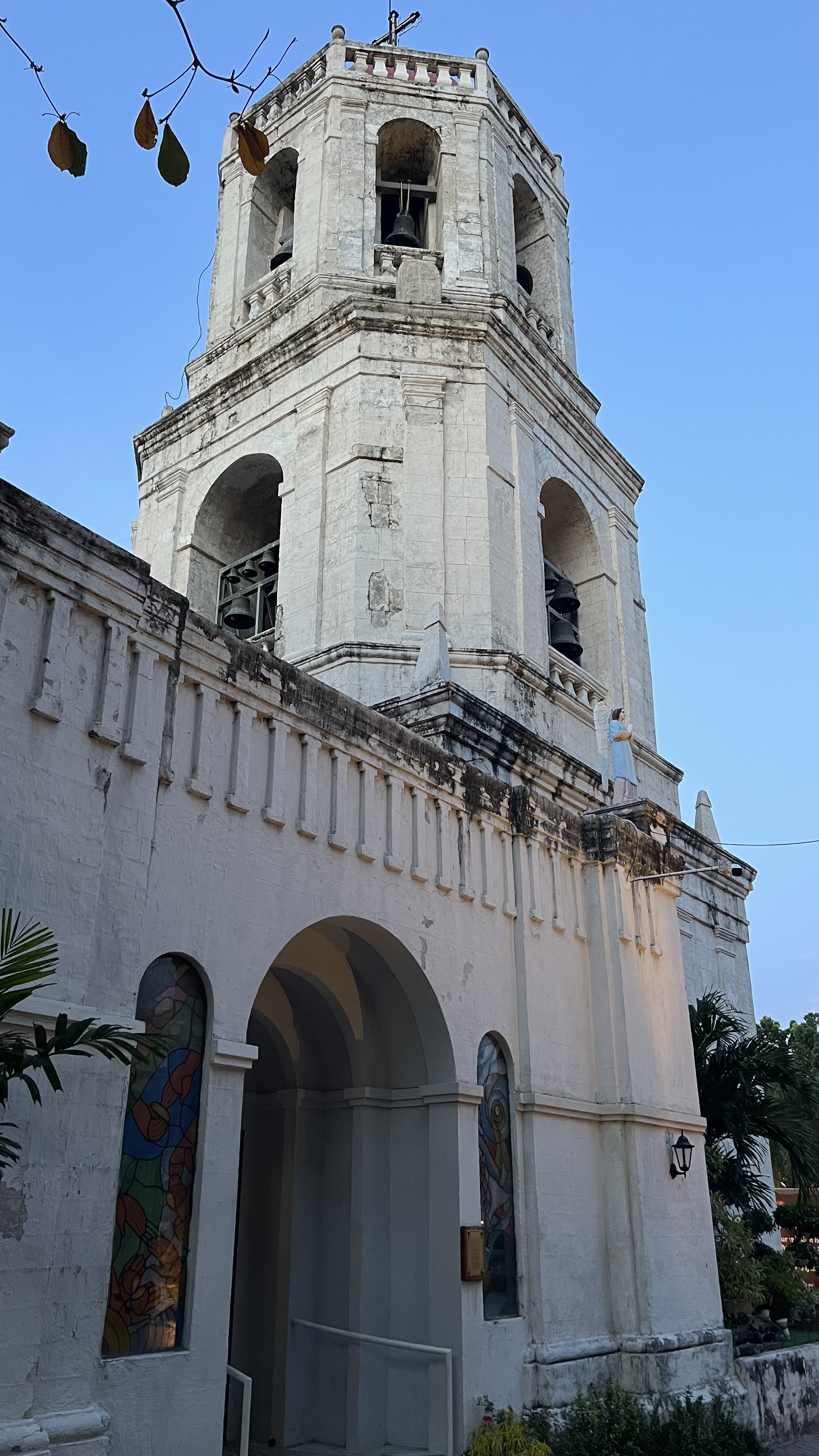
Bell tower

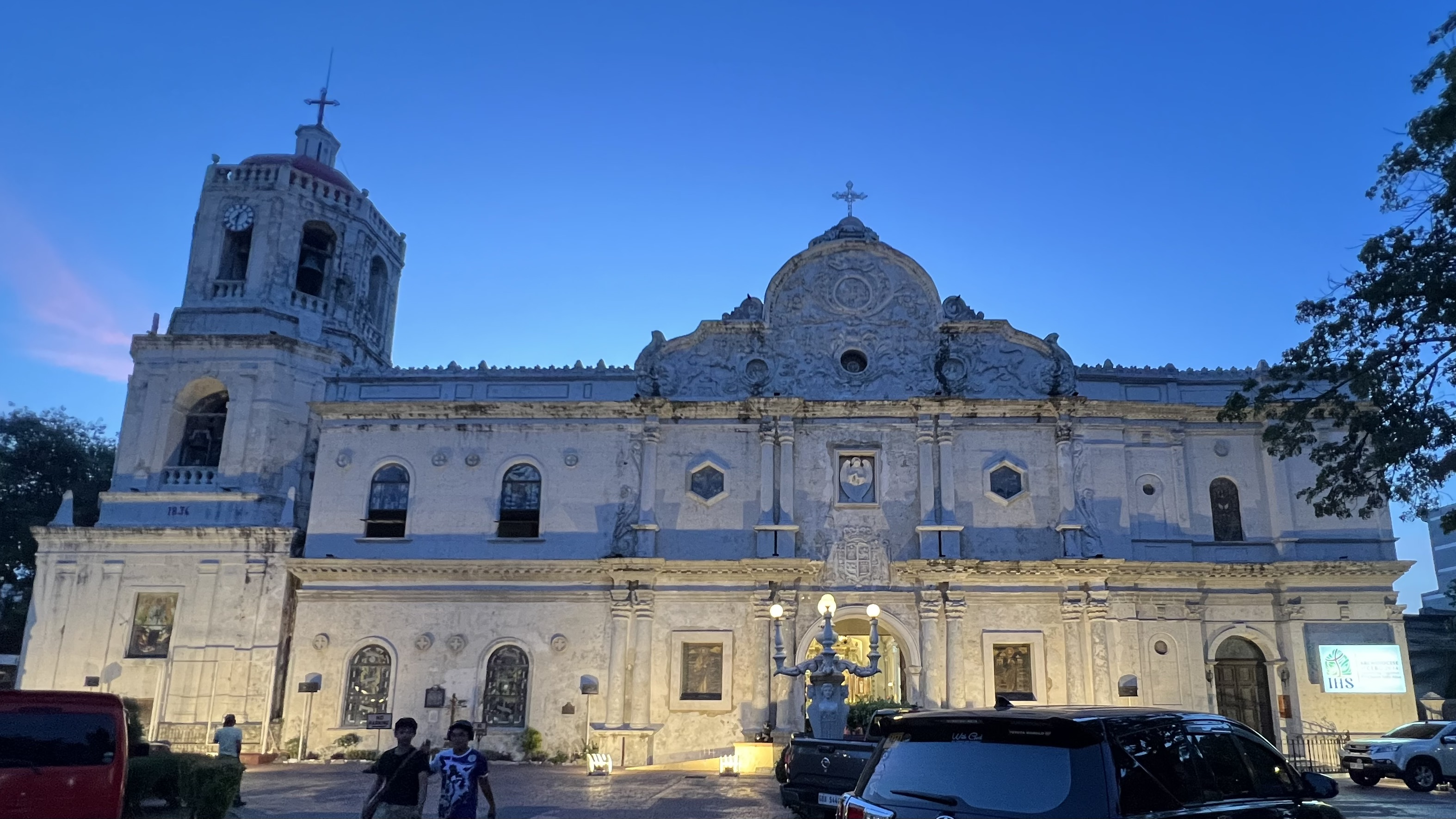
The cathedral during blue hour

== See also ==
- Diocese of Dumaguete
- Diocese of Maasin
- Diocese of Tagbilaran
- Diocese of Talibon
- List of the Roman Catholic dioceses of the Philippines
