= Maximiano Tuazon Cruz =

Filipino bishop (1923–2013)

The Most Reverend Maximiano Tuazon Cruz
- Bishop of Calbayog
- See: Calbayog
- In office: 1994 - 1999
- Predecessor: Sincero Barcenilla Lucero
- Successor: Jose S. Palma
- Previous post: Priest

Orders
- Ordination: November 30, 1947

Personal details
- Born: 4 April 1923 Catbalogan, Philippine Islands
- Died: 9 October 2013 (aged 90) Calbayog, Philippines
- Denomination: Roman Catholic
- Motto: Diligere ecclesiam
- Coat of arms

Styles of Maximiano Tuazon Cruz
- Reference style: The Most Reverend
- Spoken style: Your Excellency

Maximiano Tuazon Cruz (April 4, 1923 – October 9, 2013) was a Filipino prelate of the Catholic Church.

Cruz was born in Catbalogan, Philippines, and was ordained a priest on November 30, 1947. He was appointed titular bishop to Tanudaia as well as auxiliary bishop to the Diocese of Calbayog on November 10, 1987, and ordained bishop on December 1, 1987. He was appointed bishop to the Diocese of Calbayog on December 21, 1994, and retired from diocese on January 13, 1999. He died on October 9, 2013, at age 90.
