= Archdiocese of Palo =

Catholic archdiocese in the Philippines

Coordinates: 11.1594°N 124.9910°E

Archdiocese of Palo Archidioecesis Palensis Arkidiyosesis han Palo Arkidiyosesis sa Palo Arkidiyosesis ng Palo

Catholic
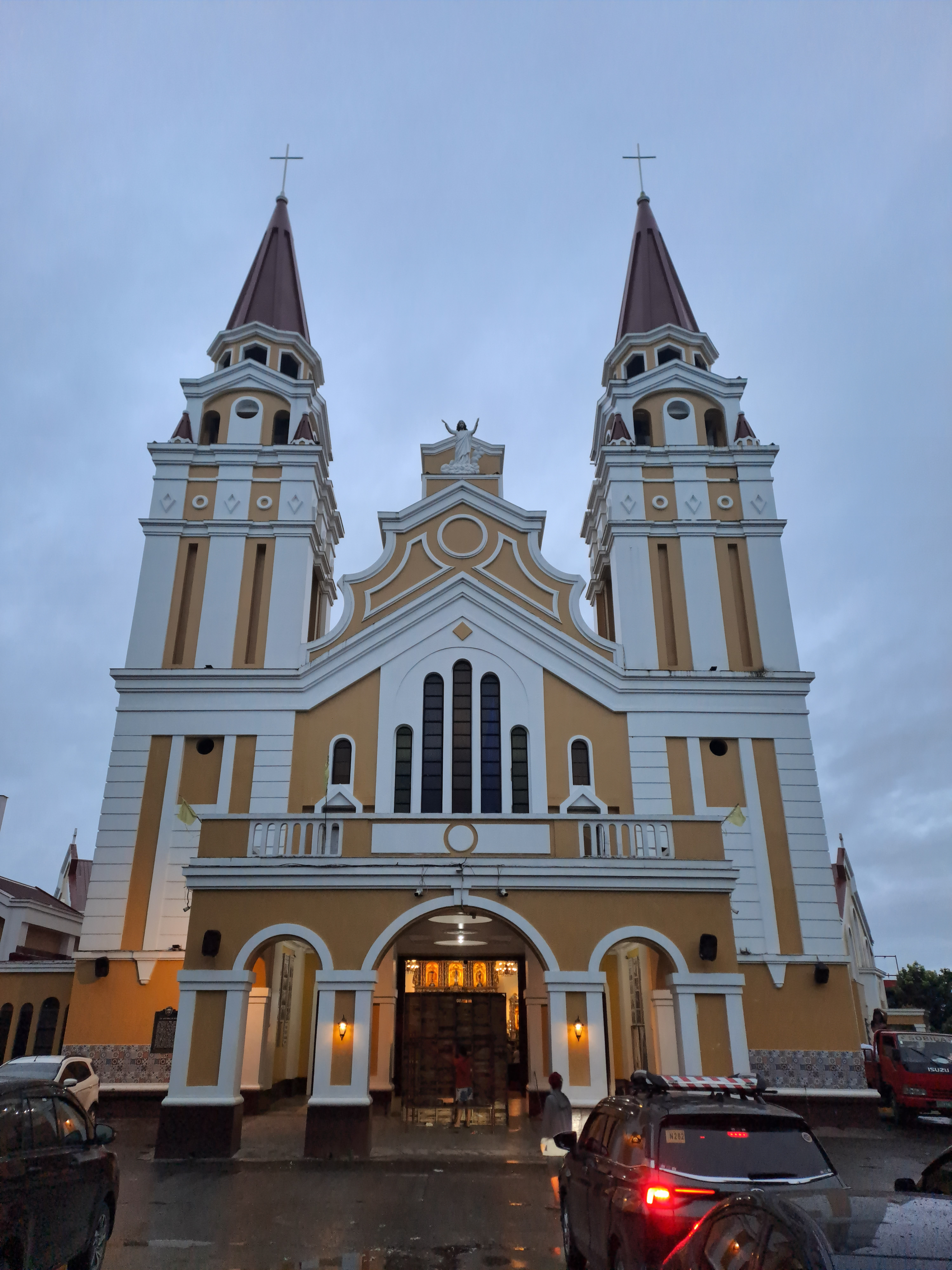
- Metropolitan Cathedral of Our Lord's Transfiguration, Palo, Leyte

- Coat of arms

Location
- Country: Philippines
- Territory: Leyte (except Bato, Baybay, Calubian, Hilongos, Hindang, Inopacan, Leyte, Matalom, San Isidro and Tabango)
- Ecclesiastical province: Palo
- Metropolitan: Palo

Statistics
- Area: 4,620 km^{2} (1,780 sq mi)
- Population: Total; Catholics: (as of 2021); 1,584,000; 1,520,000 (96%)
- Parishes: 84

Information
- Denomination: Catholic
- Sui iuris church: Latin Church
- Rite: Roman Rite
- Established: November 28, 1937 (Diocese); February 14, 1982 (Archdiocese)
- Cathedral: Metropolitan Cathedral of Our Lord's Transfiguration
- Titular patron: Transfiguration of Our Lord
- Secular priests: 149

Current leadership
- Pope: Leo XIV
- Metropolitan Archbishop: John F. Du
- Suffragans: Sede vacante (Borongan); Isabelo Abarquez (Calbayog); Nolly Buco (Catarman); Rex Ramirez (Naval)
- Vicar General: Gilbert G. Urbina
- Episcopal Vicars: Ronel V. Taboso (Western District) and Carlos D. Rodriguez (Eastern District)
- Judicial Vicar: Elmo O. Borgueta
- Bishops emeritus: Pedro R. Dean Archbishop Emeritus (1985–2006)

Map
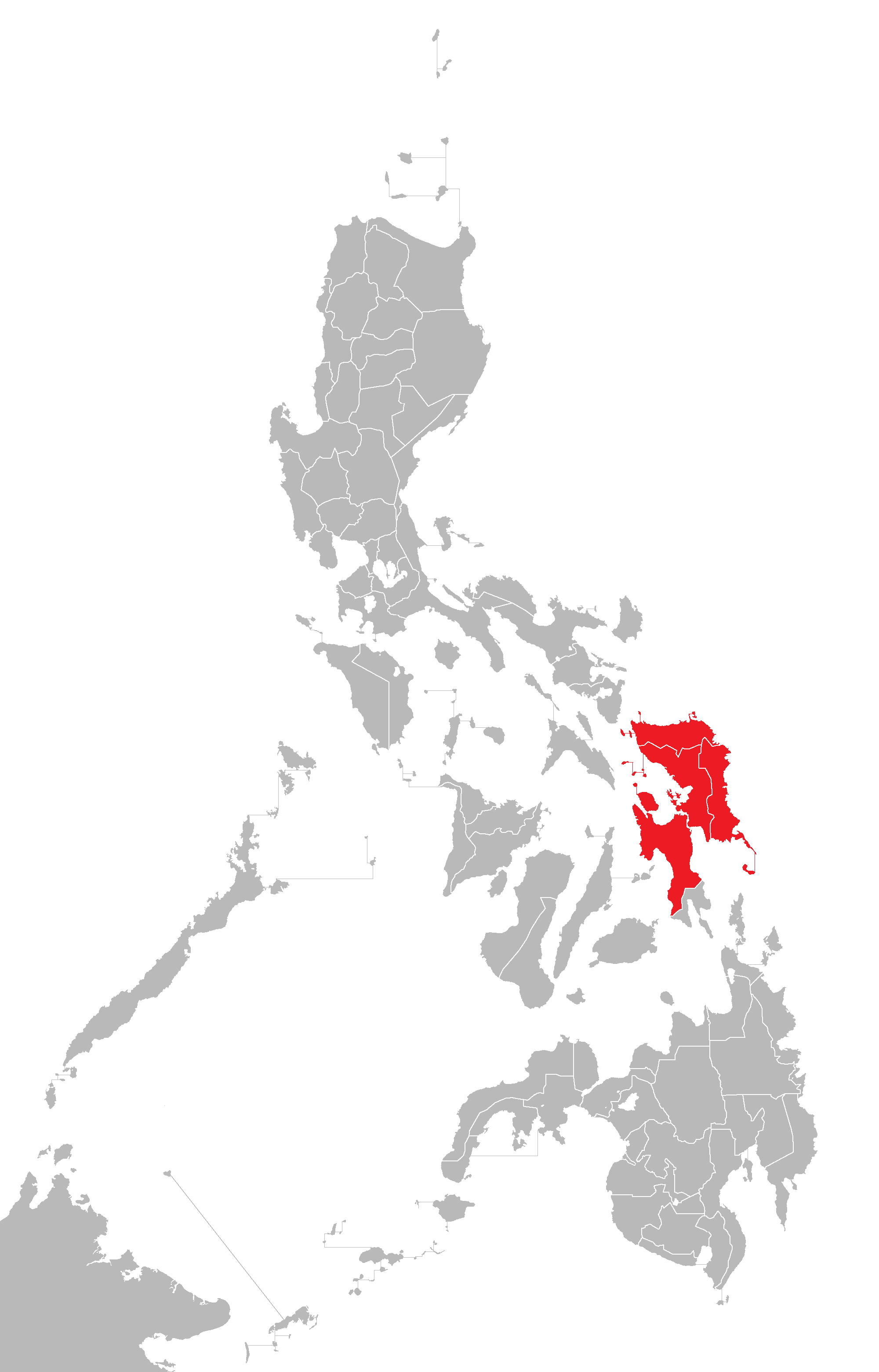
- Jurisdiction of the metropolitan see within the Philippines.

Website
- Website of the Archdiocese

The Archdiocese of Palo is a large administrative Latin Catholic diocese in the town of Palo. It was formed as a diocese on November 28, 1937, and became an archdiocese in 1982, with Calbayog, Borongan, Catarman and Naval Diocese serving as suffragan to it. The archdiocese encompasses 4,620 km^{2} (1,780 sq mi) and an overwhelmingly Catholic population of 1,165,565. The archdiocese has two districts, Eastern and Western, which are divided among the languages Waray and Cebuano. The Eastern District has seven vicariates of 34 parishes. 13 parishes are in the Western District, with one chaplaincy. The archdiocese contains two seminaries. The elder of these is the Sacred Heart Seminary, which was founded in 1944. Founded in 1988, the St. John Evangelist School of Theology serves additional dioceses. Jose S. Palma, a priest from the Archdiocese of Jaro and Bishop of Calbayog was the Archbishop of Palo until he was appointed as Archbishop of Cebu following the retirement of the late Archbishop Ricardo Cardinal Vidal.

The Archdiocese of Palo was created as a diocese on November 28, 1937, and elevated to an archdiocese on November 15, 1982, with four neighboring dioceses of the metropolitan, to include Borongan, Calbayog, Catarman and Naval.

== History ==
The island of Leyte to which the Archdiocese of Palo belongs was the scene of the first Mass in the Philippines celebrated by Pedro de Valderrama on March 31, 1521, Easter Sunday. The exact spot is the small island Limasawa on the southernmost tip of Leyte. However, formal work of evangelization did not start until 74 years later, when the Jesuits arrived in Kangara or Carigara, led by Pedro Chirino with four priests and one brother companion on 16 July 1595. At that time there were settlements connected with each other by dirt roads. The missionaries had to work for the formation of the towns since the people were spread out over the lowlands and into the mountains. The population of about 70,000 came under the general control of local officials called encomenderos assigned to collect the tribute from the people. A constant difficulty the missionaries encountered in their efforts of spreading the Faith was the greediness of the tribute collectors and the carrying out of the Moro raids. These raids usually came during the monsoon season. The object of the raids was to capture slaves, to inflict physical damage to the towns and countryside, and to carry away any crop or booty. The captured slaves were to be later sold in Malaya, Macassar, or Java. The first major raid on record was made on October 28, 1603, composed of seventy ships and two thousand men. Palo and Dulag were burned, and captives were taken. A raid in 1613 resulted in the capture of four hundred people in Dulag alone. Another raid in 1634 brought heavy damage to Cabalian, Sogod, Baybay, and Ormoc. Members of the clergy were at times among the captives, some of whom were killed. The first missions were Carigara (1595), Dulag (1595), Palo (1596), Alangalang (1597), and Ormoc (1597). Early structures were made of light materials, but eventually they were replaced by stone structures, e.g. Tanauan (1714) and Abuyog (1718). Baptisms were preceded by a period of training in the Christian way of life. This period of training would often last for several months. In the Palo missions a small catechetical text was printed in the Visayan by Cristobal Himenes, as an aid in the preparation of candidates for baptism. By 1600 there were an estimated 6,000 people in the Palo Community, 1,000 of whom had been baptized. The same ratio was found in the twenty-five villages where the missionaries had chapels; there were 4,946 Christians in the total population of 24,500. By 1768 most residents of Leyte had been baptized. There were twenty established parishes in that year. Four of the parishes were in the North: Carigara, Barugo, Alangalang, Jaro. Eight of the parishes were in the west and south: Palompon, Ormoc, Baybay, Hilongos, Maasin, Sogod, Cabalian, and Hinunangan. Another eight parishes were in the east: Palo, Tanauan, Dulag, Abuyog, Dagami, Burauen, and, across the gulf in Samar Island), Basey and Balangiga. A hospital and boarding school were built in Dulag, while Carigara conducted a day school.

In 1768 the Jesuits were ordered to leave the Philippines, due to circumstances in Europe. They were replaced in Leyte by the Augustinians, who in 1834 ceded the parishes, the northeastern part to the Franciscans while the diocesan clergy of Cebu took over the parishes in the west and the south. In 1898 the Franciscans, as Spanish citizens, had to leave the country, and the diocesan clergy took over. Leyte had belonged to the Diocese of Cebu until 1910 and then belonged to the Diocese of Calbayog until 1937. On November 28, 1937 it was canonically erected as a diocese in its own right, with the seat in Palo. On March 23, 1968, Palo was divided into two dioceses, the other diocese based in Maasin with Vicente T. Ataviado as its first ordinary. The diocese of Maasin comprises the whole province of Southern Leyte including six municipalities southwest of Leyte. In 1988 the diocese was again divided with the creation of the Diocese of Naval, comprising the island north of Leyte called Biliran and four towns northeast of the province of Leyte facing the island of Biliran. The Diocese of Palo was elevated to an archdiocese on November 15, 1982. It was canonically erected as an archdiocese on February 14, 1983. It comprises the whole province of Leyte except 10 municipalities. It has four suffragan dioceses: Calbayog, Borongan, Catarman, and Naval. Its titular patron is the Transfiguration of Our Lord.

The archdiocese has 1.2 million Catholic residents, 72 parishes, 1 quasi-parish, 2 chaplaincy and 13 mission stations/areas, divided into two districts: the Eastern District (the Waray-speaking, comprising the vicariates of Tacloban, Carigara, Burauen, Chancery seminary, Abuyog and Palo), and the Western District (Cebuano-speaking people which consist of the vicariates of Ormoc and Palompon)

== Ordinaries ==
Bishops of Palo
Picture	Name	From	Until	Coat of arms
	Manuel M. Mascariñas	December 16, 1937	November 12, 1951, appointed, Bishop of Tagbilaran	
	Lino R. Gonzaga	November 12, 1951	August 12, 1966, appointed, Archbishop of Zamboanga	
	Teotimo C. Pacis	November 18, 1966	May 23, 1969, appointed, Bishop of Legazpi	
	Manuel S. Salvador	October 21, 1969	September 25, 1972, appointed, Coadjutor Archbishop of Cebu	
	Cipriano V. Urgel	April 12, 1973	November 15, 1982, elevated, Archbishop of Palo	

Archbishops of Palo
Picture	Name	From	Until
	Cipriano V. Urgel	November 15, 1982	April 22, 1985, died
	Pedro R. Dean	October 12, 1985	March 18, 2006, retired
	Jose S. Palma	March 18, 2006	January 13, 2011, transferred, Archbishop of Cebu
	John F. Du	February 25, 2012	present

== Seminaries ==
- Sacred Heart Seminary, Palo, Leyte
- St. John The Evangelist School of Theology, Palo, Leyte

== Suffragan dioceses and bishops ==
Diocese	Bishop	Period in office	Coat of arms
Borongan (Eastern Samar)	Sede vacante	Since September 10, 2026 (47 days)	
Calbayog (Samar)	Isabelo Caiban Abarquez	March 8, 2007 – present (19 years, 233 days)	
Catarman (Northern Samar)	Nolly Camingue Buco	January 15, 2025 – present (1 year, 285 days)	
Naval (Biliran and Northern Leyte)	Rex Cullingham Ramirez	January 12, 2018 – present (8 years, 288 days)	

== See also ==
- Catholic Church in the Philippines

== Sources ==
- Archdiocese of Palo, Catholic Bishops' Conference of the Philippines
