= List of highways in Eastern Visayas =

The highways in Eastern Visayas are parts of the national Philippine highway network, created and owned by the Department of Public Works and Highways (DPWH). The highways are classified into three: primary highways, secondary highways, and tertiary highways. Primary highways are numbered from N1 to N99, while secondary highways are numbered from N100 to N999. There are 29 numbered highways: two primary and 27 secondary, in Eastern Visayas.

== Description ==
According to the atlas of the Department of Public Works and Highways, 29 numbered highways: two primary and the 27 secondary, are in Eastern Visayas. Of these, (Note: For highways interconnected between provinces, each province that has a segment of the highway includes it.) three are in Biliran, four are in Eastern Samar, 13 are in Leyte, (Note: Including roads in Ormoc, excluding Tacloban) four are in Northern Samar, eight are in Samar, seven are in Southern Leyte, and four are in Tacloban. These roads are part of the Philippine highway network, a network of roads and highways owned by the DPWH. It has three classifications: primary, a large road composed of sections without any breaks or forks that connect cities of at least 200,000 population; secondary, a road connecting cities, ports, airports, tourism enterprises, provincial capitals, and major national government infrastructure to national primary roads, and bypass or diversion roads; and tertiary, roads deemed significant by the DPWH. Other types include provincial roads, municipal and city roads, and barangay roads. Primary roads are numbered from N1 to N99, while secondary roads are numbered from N100 to N999. Meanwhile, tertiary roads are not numbered.

== History ==
Preceding the Philippine highway network, numerous roads were found in Eastern Visayas. Some road portions were not maintained properly, while others were. In 1951, an Executive Order was created to classify and limit public roads and to provide proper maintenance after recommendation from the National Transportation Board. Further changes were made in 1955. In the 1970s, the Pan-Philippine Highway, a route stretching from Cagayan to Davao City was planned to be built, with sections in Leyte and Samar. Highways in Eastern Visayas that were connected to other road systems were planned due to the archipelagic configuration of the region. In 1987, an act let the DPWH classify roads based on criteria. On November 25, 1997, the Rawis-Catubig Road section, the Pangpang-Palapag-Mapanas-Gamay Lapinig Road section, and the Laoang-Calomotan Road section, all under the N670 marker, were declared national roads. On November 14, 2013, the Catarman Airport Road, under the road marker 671, was declared a national road. On April 6, 2016, the Gandara Diversion Road, under road marker 677, was upgraded from an unclassified road into a national one. On July 6, 2017, the Guiuan Sulangan Peninsula Road was upgraded into a national road with the road marker 678. In 2018, the current road system was made.

== List of highways ==
The following is a list of highways in the region of Eastern Visayas which are currently functional according to the DPWH.

Highways in Eastern Visayas
Name	Length (km)	Length (mi)	Southern or western terminus	Northern or eastern terminus	Province(s)	Classification	Ref.							
Name	Length (km)	Length (mi)	Southern or western terminus	Northern or eastern terminus	Province(s)	Classification	Ref.	N1	395.164	245.6	Liloan, Southern Leyte	Allen, Northern Samar	Northern Samar, Samar, Leyte, Southern Leyte	Primary
N70	165.022	102.6	Mahaplag, Leyte	Palo, Leyte	Leyte	Primary								
N670	462.913	287.6	Santa Rita, Samar	Allen, Northern Samar	Northern Samar, Eastern Samar, Samar	Secondary								
N671	1.067	0.663	Catarman, Northern Samar		Northern Samar	Secondary								
N672	66.072	41	Calbayog, Samar	Catarman, Northern Samar	Northern Samar, Samar	Secondary								
N673	1.990	1.24	Calbayog, Samar		Samar	Secondary								
N674	62.481	38.8	Paranas, Samar	Taft, Eastern Samar	Eastern Samar, Samar	Secondary								
N675	1.335	0.83	Catbalogan, Samar		Samar	Secondary								
N676	33.504	20.82	Quinapondan, Eastern Samar	Guiuan, Eastern Samar	Eastern Samar	Secondary								
N677	1.423	0.88	Gandara, Samar		Samar	Secondary								
N678	19.224	11.94	Guiuan, Eastern Samar		Eastern Samar	Secondary								
N679	4.020	2.498	Calbayog, Samar		Samar	Secondary								
N680	108.925	67.7	Biliran, Biliran		Biliran	Secondary								
N681	31.515	19.6	Capoocan, Leyte	Biliran, Biliran	Leyte, Biliran	Secondary								
N682	20.074	12.47	Naval, Biliran	Caibiran, Biliran	Biliran	Secondary								
N683	5.970	3.709	Ormoc, Leyte		Leyte	Secondary								
N684	148.356	92.2	Ormoc, Leyte	Leyte, Leyte	Leyte	Secondary								
N686	13.252	8.23	Tacloban, Leyte		Leyte	Secondary								
N687	5.510	3.43	Tacloban, Leyte		Leyte	Secondary								
N690	112.160	69.7	Liloan, Southern Leyte	Abuyog, Leyte	Southern Leyte, Leyte	Secondary								
N691	40.628	25.24	San Ricardo, Southern Leyte	Liloan, Southern Leyte	Southern Leyte	Secondary								
N692	153.879	95.6	Sogod, Southern Leyte	Baybay, Leyte	Leyte, Southern Leyte	Secondary								
N693	23.935	14.87	Bato, Leyte	Bontoc, Southern Leyte	Leyte, Southern Leyte	Secondary								
N694	34.829	21.639	Maasin, Southern Leyte	Bontoc, Southern Leyte	Southern Leyte	Secondary								
N695	1.286	0.799	Maasin, Southern Leyte		Southern Leyte	Secondary								
N717	6.828	4.24	Tacloban, Leyte		Leyte	Secondary								
N718	2.981	1.852	Palo, Leyte		Leyte	Secondary								
N719	1.534	0.953	Palo, Leyte		Leyte	Secondary								

== Gallery ==
Pictures of highways in Eastern Visayas
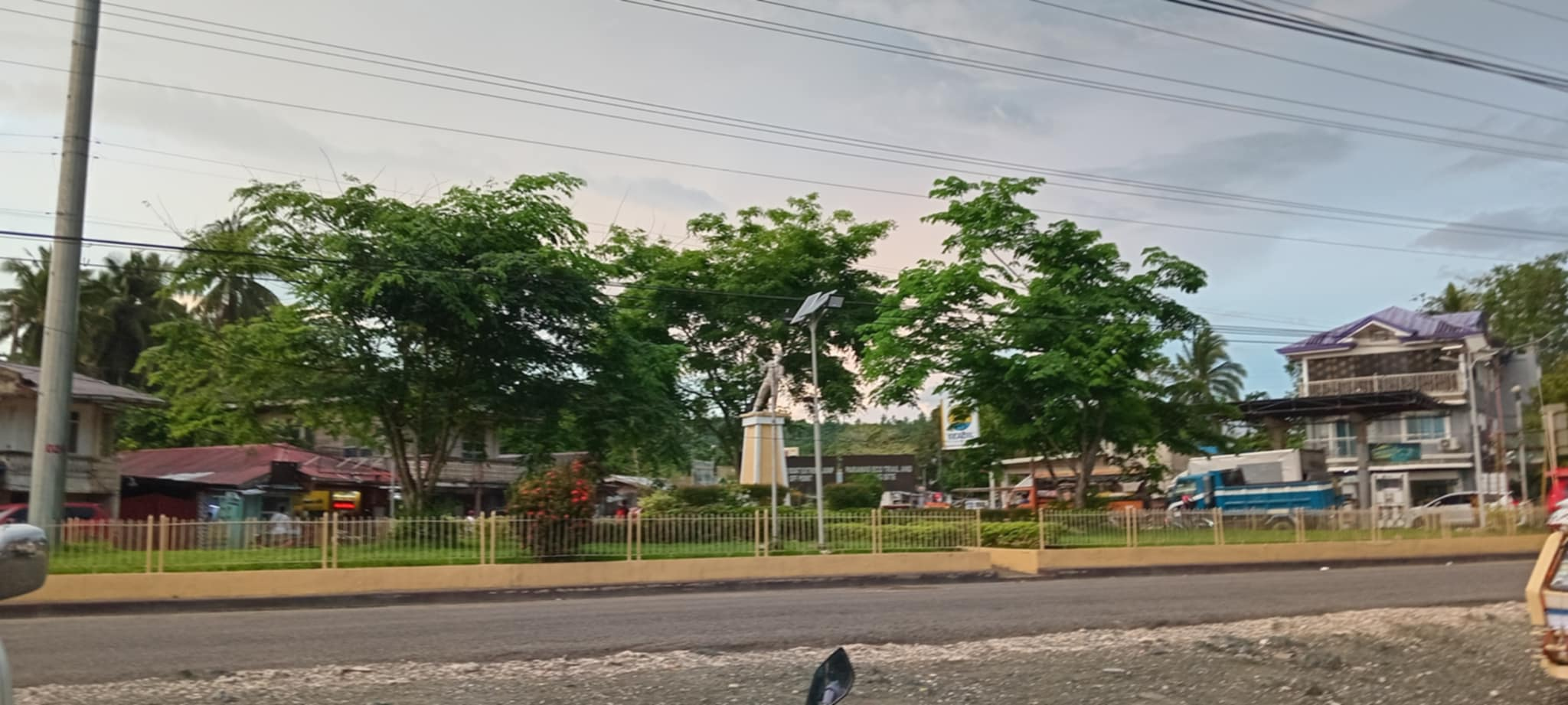
The crossing between N674 and N1 in Paranas

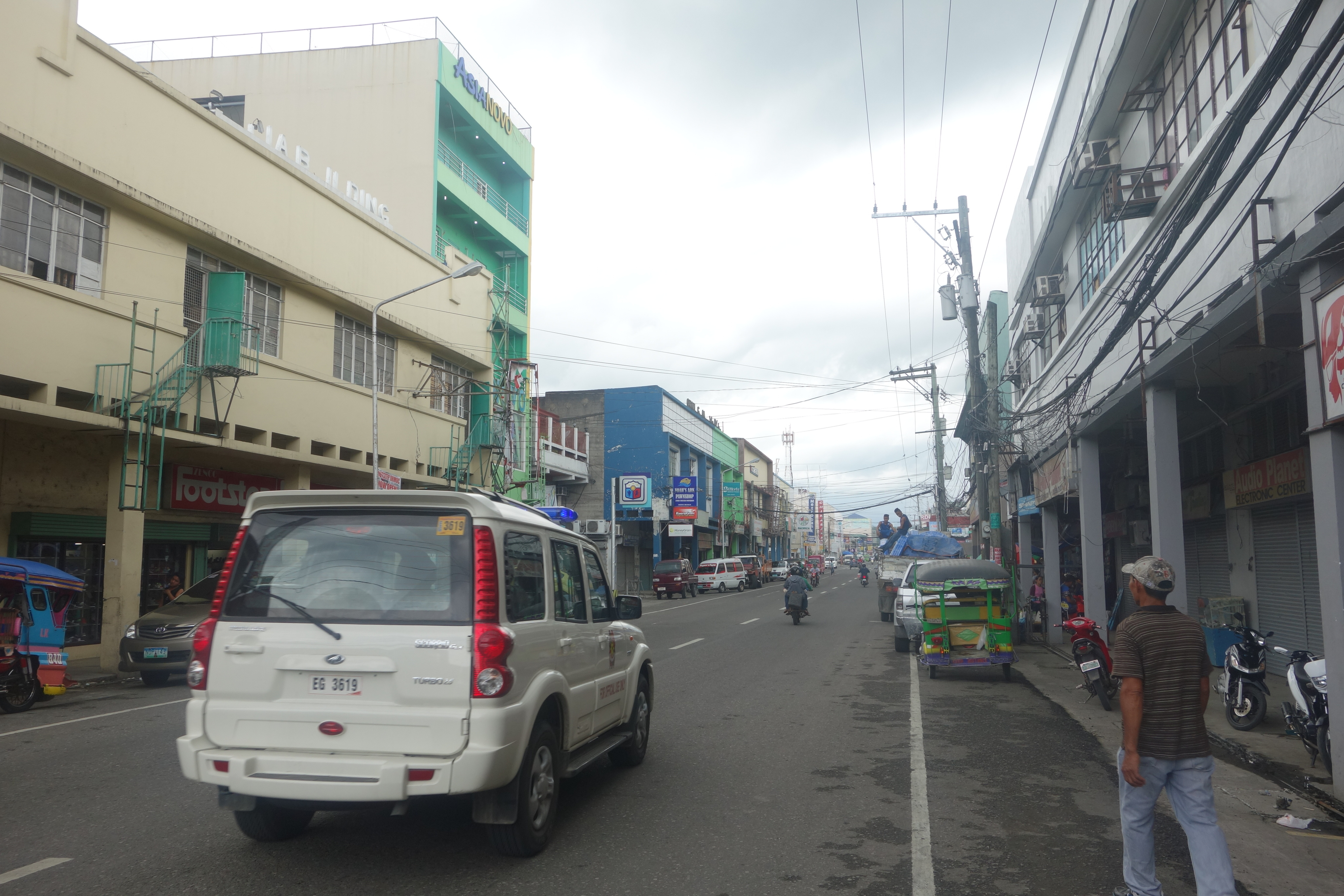
An image of N70 in Ormoc

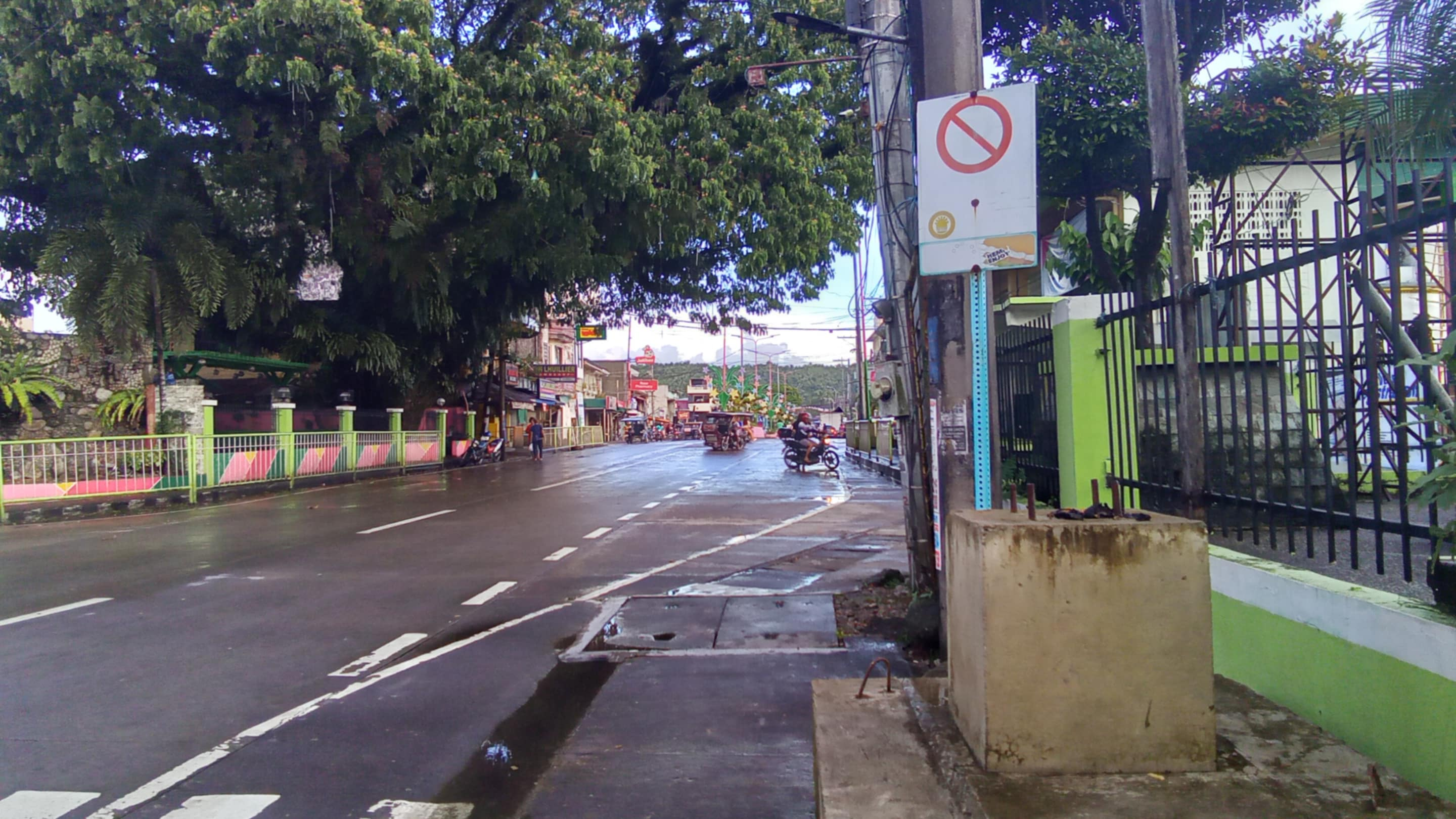
N670 in Borongan Poblacion

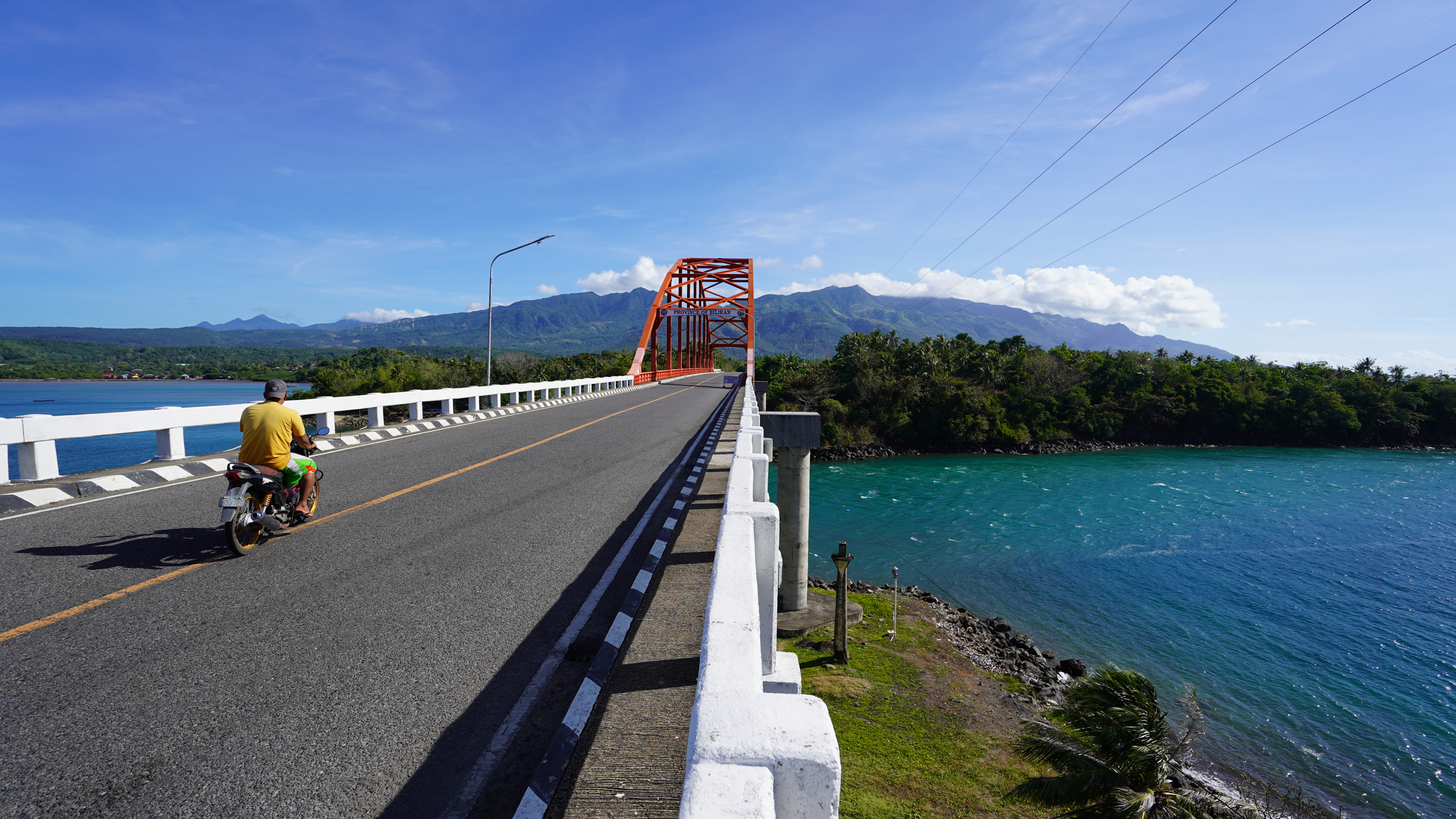
N681 in the Biliran Bridge portion

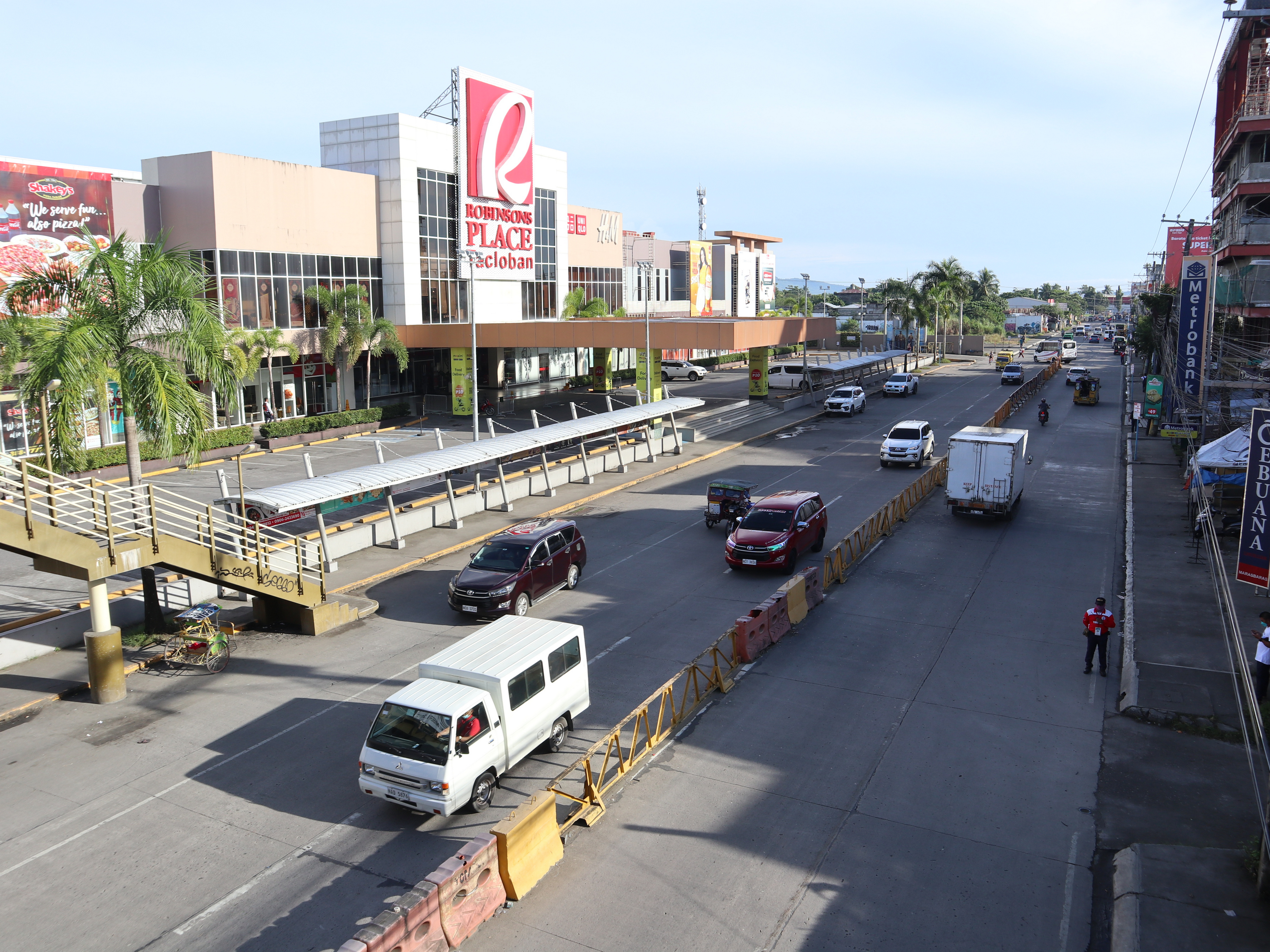
N686 in Marasbaras, Tacloban
