= Gandara Diversion Road =

Road in Samar, Philippines

Gandara Diversion Road

Route information
- Maintained by Department of Public Works and Highways
- Length: 1.4 km (0.87 mi)
- Component highways: N677

Major junctions
- North end: AH 26 (N1) (Maharlika Highway) near the west of Gandara Town Proper
- South end: AH 26 (N1) (Maharlika Highway) near the east of Gandara Town Proper

Location
- Country: Philippines
- Provinces: Samar
- Towns: Gandara

Highway system
- Roads in the Philippines; Highways; Expressways; List
← N676	→ N680

Gandara Diversion Road is a 1.4-kilometer (0.87 mi) national secondary road in the town of Gandara, Samar in the Philippines.

The entire road is designated as National Route 677 (N677) of the Philippine highway network. Prior to the newly assigned number routes assigned by the Department of Public Works and Highways for 2017, it was originally unnumbered and previously classified as a tertiary national road.

== Route description ==
As much like other diversion roads in the country, the road bypasses the town proper of Gandara. Travelers from Calbayog and most of the travelers from Luzon cut the travel time from Maharlika Highway, which goes into the town proper. Most of the road is likely a scenic route where it passes through the green hilly landscape and palm trees.

== Intersections ==
The entire route is located in Gandara, Samar. Intersections are numbered by kilometer post, with the Rizal Park in Manila designated as kilometer 0.

km	mi	Destinations	Notes
763.315	474.302	AH 26 (N1) (Maharlika Highway) – Calbayog, Allen, Manila (via ferry)	Northern terminus.
764.369	474.957	AH 26 (N1) (Maharlika Highway) – Catbalogan, Tacloban	Southern terminus.
1.000 mi = 1.609 km; 1.000 km = 0.621 mi
