= Tanauan, Leyte =

Municipality in Leyte, Philippines

Tanauan
- Municipality
- Municipality of Tanauan
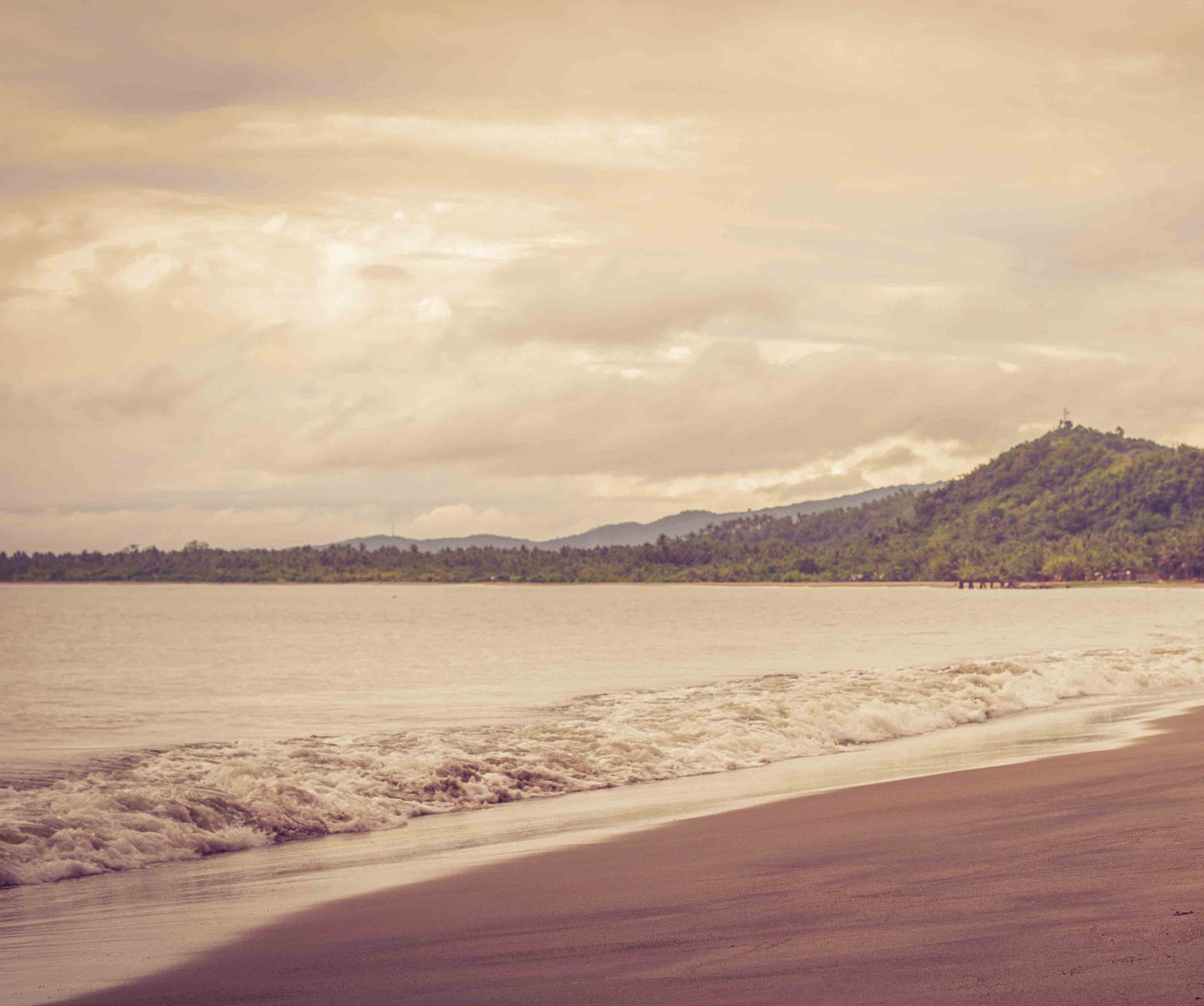
- View of a part of Tanauan's beach, looking towards the south.

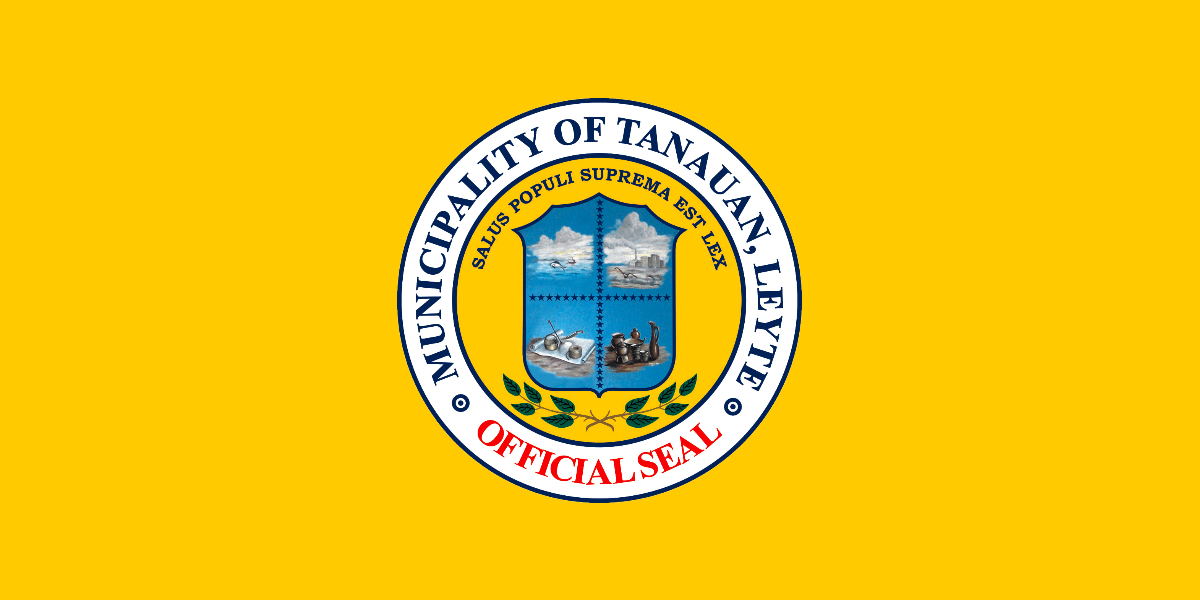
- Flag Seal

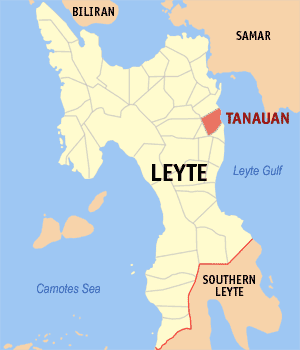
- Map of Leyte with Tanauan highlighted
- Interactive map of Tanauan
- Location within the Philippines
- Coordinates: 11°07′N 125°01′E
- Country: Philippines
- Region: Eastern Visayas
- Province: Leyte
- District: 1st district
- Founded: 1710
- Barangays: 54 (see Barangays)

Government
  - Type: Sangguniang Bayan
  - Mayor: Ma. Gina Egonio Merilo
  - Vice Mayor: Archie Lawrence Redoña Kapunan
  - Representative: Ferdinand Martin G. Romualdez
  - Councilors: List: • Quintin T. Octa; • Archie Lawrence R. Kapunan; • Mark Giffren E. Merilo; • Bianito M. Fiel; • Jovencio K. Badana; • Lauro A. Villero; • Jose C. Angulo; • Paul Emmanuel R. Cinco; DILG Masterlist of Officials
  - Electorate: 38,759 voters (2025)

Area
  - Total: 78.41 km^{2} (30.27 sq mi)
- Elevation: 9.0 m (29.5 ft)
- Highest elevation: 305 m (1,001 ft)
- Lowest elevation: 0 m (0 ft)

Population (2024 census)
  - Total: 60,212
  - Density: 767.9/km^{2} (1,989/sq mi)
  - Households: 14,892

Economy
  - Income class: 1st municipal income class
  - Poverty incidence: 25.07% (2023)
  - Revenue: ₱ 240.1 million (2024)
  - Assets: ₱ 865.9 million (2024)
  - Expenditure: ₱ 287.4 million (2024)
  - Liabilities: ₱ 109.7 million (2024)

Service provider
  - Electricity: Don Orestes Romualdez Electric Coperative (DORELCO)
- Time zone: UTC+8 (PST)
- ZIP code: 6502
- PSGC: 0803748000
- IDD : area code: +63 (0)53
- Native languages: Waray; Tagalog
- Website: www.tanauan-leyte.gov.ph

Tanauan (IPA: [tɐn'ʔaʊɐn]), officially the Municipality of Tanauan (Waray: Bungto han Tanauan; Tagalog: Bayan ng Tanauan), is a first-class municipality in the province of Leyte, Philippines. According to the 2024 census, it has a population of 60,212 people.

Tanauan is one of the oldest towns in Leyte, dating back to the year 1710. It is composed of 54 barangays. The town has also been known as the “Cradle of Intellectuals”, or the Bungto han Kamag-araman, since the Spanish colonial era. Tanauan is approximately 18 kilometers south of Tacloban City, the capital of the Eastern Visayas Region. It is bounded on the north by the municipality of Palo, Tolosa on the south, Dagami and Tabon-tabon on its west side and on the east by San Pedro Bay.

The town was heavily damaged by Super Typhoon Haiyan (Yolanda) in November 2013. The town celebrates its fiesta annually on August 15.

== History ==
=== Pre-Spanish and Spanish Colonial eras ===
The town got its name from a towering molave tree which served as a look-out tower. “Tan-awan” or "taran-awan" means to "look out" in the Waray language. In Visayan and Mindanao history, a person who served as a lookout is there to watch for Moro pirates who would attack and plunder settlements along the coast.

The first known settlers of Tanauan were the family of Calanao with his wife and only daughter. In 1661, Juanillo Siengco's family joined the Calanao family in the settlement along the riverbanks of the Bukid River at the foot of Adil Hill. By the time their settlements were more developed, the plundering of the Moros along the coast intensified. Seeking for refuge, they built a stone-walled enclosure called cuta in the area of Buaya. Later, Juanillo's son, Josef, married Calanao's daughter, Sangod, and from the families of Juanillo Siengco and Calanao a tribe was formed, which gave Tanauan its first tribal leaders.

In 1710, during the Spanish reign in the Philippines, the first town officials were appointed by the Spanish authorities. From 1710 up to the end of the Spanish Colonial era in the 1900s and the start of the American occupation, 47 persons became chief executives of the municipality. The 1818 Spanish census recorded 2,153 native families in Tanauan and 29 Spanish-Filipino families living with them side-by-side.

Tolosa, an adjacent town to the south of Tanauan, was once part of the municipality. Through the efforts of Magdalino Vivero and Domingo Camacho, the Spanish government was petitioned to grant Tolosa autonomy from the municipality. The petition was granted in 1852.

=== American Colonial Period to the Japanese Occupation; World War II ===
During the American regime in 1901 to 1943, a new set of municipal executives were assigned. When World War II broke out, Pedro A. Villegas was the incumbent mayor.

When the Japanese occupied the town, Mayor Villegas and his secretary, Janario Perez, refused to serve the Japanese authorities, and thus Rufo Cobacha was appointed mayor by the Japanese, followed by Pedro Bulik who was eventually killed by the local guerrillas.

During the Japanese occupation, the town was burned by the guerrillas in 1943. This unfortunate event destroyed the municipal building, including its records, and a lot of the big ancestral houses of Spanish architecture along Calle Real. When the US Allied Forces stormed the town during the liberation of Leyte, it resulted in further destruction of the municipal hall (Lian Chong Building) and the few remaining houses along Calle Real. However, few lives were lost during the assault as the town's people were warned beforehand and took refuge at the fortified parish church. Eugenio Avila Sr. was the incumbent mayor when the Filipino and American Liberation Forces occupied the town. The US Sixth Army initially established its headquarters in Tanauan before the construction of the airfield began in November 1944.

==== Tanauan Airfield and its logistical importance during the liberation of the Philippines ====
The X and XXIV Corps from the United States Sixth Army took part in the liberation of Tanauan from the Japanese Occupation Forces immediately after the US and Allied Forces landed on the beaches of Leyte in October 1944. Shortly thereafter, the United States Sixth Army, under the command of Lieutenant General Walter Krueger, established its headquarters in Tanauan. On November 15, 1944, a meeting was held at the site of the Sixth Army headquarters by the commanders and staff members of the major units who participated in the Luzon Campaign.

When the US and Allied Forces captured the airstrip at Tacloban, the work to further develop it for US warplanes was handicapped due to the heavy concentration of troops, supplies, and equipment in the area during the early stages of the operation. It was further hampered by insufficient supply of corals for surfacing the runway. Works were also simultaneously done on the other two airstrips in Buri and San Pablo in the vicinity of Burauen, but these were halted in the latter part of November 1944, as it was deemed that a considerable amount of time and effort had been spent in the futile attempt to make these airfields usable. The inability of the Sixth Army to meet its construction dates on the airstrips prevented the US forces from stopping the flow of Japanese reinforcements and made it impossible for the Allied Forces to give sufficient land-based air support to the ground troops.

In a desperate move to have an operational airfield, Lieutenant General Krueger received permission from General Douglas MacArthur to construct an airfield in Tanauan. On November 28, 1944, the headquarters of the US Sixth Army was moved to Tolosa to start the construction of the airfield. The airfield site covers an area bounded on the north, south and west by Embarcadero River, and on the east by San Pedro Bay. The site was favorably chosen due to its generally flat terrain, good sandy surface, and satisfactory drainage, and was also proven to be an excellent location for an airfield. In December 1944, the field became operational. By December 25, 1944, one runway with mat surfacing, one overrun, 90,000 square feet of warm-up area, 120,000 square feet of alert apron, one parallel taxiway, and 26 large dispersal areas were completed. The control tower was code-named “Velvet Tower.”

All Marine Aircraft Group 12 (MAG-12) planes in Leyte, which played an important air support role for the Sixth Army, moved from Tacloban Airfield to Tanauan Airfield in December 1944. The airfield was used by the following units:

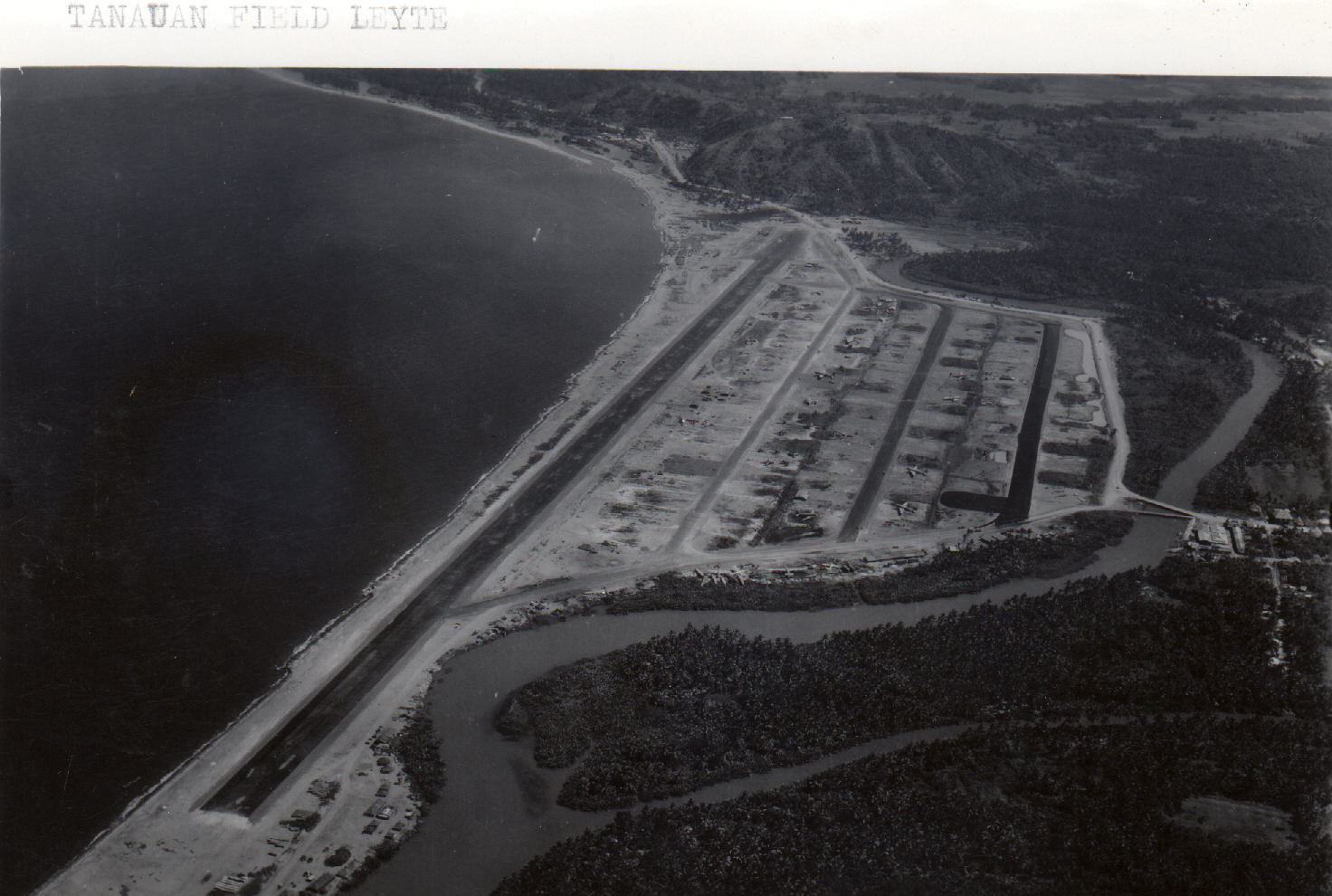
Tanauan Airfield in July 1945 overlooking what is now known as Barangay San Roque (foreground) and Barangay Sto Niño (halfway to the south of the airfield). Ambao Hill is seen in the background.

- 312th Bombardment Group (November 19, 1944 to February 10, 1945)
- 340th Fighter Squadron (December 15, 1944)
- 341st Fighter Squadron (December 14, 1944)
- 460th Fighter-Interceptor Training Squadron (December 12, 1944)
- 433rd Troop Carrier Group (January 19, 1945 to May 31, 1945)
- 348th FG 460th Fighter Squadron (P-47)
- 348th FG 340th Fighter Squadron (P-47)
- 348th FG 341st Fighter Squadron (P-47)
- 348th FG 342nd Fighter Squadron (P-47)
- 25th Liaison Squadron (UC-78 and L-5).

The airfield was abandoned following the withdrawal of the Allied Forces after the war and was later on referred to as "landing" by the locals. Today, a small remnant of this airfield can still be found in an area called "Pawa", located in Barangay Santo Niño. Most of the remaining areas are now occupied by large business establishments such as the Pepsi Cola Tanauan Plant and New Leyte Edible Oil Manufacturing Corporation compound. The Tanauan Public Market, various commercial buildings and residential neighborhoods are also now in the area. The airfield covers the area of what is now known as Barangay San Roque and Barangay Santo Niño. Maharlika Highway (formerly known as Highway 1), which connects the Eastern Visayas Region with Luzon to the north and Mindanao to the south, traverses the former airfield site.

=== Post-World War II to the present ===
During the liberation, Benito Saavedra was appointed mayor of the newly restored Philippine government, then succeeded by the following in the order of incumbencies:

- Rufo Cumpio -1945
- Dioniso Boco - 1946
- Pelagio O. Tecson – 1946-1947

After the liberation period, Dionisio Boco became the first mayor, then succeeded by Pelagio O. Tecson Sr. In 1950, Barrio Haclagan, the site of the former US Airfield, was renamed Santo Niño.

Pelagio Tecson, Sr. was the mayor during the period of martial law in the Philippines up to February 25, 1986, the date of the EDSA Revolution, when Felix Cortez was appointed Officer-in-Charge (OIC) Mayor by the new government. The local elections held on February 1, 1988, resulted in the election of Charles R. Avila. It was during his tenure that he was appointed as Administrator of the Philippine Coconut Authority in January 1991, and Vice Mayor Rodolfo Cinco succeeded him as mayor.

In the May 1992 synchronized elections for national and local officials, Roque Tiu won over five candidates for the mayoralty position. Tiu was the chief executive of the town until his second term ended in 1998. Mark Gimenez was elected mayor from 1998 to 2001. During the 2001 elections, Tiu ran again and won over Gimenez, making Tiu mayor of the town for three consecutive terms from 2001 to 2010. After Tiu completed his term, his vice mayor, Agapito Pagayanan Jr., ran for the mayoralty position during the 2010 general elections and won. His term started in 2010 and ended in 2013. During the 2013 mid-term elections, Pelagio Tecson, Jr. won over the incumbent mayor with only a small margin of votes.

== Geography ==
=== Barangays ===
Tanauan is politically subdivided into 54 barangays Each barangay consists of puroks while some have sitios.

- Ada
- Amanluran
- Arado
- Atipolo
- Balud
- Bangon
- Bantagan
- Baras
- Binolo
- Binongto-an
- Bislig
- Buntay (Poblacion)
- Cabalagnan
- Cabarasan Guti
- Cabonga-an
- Cabuynan
- Cahumayhumayan
- Calogcog
- Calsadahay
- Camire
- Canbalisara
- Canramos (Poblacion)
- Catigbian
- Catmon
- Cogon
- Guindag-an
- Guingauan
- Hilagpad
- Lapay
- Licod (Poblacion)
- Limbuhan Daku
- Limbuhan Guti
- Linao
- Kiling
- Magay
- Maghulod
- Malaguicay
- Maribi
- Mohon
- Pago
- Pasil
- Picas
- Sacme
- San Miguel (Poblacion)
- Salvador
- San Isidro
- San Roque (Poblacion)
- San Victor
- Santa Cruz
- Santa Elena
- Santo Niño (Haclagan) (Poblacion)
- Solano
- Talolora
- Tugop

=== Climate ===
Climate data for Tanauan, Leyte
Month	Jan	Feb	Mar	Apr	May	Jun	Jul	Aug	Sep	Oct	Nov	Dec	Year
Mean daily maximum °C (°F)	28 (82)	28 (82)	29 (84)	30 (86)	30 (86)	30 (86)	29 (84)	30 (86)	30 (86)	29 (84)	29 (84)	28 (82)	29 (84)
Mean daily minimum °C (°F)	22 (72)	22 (72)	22 (72)	23 (73)	24 (75)	24 (75)	24 (75)	24 (75)	24 (75)	24 (75)	23 (73)	23 (73)	23 (74)
Average precipitation mm (inches)	90 (3.5)	67 (2.6)	82 (3.2)	70 (2.8)	97 (3.8)	145 (5.7)	142 (5.6)	127 (5.0)	132 (5.2)	152 (6.0)	169 (6.7)	144 (5.7)	1,417 (55.8)
Average rainy days	17.0	13.5	16.0	16.5	20.6	24.3	26.0	25.4	25.2	26.4	23.0	21.0	254.9
Source: Meteoblue

== Demographics ==
Population census of Tanauan

Year	Pop.	±% p.a.
1903	18,256	—
1918	18,880	+0.22%
1939	21,934	+0.72%
1948	24,573	+1.27%
1960	23,421	−0.40%
1970	29,438	+2.31%
1975	30,541	+0.74%
1980	31,487	+0.61%

Year	Pop.	±% p.a.
1990	38,033	+1.91%
1995	40,716	+1.29%
2000	45,056	+2.20%
2007	47,426	+0.71%
2010	50,119	+2.03%
2015	55,021	+1.79%
2020	57,455	+0.92%
2024	60,212	+1.13%

Source: Philippine Statistics Authority

In the 2024 census, the population of Tanauan was 60,212 people, with a density of 770 inhabitants per square kilometre or 2,000 inhabitants per square mile.

=== Language ===
Waray-waray is the language spoken by the people of Tanauan. It is the lingua franca or common language of the Eastern Visayas region. However, Tagalog is widely understood and spoken by the locals when talking to other people coming from Manila and other Philippine provinces. English remains the language used by the local government and schools on official correspondences and documents. Waray-waray is used as a medium of instruction in schools in the municipality from Kindergarten to Grade 3. Filipino and English languages are officially taught in schools as part of the primary and secondary education curriculum requirement.

=== Religion ===
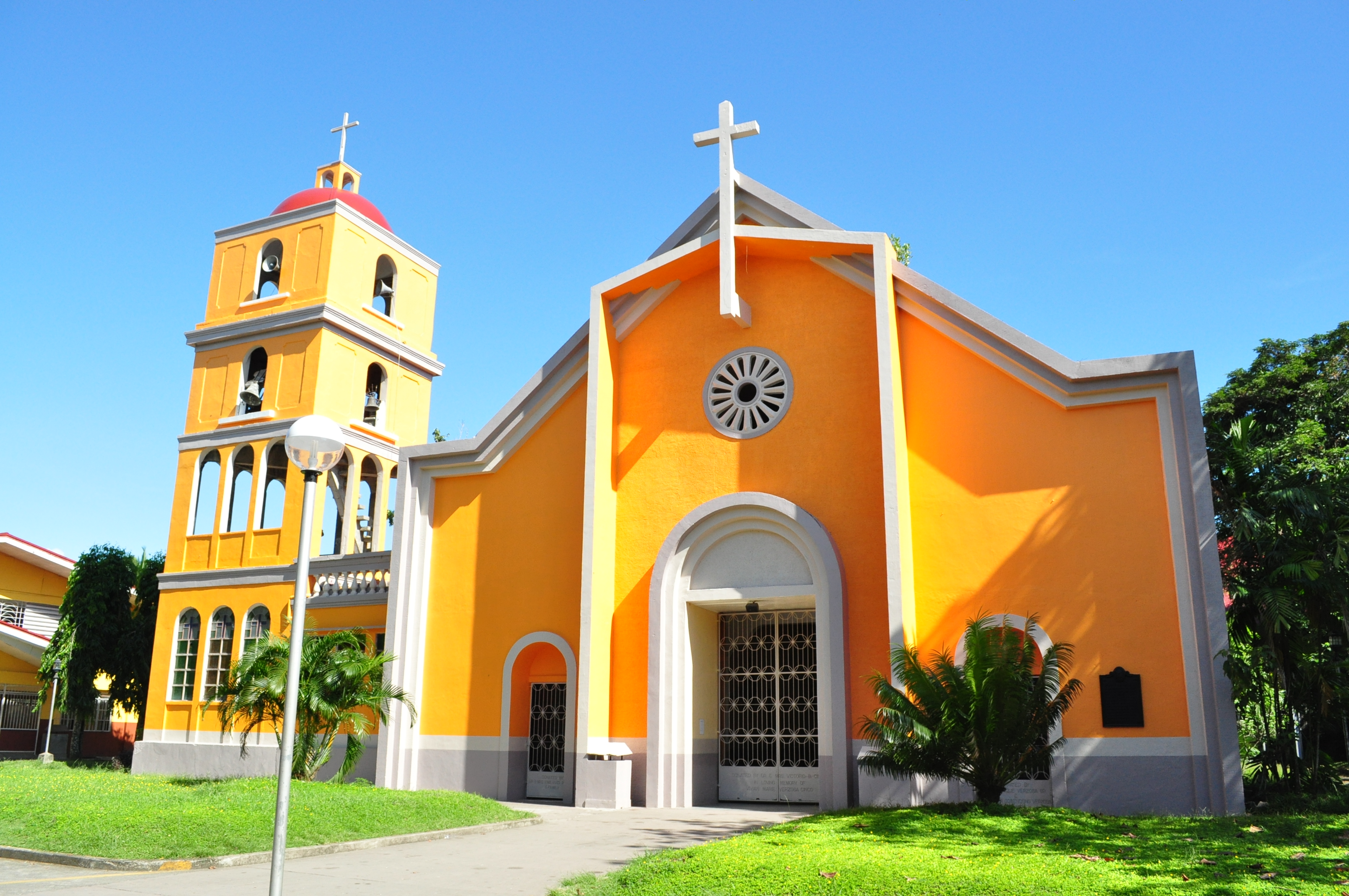
Our Lady of the Assumption Parish Church is the primary Catholic church in the municipality.

Tanauan has a 100% Christian population. Almost 96-97% of the municipality's population are Roman Catholics. Every village has its own Roman Catholic chapel aside from the parish church in the town proper. There are also adherents of other Christian denominations and sects like the Iglesia ni Cristo, The Church of Jesus Christ of Latter-Day Saints (Mormons), Seventh-day Adventists (Sabadistas), Evangelicals (Born-Again Christians), Jehovah's Witnesses (Mga Saksi ni Jehova) and many more.

The municipality's patron saint is Our Lady of the Assumption (Nuestra Señora de la Asunción).

== Economy ==
Poverty incidence of Tanauan (%)

Source: Philippine Statistics Authority

In 2005, the municipality registered a total income of PHP 47.6 million. This went up to PHP 56.4 million in 2007, representing an average annual increase of over 9%, mostly coming from considerable increases in local taxes, permits and licenses, and the Internal Revenue Allotment. This economic performance was attributed largely to the reforms and initiatives introduced by Mayor Roque Tiu, which streamlined the processes of getting business and license permits.

As a result of these reforms, the municipality of Tanauan also earned the "2006 Most Business-Friendly Municipality in the Country" award during the closing rites of the 32nd Philippine Business Conference held at the Manila Hotel on October 20, 2006. Then President Gloria Arroyo handed the award to Mayor Tiu and his wife, PIA-8 Director Olive Tiu. Prior to winning the award, the municipality of Tanauan was also adjudged as the Most Business-Friendly Municipality in the Visayas Area.

The businesses and industries that support Tanauan's local economy are from agriculture, livestock, fishing, forestry and mining, trade and industry, and tourism.

The major investors in the municipality are the following:

- Pepsi Cola (Tanauan plant)
- Wella Metal Corporation
- New Leyte Edible Oil Manufacturing Corporation

=== Local industries and crafts ===
Tanauan is known for various locally made crafts, which include bamboo-craft, mat-weaving, bolos, brooms, hats, bricks, pottery, nipa shingles, and virgin coconut oil—most of which are made of local and indigenous materials. These trades have been the source of local pride, as by the brick and pottery makers of Barangay Canramos. Tanauan is also one of the best sources of clay in the region. These trades are mainly promoted by the Tanauan Women's Club federation with the support of the municipal government.

== Elected Officials ==
2025-2028 Tanauan, Leyte Officials
Position	Name	Party
Mayor	Ma. Gina E. Merilo	NPC
Vice Mayor	Archie Lawrence R. Kapunan	NPC
Councilors	Jan Elmer V. Magdalaga	Lakas
Councilors	Mark Christian Ferdinand L. Gimenez	Lakas
Councilors	Mae Jane Angelie M. Morabe-Borais	NPC
Councilors	Cherry Anne T. Fiel	Lakas
Councilors	Mark Efren E. Merilo	Lakas
Councilors	Quintin T. Octa Jr.	NPC
Councilors	Josie M. Creer	Lakas
Councilors	Lauro A. Villero	Lakas
Ex Officio Municipal Council Members
ABC President	Ma. Martina L. Gimenez	Nonpartisan
SK Federation President	TBD	Nonpartisan

== Infrastructure ==
=== Storm drainage system ===
Tanauan still lacks an efficient infrastructure for its storm drainage system. Although storm drainage projects were constructed in the past, it was poorly planned and maintained that resulted in a failure to prevent occasional flooding in various places within the town proper due to sedimentation and clogging of existing drainage canals.

=== Healthcare facilities ===
- Tanauan Birthing Facility

In 2009, Mayor Tiu constructed the birthing facility of Tanauan with assistance from the Japanese government. The project was funded through the Embassy of Japan's Grant Assistance for Grassroots Human Security Projects (GGP), with a grant of US$62,135 (approximately 3 million pesos). The facility was turned over to the local government of Tanauan on April 27, 2010. The Embassy of Japan's Minister for Economic Affairs, Tomochika Uyama, was present during the ceremony. The facility became operational in May 2010 and has since been providing appropriate and accessible medical services for pregnant women in Tanauan.

=== Utilities and telecommunications ===
The following are the telephone, mobile phone, and electric companies serving the area of Tanauan.

Telephone companies:

- Bayan Telecommunications, Inc.
- Eastern Visayas Telephone Company

Mobile phone service providers:

- Globe Telecom
- Smart Communications
- DITO

Electric companies:

- Don Orestes Romualdez Electric Cooperative (DORELCO)

Water supply:

- Leyte Metropolitan Water District (LMWD)
- Prime Water (PW)

=== Parks and playgrounds ===
Tanauan currently has one large municipal plaza, which is located at the heart of the town across the back of the old municipal hall. It has a mini-amphitheater and large outdoor grounds, which is often used as a venue for large open-air activities such as the annual Pasaka Festival Competition among other outdoor gatherings of the town. It also has two outdoor basketball courts and one outdoor tennis court complex. Surrounding the plaza are various centuries-old acacia trees that are one of the most well-preserved in the Eastern Visayas Region.

=== Transportation ===
Tanauan is accessible mainly by land through public-utility jeepneys. Taxis are also available from Tacloban City and the regional airport but generally have fares that cost higher. When travelling within Tanauan, pedicabs and tricycle cabs are available .

== Education ==
=== Primary school/Elementary school ===
- Tanauan I Central School (Public)
- Tanauan II Central School (Public)
- Salvador Central School (Public)

=== Secondary school/High school ===
- Assumption Academy (Private)
- Kiling National High School (Public)
- Tanauan School of Craftsmanship and Home Industries (Public)
- Tanauan National High School (Public)
- Tanauan School of Arts and Trade (Public)

=== College/University ===
- Eastern Visayas State University - Tanauan Campus (Public)

== Heritage and culture ==
=== Local customs and etiquettes ===
Most locals take off their slippers, shoes, or flip flops before entering a house. During weddings, it is customary for the bride and groom to do the traditional folk dance called Kuratsa, and members of the family and guests alike are encouraged to pin money on their attire as a symbol of good luck and prosperity for the couple's future. Tanauan-anons also observe fiesta celebrations annually in different barangays to honor their respective local Catholic saints. During the fiesta, it is a tradition to prepare food in every house and invite guests and visitors to share their meal as a sign of thanksgiving.

=== Church of Our Lady of the Assumption ===
The church is one of the six architectural heritage sites in Leyte. It was originally built by the Jesuit Missionaries in 1704 and was turned over to the Augustinians in the year 1768. Father Francisco de Paula Marquez spearheaded the repair and enlargement of the church from 1850 to 1860. He added a transept and constructed thick rock walls at the perimeter of the church with towers on each four corners for defense against pirates. The church survived a hurricane and the storm surge of 1897. The church takes pride in its Stations of the Cross made in Mexico using Spanish terracotta. The rectory and pulpit are also restored.

=== Pasaka Festival ===
The town's Pasaka Festival started in 1991. The word "pasaka" means "assumption", referring to the Virgin Mary's assumption into heaven. The festival, which runs from August 1 to 15, is seen as an opportunity to showcase the town's rich cultural heritage. It is a means of paying homage and thanksgiving to the town's patroness, Our Lady of the Assumption. It begins with a nightly cultural presentation held from August 1 to 14 at the Tanauan Public Plaza, which showcases the best talents, culture, and tradition of the municipality, participated in by various schools, the local government unit, and non-government organizations of Tanauan.

In the afternoon of August 14, the traditional Pasaka Festival competition is held, which features a colorful presentation of a dance drama and street-dancing that depicts a community paying homage to the Blessed Virgin's Assumption. The competition is grouped into three categories: the Senior category, participated in by high school students, and the Junior category, composed of elementary pupils and the general public of merry makers. The festival culminates on August 15, the Feast of the town's patroness, and a Holy Mass celebrated at the Our Lady of the Assumption Parish Church. It is also observed as Tanauan Day, a local holiday.

=== Tinikling and its possible origins in Tanauan ===
Tinikling is the most popular and best known of Philippine dances and honored as the Philippine national dance. It is one of the oldest Philippine traditional dances and originated in Leyte province. The people of Leyte describe the tikling bird, from which the tinikling dance got its name, as having one of the most unique movements—walking around and between tree branches and grass stems. Tinikling, the creative dance of Leyteños, imitate this bird's movement through branches and stems with the use of bamboo poles.

In 2006, then-Mayor Tiu's attention was called regarding the 2005 calendar of the Philippine National Oil Corporation entitled sulyap (glimpse), which highlighted looking back into the homes of Filipino culture and taking a glimpse into one's roots in relation to moving forward in life. The second page of the calendar (March–April page) featured the Tinikling with this brief description in Filipino: ...”ang Tinikling ay nagmula sa Tanauan, Leyte. Isa ito sa mga pinaka-kilalang Pilipinong sayaw sa buong mundo. Ang pagkamalikhain ng mga taga Leyte ay nagbigay buhay sa simpleng galaw ng ibong tikling, kung saan nakuhaang pangalan ng sayaw. Sa Tinikling naipamalas ang likas na halina at pagiging masayahin na nabubukod-tangi sa mga Pilipino.” Since then, the municipal government of Tanauan requested historians and enthusiasts of culture and the arts to shed light on the issue, so that the local government can initiate moves towards preserving the culture of the municipality. Tanauan has been called the “Cradle of Intellectuals” or "Bungto Han Kamag-araman" ever since the Spanish era. Another version of the story has it that the Tinikling originated in Tanauan, Leyte, but particularly in Barangay Kiling. The name “Kiling” is also derived from the tikling bird. This version of the story has yet to be authenticated. Today, pinpointing the exact origin of this dance still remains elusive.

Anthologist and poet Vicente I. De Veyra, a native of Leyte, collected folk songs in his book Mga Ambahan, which included one titled "Tinikling".

=== Skimboarding ===
Tanauan is recognized as the “Skimboarding Capital of the Philippines". It is told by oral tradition that skimboarding was first introduced in Tanauan in 2001, when a Palau national came to Tanauan to win the heart of a local lass. Since Tanauan is situated along the coast facing San Pedro Bay, the Palau national started making a skimboard. However, he was not able to teach the local youths how to use it since he needed to leave and go back to Palau. He left the skimboard, and the local youths started to train themselves on how to use it. Thereafter, young people from Barangay San Roque and Barangay Santo Niño started making prototypes of the skimboard which were then sold to enthusiasts. However, according to the locals, in the year December 1999 skimboarding was already being seen on Tanauan's shore before the Palau national came to the town. They called it "sulinap", using a plastic floater from a scrap of jetski, without knowing that the sport they were playing was called skimboarding. The first skimboarding competition was organized by Darwin Maceda with his friends Alexander Cumpio and Nerizza Reynera at Tanauan's Bantay Dagat area on March 31, 2002.

== Notable personalities ==
- Jaime C. de Veyra - Resident Commissioner to the U.S. House of Representatives from the Philippine Islands from 1917 to 1923 and the 1st Governor of Leyte
- Vicente I. de Veyra - Waray-language poet, anthologist, orthographer and phonetician
