= Caparangasan =

Island in the Philippines

- Location within Philippines

Geography
- Coordinates: 11°58′11″N 124°42′9″E
- Adjacent to: Samar Sea
- Area: 3.5 km^{2} (1.4 sq mi)
- Length: 2 km (1.2 mi)
- Width: 2 km (1.2 mi)
- Coastline: 6 km (3.7 mi)
- Highest elevation: 4 m (13 ft)

Administration
- Philippines
- Region: Eastern Visayas
- Province: Samar
- District: 1st District of Samar
- Municipality: Gandara, Samar

Additional information
- Code 08-60-07-023

Caparangasan is an island barangay located in Gandara, Samar province of the Philippines.

== Geography and climate ==
Caparangasan is situated in the central western and also coastal part of the island of Samar within the Philippine Sea and archipelago. It is bordered by Lungib to the south, Napalisan to the west, Sondara Island to the north, and Malayog to the east.

It has a total area of approximately 3.5 square kilometres (350 ha) of flat coastal plain terrain with an elevation ranging from 0 to 4 metres (0 to 13 ft) above the sea level. It experiences a variety of wind types: the Amihan, from northeast, the Timog, from south, the Habagat, from southwest, the Canaway, from northwest, the Cabunghan from east, the Dumagsa, from southeast, and the Salatan from the west. It has distributed rainfall throughout the year, except during the summer months, from February through May, when it is dry.
