= De Veyra =

De Veyra is a surname. Notable people with the surname include:

- Jaime C. de Veyra (1873–1963), Filipino politician, lawyer, historian, linguist, and educator
- Sofia de Veyra (1876–1953), Filipina feminist, clubwoman, teacher, and school founder
- Vicente I. de Veyra (1888–1975), Waray-language poet, anthologist, and orthographer
- Lourd de Veyra (born 1975), Filipino musician, singer, poet, and journalist
