= Tanauan =

Tanauan may refer to either of two places in the Philippines:

- Tanauan, Batangas
- Tanauan, Leyte
