= Karabaw Festival =

Annual festival in the Philippines

The Karabaw Festival (English: Carabao Festival; Filipino: Písta ng Kalabaw) is a festival of Gandara, Samar, Philippines.
