= Ramon T. Diaz National High School =

Public high school in Samar, Philippines

Location
- Adela Heights; Gandara, Samar 6706; Philippines; 12°00′50″N 124°48′31″E

Information
- Type: Public
- Established: 1970
- President: PTA President
- Enrollment: (7-12)

The Ramon T. Diaz National High School (RTDNHS) is a public secondary school located in Brgy. Adela Heights, Gandara, Samar, Philippines.

== History ==
The institution's original name was Gandara National High School (GNHS) established in 1970. This was later changed to Ramon T. Diaz Memorial High School (RTDMHS) in honor and memory of the late mayor of the town, Ramon T. Diaz, son of then Gandara icon Filadelfo T. Diaz. In 2019, the school administration, pursuant to the directive of Department of Education, officially changed the word "memorial" to "national".
