= San Joaquin, Palo =

Barangay In Palo, Leyte

Barangay San Joaquin
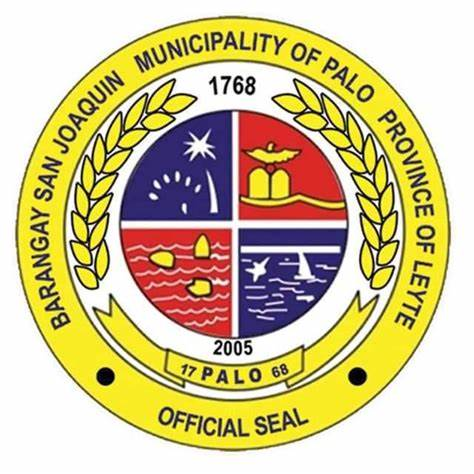
- Seal
- Country: Philippines
- Region: Eastern Visayas
- Province: Leyte
- Town: Palo

Government
  - Type: Barangay
- Elevation: 5.8 m (19 ft)

Population
  - Total: 2,844
- Postal code: 6501

Barangay San Joaquin is a barangay in the municipality of Palo, Leyte in the Philippines. The barangay has the St. Joachim Parish.

== Establishments ==
=== Government establishments ===
- San Joaquin Central School
- San Joaquin Elementary School
- San Joaquin High School
- San Joaquin Barangay Hall

=== Religious centers ===
- San Joachim Parish
- Iglesia Ni Cristo - Lokal ng San Joaquin

=== Businesses ===
- CS1 Pro Audio
- San Joaquin Bakery
- Jocelyn's Tablea
- Mr J. Music Bar
- Staroil - San Joaquin
- Shell - San Joaquin
- Freq IT Solutions
- The PS Palm Villa

=== Roads ===
- Eastern Nautical Highway

== San Joachim Parish ==
San Joachim Parish
- San Joaquin Parish
- Location: Palo, Leyte
- Country: Philippines
- Denomination: Catholic

History
- Status: Parish church
- Founded: 1973
- Founder: Fr. Jaime Segun
- Dedication: Saint Joachim

Architecture
- Functional status: Active

Administration
- Archdiocese: Palo

Clergy
- Archbishop: John F. Du
- Priest: Randolf A. Raagas

San Joachim Parish (or San Joaquin Parish) is a parish at the barangay of San Joaquin, Palo, Leyte. It was founded on January 14, 1973.

Rev Fr. Jaime Segun was installed as the parish priest by the decree of Bishop Salvador, Archbishop Pedro Dean accepted the addition of Nine barangays to the Parish.

The parish was canonically erected on June 4, 1997,
