= N678 highway (Philippines) =

Road in the Philippines

Guiuan-Sulangan Peninsula Road

Route information
- Length: 19.224 km (11.945 mi)

Major junctions
- North end: N676 (Borongan-Guiuan Road) in Guiuan, Eastern Samar
- South end: Sulangan Peninsula

Location
- Country: Philippines
- Provinces: Eastern Samar
- Towns: Guiuan

Highway system
- Roads in the Philippines; Highways; Expressways; List

National Highway 678, also known as the Guiuan-Sulangan Peninsula Road, is a national secondary highway part of the Philippine highway network. The highway traverses Guiuan, particularly its poblacion, Calicoan Island, and Leleboon Island. An attempt for the road to become national was made, but it was only until July 6, 2017, that the highway gained national secondary status. The highway has faced rehabilitation efforts and was part of seawall projects and the construction of a bridge in Barangay Pagnamitan.

== Route description ==
Few kilometers northeast of the ending of the Borongan-Guiuan Road, the Guiuan-Sulangan Peninsula Road starts at Guiuan's poblacion. The road has a length of 19.22 kilometres (11.94 miles). Going southeast, the highway crosses few local roads before turning northeast then turning back southeast. Shortly after, the highway turns northeast again before turning southeast and curving northeast. Subsequently, the road turns south and east, crossing to Calicoan Island. The road traverses the island, passing through the island barangays of Pagnamitan, Baras, Ngolos, and Sulangan. Before reaching Sulangan, the road makes a sharp right turn to the barangay's center. The road then crosses into Leleboon Island through Sulangan Bridge, before ending in Deria Street.

== History ==
In 1985, an attempt to make the road national was made, but the action was not done until 2017. Three years later, an act was made by the House of Representatives of the Philippines requesting for the road to be improved.by Congressman Jose T. Ramirez to the Department of Public Works and Highways. Eventually, through Department Order No. 83 of DPWH signed by Mark Villar, the road was declared a national road on July 6, 2017. On July 5, 2022, a 252-meter seawall was built in Barangay Pagnamitan with a cost of 29.64 million PHP, improving access along the road and protecting residents of the barangay from storm surge. Along with the seawall, the first phase of the Pagnamitan Bridge—connecting mainland Guiuan and Calicoan Island—was finished. The construction of the bridge had a budget of 96,499,952 PHP. Plans were also made to rehabilitate the road in 2024 and 2025.
