= Samar Day =

Samar Day is a Foundation Day celebrated in Samar Province, Philippines. It is currently celebrated on 11 August, but festivities start several days earlier.

== Background ==
Samar Day was initially celebrated on 10 November to commemorate the 1967 election of the first officials of the province, then known as Western Samar, two years after the division of the old province of Samar. During the Marcos period of martial law, the date of the celebration was moved to August 23. The date was changed again when it was moved to 11 August in the late 1970s to honor the day that the Queen Isabella II of Spain established Samar as a separate province from Leyte.

== Celebrations and events ==
=== Mutya Han Samar ===
Mutya Han Samar is a provincial-wide beauty pageant held annually (since 1980) on August 9 in Catbalogan, the provincial capital of Samar, Philippines. The pageant is one of the activities of the Samar Day celebrations.
