= Palo, Leyte =

Municipality and seat of government of Leyte, Philippines

Palo
- Municipality
- Municipality of Palo
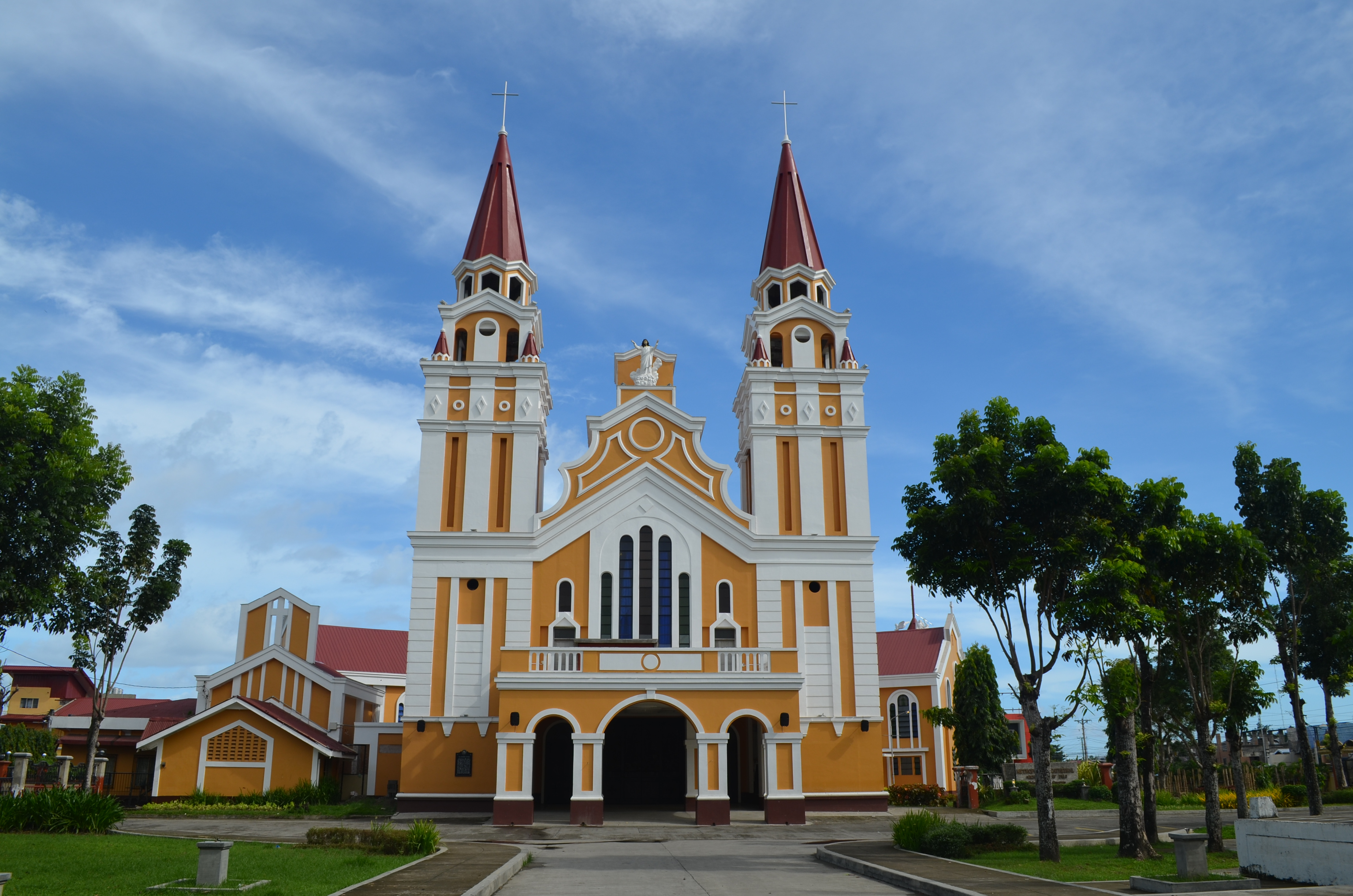
- Palo Cathedral

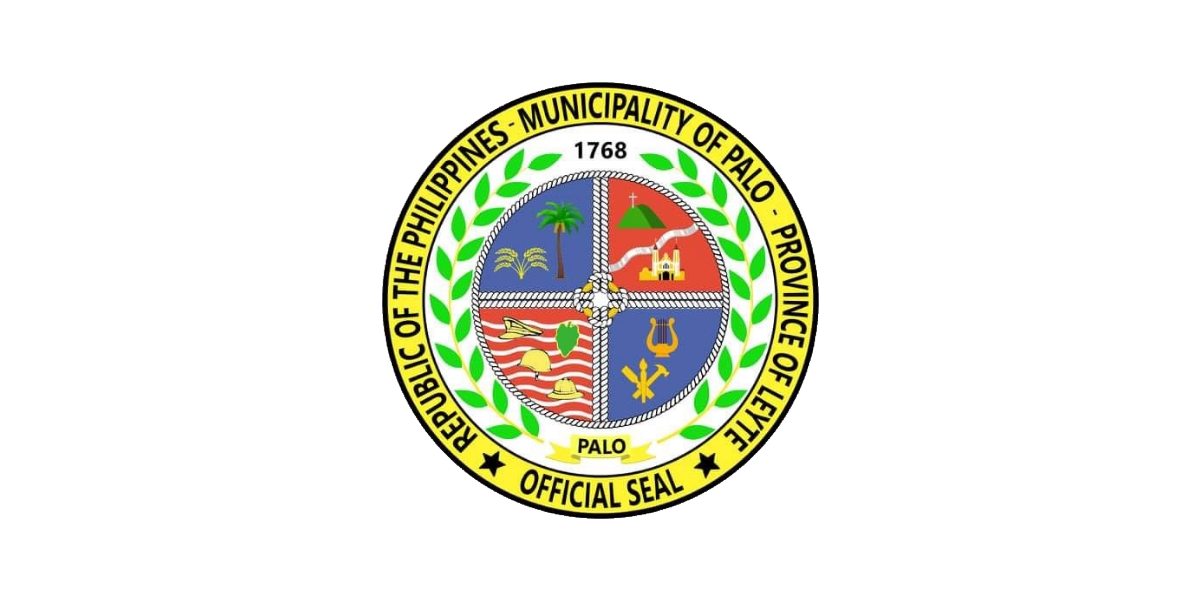
- Flag Seal

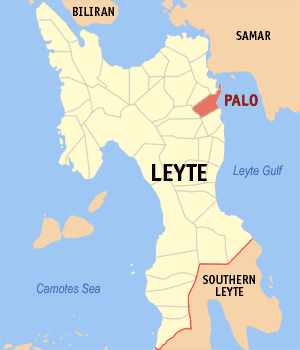
- Map of Leyte with Palo highlighted
- Interactive map of Palo
- Location within the Philippines
- Coordinates: 11°09′30″N 124°59′30″E
- Country: Philippines
- Region: Eastern Visayas
- Province: Leyte
- District: 1st district
- Founded: 1596 (as a Jesuit mission) 1768 (as a town)
- Barangays: 33 (see Barangays)

Government
  - Type: Sangguniang Bayan
  - Mayor: Remedios Loreto Petilla (NPC)
  - Vice Mayor: Jonathan Chiquillo (LP)
  - Representative: Ferdinand Martin G. Romualdez
  - Councilors: List: • Jonathan P. Chiquillo; • Chiqui Ruth C. Uy; • Magdalena M. Torres; • Gregorio P. Dolina; • Aaron H. Roca; • Imelda B. Parado; • Felipe T. Ygrubay; • Jon Jezreel S. Agner; DILG Masterlist of Officials
  - Electorate: 43,669 voters (2025)

Area
  - Total: 221.27 km^{2} (85.43 sq mi)
- Elevation: 14 m (46 ft)
- Highest elevation: 388 m (1,273 ft)
- Lowest elevation: 0 m (0 ft)

Population (2024 census)
  - Total: 80,291
  - Density: 362.86/km^{2} (939.81/sq mi)
  - Households: 17,950

Economy
  - Income class: 1st municipal income class
  - Poverty incidence: 20.52% (2023)
  - Revenue: ₱ 386.8 million (2024)
  - Assets: ₱ 1,322 million (2024)
  - Expenditure: ₱ 366 million (2024)
  - Liabilities: ₱ 307.8 million (2024)

Service provider
  - Electricity: Leyte 2 Electric Cooperative (LEYECO 2)
- Time zone: UTC+8 (PST)
- ZIP code: 6501
- PSGC: 0803739000
- IDD : area code: +63 (0)53
- Native languages: Waray; Tagalog
- Website: www.palo-leyte.gov.ph

Palo, (Note: IPA: [pɐ'loʔ) officially the Municipality of Palo, (Note: Waray: Bungto han Palo; Tagalog: Bayan ng Palo) is a municipality and the seat of government of the province of Leyte. According to the 2024 census, it has a population of 80,291 people, making it the most populous municipality in the province.

The municipality hosts the new Leyte Provincial Capitol, though Tacloban remains the official capital. It also houses most regional government offices for Eastern Visayas (Region VIII). Additionally, Palo is the ecclesiastical seat of the Archdiocese of Palo, housing its residence and seminaries.

== Etymology ==
According to existing records those who went to Kutay after the tribal war in Bunga were all equipped with palo, a sort of club for fighting or self-protection. Being the settlement of a tribe with palos, this is likely the reason why the community was known as "Palo".

However, the late Justice Norberto Romualdez, in an issue of Noli Me Tangere, a Tacloban-based newspaper of that time, asserted on June 9, 1909, that this town was named Palo because of its many carpenters sporting hammers (mazo or palo).

Believers in superstition and the supernatural ascribe the origin of the Palo name to the town's experience during pre-Spanish time often being visited by typhoons every eight (walo) days. They called the phenomenon walo-walo, hence walo-palo (eight-hammer).

== History ==
The first settlers of Palo were the tribes Panganuron, Kadampog, Manlangit, Kamagung, Kawaring, Kabalhin, Kumagang Maglain, Bilyo and Dilyo. They lived peacefully in an area resembling the shape of a bridge in what is now Barrio Bunga (present-day San Joaquin), which spanned an area on both sides of the river bearing the same name. As the population increased, tribal feuds would cause the people to disperse. Survivors would settle in Payapay, and others in Canpetik. The bulk went to Kutay. Those in Kutay would eventually establish the town of Palo.

=== Barangay and pueblo ===
The settlers in Kutay moved to Bangon river and there started the first barrio, Barangay de Palo, in 1521. Barangay de Palo would then become Pueblo de Palo in 1768. Its first elected gobernadorcillo was Capitan Balasabas. The first curate was R. P. Fray Matias Rosel, O.S.A., an Augustinian friar from Andalucia, Spain.

The Missions

In October 1596, the Jesuit Frs. Cristobal Jimenez and Francisco Encinas left Dulag and traversed Leyte's eastern coast towards Palo They were accompanied by principales Don Alonso Ambuyao and four others. They found there only two small houses used by the two servants of the encomenderos. A few boys that attended the mission schools in Dulag welcomed the two priests and taught them the dialect. These missionaries opened the first school in Palo and taught the children to play the flute. Later when Fr. Encinas was called to Carigara, Fr. Jimenez carried on alone until Bro. Miguel Gomez arrived to help him.

Fr. Jimenez learned enough of the local language to be understood but his influence was limited in "his mission area" to only a few. The people probably suspected him of being a tax collector. For a long time the natives avoided him and resisted all his attempts at friendship. Nothing he did or offered to do for them seemed to breakdown their distrust him and he was distressed and worried at their antipathy.

In his rounds of the villages, he noticed that there were many sick of which the greater the number succumbed to diseases for lack of medical attention. This observation gave him an idea. At that time, medical service was very expensive and available only to families of means for they alone could afford to pay work animals, slaves, or the equivalent of the patient's ransom. if he were captured.

Palo is well known as the site of Gen. Douglas MacArthur's return to the Philippines together with Philippine and American military forces after a period of exile in 1944. Hill 522, a hill located near the town center, was the site of fierce fighting between Allied and Japanese forces during the Second World War. The metropolitan cathedral of the archdiocese, located right across Palo's municipal hall, was used as a hospital for wounded Filipino and American forces. A memorial now stands at the beach site where MacArthur and his troops landed, locally known as MacArthur Park. The first Gabaldon Building is also situated in Barangay San Joaquin, Palo, Leyte. It was inaugurated by President Sergio Osmeña.

Palo was also once the capital of Leyte. The town's Purissima Bridge was the first steel bridge built in the province.

In 1957, sitio Campitic was converted into a barrio, while barrio Baras-Candahug was divided into two: Baras and Candahug. Barrio Malirong was renamed as Libertad.

=== Typhoon Haiyan ===
On November 8, 2013, Palo was severely struck by Typhoon Haiyan (Yolanda), which destroyed a large portion of Eastern Visayas and killed a number of residents in the town. On January 17, 2015, Pope Francis visited the town as part of his papal visit to the Philippines to meet with the surviving victims of the typhoon. He also blessed the Pope Francis Center for the Poor and met with priests, seminarians, other religious figures, and surviving victims of the typhoon at the Palo Cathedral before leaving Leyte.

== Geography ==
The municipality is located in the north-eastern part of the province of Leyte, 8 miles from the capital city of Tacloban.

=== Barangays ===
Palo is politically subdivided into 33 barangays. Each barangay consists of puroks and some have sitios.

- Anahaway
- Arado
- Baras
- Barayong
- Cabarasan Daku
- Cabarasan Guti
- Campetic
- Candahug
- Cangumbang
- Canhidoc
- Capirawan
- Castilla
- Cogon
- San Joaquin
- Gacao
- Guindapunan
- Libertad
- Naga-naga
- Pawing
- Buri (Poblacion barangay)
- Cavite East (Pob. barangay)
- Cavite West (Poblacion)
- Luntad (Poblacion)
- Santa Cruz (Poblacion)
- Salvacion
- San Agustin
- San Antonio
- San Isidro
- San Jose
- St. Michael (Poblacion)
- Tacuranga
- Teraza
- San Fernando

=== Climate ===
Climate data for Palo, Leyte
| Month | Jan | Feb | Mar | Apr | May | Jun | Jul | Aug | Sep | Oct | Nov | Dec | Year |
|---|---|---|---|---|---|---|---|---|---|---|---|---|---|
| Mean daily maximum °C (°F) | 28 (82) | 28 (82) | 29 (84) | 30 (86) | 30 (86) | 30 (86) | 29 (84) | 30 (86) | 30 (86) | 29 (84) | 29 (84) | 28 (82) | 29 (84) |
| Mean daily minimum °C (°F) | 22 (72) | 22 (72) | 22 (72) | 23 (73) | 24 (75) | 24 (75) | 24 (75) | 24 (75) | 24 (75) | 24 (75) | 23 (73) | 23 (73) | 23 (74) |
| Average precipitation mm (inches) | 90 (3.5) | 67 (2.6) | 82 (3.2) | 70 (2.8) | 97 (3.8) | 145 (5.7) | 142 (5.6) | 127 (5.0) | 132 (5.2) | 152 (6.0) | 169 (6.7) | 144 (5.7) | 1,417 (55.8) |
| Average rainy days | 17.0 | 13.5 | 16.0 | 16.5 | 20.6 | 24.3 | 26.0 | 25.4 | 25.2 | 26.4 | 23.0 | 21.0 | 254.9 |
Source: Meteoblue

== Demographics ==
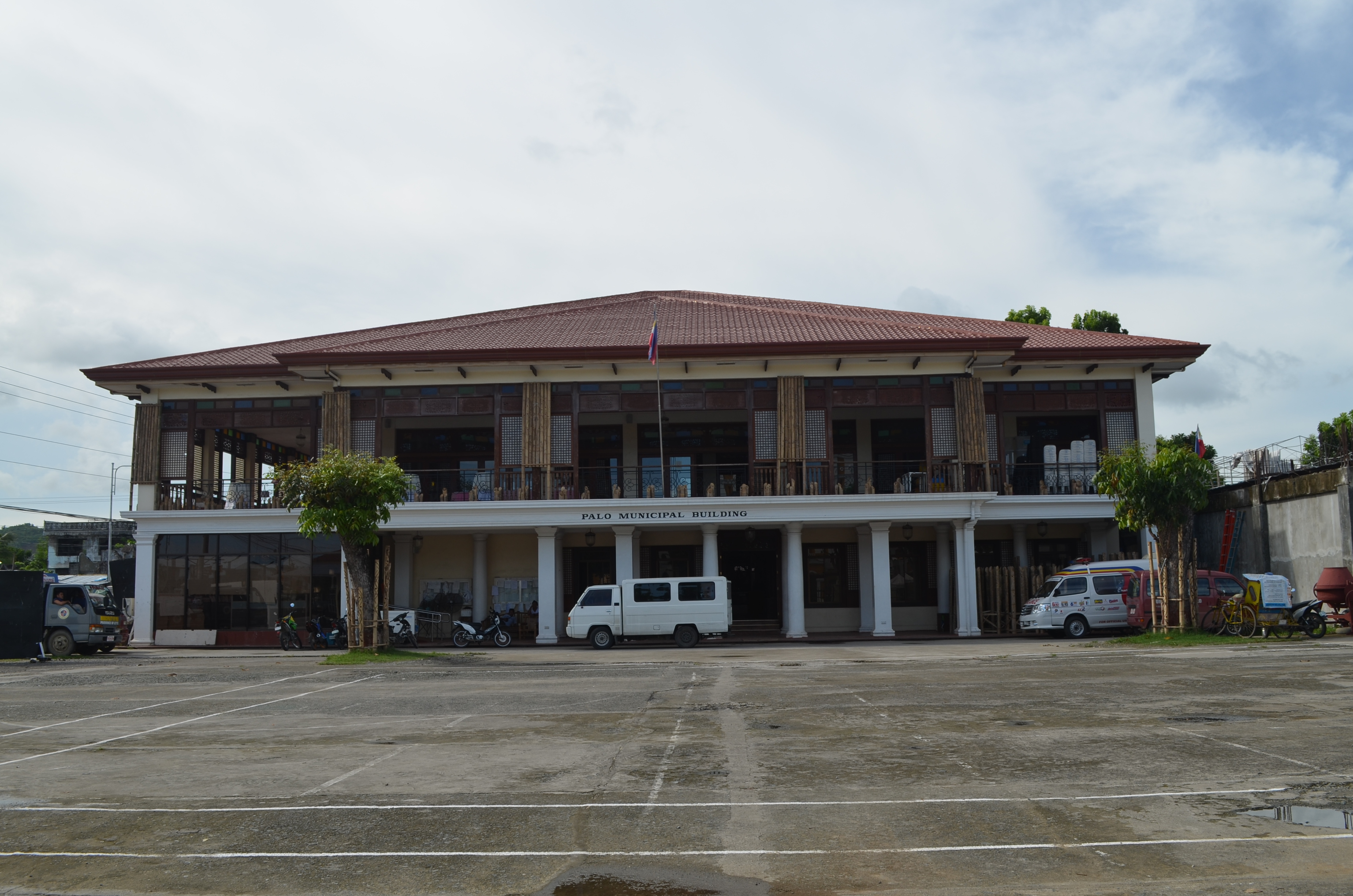
The Palo Municipal Building

Population census of Palo

| Year | Pop. | ±% p.a. |
|---|---|---|
| 1903 | 17,480 | — |
| 1918 | 20,518 | +1.07% |
| 1939 | 25,471 | +1.04% |
| 1948 | 27,253 | +0.75% |
| 1960 | 25,325 | −0.61% |
| 1970 | 26,063 | +0.29% |
| 1975 | 26,218 | +0.12% |
| 1980 | 31,124 | +3.49% |

| Year | Pop. | ±% p.a. |
|---|---|---|
| 1990 | 38,100 | +2.04% |
| 1995 | 43,095 | +2.34% |
| 2000 | 47,982 | +2.33% |
| 2007 | 56,781 | +2.35% |
| 2010 | 62,727 | +3.69% |
| 2015 | 70,052 | +2.13% |
| 2020 | 76,213 | +1.79% |
| 2024 | 80,291 | +1.26% |

Source: Philippine Statistics Authority

In the 2024 census, the population of Palo was 80,291 people, with a density of 360 inhabitants per square kilometre or 930 inhabitants per square mile.

Literacy rate in Palo is 99.5%.

The town's native language is Waray-Waray, the major language and lingua franca in the Eastern Visayas region.

=== Religion ===
Palo is the seat of the ecclesiastical province, the Archdiocese, where the Roman Catholic archbishop resides in Bukid Tabor. One can also find the archdiocese's Metropolitan Cathedral in Palo. Meanwhile, Palo is also a seedbed of vocations to the priesthood with the Sacred Heart Seminary and the St. John the Evangelist School of Theology. Two Paloan nuns also became Superiors General in their respective congregations. To date, there are 158 ordained priests and 106 nuns from the town alone.

== Economy ==
Poverty incidence of Palo (%)

Source: Philippine Statistics Authority

Palo is the seat of the 6.8-hectare Leyte Information and Communications Technology (ICT) Park and the 22-hectare Leyte Mikyu Economic Zone. The Leyte ICT Park hosts two BPOs while the Leyte Mikyu Ecozone is undergoing development.

The town's historic municipal building was the former seat of the Provincial Government of Leyte.

Agriculture is the municipality's dominant industry. The area produces and ferments the local coconut wine called tubâ, especially the bahalina version.

== Elected Officials ==
2025-2028 Palo, Leyte Officials
| Position | Name | Party |
|---|---|---|
| Mayor | Remedios L. Petilla | NPC |
| Vice Mayor | Jonathan P. Chiquillo | Liberal |
| Councilors | Chiqui Ruth C. Uy | KANP |
| Councilors | Andres Ian R. Sevilla | Lakas |
| Councilors | Felipe T. Ygrubay Jr. | NPC |
| Councilors | Casimero B. Parado II | NPC |
| Councilors | Antonino C. Hernit | Tingog |
| Councilors | Casimero P. Villas Jr. | Lakas |
| Councilors | Panchito M. Cortez | Independent |
| Councilors | Aaron H. Roca | NPC |
Ex Officio Municipal Council Members
| ABC President | Gregorio Papoose V. Lantajo Jr. | Nonpartisan |
| SK Federation President | Mary Dwell S. Agner | Nonpartisan |

== Tourism ==
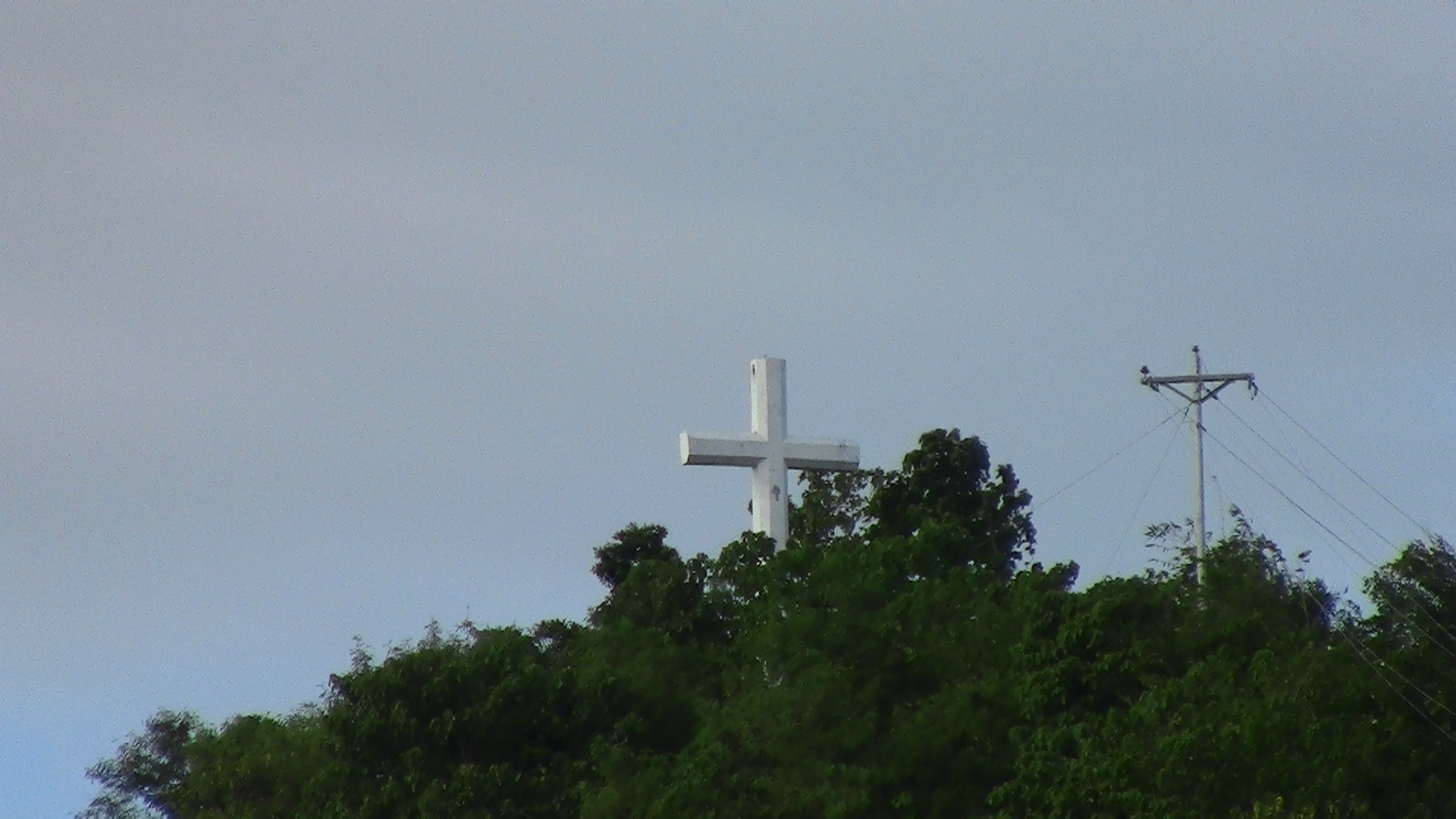
The giant cross at the top of Guinhangdan Hill

- MacArthur Landing Memorial National Park
- Guinhangdan Hill, a destination of Holy Week pilgrims. The hill is now a forest reserve.
- Japanese Shrine in Barangay Caloogan
- Red Beach - The landmark that has brought Palo to the annals of world history is the Red Beach, in barangay Candahug, where Gen. Douglas MacArthur first landed to liberate the Philippines from the Japanese occupation on October 20, 1944.
- WW2 Memorial for the Filipino Soldiers
- Palo Metropolitan Cathedral
- Palo Binangalan coral reefs
- Palo Mangrove Reservation (open season for duck hunting whole year round)
- Palo Municipal Library and Heritage Museum
- Korean Park
- "Tanggal" - In 2024, the Roman Catholic Archdiocese of Palo announced 60,000 pilgrims and tourists participated in the annual "Senakulo", the re-enactment or "Tanggal" on Good Friday which had been staged since 1974.
- "Tais-Dupol" - Taking center stage also, are the Good Friday "Tais-Dupol" penitents who are dressed in capirotes as “descendants of the former flagellants which abound during Holy Week in the 1600s (as attested to by the Jesuit chronicler-historian Pedro Chirino).” Fray Pantaleon de la Fuente, O.F.M. organized these barefoot flagellants in the 1800s.

== Sister city ==
Palo Alto, California, USA, has been a sister city of Palo, Leyte since 1963.

== Education ==
=== Private ===
- Saint Paul School of Professional Studies
- Sacred Heart Seminary
- St. John The Evangelist School of Theology
- Palo Angelicum
- St. Mary's Academy of Palo, Inc.
- St. Augustine College of Practical Nursing
- Bethel International School
- Zion Bible College
- AMA Computer College Tacloban
- ELA English Language Academy
- Alpha-Omega Learning Center
- St. Scholastica's College, Tacloban

=== Public ===
- University of the Philippines Manila School of Health Sciences in Leyte
- Philippine Science High School - Eastern Visayas Campus
- Palo National High School
- Palo Central School (Regular)
- Palo Central School (SPED)
- San Joaquin Central School
- San Joaquin National High School
- Libertad Elementary School
- Anahaway National High School
- Kauswagan National High School
- Kauswagan Elementary School
- Barayong Elementary School
- Luntad Elementary School
- Naga-Naga Elementary School
- Arado Elementary School
- Pawing Elementary School
- Guindapunan Elementary School
- Baras Elementary School
- Canhidoc Elementary School
- Palo National High School- Pawing Annex
- San Antonio Elementary School
- Cogon Elementary School
- Salvacion Elementary School
- San Fernando Elementary School
- Candahug Elementary School
- Caloogan Elementary School
- Teraza Elementary School

== Notable personalities ==
- Francisco Alvarado - Waray-language poet and playwright
- Ely Capacio - basketball player and coach
- Glenn Capacio - basketball player and coach
- Vicente I. de Veyra - Waray-language poet, anthologist, orthographer and phonetician
- Iluminado Lucente - Waray-language playwright
- Carmen Pedrosa - journalist and author
- Leopoldo Petilla - former governor of Leyte
