= Gandara, Samar =

Municipality in Samar, Philippines

Gandara
- Municipality
- Municipality of Gandara
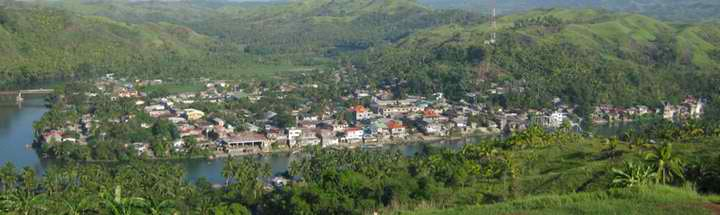
- Aerial view of the Poblacion

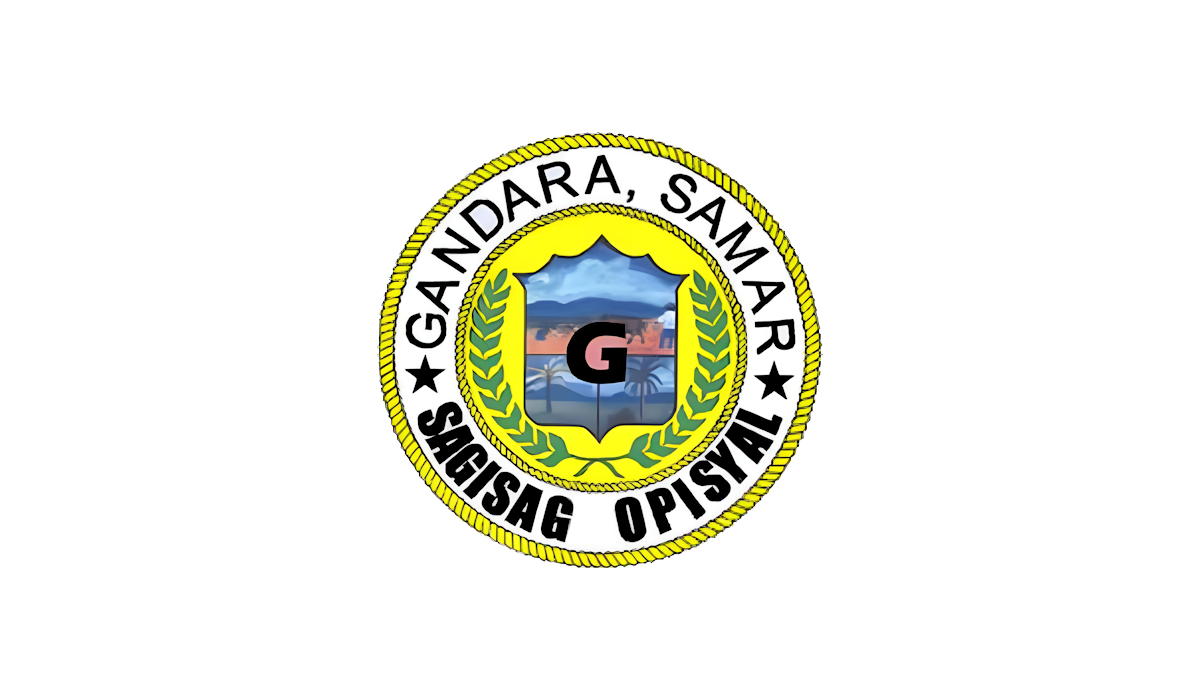
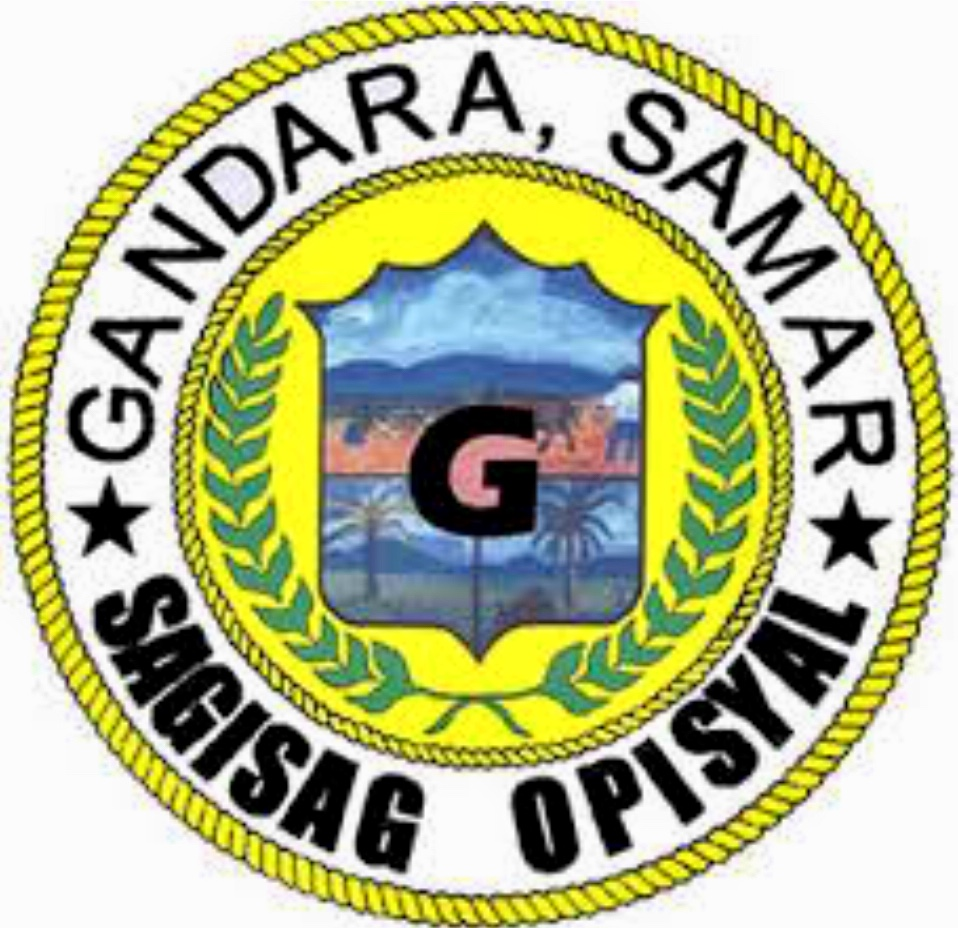
- Flag Seal
- Etymology: Bangahon
- Motto(s): An ungod nga Gandareño nahigugma ha bungto; ha sulod ha gawas permi malimpyo.
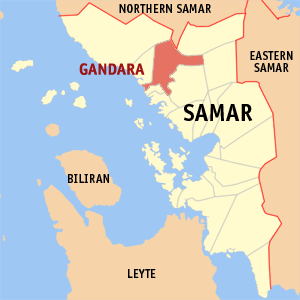
- Map of Samar with Gandara highlighted
- Interactive map of Gandara
- Location within the Philippines
- Coordinates: 12°00′47″N 124°48′42″E
- Country: Philippines
- Region: Eastern Visayas
- Province: Samar
- District: 1st district
- Named for: José de la Gándara y Navarro
- Barangays: 69 (see Barangays)

Government
  - Type: Sangguniang Bayan
  - Mayor: Warren Tan Aguilar
  - Vice Mayor: Elias Correche Delector
  - Representative: Stephen James Tan
  - Councilors: List: • Mark A. Agoy-agoy; • Jennelyn C. Berbes; • Miguel V. Ricalde; • Joel S. Oliva; • George S. Ramirez; • Emilio C. Romo; • Beatriz T. Cambe; • Rene C. Delector; DILG Masterlist of Officials
  - Electorate: 29,030 voters (2025)

Area
  - Total: 573.49 km^{2} (221.43 sq mi)
- Elevation: 120 m (390 ft)
- Highest elevation: 830 m (2,720 ft)
- Lowest elevation: 0 m (0 ft)

Population (2024 census)
  - Total: 36,826
  - Density: 64.214/km^{2} (166.31/sq mi)
  - Households: 7,834

Economy
  - Income class: 1st municipal income class
  - Poverty incidence: 38.43% (2023)
  - Revenue: ₱ 31.62 million (2024)
  - Assets: ₱ 65.36 million (2024)
  - Expenditure: ₱ 30.06 million (2024)

Service provider
  - Electricity: Samar 1 Electric Cooperative (SAMELCO 1)
- Time zone: UTC+8 (PST)
- ZIP code: 6706
- PSGC: 0806007000
- IDD : area code: +63 (0)55
- Native languages: Waray; Tagalog
- Website: www.lgugandarasamar.gov.ph

Gandara, officially the Municipality of Gandara (Waray: Bungto han Gandara, Tagalog: Bayan ng Gandara), is a municipality in the province of Samar, Philippines. According to the 2024 census, it has a population of 36,826 people.

== History ==
The town was formerly named Bangahon, but its population was resettled to its current location on September 29, 1902. After settling in its new location, the name Gandara was given to it in commemoration of the former Governor-General José de la Gándara y Navarro.

By virtue of Batas Pambansa Blg. 11 approved in 1978, 29 barangays were separated to create the new municipality of San Jorge.

== Geography ==
=== Barangays ===
Gandara is politically subdivided into 70 barangays. Each barangay consists of puroks and some have sitios.

- Adela Heights
- Arong 1
- Arong 2 (1998)
- Balocawe
- Bangahon
- Beslig
- Buao
- Bunyagan
- Burabod I
- Burabod II
- Calirocan
- Canhumawid
- Caparangasan
- Caranas
- Carmona
- Casab-ahan
- Casandig
- Catorse de Agosto
- Caugbusan
- Concepcion
- Diaz
- Dumalo-ong
- Elcano
- Gerali
- Gereganan
- Giaboc
- Hampton
- Hetebac
- Himamaloto
- Hinayagan
- Hinugacan
- Hiparayan
- Jasminez
- Lungib
- Mabuhay
- Macugo
- Malayog
- Marcos
- Minda
- Nacube
- Nalihugan
- Napalisan
- Natimonan
- Ngoso
- Palambrag
- Palanas
- Piñaplata
- Pizarro
- Pologon
- Purog
- Rawis
- Rizal
- Samoyao
- San Agustin
- San Antonio
- San Enrique
- San Francisco
- San Isidro
- San Jose
- San Miguel
- San Pelayo
- San Ramon
- Santa Elena
- Santo Niño
- Senibaran
- Sidmon
- Tagnao
- Tambongan
- Tawiran
- Tigbawon

Geo-Political Boundaries

- Gomezville (Home Owners Association)

=== Climate ===
Climate data for Gandara, Samar
Month	Jan	Feb	Mar	Apr	May	Jun	Jul	Aug	Sep	Oct	Nov	Dec	Year
Mean daily maximum °C (°F)	28 (82)	29 (84)	29 (84)	31 (88)	31 (88)	30 (86)	29 (84)	29 (84)	29 (84)	29 (84)	29 (84)	28 (82)	29 (85)
Mean daily minimum °C (°F)	21 (70)	21 (70)	21 (70)	22 (72)	24 (75)	24 (75)	24 (75)	25 (77)	24 (75)	24 (75)	23 (73)	22 (72)	23 (73)
Average precipitation mm (inches)	72 (2.8)	52 (2.0)	65 (2.6)	62 (2.4)	87 (3.4)	129 (5.1)	153 (6.0)	124 (4.9)	147 (5.8)	157 (6.2)	139 (5.5)	117 (4.6)	1,304 (51.3)
Average rainy days	17.4	13.4	16.8	18.0	22.0	25.3	26.2	24.2	24.9	26.0	23.3	20.8	258.3
Source: Meteoblue (modeled/calculated data, not measured locally)

== Demographics ==
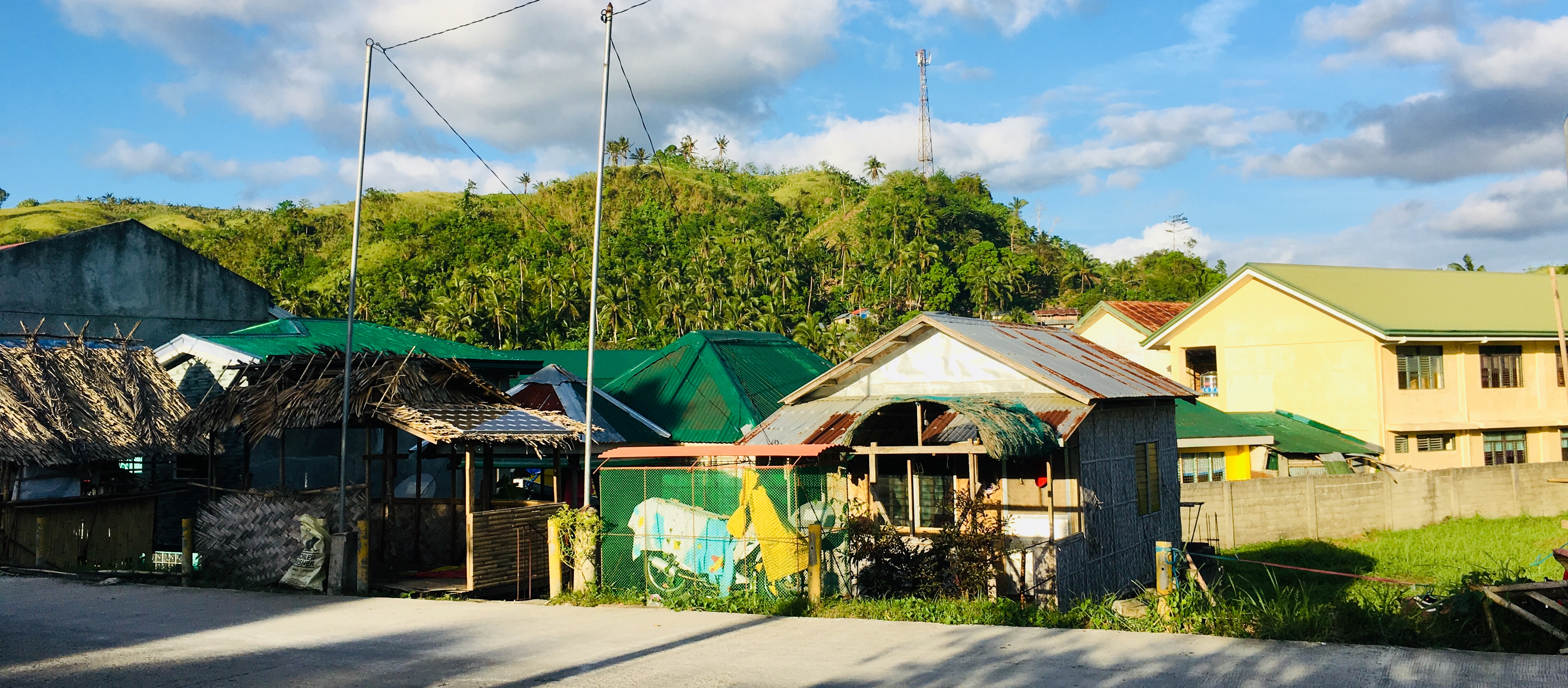
Downdown Gandara

Population census of Gandara
Year	Pop.	±% p.a.
1903	12,014	—
1918	14,320	+1.18%
1939	18,507	+1.23%
1948	25,048	+3.42%
1960	24,883	−0.06%
1970	28,307	+1.30%
1975	30,600	+1.57%
1980	24,764	−4.14%
1990	23,673	−0.45%
1995	27,263	+2.68%
2000	28,866	+1.23%
2007	31,222	+1.09%
2010	31,943	+0.83%
2015	34,434	+1.44%
2020	35,242	+0.49%
2024	36,826	+1.06%
Source: Philippine Statistics Authority

Based on 2014 survey, the total population was 33,264, consisting of 17,046 males and 16,218 females. The number of households was 6,653, with an average household size of 4.87 persons and a density of 68/km2. Built-up Area population density at town proper 6,652 along Carline Area is 4,992, Coastal Area is 5,751 and Rural Area is 5,748.

== Economy ==
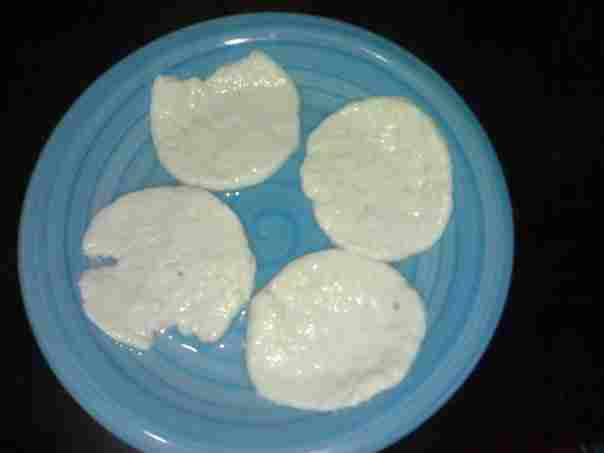
Queseo, native cheese delicacy of Gandara

Poverty incidence of Gandara (%)

Source: Philippine Statistics Authority

The municipality of Gandara is known for its products such as queseo (kesong puti), tablea, tinapa (smoked fish), kalinayan rice, rootcrops and peanuts exported in the entire region of Eastern Visayas and to any point of the Philippine archipelago. Queseo is one of its tourism and livelihood assets.

== Tourism ==
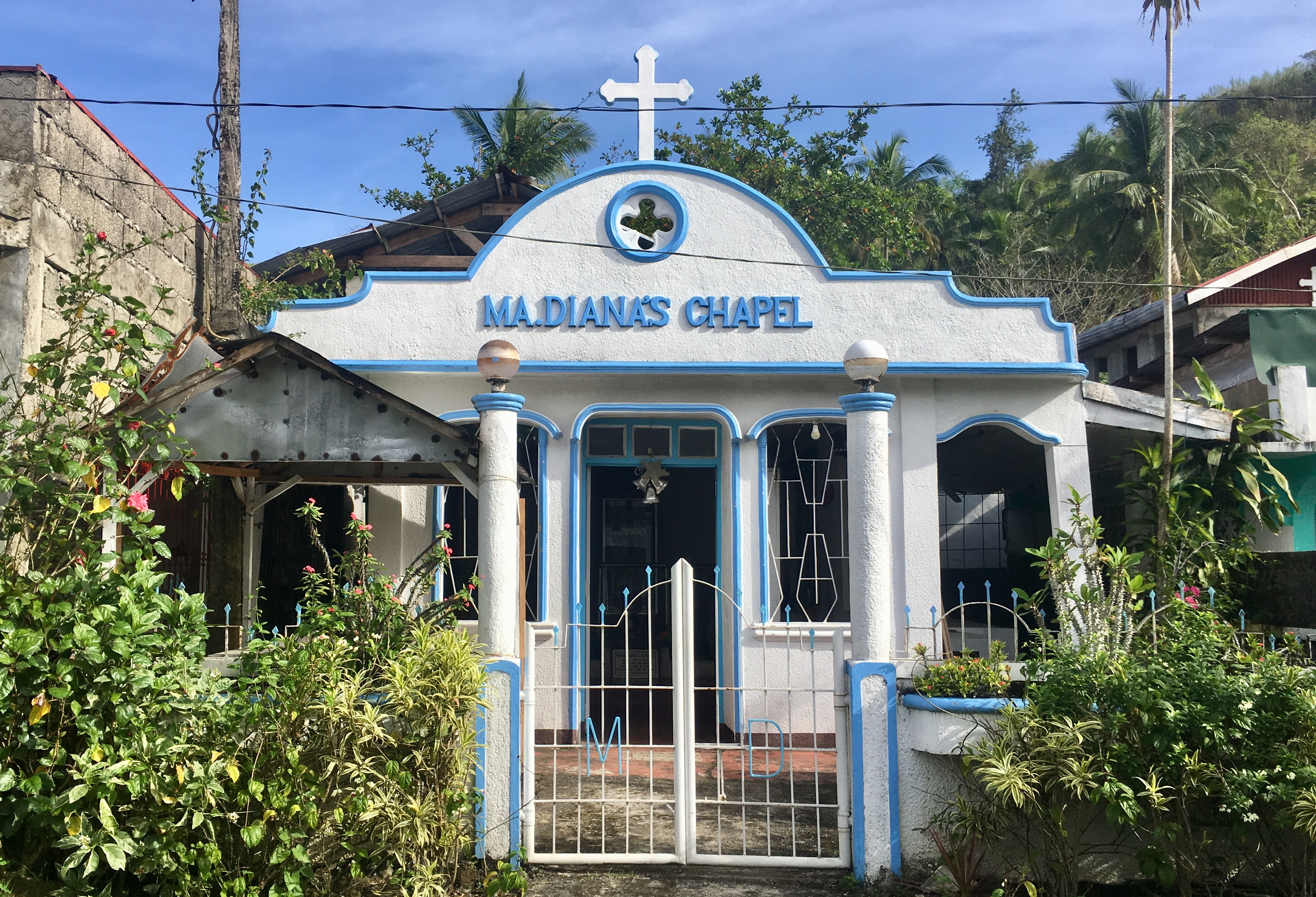
Maria Diana’s Chapel located in the Gandara Public Cemetery

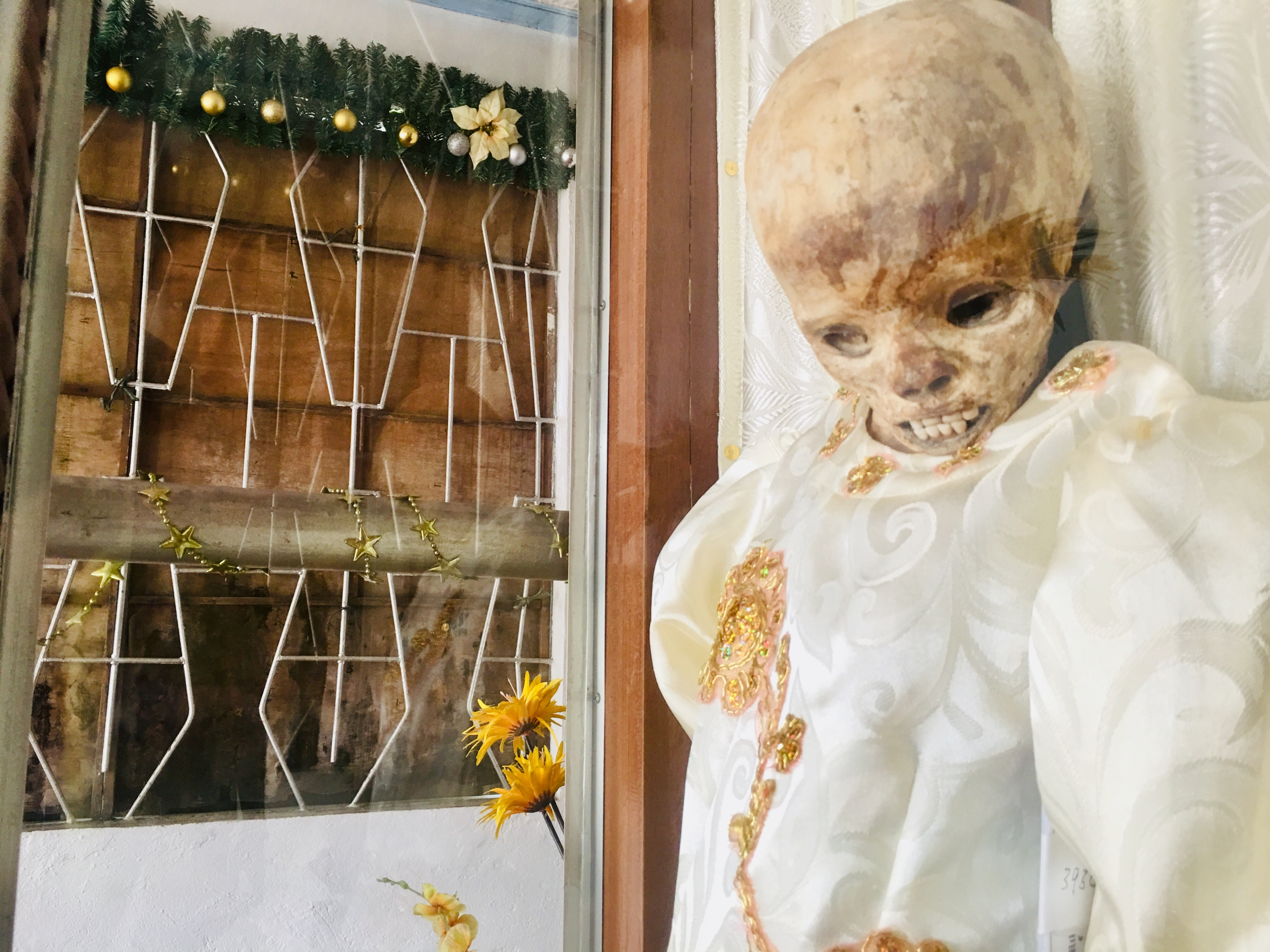
Miraculous cadaver of Maria Diana

Maria Diana’s Chapel
Gandara is the home also of the corpse of Maria Diana Alvarez, believed to be miraculous by the Gandareños.

Karabaw Festival
A festival which pays tribute to the draft animal that helps people till their farms and provides milk for Gandara’s local white cheese delicacy called “Queseo”. The festival itself has proven a lot in terms of creativity and uniqueness. In fact, it has already won 7 times in the Samar Day Celebration observed every August 11 where all municipalities and cities in Samar gather at the provincial capitol in Catbalogan to perform and compete.

Annual Fluvial Parade
The traditional fluvial procession along the river of Gandara held every month of September is a significant and mainstay event of the yearly fiesta celebration.

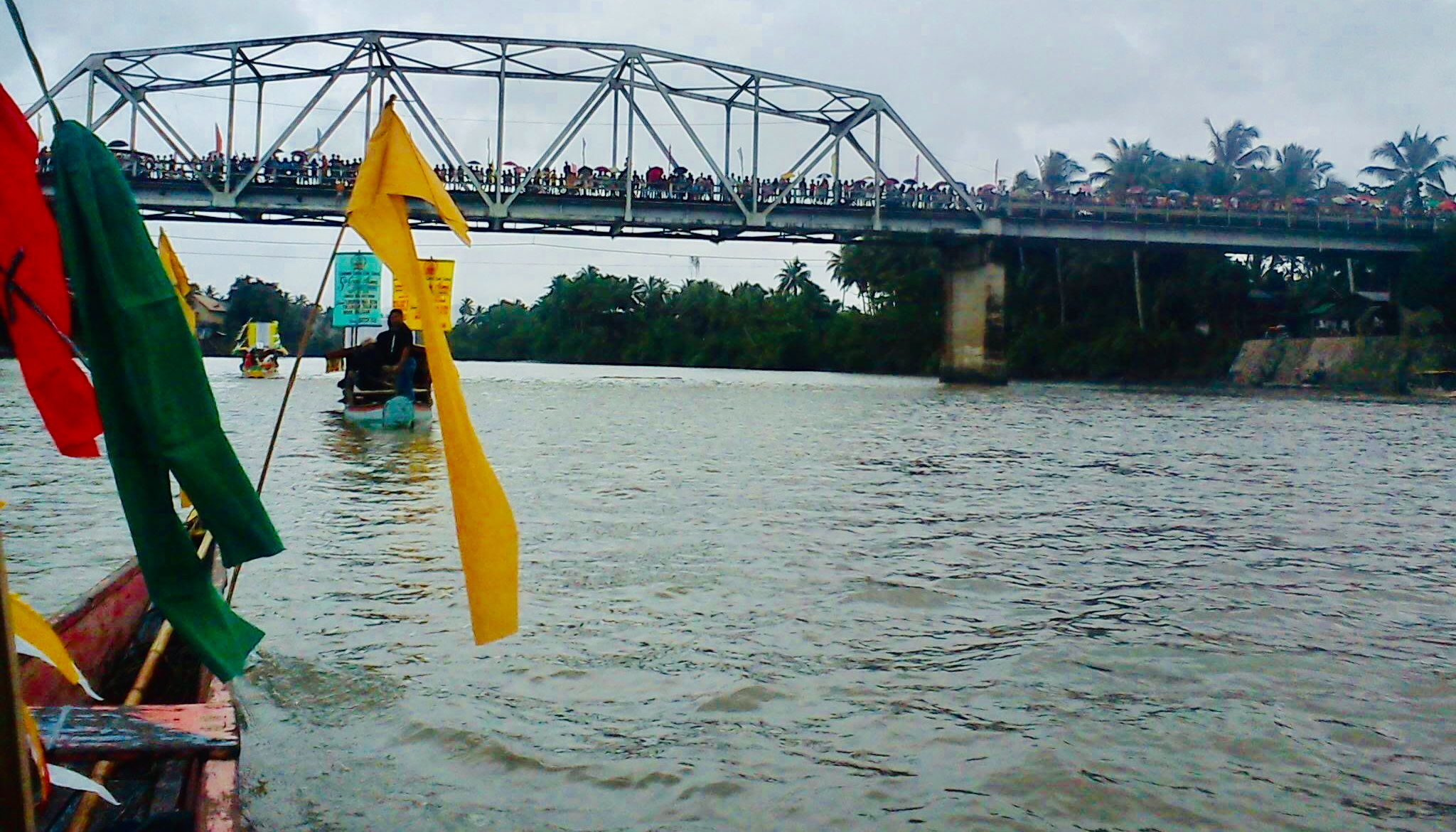
Fluvial procession along the river of Gandara passing under Gandara bridge

Bangahon Church Ruins
The Ruins of Bangahon is a historical landmark near the right fork of Gandara river. It was once a town during the revolutionary period, but was abandoned by the old residents who later found the present town of Gandara. The site was the original homage to St. Michael the Archangel, the patron saint of the townspeople, located in Brgy. Bangahon, Gandara, Samar. The said place of worship was ruined during the Pulajanes-American war. The American used Field Guns destroying the said church. It was noted for its Bangahon Bell (Lingganay). This bell was sequestered by the Americans on September 29, 1901, at Balangiga. The bell of Bangahon church is believed to be one of those Balangiga bells.

San Jose Rapids
The Rapids are geolocated near Matuguinao, actually it is the Gandara River and Matuguinao River (river source) formed by rock formation, the word (Panaog) in local folks.

== Education ==
=== Gandara Central Elementary School ===
Gandara Central Elementary School started with the construction of Gabaldon School Buildings. The Gabaldon School Buildings or simply known as the Gabaldons is a term used to refer to heritage school buildings in the Philippines built during the American Colonial Era. They are noted for the architecture inspired from the bahay kubo and bahay na bato. As of about 2024, there are 2,045 Gabaldon School Buildings throughout the Philippines.

The Gabaldon School Buildings, also referred to as the Gabaldons, originated from Act No. 1801 or the Gabaldon Law, a legislation written by Isauro Gabaldón of the Philippine Assembly in 1907. The law provided for the funding of ₱1 million for the construction of modern public schools across the Philippine Islands from 1908 to 1915.

- Gandara Central School I
- Gandara Central School II
- Miracle Haven Kinder School

=== Secondary education ===
- Saint Michael's High School, Incorporated (SMHSi)

From 1663 to 1768, Bangajon was administered by a priest from the Catbalogan Cabeccera Residencia who had the multiple duties of administering also the Tinago (Tarangnan) and sometimes the Hibatang (now Calbayog) visitas. In 1663, Moro pirates reached the village of Bangajon. After ransacking the village, they burned it. But the Jesuits missionaries were undaunted. They rebuilt the village and built a church made of stone and roofed with zinc and partly with nipa. It measured “26 fathoms (stones) in length wall thickness, 9 fathoms (stones) in width, 4 ½ fathoms (stones) in height” (about 48 meters in length, 16.5 m. in width and 4.5 m. in height). The church was dedicated to St. Michael de Archangel. They also built a convento of the same materials and two parochial schools (one for boys and another for girls) and a casa real of wood.

After the fire in 1876, a tribunal and an escuela were also constructed under the direction of Fr. Geronimo Asenjo. They also continued with the education of the people, especially the children. The older residents of Gandara remember that the first book they used in the school was the Katon Cristiana. Graduation from school was simple. Any pupil who could recite the contents of the whole book from memory was graduated. Then they writer sent to the barrios to teach the Katon Christiana.

In 1901, the town principalia held a session extraordinaria on April 14, 1901 and passed an Act to build a new town and to transfer its location to the sitio of Dumalo-ong (present-day site of Gandara). When peace finally came to Samar in 1902, the people went about the reconstruction of the town and the church. Religious activities were resumed. Gandaranhons celebrated their first fiesta with their new Mayor on September 29, 1903 after years of war.

Franciscan missionaries returned to Gandara in 1910 after the new Diocese of Calbayog was established. Franciscan priests assigned to Gandara from 1910 to 1926 were Fr. Juan Vicente Carmona, O.F.M., Fr. Roman Perez, O.F.M. and Fr. Victoriano Ranera. O.F.M. Early in the sixties, Msgr. Ponciano Figueroa, then parish priest of Gandara, together with the mayor, Mayor Ramon Tan Diaz, established the St. Michael High School, the first and only Catholic school in the town.

- Ramon T. Diaz National High School (RTDNHS) (formerly Ramon T. Diaz Memorial High School / Gandara National High School)
- Piñaplata Integrated School

=== Tertiary Education ===
- Harvardian Vocational School -
