= Vicente I. de Veyra =

Waray-language poet, anthologist and orthographer

- Born: Vicente Ignacio Luangco de Veyra; 1 February 1888; Palo, Leyte, Eastern Visayas, Philippines
- Died: 10 March 1975 (aged 87)
- Other names: Vatchoo, Honey Boy
- Occupations: Poet; anthologist; orthographer; dentist
- Years active: 1910–1975
- Organization: Sanghiran san Binisaya

Vicente Ignacio Luangco de Veyra (February 1, 1888 – March 10, 1975), who also used the pseudonyms Vatchoo and Honey Boy, was a Waray poet, writer, anthologist, orthographer and dentist.

== Life ==
A nephew of the Commonwealth-era politician Jaime C. de Veyra, he was a member of the Sanghiran san Binisaya, an early 20th-century association dedicated to the promotion of Waray culture and the intellectualization of the Waray language and Waray literature. As an anthologist, de Veyra collected stories, riddles, poems and proverbs from all over the province of Leyte, while as an orthographer he compiled orthographic rules for the Waray language.

== Selected poems ==
- "An Naghahablun"
- "Next to Your Mother, Whom Do You Love?" (Sapit ha Im Nanay Hin-o It Im Hinigugma?)
- "Siplati ako, amo na la!"
- "Tuura Iday, Di' Gad Ak' Say"
- "Angeling"
- "Pinili Ku Ikaw Nga Sangkay"
- "Bukad nga tinitipigan"
- "Bis' Malaya, Bis' Mabukbuk"
- "Franca V. Araza"
- "Maamyum Nga Tanaman"
- "Hin Usa Ka Maagahun"
- "Disyimbri Ika 30 Ha 1896" (p. 21)
- "Pagdayig"
- "Huy lider, huy leader"
- "Igawas an Takmag"

== Anthologies and other works ==
- Mga Sanglitanan (1911)
- Hinugpung (1914)
- Mga Ambahan (1922)
- An Pagpanarit (1956)
- Mga Lagda Ha Pagsurat Han Aton Pinulungan
- Mga Dayhuan Han Bisaya (c. 1957, Sacred Heart Press, Tacloban)
- Mga Titiguhon (1957)
- Katapusan Nga Panamilet (1958)
- Abakadahan: madale an pagtutdo ngan masayon an pagaram hin pagbasahan Binisaya (1960)
- "The Leyte-Samar dialect", Leyte-Samar Studies (1967)
- "Foreign words in the Leyte-Samar dialect", Leyte-Samar Studies (1967)
- "Dayhuan (Proverbs)", In Our Heritage column, Leyte-Samar Studies (1967 and 1968)
- "Titiguhon (Riddles)", In Our Heritage column, Leyte-Samar Studies (1967 and 1968)
- "Diwata (Superstitions)", In Our Heritage column, Leyte-Samar Studies (1968)
- Palo: Twice the Capital of Leyte (1971, Your Press, Tacloban)
- "Ortograpiya han Binisaya", Kandabao: Essays on Waray language, literature, and culture (1982)

== Readings ==
- Vicente I. de Veyra – Waray Museum
- Entry on Vicente I. de Veyra in the CCP encyclopedia of Philippine art, Manila: CCP, 1994, p. 585
- Luangco, Gregorio C., "A Study of the Waray poems of Vicente I. de Veyra" (thesis), Divine Word University of Tacloban, 1982
