= N676 highway (Philippines) =

National route in the Eastern Visayas region, Philippines

National Route 676 (N676) is a primary national route in the Eastern Visayas region of the Philippines, that forms part of the Philippine highway network. It starts in Quinapondan, Eastern Samar and crosses the municipalities of Salcedo, Mercedes, and eventually Guiuan before ending in Sulangan. A rough route as far as Salcedo was made in the 19th century, with development ever since. It has had rehabilitation and expansion projects in the 21st century.

== Route description ==
The highway starts from the Quinapondan portion of the Borongan-Guiuan Road in a crossing from roads going to Borongan and Tacloban. The highway ventures southeast, reaching the municipality of Salcedo, Eastern Samar. An auxiliary road then diverts out of the highway before merging in another stretch. After crossing the poblacion of Salcedo, it ventures into Mercedes, Eastern Samar. The highway crosses over the Buyayawon Bridge over a portion of the Leyte Gulf. The highway eventually leads to Guiuan, where it passes by the poblacion and the Guiuan Airport. The road then leads to the Guiuan Port before merging with another stretch, named the Guiuan-Sulangan Road. It crosses a bridge leading to Calicoan Island before reaching Sulangan. There is another bridge leading to Leleboon Island, where more houses from Sulangan are, before ending.

== History ==
In the 19th century, a rough coastal route was made for Borongan as far as Salcedo. As far as 1944, a proper road was made in the sections of Salcedo and Mercedes. A rehabilitation project for the road was done in July 2005 along with other roads in Eastern Samar. In a World Bank Group report dating back to November 13, 1979, a project was made to build a road from Oras, in the northern portion of Eastern Samar, to Guiuan. The Borongan-Guiuan road was then involved in a road project in 2016 over some of the bridges, including the Buyayawon Bridge. The project was funded by foreign aid agency Millennium Challenge Corporation. Another rehabilitation project over the road was planned on February 18, 2025.
