= List of historical markers of the Philippines in Eastern Visayas =

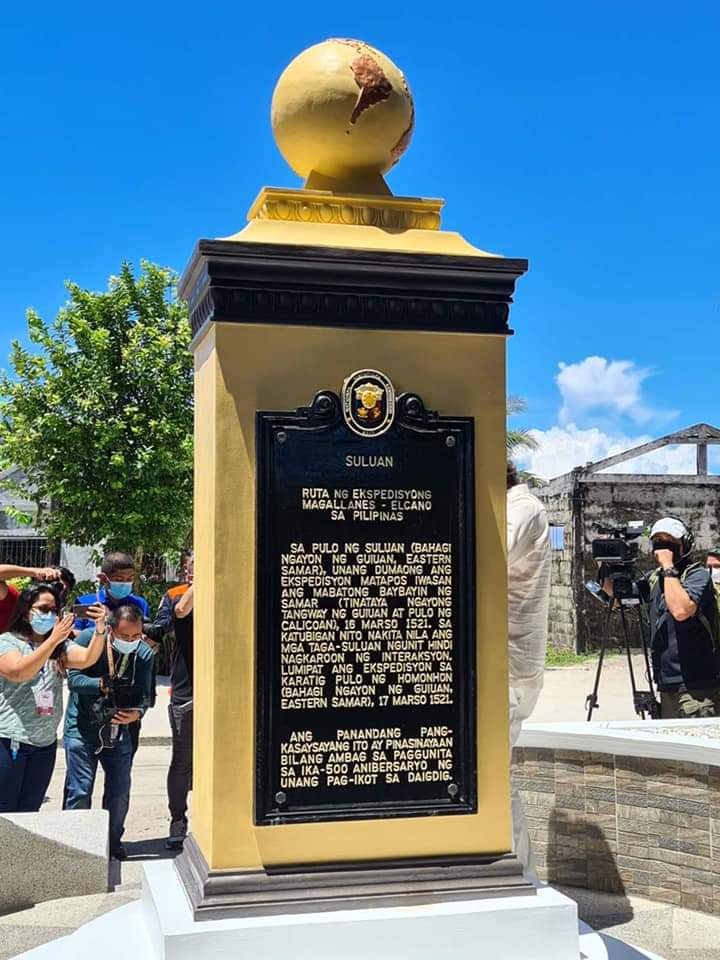
Suluan quincentennial monument and historical marker, unveiled as part of the 2021 Quincentennial Commemorations

This list of historical markers installed by the National Historical Commission of the Philippines (NHCP) in Eastern Visayas (Region VIII) is an annotated list of people, places, or events in the region that have been commemorated by cast-iron plaques issued by the said commission. The plaques themselves are permanent signs installed in publicly visible locations on buildings, monuments, or in special locations.

While many Cultural Properties have historical markers installed, not all places marked with historical markers are designated into one of the particular categories of Cultural Properties.

This article lists 51 markers from the Eastern Visayas Region, including four that are part of the Quincentennial historical markers series, including nine that are part of the Quincentennial historical markers series.

== Biliran ==
This table lists one marker from the province of Biliran.

Marker title	Description	Location	Language	Date issued	Image
Bantayan ng Biliran (Note: Watchtower of Biliran)	Church and watchtower built from 1765 to 1774. Made from coral and stones.	Brgy. San Roque, Biliran	Filipino	September 10, 2008	

== Leyte ==
This table lists 20 markers from the province of Leyte.

Marker title	Description	Location	Language	Date issued	Image
(untitled)	Redoña House used as provisional seat of government of the Philippines.	Tacloban City	English	1959	
Baybay; Ruta ng Ekspedisyong Magallanes–Elcano sa Pilipinas (Note: Baybay: Route of the Magellan–Elcano Expedition in the Philippines)	From the waters of Canigao, the expedition went to the waters of Baybay, April 5, 1521.	Punta Church, Brgy. Punta, Baybay	Filipino	April 5, 2021	
Canigao; Ruta ng Ekspedisyong Magallanes–Elcano sa Pilipinas (Note: Canigao: Route of the Magellan–Elcano Expedition in the Philippines)	Antonio Pigafetta said that they went to the island of Canigao on their way to Cebu.	Canigao Island, Matalom	Filipino	April 5, 2021	
Capitol Building of the Philippines, 1944–1945	Served as the capitol of the Philippines and where Sergio Osmeña was formally installed as president of the Commonwealth.	Leyte Provincial Capitol, Tacloban City	English	1950	
The Cathedral of Palo	First church built by the Jesuits; used as a hospital by American Liberation Forces.	Palo Cathedral, Palo	English	1954	
Church of Tanauan, Leyte	First church built by the Jesuits in 1704. Withstood hurricane and tidal wave of 1897.	Tanauan	English	1949	
Don Vicente Orestes Romualdez y Lopez (1885–1955)	Became a leader of the guerilla forces during the Japanese Occupation.	Tacloban City	Filipino	1985	
Don Vicente Orestes Romualdez y Lopez (1885–1955)	Became a leader of the guerilla forces during the Japanese Occupation.	Daniel Z. Romualdez Memorial Elementary School, Tolosa	Filipino, English	July 1, 1985	
Gatighan; Ruta ng Ekspedisyong Magallanes–Elcano sa Pilipinas (Note: Gatighan: Route of the Magellan–Elcano Expedition in the Philippines)	Antonio Pigafetta noted local animals like bats and birds.	Himokilan Island, Hindang	Filipino	April 5, 2021	
Jaime C. De Vera	Became first Filipino governor of Leyte from 1906 to 1907. Director of the National Language Institute from 1937 to 1941.	Tanauan	Filipino	November 4, 1973	
Japanese Pillbox; Whitebeach, San Jose, Tacloban City	Japanese fortification during WWII. Captured by allies and was used as shelter against Japanese air raids.	Patio Victoria Beach Resort, Tacloban City	English	1979	
Labanan sa Look ng Ormoc (Note: Battle of Ormoc Bay)	Part of the Last Allied operations in Leyte that ended in December 25, 1944.	Ormoc City	Filipino	February 27, 2023	
Leyte Landing	McArthur landing site on October 20, 1944, to drive the Japanese out of the Philippines.	MacArthur Landing Memorial National Park, Palo	English	1949	
Norberto Romualdez; 1875–1941	Became a Supreme Court magistrate and a delegate to the 1934 Constitutional Convention. Site of birthplace.	Ave. Maria cor. Santa Ana Sts., Burauen	Filipino	1975	
Pagdaong sa Dulag, Leyte (Note: Dulag, Leyte Landing)	Site of landing of the US 24th and 10th corps on October 20, 1944.	Dulag	Filipino	October 20, 2008	
Leyte Landing	McArthur landing site on October 20, 1944. He was with President Osmeña and other government officials.	MacArthur Landing Memorial National Park, Palo	Filipino, English	2004	
Provisional Capitol	Building was constructed in 1910. Served as provisional capitol 20–23 October 1944.	Price Mansion (CAP Building), Tacloban City	English	1950	
Simbahan ng Hilongos (Note: Church of Hilongos)	Started as a visita of Ormoc. First evangelization of the Jesuits in 1603.	Hilongos	Filipino	December 22, 1994	
Walter William Marquardt (1878–1962)	Arrived in the Philippines in 1901. Principal of Philippine School of Arts and Trade.	Burauen North Central School, Burauen	Filipino, English	April 5, 1987	
The Convent of Palo	Constructed by the Jesuits in 1596. Served as Leyte provincial capitol from February 1898 to March 1901.	Palo Convent, Palo	English	1954	

== Eastern Samar ==
This table lists 13 markers from the province of Eastern Samar.

Marker title	Description	Location	Language	Date issued	Image
Balangiga Massacre	Site of the bloody massacre of the American forces in the span of six months.	Balangiga	Filipino	September 28, 1982	
Ang Labanan sa Borongan (1899 Himagsikang Pilipino–Amerikano) (Note: The Battle of Borongan (1899 Philippine–American War))	Where revolutionary Filipinos won in Samar under Capt. Ramon Serrano.	City of Borongan	Filipino	November 14, 2012	
Eugenio Daza y Salazar (1870–1954)	Revolutionary general and lawmaker. Became representative of the Third District of Samar on the Philippine First Assembly in 1907.	Real Street, Borongan poblacion	Filipino	1992	
Eugenio Daza y Salazar (1870–1954)	Revolutionary general and lawmaker. Became representative of the Third District of Samar on the Philippine First Assembly in 1907.	Borongan–Guiuan Road, Borongan	Filipino	August 11, 1992	
Homonhon	Where Ferdinand Magellan landed on March 17, 1521, on the feast of Saint Lazarus, which became the namesake of the Philippines.	Homonhon Island, Guiuan		1952	
Homonhon	Place where Magellan first landed on March 17, 1521, and made contact with the natives the next day.	Barangay Pagbabangnan, Homonhon, Guiuan		March 18, 2022	
Homonhon; Ruta ng Ekspedisyong Magallanes–Elcano sa Pilipinas (Note: Homonhon: Route of the Magellan–Elcano Expedition in the Philippines)	Commemorates the 500th anniversary of the landing of the Magellan–Elcano expedition on the island on March 17, 1521.	Homonhon Island, Guiuan	Filipino	March 17, 2021	
Katedral ng Borongan (Note: Cathedral of Borongan)	Original stone church built in 1710. Became a cathedral in 1961.	Borongan	Filipino	September 7, 1998	
Samar; Ruta ng Ekspedisyong Magallanes–Elcano sa Pilipinas (Note: Samar: Route of the Magellan–Elcano Expedition in the Philippines)	Commemorates the 500th anniversary of the arrival of the Magellan–Elcano expedition in the area on March 16, 1521.	Calicoan Island, Guiuan	Filipino, Spanish	March 18, 2021	
Simbahan ng Balangiga (Note: Church of Balangiga)	First built by the Jesuits in the 17th century within a fort. The bell was rung here on September 28, 1901, to signify Filipino uprising against the Americans.	Balangiga	Filipino	April 3, 1993	
Simbahan ng Guiuan (Note: Church of Guiuan)	First built in 1718, declared a National Cultural Treasure in 2001, destroyed by Typhoon Haiyan in 2003, then restored by the National Museum.	Guiuan	Filipino	March 18, 2021	
Suluan; Ruta ng Ekspedisyong Magallanes–Elcano sa Pilipinas (Note: Suluan: Route of the Magellan–Elcano Expedition in the Philippines)	Commemorates the 500th anniversary of the arrival of the Magellan–Elcano expedition in the area on March 16, 1521.	Suluan Island, Guiuan	Filipino	March 16, 2021	
United Nations Evacuation Center; Tubabao, Guiuan, Silangang Samar (Note: United Nations Evacuation Center: Tubabao, Guiuan, Eastern Samar)	Where over 6,000 Russian refugees sought asylum in the 1950s. They were accepted by President Elpidio Quirino.	Tubabao Island, Guiuan	Filipino	November 16, 2016	

== Northern Samar ==
This table lists eight markers from the province of Northern Samar.

Marker title	Description	Location	Language	Date issued	Image
Agustin Sumuroy	Rebel leader against the Spaniards. Rebelled against forced labor and abuses against the natives.	Palapag	Filipino		
Daungang Galyon ng Palapag, Samar (Note: Galleon Port of Palapag, Samar)	One of the official ports of galleons from Mexico before departing for Cavite.	Palapag	Filipino	August 10, 2015	
Padre Francisco Ignacio Alcina, S.J. (1610–1674)	Spanish Jesuit missionary. Published an extensive history of the Visayas.	Palapag	Filipino	July 30, 2024	
Labanan sa Catubig (Note: Battle of Catubig)	One of the successful battles won by Filipinos during the Philippine–American War.	Catubig	Filipino	2007	
Lumang Simbahan ng Palapag (Note: Old Church of Palapag)	Ruins of the church built by the Jesuits. Established in 1605. Where the revolt of Sumuroy started.	Palapag	Filipino	March 16, 2010	
Parola ng Capul (Note: Capul Lighthouse)	Built from 1893 to 1896. Serves as a guide for ships traversing the San Bernardino Strait.	Capul Island Lighthouse	Filipino	October 24, 2018	
Simbahan ng Capul (Note: Church of Capul)	Church first built by the Jesuits as a mission in 1856. Built under the patronage of Ignatius of Loyola.	Capul	Filipino	August 5, 2011	
University of Eastern Philippines	Formerly known as the Catarman Farm School.	Catarman	Filipino	September 12, 2014	

== Samar ==
This table lists two markers from the province of Samar.

Marker title	Description	Location	Language	Date issued	Image
Katedral ng Calbayog (Note: Cathedral of Calbayog)	Established by the Jesuits in 1599 as a parish of Capul. Current structure was constructed in 1840.	Calbayog Church, Calbayog City	Filipino	November 25, 2018	
Simbahan ng Basey (Note: Church of Basey)	Old Jesuit parish in 1591. Transferred to the Augustinians in 1768.	Basey Church facade, Basey	Filipino	September 29, 1987	

== Southern Leyte ==
This table lists seven markers from the province of Southern Leyte.

Marker title	Description	Location	Language	Date issued	Image
First Mass in the Philippines	First mass celebrated on Easter Sunday March 31, 1521 by Magellan and his men.	Limasawa	English	1950	
First Mass in the Philippines	First mass celebrated on Easter Sunday March 31, 1521 by Magellan and his men. (Replica of the marker at Limasawa.)	Padre Burgos	English	March 31, 1951	
Hinunangan; Ruta ng Ekspedisyong Magallanes–Elcano sa Pilipinas (Note: Hinunangan: Route of the Magellan–Elcano Expedition in the Philippines)	After getting necessities from Homonhon, the expedition went to Hinunangan, March 25, 1521.	Hinunangan	Filipino	March 25, 2021	
Katedral ng Maasin (Note: Cathedral of Maasin)	Built by the Jesuits in 1700. Became a cathedral on August 14, 1968, as seat of the Diocese of Maasin.	Maasin City	Filipino	1983	
Leyte; Ruta ng Ekspedisyong Magallanes–Elcano sa Pilipinas (Note: Leyte: Route of the Magellan–Elcano Expedition in the Philippines)	From Mazaua, the expedition went northwards to Leyte.	Brgy. Combado, Maasin	Filipino	April 4, 2021	
Limasawa (Mazaua); Ruta ng Ekspedisyong Magallanes–Elcano sa Pilipinas (Note: Limasawa (Mazaua): Route of the Magellan–Elcano Expedition in the Philippines)	Where the Magellan expedition realized that they have circled the world as Rajah Colambu and Enrique de Malacca have understood each other through the Malay language.	Limasawa	Filipino	March 31, 2021	
Oppus Ancestral House	Declared a Heritage House on 6 October 2005.	Southern Leyte Provincial Library & Information Center, Agbao, R. Kangleon St., Maasin City	English	April 17, 2018	

== See also ==
- List of Cultural Properties of the Philippines in Eastern Visayas

== Bibliography ==
- National Historical Institute (1994). Historical Markers: Regions V-XIII. National Historical Institute.
- National Historical Institute (2008). Historical Markers (1992 - 2006). National Historical Institute.
- A list of sites and structures with historical markers, as of 16 January 2012
- A list of institutions with historical markers, as of 16 January 2012
