= List of Cultural Properties of the Philippines in Eastern Visayas =

This list contains an overview of the government recognized Cultural Properties of the Philippines in Eastern Visayas. The list is based on the official lists provided by the National Commission on Culture and the Arts, National Historical Commission of the Philippines and the National Museum of the Philippines.

| Cultural Property wmph identifier (Note: wmph is an internal identifier used by Wikimedia Philippines to identify the monument. This is not an official identifier, and only shown temporarily in the templates until the government creates an updated complete list.) | Site name | Description | Province | City or municipality | Address | Coordinates | Image |
|---|---|---|---|---|---|---|---|
| PH-08-0001 | Biliran Watchtower | | Biliran | Biliran | | | Upload file |
| PH-08-0002 | Balangiga Church | | Eastern Samar | Balangiga | | 11°06′34″N 125°23′07″E | Upload file |
| PH-08-0003 | Guiuan Church | | Eastern Samar | Guiuan | | 11°01′53″N 125°43′22″E | Upload file |
| PH-08-0004 | MacArthur Landing Memorial | | Leyte | Palo | | 11°10′20″N 125°00′44″E | More images |
| PH-08-0005 | Dulag Landing Site | | Leyte | Dulag | | | Upload file |
| PH-08-0006 | Palo Cathedral | | Leyte | Palo | | 11°09′34″N 124°59′29″E | Upload file |
| PH-08-0007 | Tanauan Church | | Leyte | Tanauan | | 11°06′46″N 125°01′03″E | Upload file |
| PH-08-0008 | Capul Church | | Northern Samar | Capul | | | Upload file |
| PH-08-0009 | Old Palapag Church | | Northern Samar | Palapag | | | Upload file |
| PH-08-0010 | Basey Church | | Samar | Basey | | 11°16′51″N 125°04′12″E | Upload file |
| PH-08-0011 | Limasawa Shrine | | Southern Leyte | Limasawa | | | Upload Photo |
| PH-08-0012 | Maasin Church | | Southern Leyte | Maasin | | | Upload file |
| PH-08-0013 | Oppus Ancestral House/Southern Leyte Provincial Library | | Southern Leyte | Maasin | | | Upload file |

== See also ==
- List of historical markers of the Philippines in Eastern Visayas
