= Canigao =

Canigao may refer to:

- Canigao Island, an islet located in the Philippines, in the municipality of Matalom, Leyte
- Canigao Channel, a body of water in the Philippines that connects the Bohol Sea with the Camotes Sea and separates the island of Bohol from the island of Leyte
