= Precioso Cantillas =

Filipino Catholic prelate (born 1953)

The Most Reverend Precioso Cantillas SDB, DD
- Bishop of Maasin
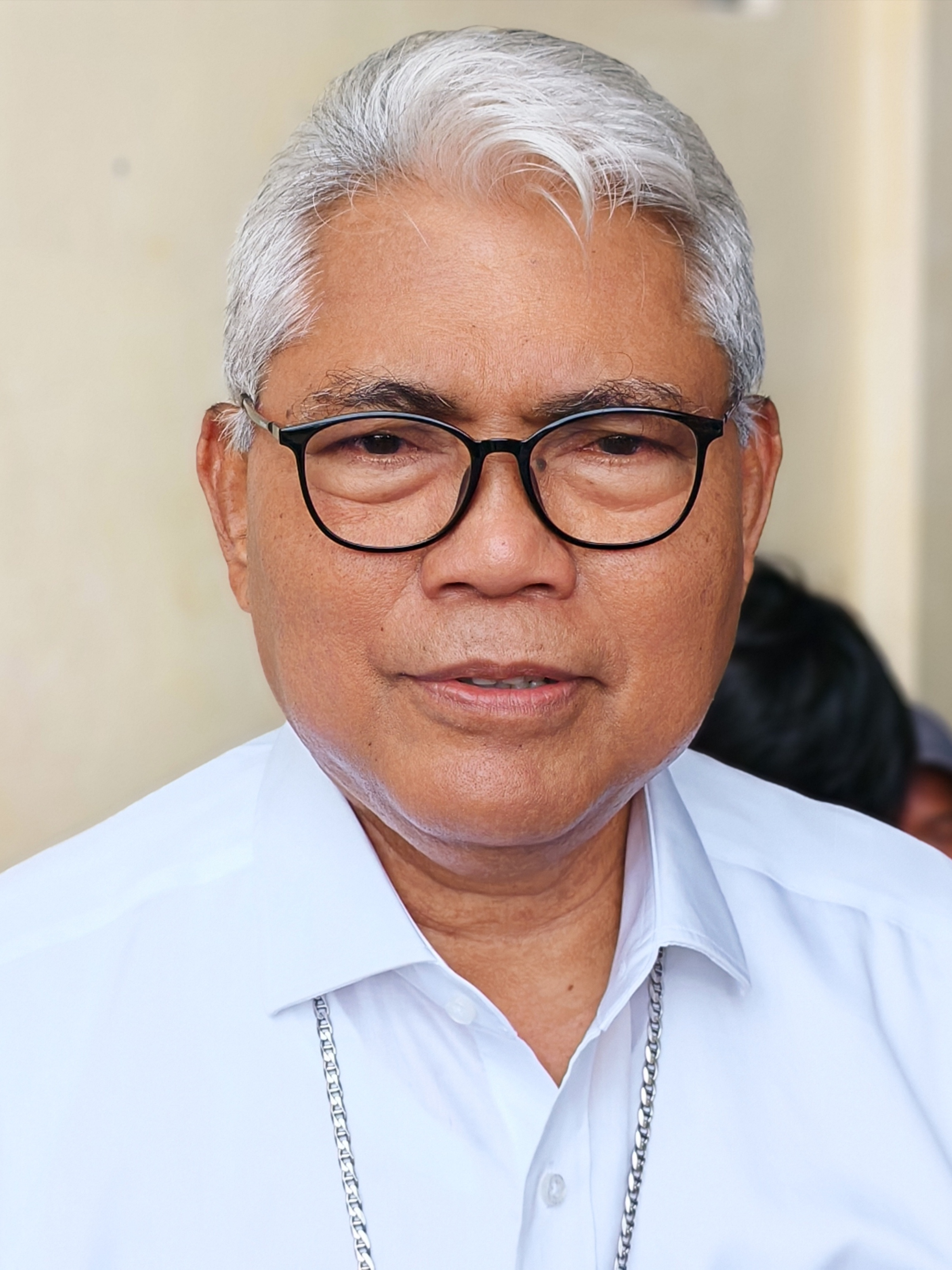
- Cantillas in 2026
- Church: Catholic
- Province: Cebu
- Diocese: Maasin
- Appointed: January 20, 1998
- Installed: March 11, 1998
- Predecessor: Vicente Ataviado
- Previous post: Auxiliary Bishop of Cebu (1995‍–‍1998)

Orders
- Ordination: December 7, 1979
- Consecration: July 12, 1995 by Ricardo Jamin Vidal

Personal details
- Born: July 3, 1953 (age 73) Langtad, Naga, Cebu, Philippines
- Residence: Maasin, Southern Leyte, Philippines
- Motto: Cantabo canticum novum (Latin for 'I will sing a new song')

Ordination history
History
Priestly ordination
- Date: December 7, 1979
- Place: Santo Domingo Church, Quezon City
Episcopal consecration
- Principal consecrator: Ricardo Vidal
- Co-consecrators: Emilio Bataclan; Leo M. Drona
- Date: July 12, 1995
- Place: Cebu Metropolitan Cathedral
- Styles
- Reference style: His Excellency; The Most Reverend
- Spoken style: Your Excellency
- Religious style: Bishop

Precioso Dacalos Cantillas, SDB, D.D. (born July 3, 1953) is a Filipino prelate of the Catholic Church who has been serving as the bishop of the Diocese of Maasin since 1998. Prior to that, he was an auxiliary bishop of Cebu from 1995 to 1998. He is a member of the Salesians of Don Bosco.

== Early life and education ==
Cantillas was born on July 3, 1953, in Langtad, Naga, Cebu, Philippines. He attended Langtad Elementary School and later studied at Don Bosco Technical High School in Cebu City from 1965 to 1969. He pursued higher education at Don Bosco Seminary College in Canlubang, Laguna, earning a Bachelor of Science in Industrial Education between 1969 and 1974.

For his theological studies, he attended the University of Santo Tomas in Manila from 1976 to 1980, obtaining a Bachelor of Science in Sacred Theology. He later pursued further studies at the Technological University of the Philippines, where he earned a Master's in Industrial Education from 1980 to 1982.

== Priesthood ==
Cantillas was ordained a priest for the Salesians of Don Bosco on December 7, 1979, at Santo Domingo Church in Quezon City. His early assignments included serving as a training director and machine shop supervisor at Don Bosco Seminary College from 1974 to 1976. He later became Dean and Technical Director at Don Bosco Seminary College in Laguna from 1980 to 1983.

From 1983 to 1988, he was Dean of Don Bosco Technical College in Mandaluyong City, where he was later appointed Vice-Rector and Director of the Industrial Technician Center from 1985 to 1990. He also served as Executive Vice President of the Philippine Association of Private Technical Institutions from 1988 to 1991 and was a member of the National Science Teaching Instrumentation Center.

His ministry extended beyond academic roles, as he also served as Provincial Councilor for Don Bosco Philippines Province from 1983 to 1992 and became editorial director of the Blue Collar Magazine under Don Bosco Publications from 1988 to 1995. In 1991, he was appointed Rector of Don Bosco Technical College in Mandaluyong City, a position he held until 1992. From 1992 to 1995, he was the Rector of Don Bosco Technical High School in Punta Princesa, Cebu City.

== Episcopal ministry ==
On May 31, 1995, Pope John Paul II appointed Cantillas as Auxiliary Bishop of Cebu and Titular Bishop of Vicus Caesaris. He was consecrated on July 12, 1995, at the Cebu Metropolitan Cathedral, with Cardinal Ricardo Jamin Vidal serving as the principal consecrator.

On January 20, 1998, he was appointed the second bishop of the Maasin. He was installed on March 11, 1998.

On October 29, 2005, Pope Benedict XVI appointed Cantillas as one of the members of Pontifical Council for the Pastoral Care of Migrants and Itinerant People.

Cantillas was appointed a board member of the Technical Education and Skills Development Authority (TESDA) in 1998.

== Advocacy and contributions ==
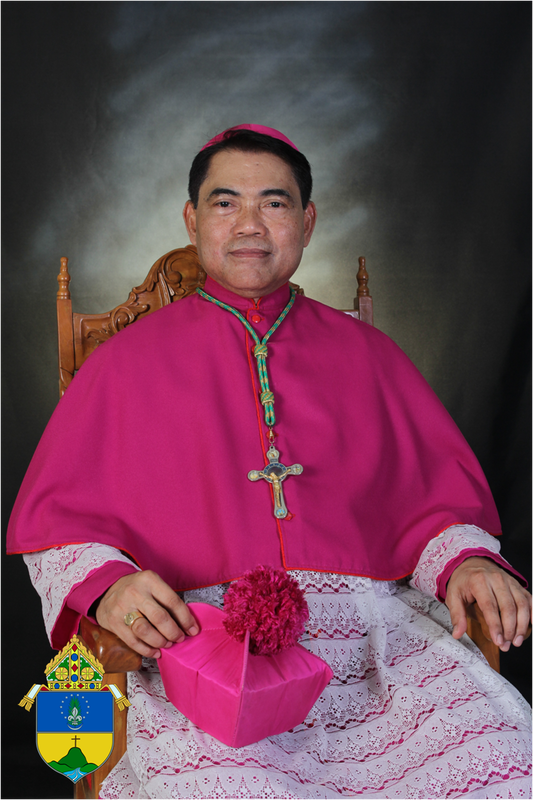
Official Portrait of Bishop Precioso Cantillas

Under Bishop Cantillas' leadership, Maasin Cathedral was formally elevated to a national shrine on August 14, 2023, recognizing its historical and spiritual significance. He also led the Diocese of Maasin in becoming the world's first to fully solar-power all its parishes, aligning with Pope Francis' encyclical Laudato Si'. The initiative significantly cut electricity costs and earned Vatican recognition as a model for sustainable Church practices.

As part of the commemoration of 500 Years of Christianity in the Philippines, Bishop Cantillas led a solemn mass on Limasawa Island, marking the site of the First Mass in the Philippines and reaffirming its significance in the nation's Catholic heritage.

Within the Catholic Bishops' Conference of the Philippines, he served as Chairman of the Commission on Migrants from 2005 to 2013. He also served as chairman of the Commission on Bioethics from 2021 to 2023.

== See also ==
- Diocese of Maasin
- Salesians of Don Bosco

Catholic Church titles
Preceded by Vicente Ataviado	Bishop of Maasin; March 11, 1998 – present	Incumbent
Preceded by Manuel Edmilson da Cruz	— TITULAR — Titular Bishop of Vicus Caesaris; July 12, 1995 – January 20, 1998	Succeeded by Mário Pasqualotto
