= Don Bosco Technical College–Cebu =

Roman Catholic college in Cebu City, Philippines

Don Bosco Technical College — Cebu
- Logo of DBTC-Cebu as of 2022
- Former names: Boys' Town Cebu (1954-1960); Don Bosco Technical High School (1960-1994); Don Bosco Technical Center (1994-); Don Bosco Technology Center (-2016)
- Motto: Ardua Non Timeo (Latin)
- Motto in English: Fear No Hardships
- Type: Private Catholic Salesian Non-profit coeducational basic and higher education institution
- Established: March 15, 1954; 72 years ago
- Founders: Rev. Fr. Attilio Boscariol, SDB; Salesians of Don Bosco
- Accreditation: PAASCU
- Religious affiliation: Roman Catholic (Salesian)
- President: Rev. Fr. Randolph A. Figuracion, SDB
- Vice-president: Rev. Fr. Adriano A. Satura, SDB, CPA (VP Administration); Rev. Fr. Rooney John G. Undar, SDB, EdD (VP Academic Affairs); Rev. Fr. Antonio B. Velarde, SDB (VP Pastoral Programs); Bro. Silvestre B. Cresencio, SDB, MSEE, REE (VP Technical Programs)
- Principal: Rev. Fr. Rooney John G. Undar, SDB, EdD
- Dean: Rev. Fr. Rooney John G. Undar, SDB, EdD
- Faculty: 128
- Location: Cebu City, Cebu, Philippines; 10°17′52″N 123°51′48″E
- Campus: Pleasant Homes Subdivision, Brgy. Punta Princesa, Cebu City, Philippines
- Colors: Blue White
- Sporting affiliations: CESAFI; CEAP-CEPA
- Mascot: Grey Wolf (name: Grigio)
- Website: dbtc-cebu.edu.ph
- Location in the Visayas Location in the Philippines

Don Bosco Technical College–Cebu, also abbreviated as DBTC-Cebu, is a private Catholic vocational basic and higher education institution in Cebu City managed by the Philippines South Province (FIS) of the Salesians of Don Bosco and forms part of the worldwide network of educational institutions inspired by St. John Bosco. The institution traces its origins to Boys’ Town Cebu, which was established in 1954 as a residential and educational center for poor and abandoned boys. The basic education department (except Kinder to Grade 3 as of S.Y. 2026-2027) accepts male students only except the Senior High School which is coeducational, making it one of the very few schools open only to male. The College and TVET departments are also coeducational.

The school offers programs in basic education, technical-vocational training, and higher education. Throughout its history, it has emphasized technical and skills-based education alongside academic instruction and Salesian formation.

Today, DBTC-Cebu continues to provide educational programs in fields such as engineering technology, information technology, electronics, automotive technology, and other technical disciplines. It remains one of the educational institutions operated by the Salesians of Don Bosco in the Philippines, serving students from the basic education and tertiary levels.

A namesake and sister school exists in Mandaluyong.

== History ==
In 1954, the Salesians of Don Bosco, under the leadership of Fr. Carlo Braga, SDB, extended their mission to Cebu. On March 3 of that year, Fr. Attilio Boscariol, SDB arrived in Cebu and, together with the Salesian community, established a home near the Cebu Cathedral. It was originally established as a center for out-of-school youth by Italian Salesian missionaries in 1954 and later developed into a technical school.

As the mission expanded, the institution transferred in 1955 to Punta Princesa on a generous parcel of land donated by renowned Cebuano philanthropist Don Ramon Aboitiz. This move provided the space needed to develop a more comprehensive educational and residential program for the youth entrusted to its care.

In 1960, the government formally recognized the institution as Don Bosco Technical High School, affirming its commitment to technical and vocational education. Despite its official designation, it remained known throughout Cebu as Boys’ Town, a name that reflected its enduring mission of service and compassion.

Driven by a broader vision of educational excellence and technological advancement, the institution adopted the name Don Bosco Technology Center in 1994 following the establishment of its College Department. This milestone signified its growth into a more comprehensive educational institution, offering opportunities for higher learning while remaining faithful to the Salesian tradition.

The school assumed its present name, Don Bosco Technical College – Cebu (DBTC-Cebu), in 2017. Today, it stands as a leading Salesian educational institution in the region, forming young people through academic excellence, technical competence, Christian values, and a commitment to becoming responsible citizens and good Christians in the spirit of Don Bosco.

== Educational programs ==
DBTC provides four programs for its students: Academic Curriculum, Technical Curriculum, Pastoral Programs and Athletic Programs. Students receive technical training in mechanical, electrical, civil, and computer technologies. Pastoral programs include integration of Catholic instruction, celebration of the sacraments and the Salesian Youth Movement in the school. The school is passionate for sports, with specialized training in basketball, football, volleyball, and badminton.

DBTC offers bachelor programs in Mechanical Engineering, Information Technology, and Technical-Vocational Teacher Education. Its satellite campus in Don Bosco Formation Center also offers Bachelor of Arts in Religious Education and Pastoral Communications.

== Response to COVID-19 pandemic of 2020 ==
The school shifted to distance, modular, and online learning at the advent of the COVID-19 pandemic. It activated its distance learning program called BUILD - "Bosconians Under Independent Learning and Development". It uses the platforms of G Suite for Education and Microsoft 365 for online learning. Classes are held through video conferences in Google Meet and Microsoft Teams while modules for distance learning are hosted in Moodle.

== Administration ==
The school is administered by the Salesians of Don Bosco (FIS) by a team of Salesians composed of the following priests and brothers and their corresponding offices:

Name	Office
Very Rev. Fr. Amelito Narciso D. Racelis, SDB, SLL	• Salesians FIS Provincial Superior • Chairman of the Board of Trustees
Rev. Fr. Randolph A. Figuracion, SDB	• Rector • President
Rev. Fr. Adriano A. Satura, SDB, CPA	• Vice Rector • Vice President for Administration and Finance
Rev. Fr. Rooney John G. Undar, SDB, EdD	• Vice President for Academic Programs • College Dean • Basic Education Department Principal
Bro. Silvestre B. Crescencio, SDB, MSEE, REE	• Vice President for Technical Programs • Technical Vocational Education Training Director
Rev. Fr. Antonio B. Velarde, SDB	• Vice President for Pastoral Animation • College Pastoral Animator •
Rev. Fr. Medelino R. Borgueta, SDB, DMD	• Community Pastoral Animator • Boarding House Assistant • Confessor
Rev. Fr. Fidel Thachil, SDB	• Tertiary Instructor • Boarding House In-Charge
Bro. George Vincent B. Celis, SDB	• Sports Development In-Charge
Rev. Fr. Genaro S. Gegantoni, SDB	• Resident Priest • Confessor
Rev. Fr. Daniel Elemia, SDB	• Resident Priest • Confessor
Rev. Fr. Leonard R. McManus, SDB	• Resident Priest • Confessor

== Past Rectors and Presidents ==
Throughout the years, DBTC-Cebu have had 17 administrations of rectors. They are the following:

#	Name	Tenure as Rector	Tenure as President
-	Rev. Fr. Attilio Boscariol, SDB	1954-1955	-
1	Rev. Fr. John Peter Clifford, SDB	1955-1964	-
2	Rev. Fr. Luigi Ricciarelli, SDB	1964-1967	-
3	Rev. Fr. William Balocco, SDB	1967-1969	-
4	Rev. Fr. Pietro Zago, SDB	1969-1973	-
5	Rev. Fr. Edgardo Espiritu, SDB	1973-1976	-
6	Rev. Fr. Genaro S. Gegantoni, SDB	1976-1982	-
7	Rev. Fr. Pietro Zago, SDB	1982-1988	-
8	Most Rev. Patricio A. Buzon, SDB, DD	1988-1992	-
9	Most Rev. Precioso D. Cantillas, SDB, DD	1992-1995	-
10	Rev. Fr. Daniel P. Elemia, SDB	1995-1997	-
11	Most Rev. Patricio A. Buzon, SDB, DD	1997-1998	-
12	Rev. Fr. Genaro S. Gegantoni, SDB	1998-2001	-
13	Rev. Fr. Ronald Guiao, SDB	2001-2010	-
14	Rev. Fr. Honesto G. Geronimo, Jr., SDB	2010-2019	2017-2019
15	Rev. Fr. Fidel Ma. D. Orendain, SDB, PhD	2019-2021	2019-2021
16	Rev. Fr. Jerome Mario C. Dublois, SDB	2021-2022	2021-2022
17	Rev. Fr. Randolph A. Figuracion, SDB	2022-present	2022-present

== PAASCU accreditation ==
The school's Basic Education Department is a level 2 accredited school by the PAASCU awarded in 2023.

== See also ==
- Salesians of Don Bosco
- Don Bosco Technical College (Mandaluyong)
