= Gaspar Ignacio de Guevara =

18th-century Roman Catholic priest from the Philippines

- Province: Biliran
- Installed: 1765
- Term ended: 1774

Personal details
- Born: Samar, Philippines
- Died: 1774 Biliran, Philippines
- Denomination: Roman Catholic
- Profession: Priest

Gaspar Ignacio de Guevara was a Filipino Catholic priest from Samar who was appointed as the curate of Juan Nepomuceno Church in Biliran in 1765. He was known for breaking away from the institutional Roman Catholic church and leading the Biliran religious revolt from 1765 until his death in 1774.

== Early life ==
Ignacio was born in Paranas, Samar. His surname, Ignacio, may have been given by the Jesuits as a tribute to their founder, Ignatius of Loyola. It is likely that the Jesuits recommended him for priesthood studies in Cebu. Ignacio was appointed as the curate of Juan Nepomuceno Church in Biliran in 1765.

== Biliran religious revolt ==
The Jesuits were expelled from the Philippines and replaced by the Augustinians in Leyte and by the Franciscans in Samar. Ignacio opposed the expulsion and expressed his dissent by leading a religious revolt in Biliran from 1765 to 1774

As part of the revolt, Ignacio established a new poblacion or town on a hilltop in Biliran, where he created a sanctuary to promote his religious doctrines. Moreover, he enthroned himself in the "chair of Peter" and styled himself as the "first of the priests of the world. He also restored the pre-colonial belief on women babaylans as religious and prayer leaders.

Ignacio was captured by Moro raiders and was drowned near Tagasipol Islet in Biliran in 1774. The religious revolt in Biliran ended with Ignacio's death.

== Legacy ==
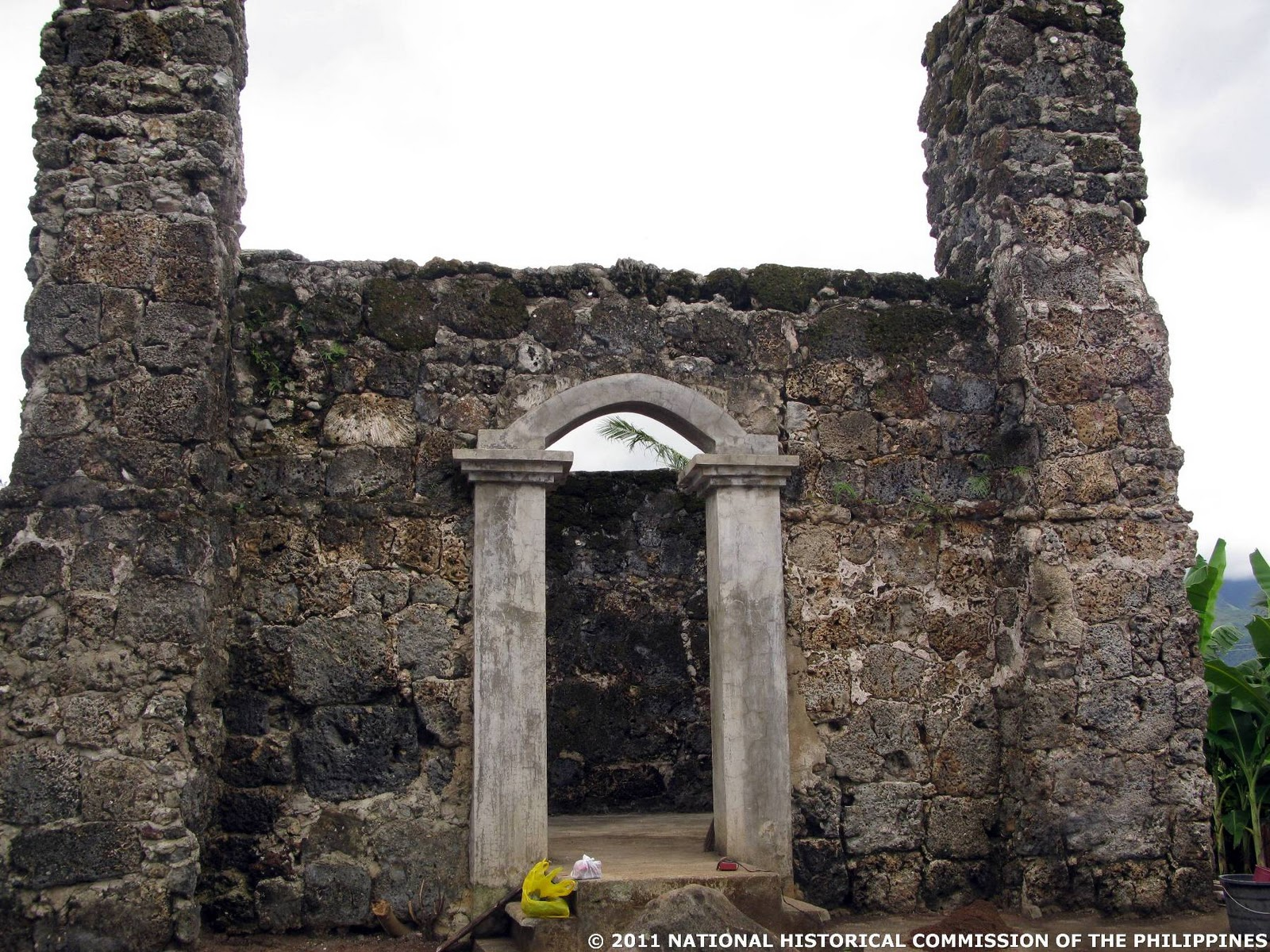
Ruins of Biliran Watchtower

Ignacio's legacy allowed women to take on a dominant role as worship leaders in novena prayers for the dead and related religious rituals. His experiment in communal religion also inspired the messianic movement called dios-dios, which challenged the Spanish and American colonial rules.

In 2008, the National Historical Institute, now the National Historical Commission of the Philippines, installed a historical marker on the ruins of Biliran Watchtower. Believed to be built under the initiative of Ignacio, the watchtower was used to watch Biliran's coast for Moro raiders. It was built in 1765 and destroyed by fire in 1774.
