= Price Mansion =

Historic house in Philippines

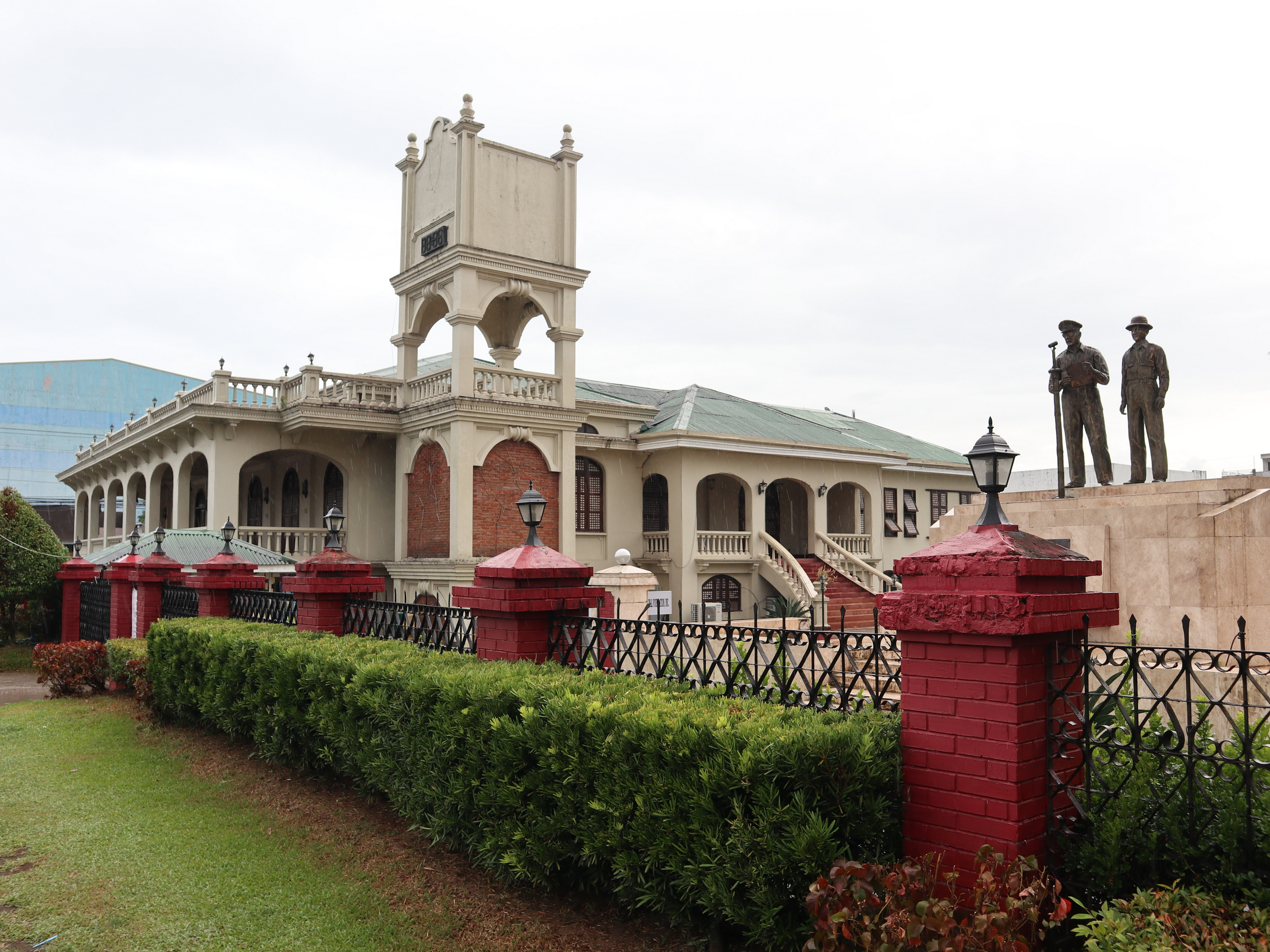
- Interactive map of the Price Mansion area

General information
- Location: Tacloban, Philippines
- Coordinates: 11°14′38.2″N 125°00′15.1″E
- Named for: Walter Scott Price
- Completed: 1910
- Owner: Romualdez family

The Price Mansion is a historic house in Tacloban, Philippines.

== History ==
The Price Mansion was built in 1910 by Walter Scott Price, an American from Philadelphia. He was a United States Army engineer who was assigned in the Philippines for the Spanish–American War. He married Cavite native Simeona Custodio Kalingag, and after the war they migrated to Leyte. Price established several businesses in Tacloban, providing jobs to its residents and was fondly remembered as the "King of Tacloban". During the Japanese occupation of the Philippines of World War II, Price was interned at the UST camp in Manila. He was freed by General Douglas MacArthur's forces but died in 1945 shortly after his release.

MacArthur also used the mansion as a headquarters after his landing in Leyte. Japanese forces bombed the Price Mansion on October 20, 1944, puncturing a hole on the roof above MacArthur's room. The hole is still preserved today.

The College Assurance Plan (CAP) would later acquire the house. As of 2019, the building is owned by the Romualdez family.

== Architecture and design ==
The Price Mansion was originally built as a 12-room building, a room each for each children of Walter Scott Price. His hard-earned wealth allowed Walter to build the 12-room Price Mansion with one room for each of his 12 children. On the first floor, he provided a huge space for the overnight stay of his employees.
