= Diocese of Maasin =

Latin Catholic diocese in the Philippines

Diocese of Maasin Dioecesis Maasinensis Diyosesis sa Maasin Diócesis de Maasin

Catholic
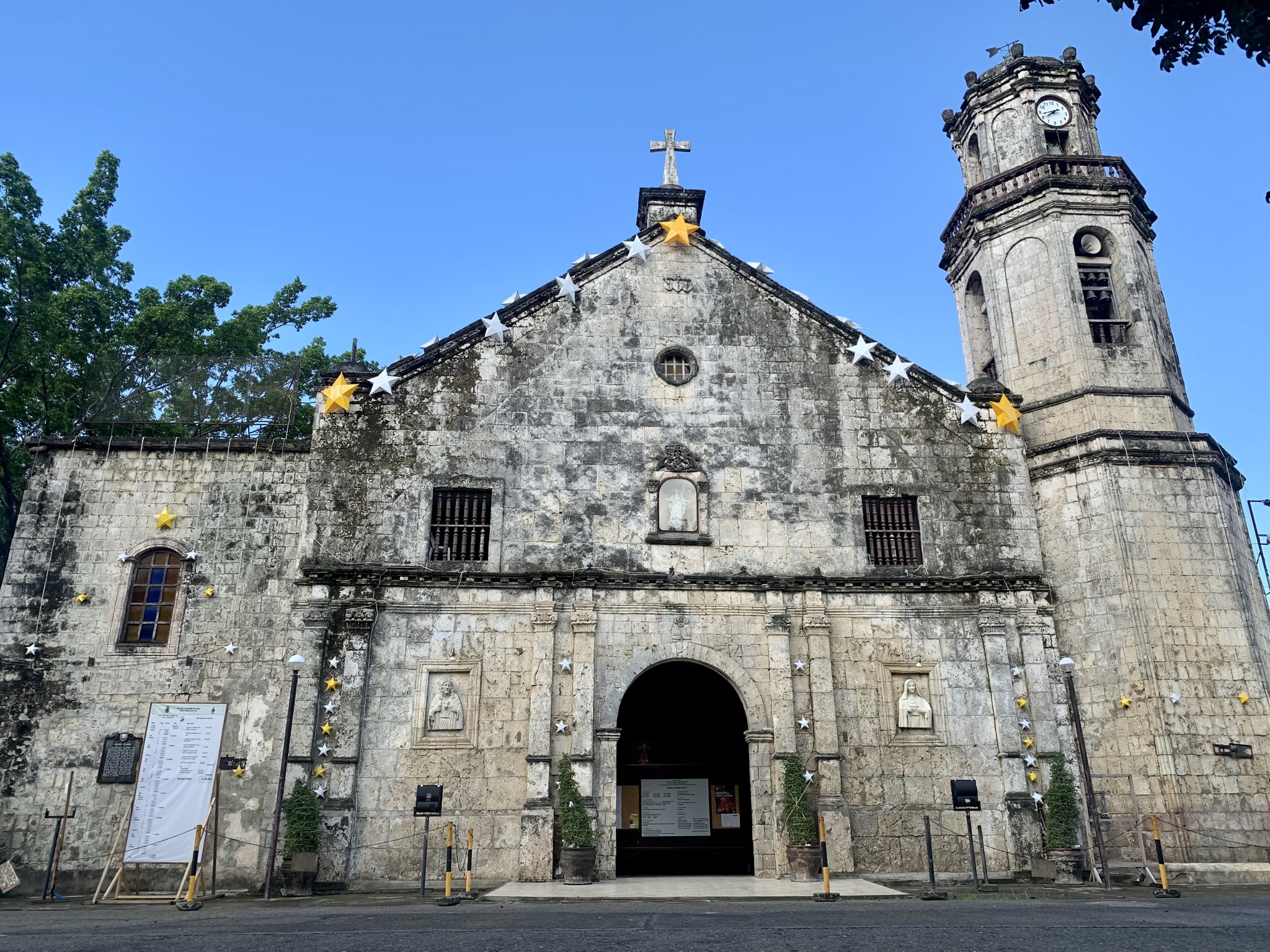
- Maasin Cathedral

- Coat of arms

Location
- Country: Philippines
- Territory: Southern Leyte; Leyte (Bato, Baybay, Hilongos, Hindang, Inopacan, Matalom)
- Ecclesiastical province: Cebu
- Metropolitan: Cebu
- Coordinates: 10°07′57″N 124°50′17″E

Statistics
- Area: 2,505 km^{2} (967 sq mi)
- Population: Total; Catholics: (as of 2021); 741,781; 652,087 (87.9%)
- Parishes: 47

Information
- Denomination: Catholic
- Sui iuris church: Latin Church
- Rite: Roman Rite
- Established: 23 March 1968
- Cathedral: Cathedral of Our Lady of the Assumption
- Patron saint: Our Lady of the Assumption

Current leadership
- Pope: Leo XIV
- Bishop: Precioso D. Cantillas
- Metropolitan Archbishop: Alberto Uy
- Vicar General: Oscar A. Cadayona

Website
- Website of the Diocese

The former coat of arms of the Diocese of Maasin, used from 1968 to 2015

The Diocese of Maasin (Lat: Dioecesis Maasinensis) is a diocese of the Latin Church of the Catholic Church in the Philippines, comprising the province of Southern Leyte and six municipalities of Leyte. Erected in 1968, the diocese was erected from the Archdiocese of Palo. At present, the diocese has experienced no jurisdictional changes, and is a suffragan of the Archdiocese of Cebu. The current bishop is Precioso Cantillas, appointed in 1998.

The diocese comprises the entire province of Southern Leyte, and the municipalities of Matalom, Bato, Hilongos, Hindang, and Inopacan, as well as the city of Baybay in the province of Leyte, with the Maasin Cathedral as the seat of the diocese. The diocese consists of 43 parishes and one chaplaincy within five vicarates.

== History ==
The Diocese of Maasin encompasses the province of Southern Leyte, located in the southeastern portion of Leyte island. Off its southern coast lies the island of Limasawa, historically recognized as the site of the first Catholic Mass in the Philippines. The Mass was celebrated by Father Pedro Valderrama and attended by Ferdinand Magellan and the local chieftain, Rajah Kolambu.

The territory comprising the present-day Diocese of Maasin was originally under the jurisdiction of the Diocese of Cebu from 1595 to 1910. It was subsequently transferred to the Diocese of Calbayog from 1910 to 1937, and then to the Diocese of Palo from 1937 until 1968.

Pope Paul VI canonically erected the Diocese of Maasin on August 14, 1968, through the apostolic constitution ''Dei Filium adorandum'', issued on March 23, 1968. It was established as a suffragan of the Archdiocese of Cebu.[3] Vicente T. Ataviado was appointed as its first bishop in June 1968. He was consecrated on August 8 and formally installed on August 14 at the Our Lady of Assumption Parish Church in Maasin.

The diocesan population is approximately 558,804, of which around 90 percent identify as Catholic. The majority of the population is Cebuano-speaking. The diocese's parishes are supported by a network of lay ministers and volunteer catechists.

The Diocese of Maasin has started to focus on the vision of the Second Plenary Council of the Philippines. Apart from the usual ministerial and sacramental functions, the clergy has succeeded to penetrate the people's conscience with concern for other issues, such as reforestation.

The Social Action Center has offered help in livelihood projects to those who do not have the necessary capital. This has been successful in the abaca business enterprise. The center is now in the process of opening up more opportunities for more livelihood projects. The Commission on Youth is helping in the formation of the youth in all the parishes of the diocese through youth encounters and leadership training. It has organized nine diocesan summer youth camps between 1993 and 2015, attended by more than a thousand delegates.

In 1993 the Diocese of Maasin marked its 25th anniversary as a diocese. The theme of the celebration set the direction which the diocese planned to follow in the next decade: "RENEWAL: the challenge of the faithful in the Diocese of Maasin."

Thus the vision that was planted and took root when Pedro Valderrama celebrated the first Mass in the Philippines on March 21, 1521, has borne new fruit. Aside from the prospects of renewal for the entire diocese, the Chaplaincy of Limasawa was raised to that of a parish – the Holy Cross and First Mass of Limasawa Parish, on March 29, 1994, more than four centuries later.

== Ordinaries ==
Bishop		Period in office	Coat of arms
1.	Vicente Ataviado y Tumalad	17 Jun 1968 appointed – 4 Mar 1997 died (28 years, 257 days)	
2.	Precioso D. Cantillas	20 Jan 1998 – present (28 years, 188 days)	

== See also ==
- Official website: http://www.dioceseofmaasin.com
- Catholic Church in the Philippines
