= Maasin Cathedral =

Roman Catholic church in Southern Leyte, Philippines

- National Shrine and Cathedral Parish of Our Lady of the Assumption
- Pambansang Dambana at Katedral ng Birhen ng Asuncion (Filipino); Santuario Nacional y Catedral de Nuestra Señora de la Asunción (Spanish)
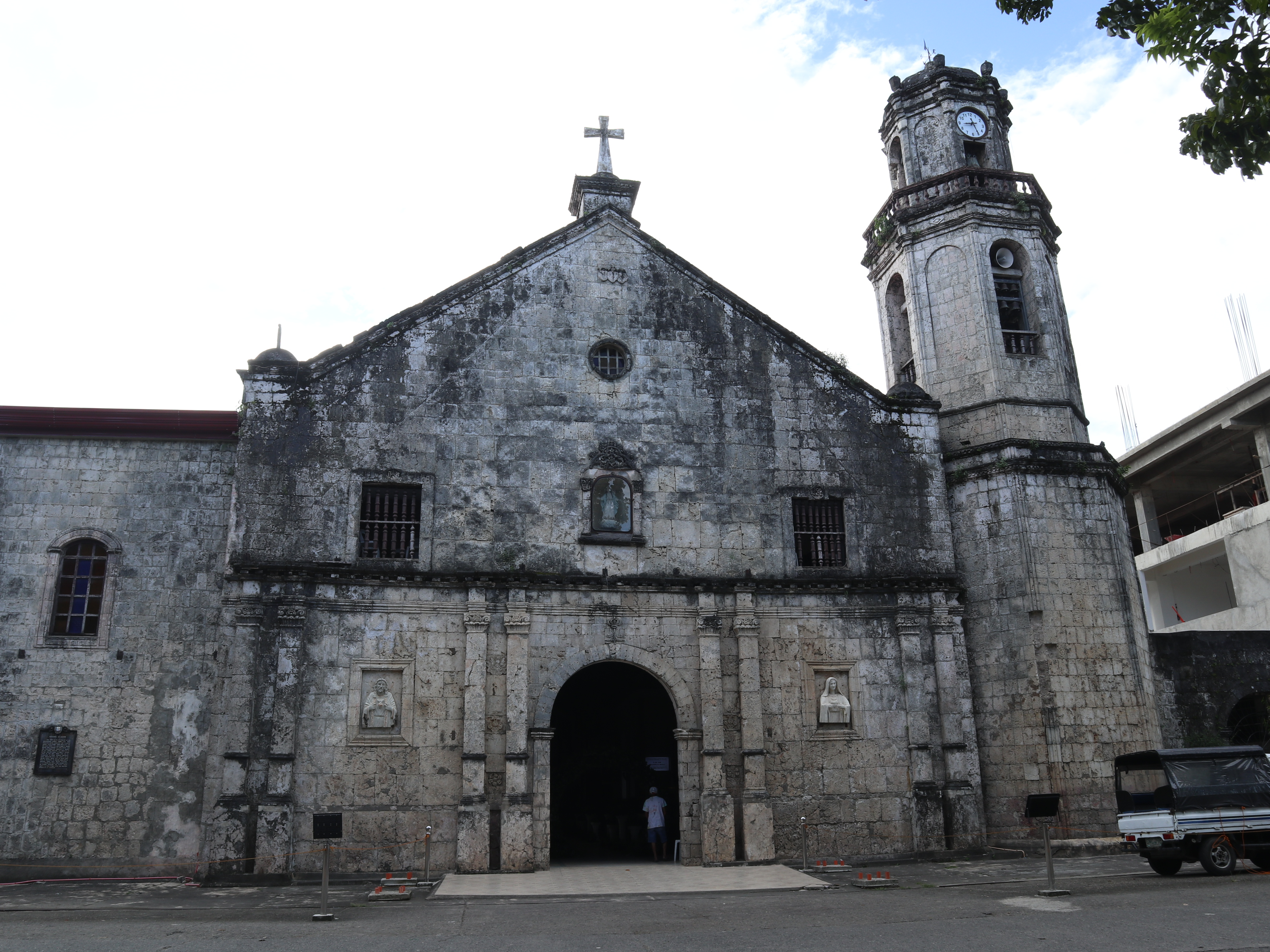
- Cathedral facade in January 2024

- Location in the Visayas Location in the Philippines
- 10°07′58″N 124°50′19″E
- Location: Maasin, Southern Leyte
- Country: Philippines
- Denomination: Roman Catholic

History
- Status: Cathedral, National shrine
- Founded: 1755; 271 years ago
- Founder: Society of Jesus
- Dedication: Our Lady of the Assumption
- Consecrated: 1768; 258 years ago

Architecture
- Functional status: Active
- Architect(s): Fr. Toribio Padilla, Fr. Felix Magno
- Architectural type: Church building
- Style: Baroque
- Completed: 1771; 255 years ago
- Demolished: 1754 (Moro attacks); 1882 (fire)

Administration
- Province: Cebu
- Metropolis: Cebu
- Diocese: Maasin
- Deanery: Vicariate of Assumption in the Hills

Clergy
- Bishop(s): Most Rev. Precioso D. Cantillas, SDB, DD
- Rector: Rev. Fr. Mark Vincent D. Salang

The National Shrine and Cathedral Parish of Our Lady of the Assumption, commonly known as Maasin Cathedral, is a baroque Roman Catholic church in Maasin, Southern Leyte, Philippines. It is the seat of the Diocese of Maasin.

The church is home to one of the oldest parishes of the country. The cathedral also houses a 200-year old antique statue of the Nuestra Señora de la Asunción de Maasin or known as the "Patrona". The Maasin parish established by the series of waves of missionaries namely the Jesuits, Augustinians and finally, Franciscans. Originally built in 1700 by Jesuit priests, the church suffered several destruction and damage over the years, but was rebuilt many times by the orders succeeding the Jesuits. Its present-day structure is constructed at 1968 and subsequently became the seat of the Roman Catholic Diocese of Maasin which covers the City of Maasin and the other municipalities of Southern Leyte, including the towns of Matalom, Bato, Hilongos, Hindang, Inopacan and the City of Baybay in the province of Leyte.

== History ==
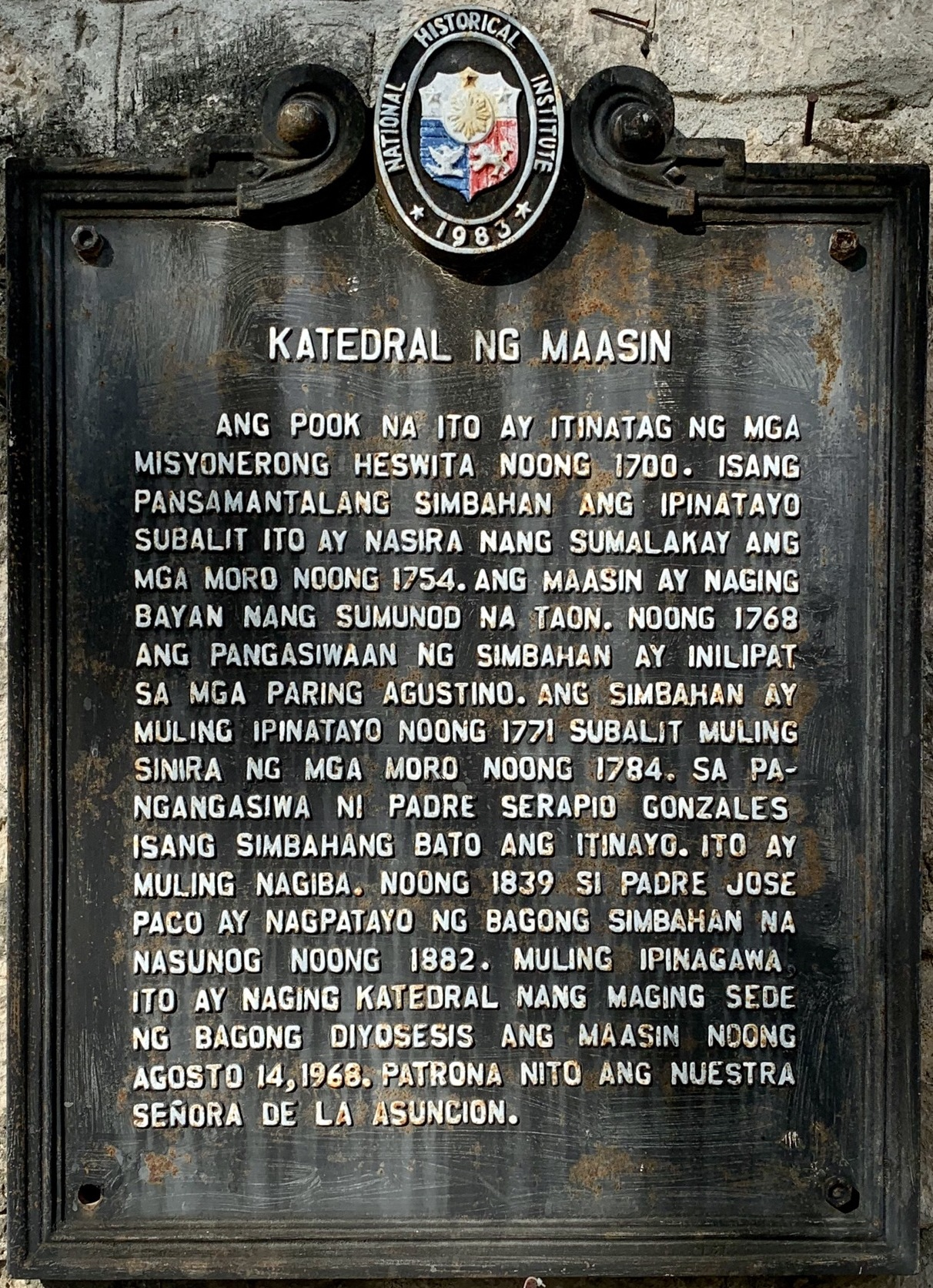
Church historical marker issued by the National Historical Institute in 1983

Early records indicate that Maasin is one of the oldest towns in Southern Leyte. When the Spanish missionaries arrived there, they found the native population to be relatively organized, friendly and interested in the Catholic faith. The Jesuits were the first order to formally establish a parish in the community in the year 1700. A piece of stone from a destroyed convent bearing the inscription "Pa. De Tagnipa - año 1776." authenticates the establishment. The ruins exist until the present time, lying between the border of Abgao and Mantahan districts.

The province suffered heavily from the attacks of the Moro people's resistance against Spanish colonizers and the original church was destroyed in 1754. Following the departure of the Jesuits, the Augustinian fathers took over the parish in 1771 and ordered the construction of the second concrete church a kilometer away from the ruins of the first one. This is the present-day location of the church. However, it suffered another extensive damage in the hands of the Moros on 1784. Another wave of missionaries came in 1843, this time the Franciscans, and they succeeded on establishing Our Lady of Assumption as the Patroness of the Parish on August 15. The church was damaged by fire in 1882. Reconstruction was carried out immediately by Filipino secular priests Fr. Toribio Padilla and Fr. Felix Magno. The people continued to celebrate August 15 as the town's official fiesta until the present time. The Franciscans managed over the ecclesiastical order until 1896 until they were forced to leave due to the Philippine Revolution, which established the short-lived Philippine republic in the municipal government under the order of General Lukban. After the tumultuous events, a native clergy took over the church.

By 1920s until 1930s, the parish was placed in the care of the diocesan priests of Cebu. It was then transferred to the Diocese of Calbayog and Diocese of Palo, until in 1968, it became the cathedral seat of the Diocese of Maasin on August 14. It ranks as the Cathedral Parish of the diocese.

In 1993, the Diocese of Maasin marked its 25th anniversary as a diocese. Aside from the prospects of renewal for the entire diocese, the Chaplaincy of Limasawa was raised to that of a parish – the Holy Cross and First Mass of Limasawa Parish, on March 29, 1994, more than four centuries later.

Between 2016 and 2018 the cathedral took on a renovation project in preparation of the diocese's 50th anniversary.

In 2018, the Diocese of Maasin celebrated its 50th Golden Jubilee Anniversary and some activities and the concluding Mass of the year long celebration was instituted in the Maasin Cathedral. The Golden Jubilee Vigil of 10,000 Youth and the Thanksgiving Mass were joined and presided over by Cardinal Luis Antonio Tagle from the Archdiocese of Manila together with Bishop Precioso Cantillas from the host, the Diocese of Maasin, Bishop Gabriele Giordano Caccia the Apostolic Nuncio and Papal Representative to the Philippines, Archbishop José S. Palma from the Archdiocese of Cebu, Archbishop Romulo Valles from the Archdiocese of Davao and the president of the Catholic Bishops' Conference of the Philippines and Bishop Leopoldo C. Jaucia from the Diocese of Bangued. In recognition of the numerous miracles that were attributed to the intercession of Nuestra Señora de la Asuncion de Maasin, on the closing rites of the Golden Jubilee of the Diocese of Maasin, the altar image or the "Patrona" received the honor of episcopal coronation headed by Cardinal Tagle on August 15, 2018, during the Thanksgiving Mass and the Solemnity of the Assumption of Mary.

In December 2021 the cathedral was heavily damaged during Typhoon Rai leading to several shattered windows and the replacement of the entire roofing.

The diocese comprises the entire province of Southern Leyte, and the towns of Matalom, Bato, Hilongos, Hindang, Inopacan and Baybay in the province of Leyte, with the Maasin Parish Cathedral as the seat of the diocese. Distributed within its 2,505 square kilometres (967 sq mi) of land are 38 parishes and 1 quasi-parish. To facilitate administration, these parishes have been grouped under 6 vicariates.

The province of Southern Leyte is located in the southeastern portion of the island of Leyte. And the small island of Limasawa off its southern coast is historically significant as the place where Ferdinand Magellan landed, after having sailed from the island of Homonhon in Samar, to celebrate the first Catholic mass in the Philippines. The chieftain of Limasawa, Kolambu and his men, with Magellan and his men, attended that first mass celebrated by Father Pedro Valderrama.

The population of Southern Leyte is made up mostly of Cebuano-speaking people because of its closeness, geographically, to Cebu and Bohol. This population has now reached a total of 558,804, of which 90 per cent are Catholics.

== National Shrine status ==
On July 6, 2024, the Catholic Bishops Conference of the Philippines announced that the cathedral will be elevated to the status of National shrine, along with the Shrine of Our Lady of Mercy in Novaliches, Quezon City. The elevation rites were held on August 14, 2024, presided by Cardinal Jose Advincula.

== Patroness ==
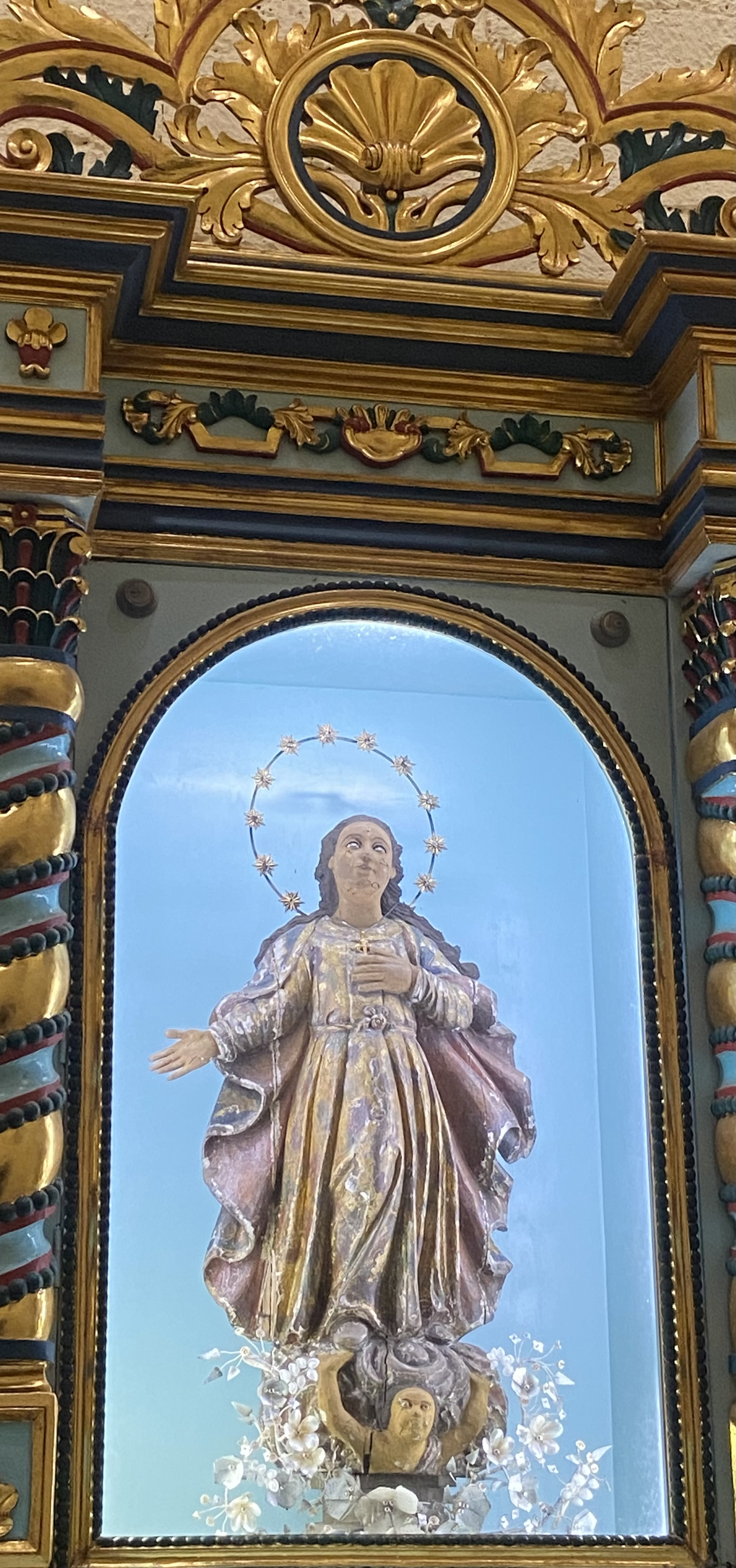
Wooden Image of the Assumption in her side altar at the Maasin Cathedral-Shrine

The people of Maasin developed a strong devotion to the venerated image of Our Lady of the Assumption. For centuries, numerous miracles were reported through her intercession, most well known is the protection of her chosen city from different calamities. There were two images of the Our Lady of the Assumption enshrined in her Cathedral in Maasin City: the original antique wooden image and the canonically crowned ivory altar and processional image.

=== The Antique Wooden Image of the Virgen de la Asunción de Maasin ===
The original wooden image of Nuestra Señora de la Asuncion is a de tallado image where the Virgin is standing on a cloud with cherubs, has loose yet wavy hair, her right hand is outstretched and her left was on her chest looking upwards. The original yet fragile image is currently enshrined in a special chapel dedicated to her for veneration.

=== The Original Ivory Image of the Nuestra Señora de la Asunción de Maasin also known as the "Patrona" ===
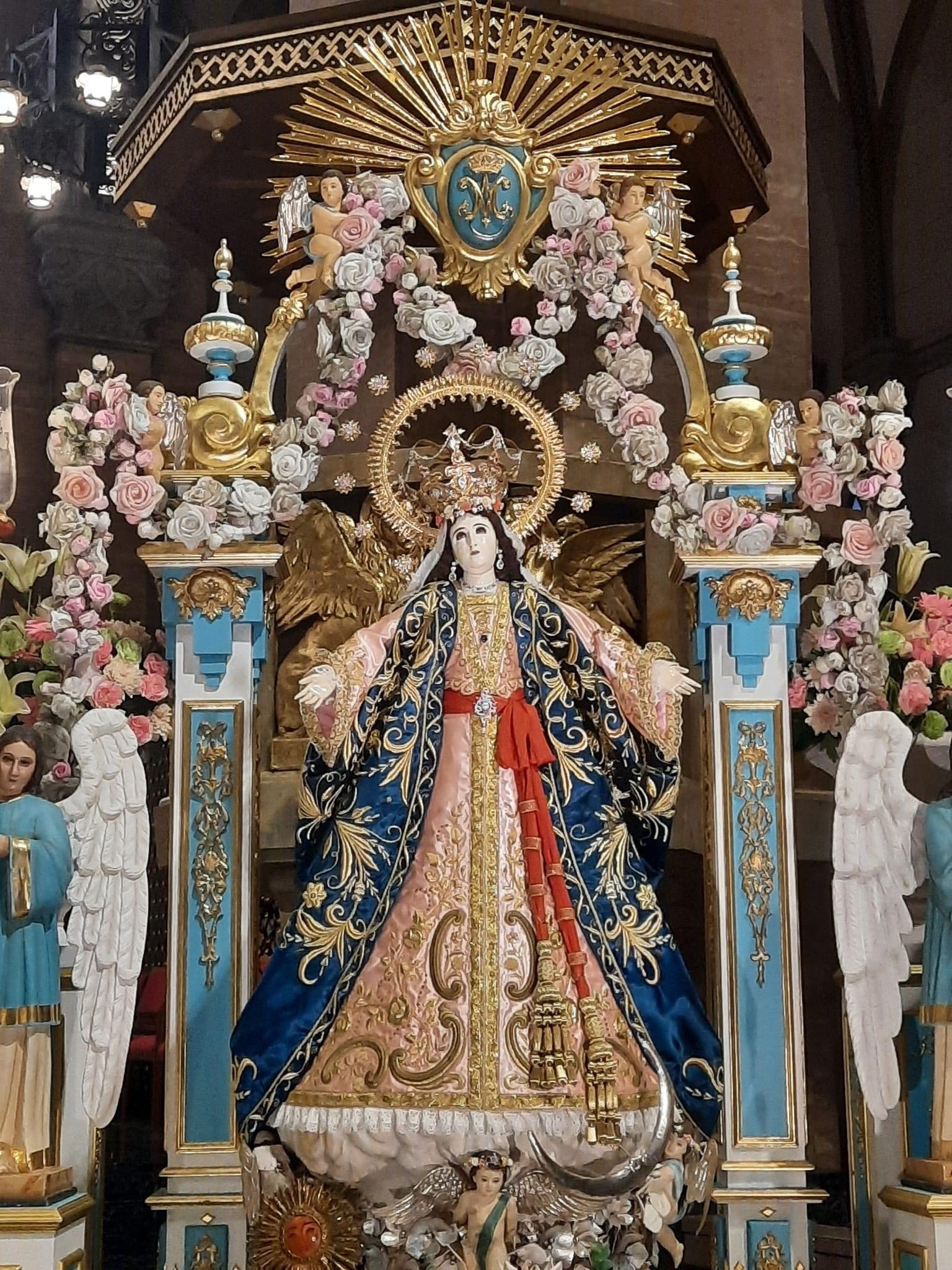
The canonically crowned venerated ivory Marian image of the Mahal nga Patrona during a visit to the Manila Cathedral in 2023.

The second image was that of a de vestir image where the body was made of wood and her head and hands are made of ivory. The image is vested with a robe and a cloak made from different materials and embroidery styles offered by her devotees. This image presents the Virgin with her arms outstretched upwards and eyes looking upwards. This image features a crown and is the current altar and processional image of the cathedral. In recognition of the numerous miracles that were attributed to the intercession of Nuestra Señora de la Asuncion de Maasin, on the closing rites of the Golden Jubilee of the Diocese of Maasin, the altar image received the honor of Episcopal Coronation on August 15, 2018 - the Solemnity of the Assumption of the Blessed Virgin Mary headed by Cardinal Tagle. Pope Francis later granted a decree of canonical coronation on December 14, 2021, and the image of the Virgin was crowned by Charles John Brown, Papal Nuncio to the Philippines, on August 13, 2022.

== Features of the cathedral ==
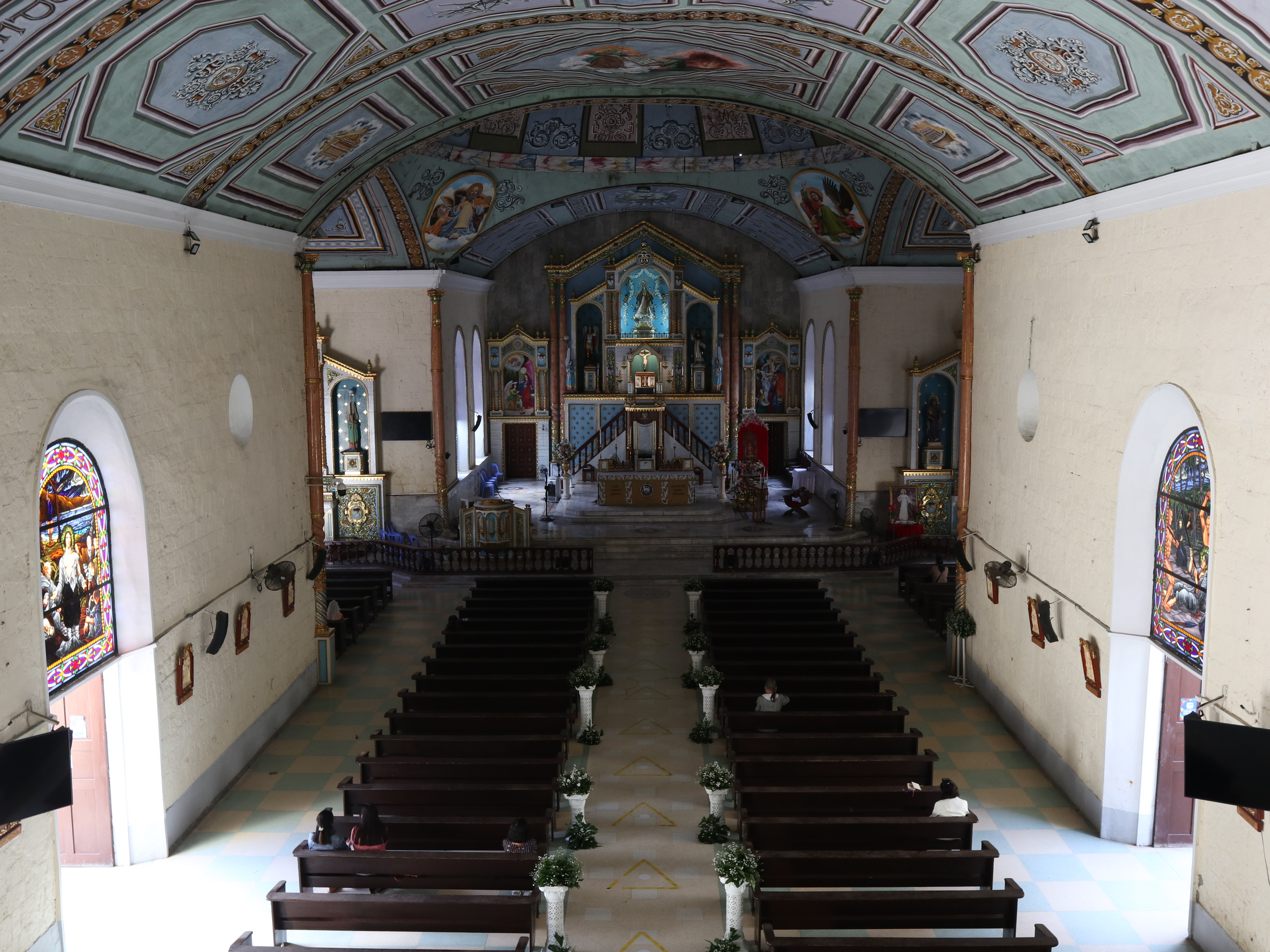
Cathedral-Shrine interior in 2024

The main church building

The present design heavily borrows from the characteristics of baroque churches in the Philippines, with its traditional triangular pediment and simple facade punctuated by rectangular niches for the images and windows. However, a seemingly modern style was applied as shown by its rounded, three-layered bell tower which is a common feature among late-18th-century churches.

Cathedral-Shrine facade in August 2026

Plaza Asuncion

Beside the cathedral is the Plaza Asuncion, which features the large image of the Our Lady of the Assumption, the former altar image of the cathedral following the changes during the Second Vatican Council. The image was transferred from inside the cathedral and placed in the plaza following renovations of the cathedral complex in 2017.

Main Retablo and Side Altars

Following the reforms associated with the Second Vatican Council, several old retablos were removed from Catholic churches, including the cathedral in Maasin City. The retablo image, the 200-year old image of the Our Lady of the Assumption, locally known as the Mahal nga Patrona, was placed under the care of a local family in the late 1970s.

Under the direction of Bishop Precioso D. Cantillas, SDB, DD, the old image was restored and placed back in the cathedral in a new baldochino at the central altar on September 24, 2015.

In 2017, a major renovation of the cathedral complex was undertaken. A new main retablo was constructed to permanently return the old image of the Mahal nga Patrona as the centerpiece of the main altar. accompanied by the images of St. Michael the Archangel and Saint Vincent Ferrer on either sides. The larger statue of Our Lady of the Assumption that had previously occupied the altar was subsequently transferred outside the cathedral and placed within the newly developed Plaza Asunción.

In 2018, further renovations were undertaken in preparation for the Golden Jubilee celebrations of the Diocese of Maasin. New side altars were installed within the cathedral. The former baptismal font was transferred to the right wing of the cathedral, where images of Saints Peter and Paul and the Santo Niño de Limasawa were placed at the altar. On the left wing, an image of Saint Joseph with the Child Jesus was placed at the center, accompanied by images of Saint Anthony of Padua and Saint Padre Pio on either side.
