= Biliran Watchtower =

Watchtower ruin in Biliran, Philippines

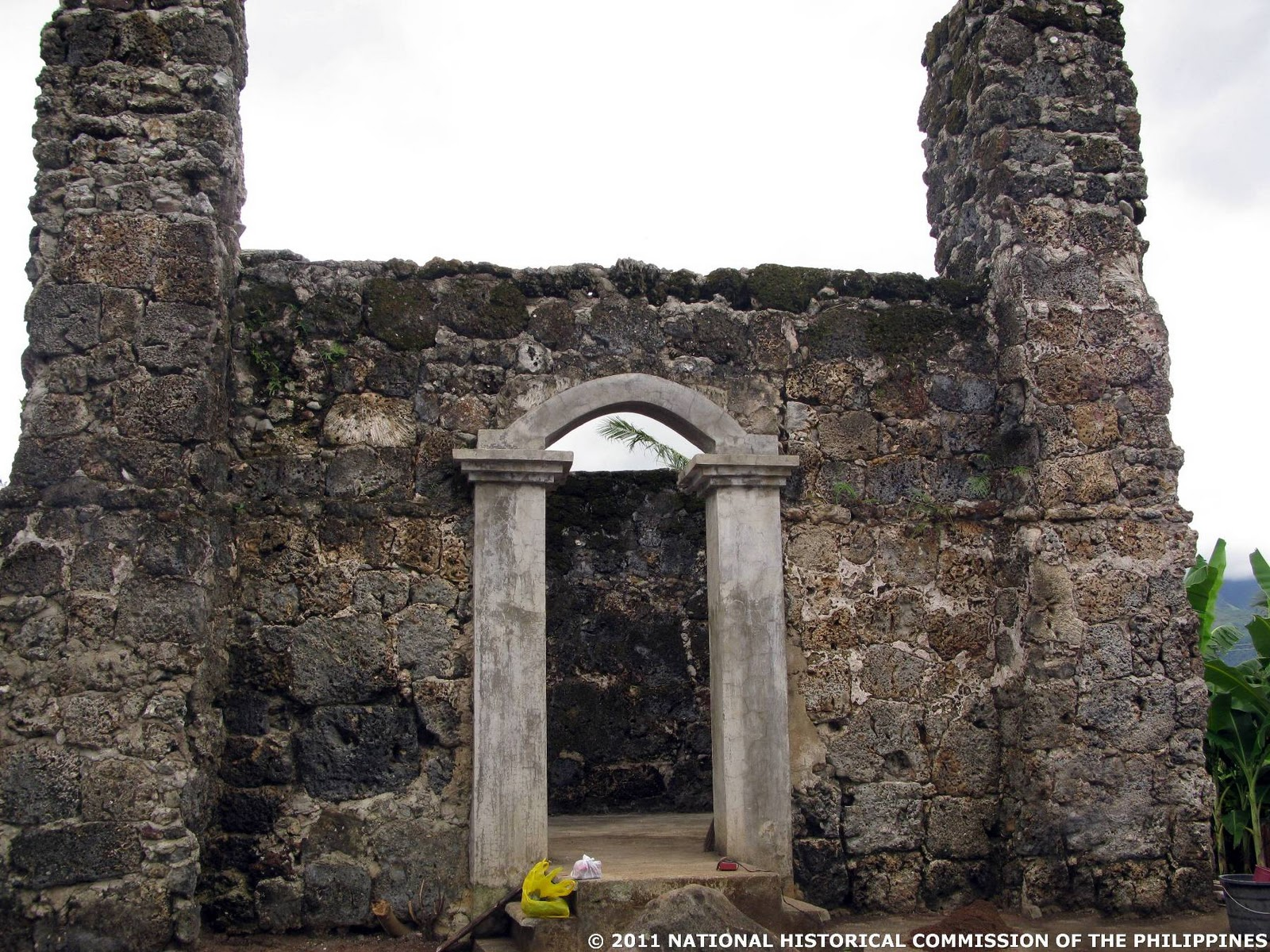
- Ruins
- Interactive map of the Biliran Watchtower area
- Alternative names: Nasunugan Watchtower

General information
- Status: Ruins
- Type: Watchtower
- Location: Biliran, Philippines
- Coordinates: 11°27′50″N 124°28′47″E
- Completed: 1765
- Destroyed: 1774

Technical details
- Material: Coral

The Biliran Watchtower, also known as Nasunugan Watchtower, is a watchtower ruin located in Biliran, Philippines.

Built in 1765 under the initiative of Filipino priest Gaspar Ignacio de Guevara, the watchtower was used to watch Biliran's coast for Muslim raids. In 1774, the raiders attacked and burned the local settlement, including the watchtower.

In 2000, the watchtower was reconstructed using its original materials. In 2008, the National Historical Institute (now the National Historical Commission of the Philippines) installed a historical marker on the watchtower.
