= Tanauan Church (Leyte) =

Roman Catholic church in Leyte, Philippines

- Assumption of Our Lady Parish Church
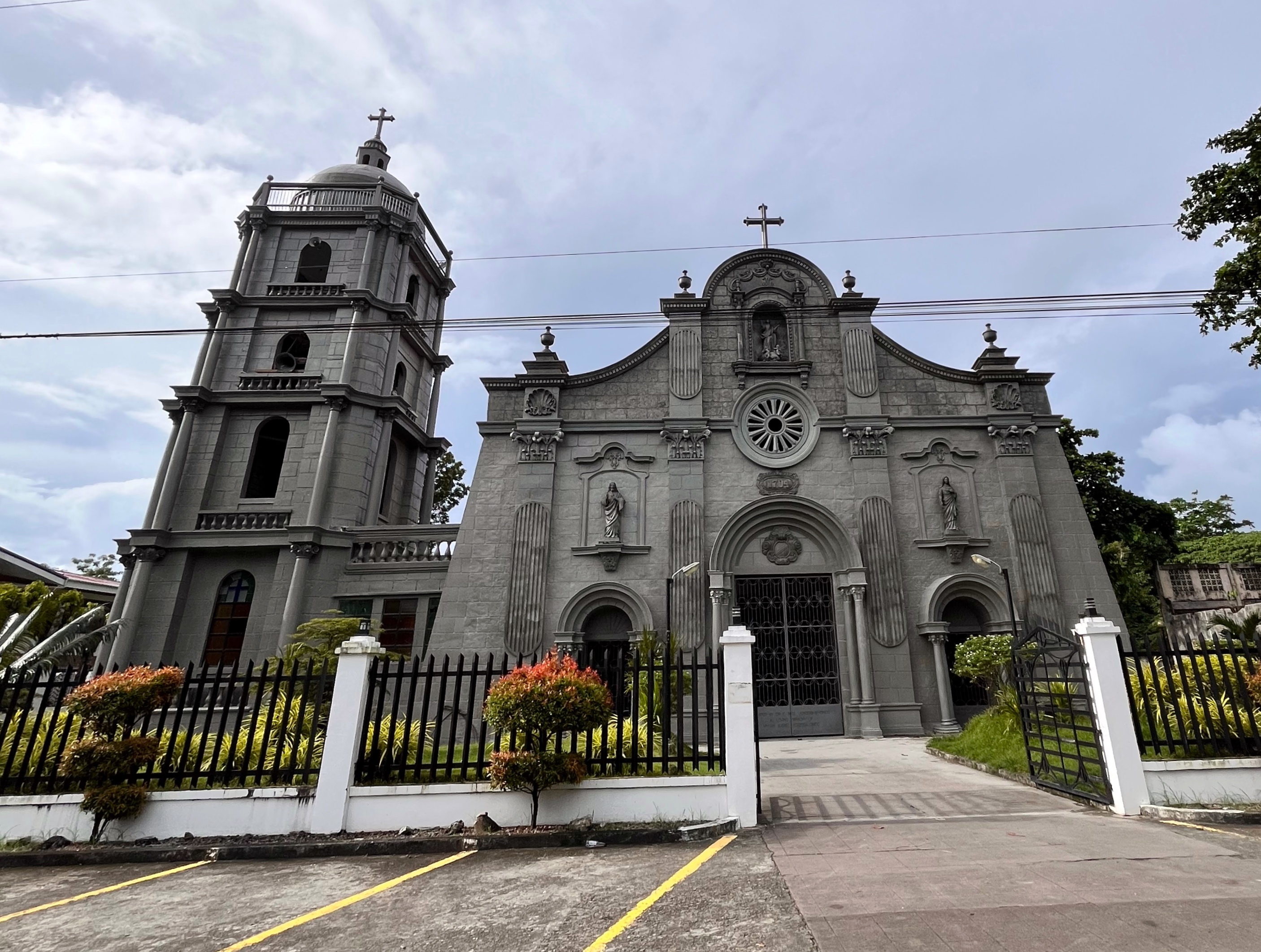
- Church facade in 2025

- Location in the Visayas Location in the Philippines
- 11°6′45.817″N 125°1′2.622″E
- Location: Tanauan, Leyte
- Country: Philippines
- Denomination: Roman Catholic

History
- Status: Parish church
- Dedication: Assumption of Mary

Architecture
- Functional status: Active
- Heritage designation: National Historical Landmark
- Designated: 1949
- Architectural type: Church building
- Completed: 1704; 322 years ago

Administration
- Archdiocese: Palo

The Assumption of Our Lady Parish Church, commonly known as Tanauan Church, is a Roman Catholic church located in Tanauan, Leyte, Philippines. It is under the jurisdiction of the Archdiocese of Palo. First built in 1704, the church was later expanded in 1860 by adding a transept and surrounding it with a wall and watchtowers for defense against pirates. It survived the tidal wave that hit Tanauan in 1897.

The National Historical Commission of the Philippines (NHCP) declared the church a national historical landmark in 1949.

During Typhoon Haiyan in 2013, the church served as an evacuation center for the locals.

== Gallery ==
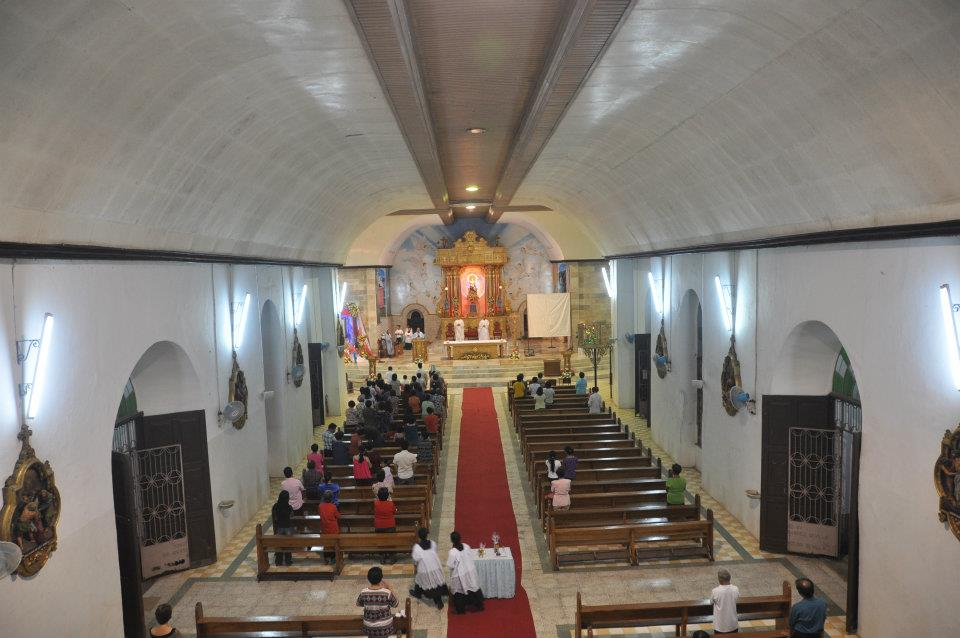
Church interior

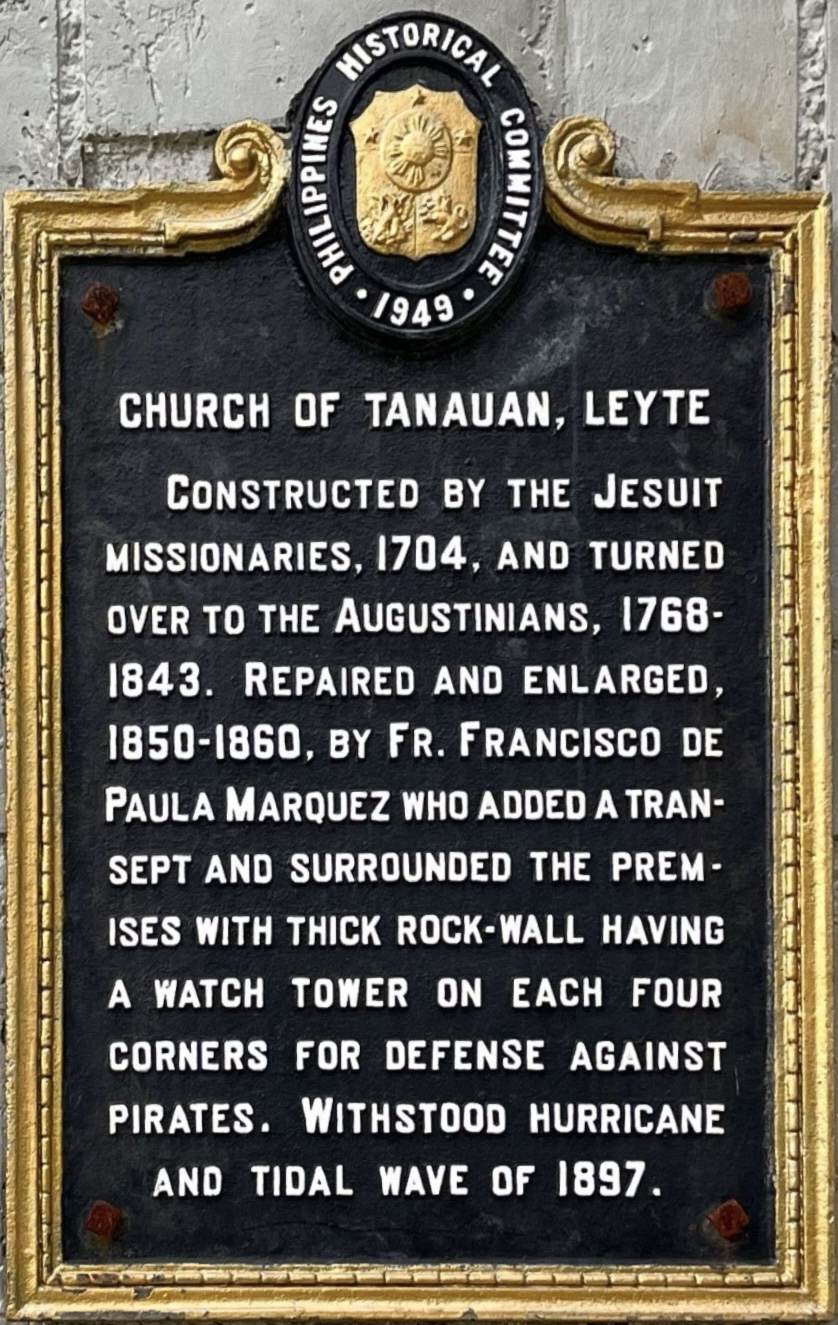
Church PHC historical marker installed in 1949
