= Canigao Island =

Islet in Matalom, Leyte, Philippines

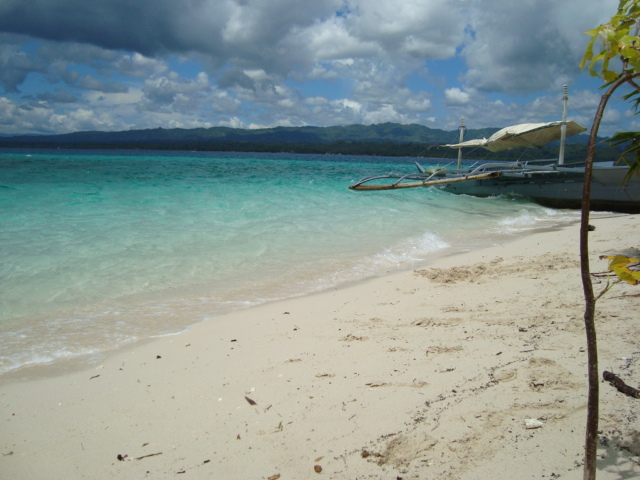
- Canigao Island's blue waters

- Location within Visayas, Philippines Location within Philippines

Geography
- Location: Camotes Sea
- Coordinates: 10°14′53″N 124°45′1″E
- Adjacent to: Camotes Sea; Canigao Channel; Bohol Sea

Administration
- Philippines
- Region: Eastern Visayas
- Province: Leyte
- Municipality: Matalom

Demographics
- Population: uninhabited (2006)

Canigao is an islet located in the Philippines, in the municipality of Matalom, Leyte. The area is known for abundant fishing grounds and scenic coral reef areas suitable for diving.

== Features ==
Canigao Island is uninhabited, featuring a lighthouse as its only significant man-made structure. The beaches have white sand, with tropical sea creatures and extensive coral reef in the surrounding waters. The climate is tropical and similar to that found in other areas of the Philippine islands. These natural features often attract tourists and scuba divers, who arrive at the island by traveling from Matalom (in the province of Leyte).

The western and northern part of Canigao island is placed under nature protection as a sanctuary. Due to this, activities such as swimming, diving, fishing, snorkeling, and boating in the protected areas are limited by law.

== Gallery ==
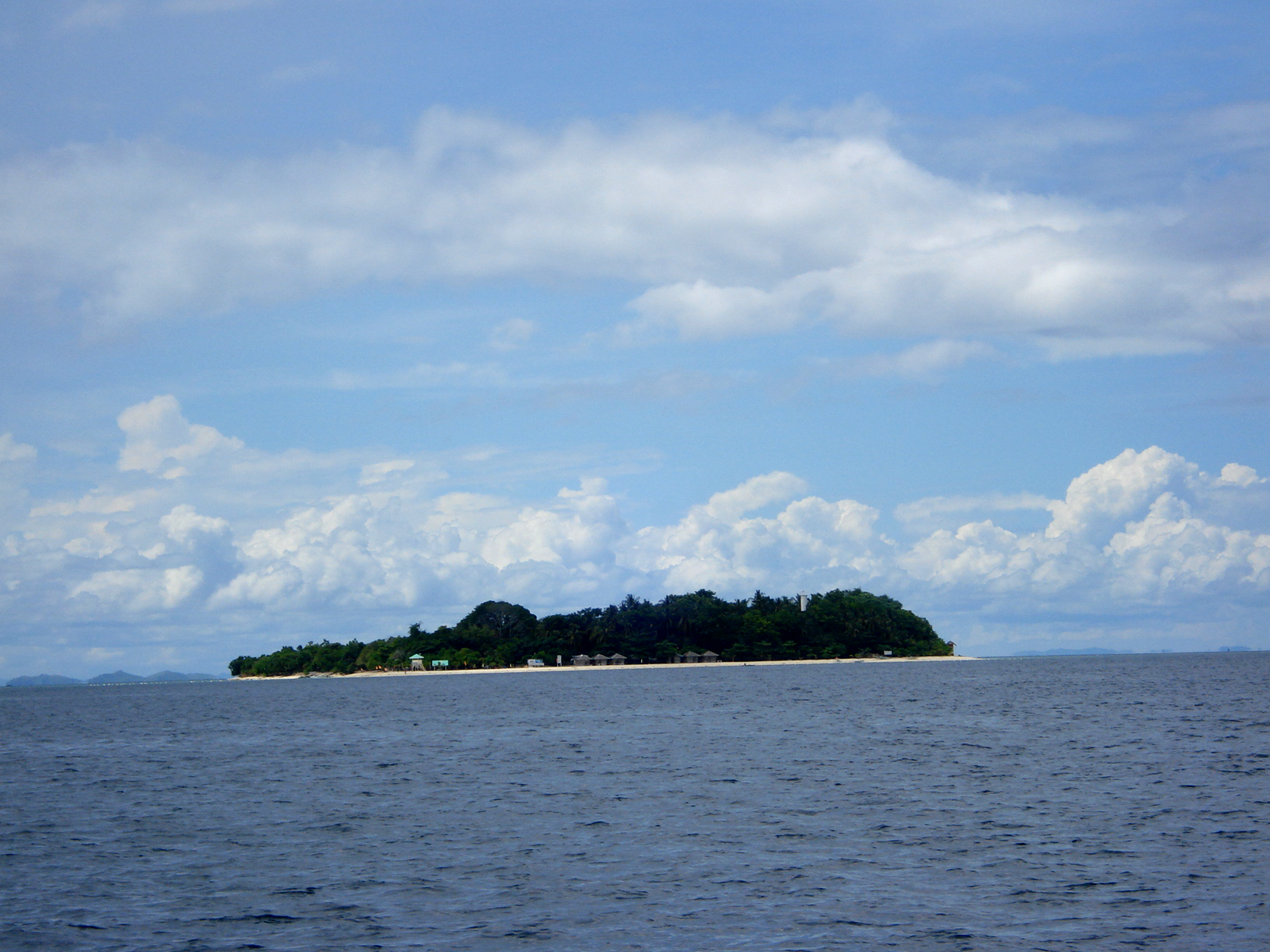
It's 20 minutes away from the port of Matalom, Leyte via ferryboat.

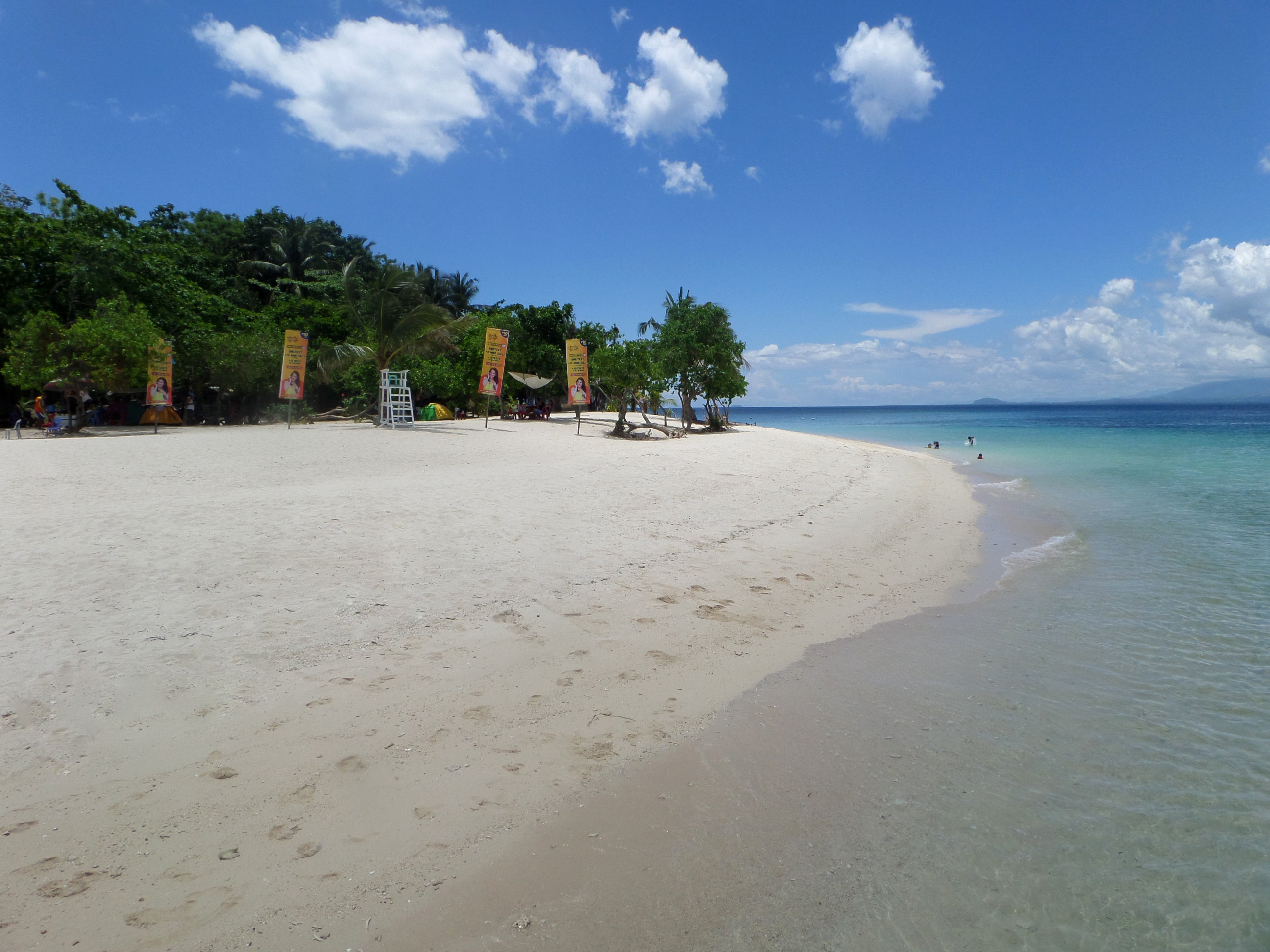
View on the north side of the island

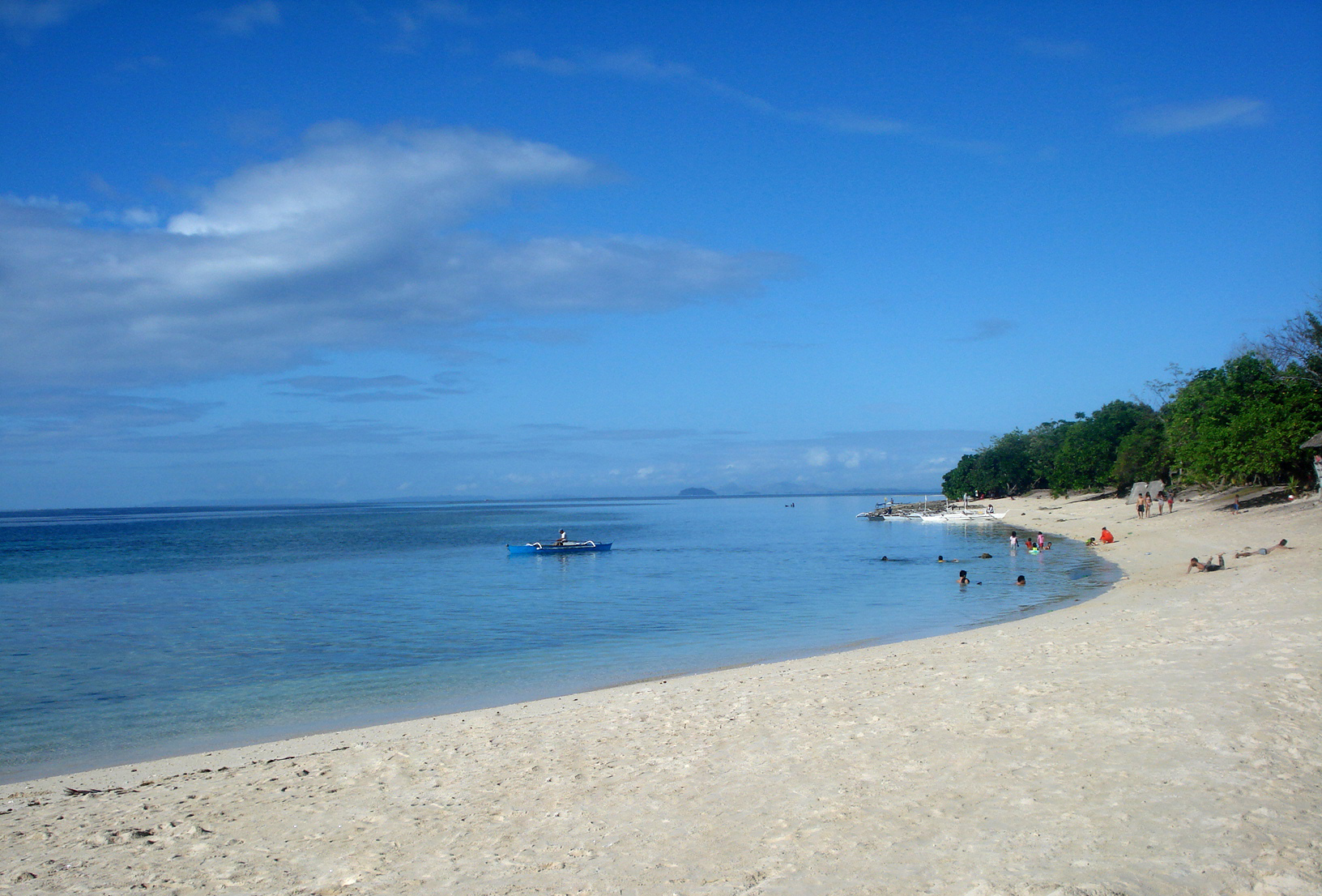
View on the east side of the island

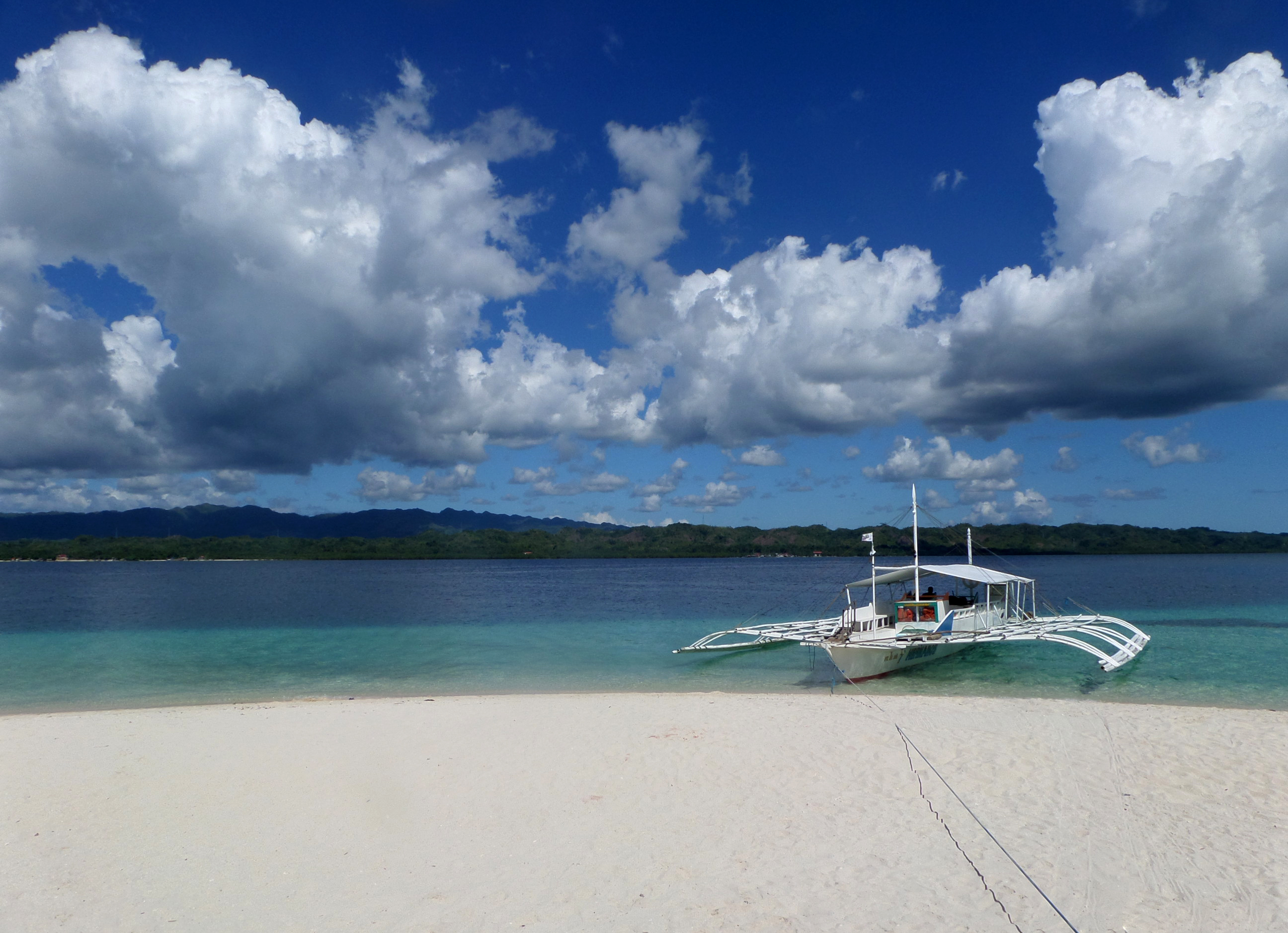
The crystal clear blue water and powdery sand of Canigao Island.

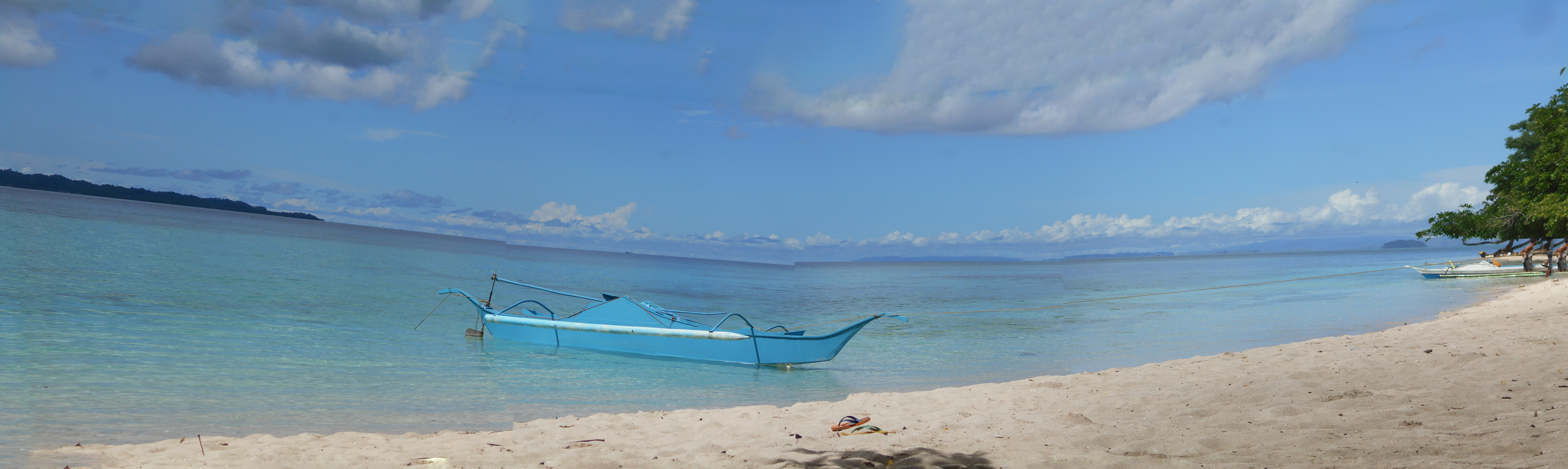
Panoramic view of Canigao from the east side

== See also ==
- Desert island
- List of islands
