= Matalom =

Municipality in Leyte, Philippines

- Municipality
- Municipality of Matalom
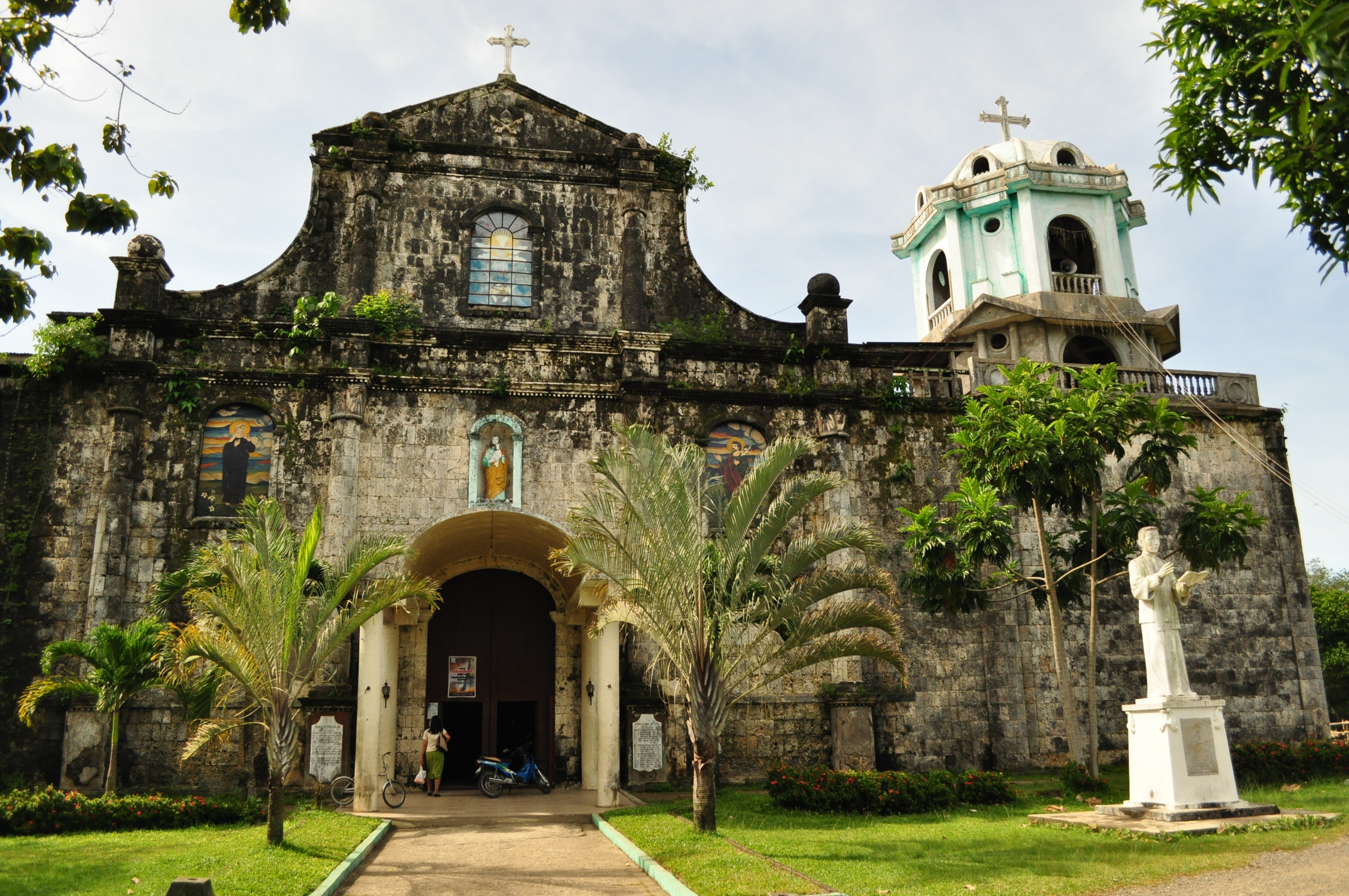
- Church of Matalom

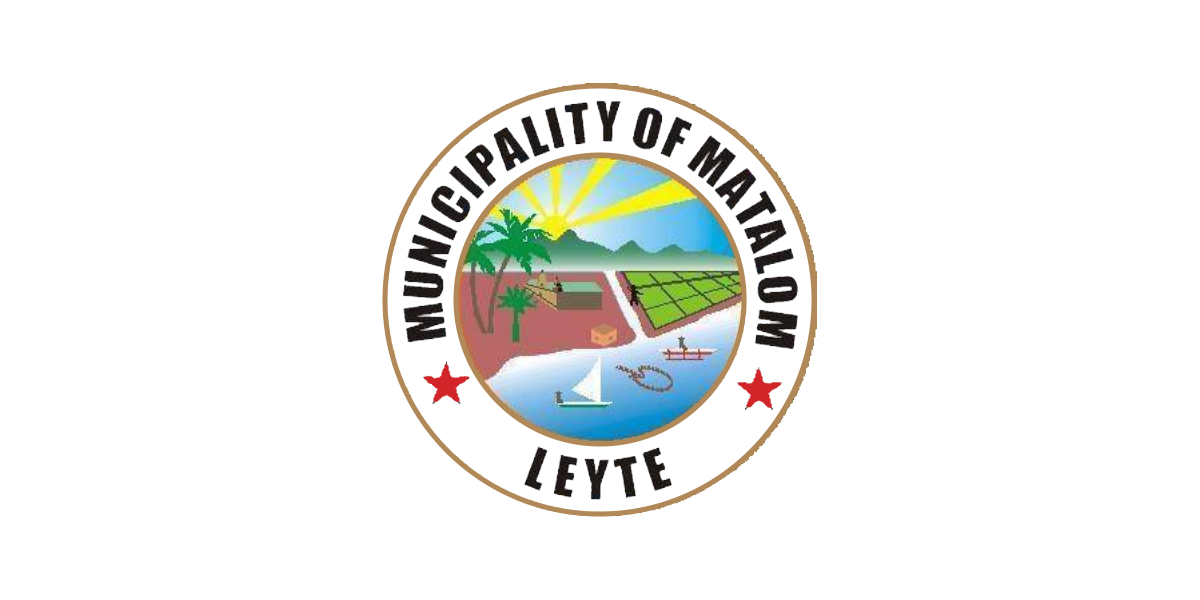
- Flag

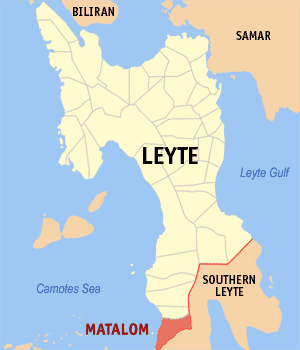
- Map of Leyte with Matalom highlighted
- Interactive map of Matalom
- Location within the Philippines
- Coordinates: 10°17′N 124°48′E
- Country: Philippines
- Region: Eastern Visayas
- Province: Leyte
- District: 5th district
- Barangays: 30 (see Barangays)

Government
  - Type: Sangguniang Bayan
  - Mayor: Eric S. Pajulio
  - Vice Mayor: Rikrik Jay S. Pajulio
  - Representative: Carl Nicolas C. Cari
  - Councilors: List: • Constancio D. Gado; • Ma. Nicholina P. Caube; • Leomilie V. Dances; • Leonard P. Tan; • Alfonso B. Tan; • Nicanor P. Gondaya; • Sabino G. Gerona; • Samuel P. Pael; DILG Masterlist of Officials
  - Electorate: 21,918 voters (2025)

Area
  - Total: 132.00 km^{2} (50.97 sq mi)
- Elevation: 9.5 m (31 ft)
- Highest elevation: 0 m (0 ft)
- Lowest elevation: 0 m (0 ft)

Population (2024 census)
  - Total: 32,604
  - Density: 247.00/km^{2} (639.73/sq mi)
  - Households: 8,154

Economy
  - Income class: 2nd municipal income class
  - Poverty incidence: 29.1% (2023)
  - Revenue: ₱ 196.6 million (2024)
  - Assets: ₱ 606.1 million (2024)
  - Expenditure: ₱ 178.6 million (2024)
  - Liabilities: ₱ 67 million (2024)

Service provider
  - Electricity: Leyte 4 Electric Cooperative (LEYECO 4)
- Time zone: UTC+8 (PST)
- ZIP code: 6526
- PSGC: 0803734000
- IDD : area code: +63 (0)53
- Native languages: Cebuano; Tagalog

Matalom (IPA: [mɐ'talom]), officially the Municipality of Matalom (Cebuano: Lungsod sa Matalom; Waray: Bungto han Matalom; Tagalog: Bayan ng Matalom), is a municipality in the province of Leyte, Philippines. According to the 2024 census, it has a population of 32,604 people.

== Etymology ==
It was said that the Spaniards once saw the flaming red of the flame trees that dotted the shores of Matalom Beach and the scenic Canigao Island and asked the natives the local dialect for "hermosa" or beautiful. The natives answered "Matahum" or "Matalom." This was the origin of the town's name.

== History ==
Before Ferdinand Magellan discovered the Philippines, a sea-faring people lived along the banks of the Matalom River and also on the islet of Canigao (formerly Comigao).

In the middle of the 19th century, the townspeople of Matalom constructed their own parish church, convent, school, and public buildings through their own efforts. These were all accomplished with the leadership of Spanish Friar Leonardo Celes Diaz and Capitan Calixto Pil believed to be the founder and first president of the town.

Leadership in the town's administration may be divided into three regimes: Spanish, American and Postwar (Philippine Independence). The first president of Matalom during the Spanish regime was Capitan Calixto Pil. Succession to the chair of president was patterned after the original dynasty set up by the natives, by Pal and Pil families. Thus, after Kapitan "Itong" (Cpt. Calixto Pil) his son followed. Next in line was Kapitan "Osting" (Cpt. Agustin Pil) then Kapitan "Kulas" (Cpt. Nicolas Pal), then Kapitan "Bentoy" (Cpt. Ruberto Pal), the last president before the transition period from Spanish to American regimes. The council members were then called, "Guinhaupan," acknowledged leader in settlements, now barrios or sitios.

The transition from the American regime to the time the Philippines obtained its independence saw Jeremias Pal re-elected alcalde in 1937 until the outbreak of World War II. The dark days of the Japanese occupation had Antonio Olo as the "puppet mayor". The restoration of the civil government after the war saw the appointment of Primitivo Gopo as the municipal mayor of Matalom.

== Geography ==
=== Barangays ===
Matalom is politically subdivided into 30 barangays. Each barangay consists of puroks and some have sitios.

- Agbanga
- Altavista
- Cahagnaan
- Calumpang
- Caningag
- Caridad Norte
- Caridad Sur
- Elevado
- Esperanza
- Hitoog
- Itum
- Lowan
- Monte Alegre
- President Garcia
- Punong
- San Isidro (Poblacion)
- San Pedro (Poblacion)
- Santo Niño (Poblacion)
- Santa Fe (Tab-Ang)
- San Juan
- San Salvador
- San Vicente
- Santa Paz
- Tag-os
- Templanza
- Tigbao
- Waterloo
- Zaragoza
- Bagong Lipunan
- Taglibas Imelda

=== Climate ===
Climate data for Matalom, Leyte
Month	Jan	Feb	Mar	Apr	May	Jun	Jul	Aug	Sep	Oct	Nov	Dec	Year
Mean daily maximum °C (°F)	28 (82)	29 (84)	29 (84)	30 (86)	30 (86)	30 (86)	29 (84)	29 (84)	29 (84)	29 (84)	29 (84)	29 (84)	29 (84)
Mean daily minimum °C (°F)	22 (72)	22 (72)	22 (72)	23 (73)	25 (77)	25 (77)	25 (77)	25 (77)	25 (77)	24 (75)	24 (75)	23 (73)	24 (75)
Average precipitation mm (inches)	78 (3.1)	57 (2.2)	84 (3.3)	79 (3.1)	118 (4.6)	181 (7.1)	178 (7.0)	169 (6.7)	172 (6.8)	180 (7.1)	174 (6.9)	128 (5.0)	1,598 (62.9)
Average rainy days	16.7	13.8	17.3	18.5	23.2	26.5	27.1	26.0	26.4	27.5	24.6	21.0	268.6
Source: Meteoblue

== Demographics ==
Population census of Matalom

Year	Pop.	±% p.a.
1903	7,165	—
1918	10,176	+2.37%
1939	17,129	+2.51%
1948	17,266	+0.09%
1960	18,010	+0.35%
1970	22,047	+2.04%

Year	Pop.	±% p.a.
1975	24,861	+2.44%
1980	26,182	+1.04%
1990	28,291	+0.78%
1995	28,232	−0.04%
2000	30,216	+1.47%
2007	31,055	+0.38%

Year	Pop.	±% p.a.
2010	31,097	+0.05%
2015	33,121	+1.21%
2020	32,586	−0.34%
2024	32,604	+0.01%

Source: Philippine Statistics Authority

In the 2024 census, the population of Matalom was 32,604 people, with a density of 250 inhabitants per square kilometre or 650 inhabitants per square mile.

== Economy ==
Poverty incidence of Matalom (%)

Source: Philippine Statistics Authority

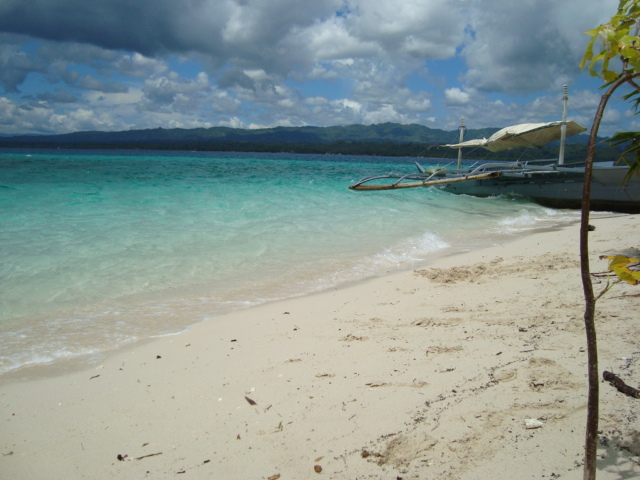
Canigao Island

== Tourism ==
Matalom has become famous for Canigao Island.
