= Rex Ramirez =

Filipino Catholic bishop (born 1967)

The Most Reverend Rex Cullingham Ramirez D.D.
- Bishop of Naval
- Province: Palo
- See: Naval
- Appointed: October 13, 2017
- Installed: January 12, 2018
- Predecessor: Filomeno Bactol
- Previous post: Vicar General of the Archdiocese of Palo

Orders
- Ordination: March 27, 1997 by Pedro Dean
- Consecration: January 12, 2018 by John F. Du

Personal details
- Born: 15 December 1967 (age 58) Balangiga, Eastern Samar, Philippines
- Motto: In Spiritu Et Veritate
- Coat of arms

Styles of Rex Ramirez
- Reference style: His Excellency; The Most Reverend
- Spoken style: Your Excellency
- Religious style: Bishop

Rex Cullingham Ramirez (born December 15, 1967) is a Filipino bishop of the Catholic Church, currently serving as the Bishop of Naval in Biliran, Philippines. Appointed by Pope Francis on October 13, 2017, he officially assumed his role on January 12, 2018, following the retirement of his predecessor, Bishop Filomeno Bactol.

== Early life and education ==
Ramirez was born on December 15, 1967, in Balangiga, Eastern Samar. He pursued his early seminary formation at the Sacred Heart Seminary in Palo, Leyte. After completing his philosophy studies, he continued his theological education at the Loyola School of Theology at the Ateneo de Manila University. From 1997 to 2007, he pursued further studies at the Pontifical Athenaeum of Saint Anselm in Rome, where he obtained a Licentiate in Liturgy and began doctoral studies.

== Priesthood ==
Ramirez was ordained a priest on March 27, 1997, by Archbishop Pedro Dean for the Roman Catholic Archdiocese of Palo. In the first two years of his priesthood, he served as personal secretary to the archbishop of Palo.

While studying in Rome from 1997 to 2007, he ministered to the Filipino Catholic community, first at the parish of San Leone Magno from 1998 to 2002, and later as chaplain at the House of Spiritual Exercises of the Missionary Sisters of the Sacred Heart. He also served as a chaplain for the Filipino Catholic community in La Storta, under the Diocese of Porto-Santa Rufina.

Upon returning to the Philippines in 2007, Ramirez joined the Saint John the Evangelist School of Theology in Palo as a professor and spiritual director. He became involved in various archdiocesan commissions, including the Lay Apostolate, the Archdiocesan Liturgical Commission, and the Presbyteral Council. In 2013, he was appointed rector of the Sacred Heart Seminary in Palo. By 2014, he had assumed the role of vicar general of the Archdiocese of Palo and rector of the Metropolitan Cathedral of Palo.

== Episcopal ministry ==
Pope Francis named Ramirez as the second bishop of Naval on October 13, 2017, following the retirement of Bishop Filomeno Bactol. His episcopal ordination was held on January 9, 2018 at the Palo Cathedral since roads in Naval was damaged by Tropical Storm Urduja last December 2017. His installation took place on January 12, 2018 at the Our Lady of the Most Holy Rosary Cathedral.

Since assuming leadership of the diocese, Ramirez has prioritized clergy formation, youth ministry, and social action programs. He has also focused on healthcare initiatives, leading the creation of a diocesan healthcare ministry to provide medical services to underserved communities during the COVID-19 pandemic in the Philippines.

He has been the chairman of the Episcopal Commission on Health Care of the Catholic Bishops' Conference of the Philippines (CBCP) from 2019 to 2025.

Catholic Church titles
Preceded by Filomeno Bactol	Bishop of Naval; 2018–present	Incumbent
