= Balangiga =

Municipality in Eastern Samar, Philippines

- Municipality
- Municipality of Balangiga
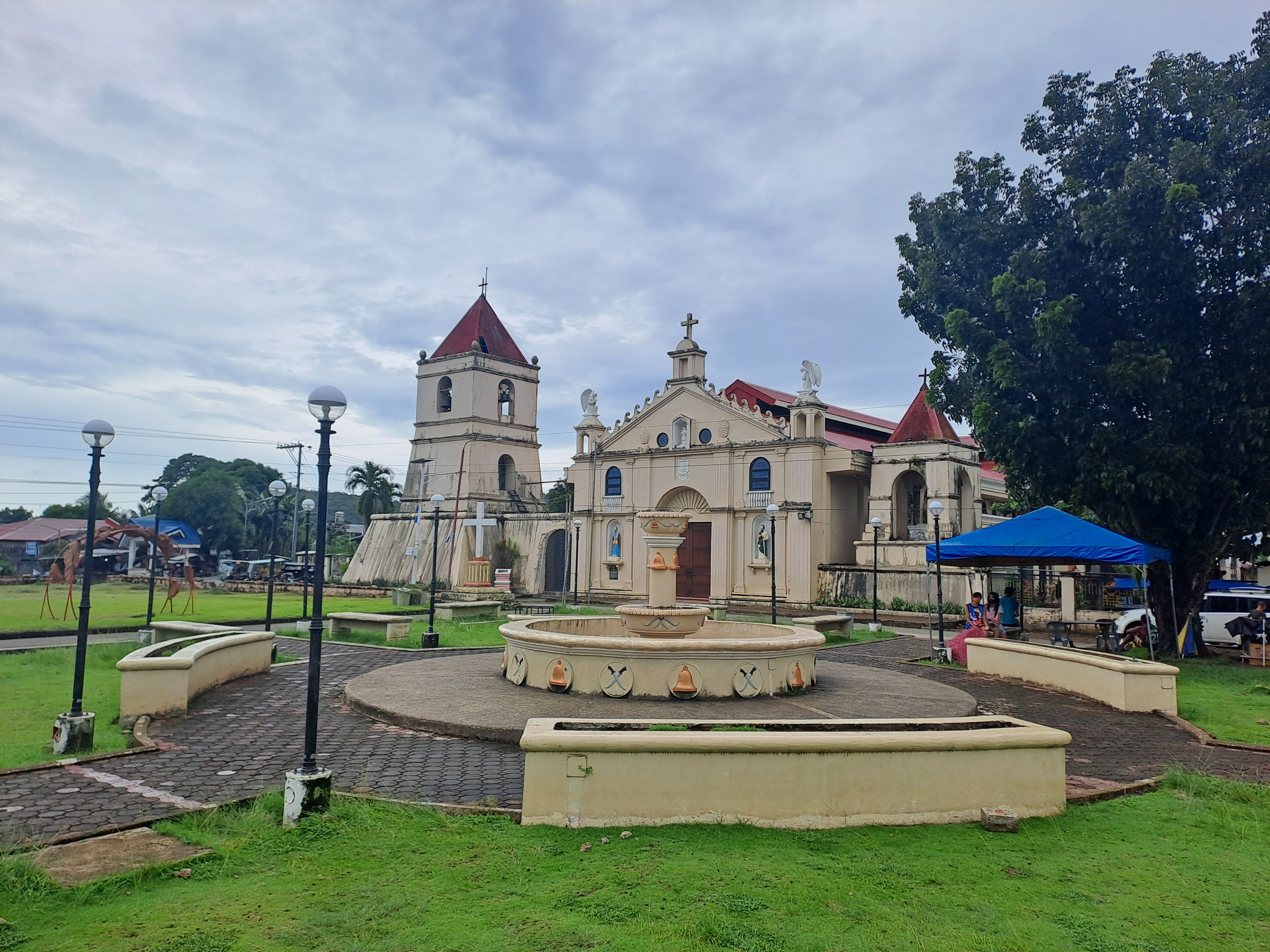
- Balangiga Church

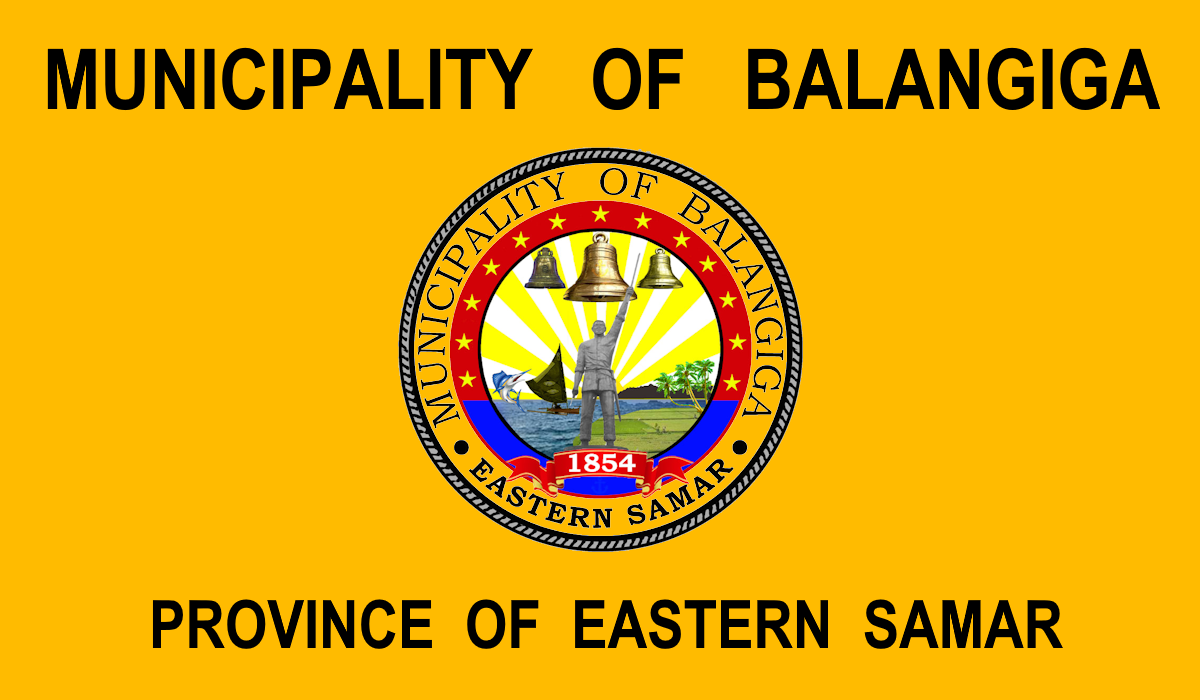
- Flag

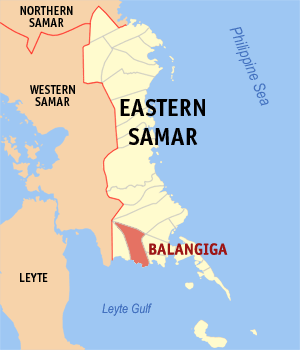
- Map of Eastern Samar with Balangiga highlighted
- Interactive map of Balangiga
- Location within the Philippines
- Coordinates: 11°06′33″N 125°23′11″E
- Country: Philippines
- Region: Eastern Visayas
- Province: Eastern Samar
- District: Lone district
- Barangays: 13 (see Barangays)

Government
  - Type: Sangguniang Bayan
  - Mayor: Atty. Dana Flynch R. de Lira
  - Vice Mayor: Arnel E. Calisay
  - Representative: Christopher Sheen P. Gonzales
  - Councilors: List: • Cherry Ann D. Diasanta; • Tommy B. Elacion; • Michael N. Calicoy; • Roque Zenas S. Canillas; • Orlando A. Tan; • Vince Nigel M. Alvarina; • Victorio E. Inciso, Jr.; • Marciano B. Deladia, Jr.
  - Electorate: 10,783 voters (2025)

Area
  - Total: 190.05 km^{2} (73.38 sq mi)
- Highest elevation: 281 m (922 ft)
- Lowest elevation: 0 m (0 ft)

Population (2024 census)
  - Total: 14,473
  - Density: 76.154/km^{2} (197.24/sq mi)
  - Households: 3,584

Economy
  - Income class: 3rd municipal income class
  - Poverty incidence: 31.2% (2023)
  - Revenue: ₱ 138.7 million (2024)
  - Assets: ₱ 483.3 million (2024)
  - Expenditure: ₱ 117.9 million (2024)
  - Liabilities: ₱ 175.1 million (2024)

Service provider
  - Electricity: Eastern Samar Electric Cooperative (ESAMELCO)
- Time zone: UTC+8 (PST)
- ZIP code: 6812
- PSGC: 0802602000
- IDD : area code: +63 (0)55
- Native languages: Waray; Tagalog
- Feast date: August 10
- Catholic diocese: Diocese of Borongan
- Patron saint: St. Lawrence Deacon & Martyr
- Website: www.balangiga-esamar.gov.ph

Balangiga (IPA: [ˌbalaŋˈhɪga]), officially the Municipality of Balangiga (Waray: Bungto han Balangiga; Tagalog: Bayan ng Balangiga), is a municipality in the province of Eastern Samar, Philippines. According to the 2024 census, it has a population of 14,473 people.

Balangiga is the site of the Balangiga Encounter in 1901, which remains one of the longest-running and most controversial issues of the Philippine–American War.

== History ==
=== Balangiga Encounter and Bells ===
During the Philippine-American War, on September 28, 1901, Eugenio Daza, Area Commander of Southeastern Samar and Valeriano Abanador, the Balangiga's pulahan chief, launched an attack on U.S. Army Company C 9th Infantry Regiment who were occupying Balangiga. With Philippine Revolutionary Army forces and Balangiga villagers, killing 48 and wounding 22 of the 78 men of the unit, with only four escaping unhurt and four missing in action. The villagers captured about 100 rifles and 25,000 rounds of ammunition. An estimated 20 to 25 of them died in the fighting, with a similar number of wounded.

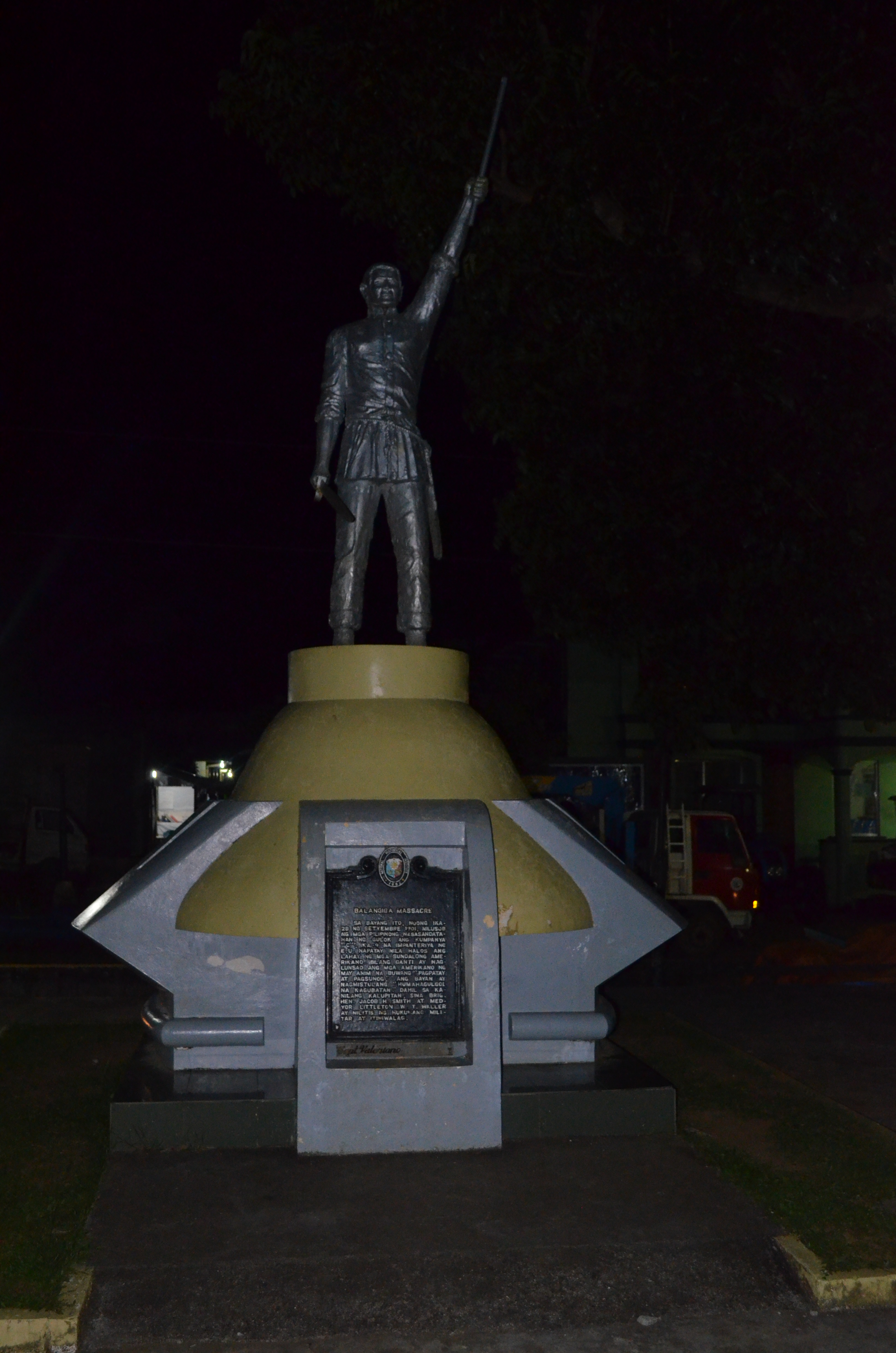
Statue and Historical Market of Valeriano Abanador, Balangiga.

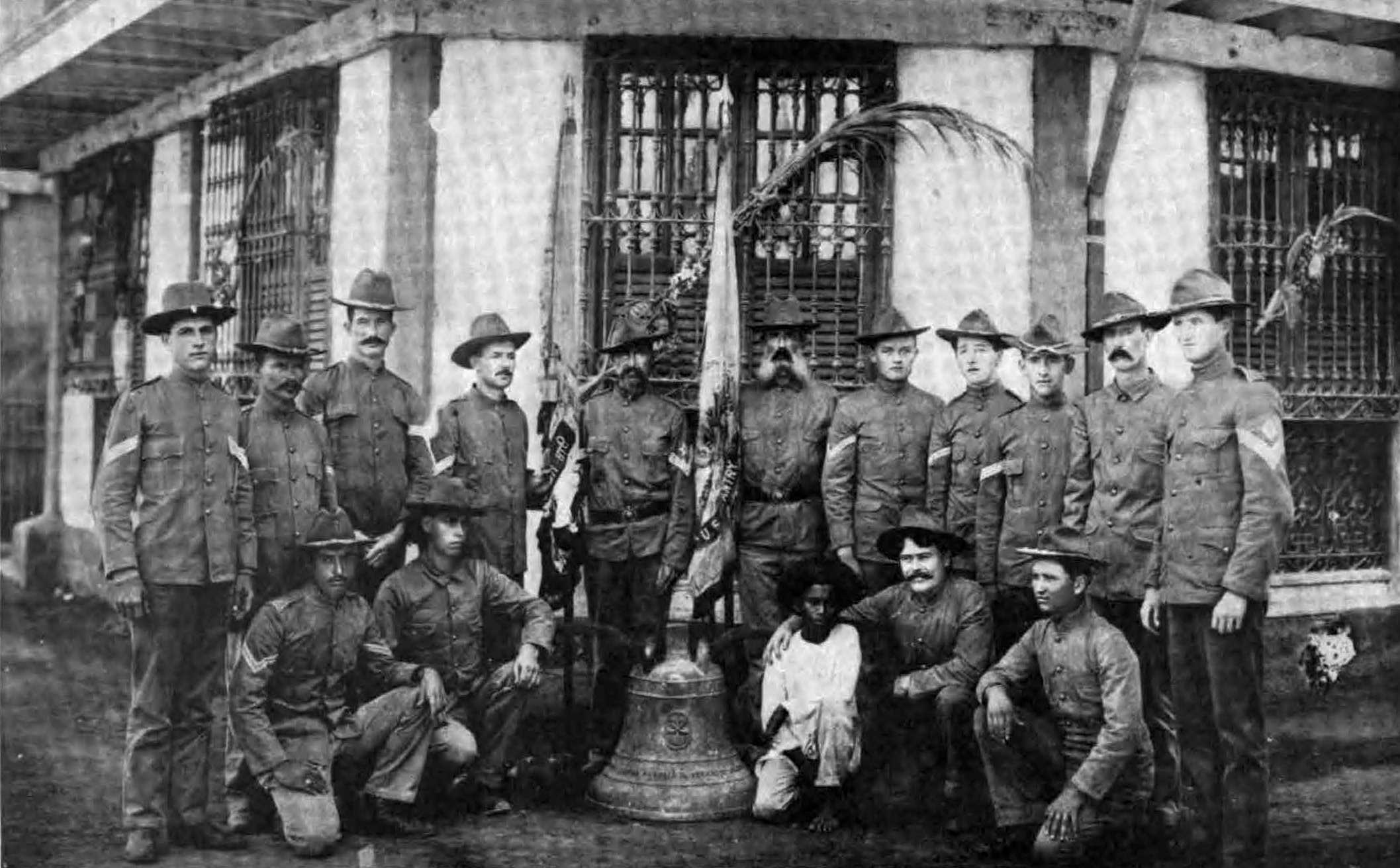
U.S. soldiers of Company C, 9th Infantry Regiment pose with one of the Balangiga bells seized as war trophy. Photo taken in Calbayog, Samar in April 1902.

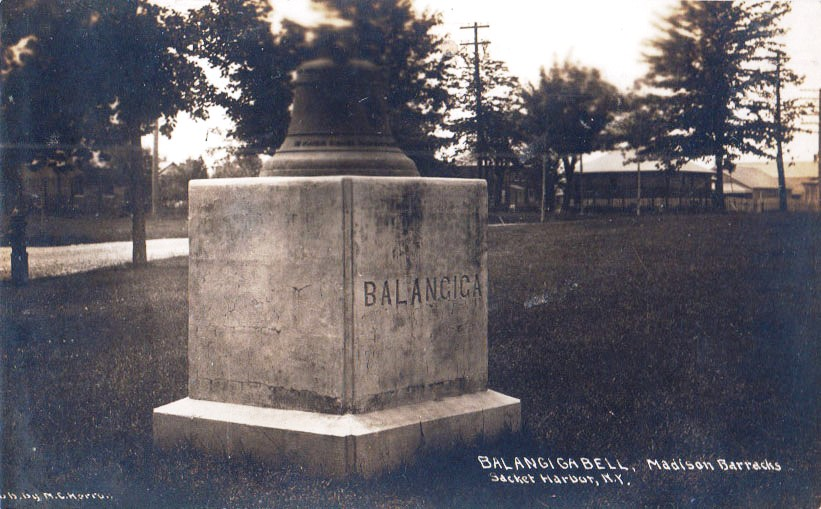
The signal bell displayed in the Madison Barracks at Sackets Harbor, New York station of the 9th US Infantry Regiment at the turn of the 20th century. This bell was later moved to Camp Red Cloud in Korea.

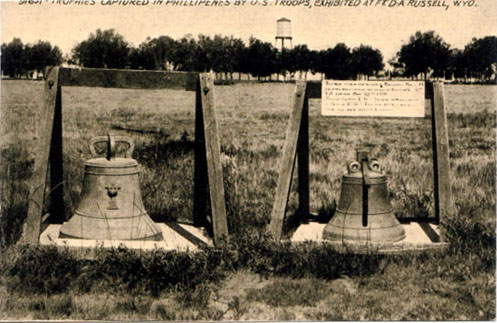
Two bells exhibited at Fort D.A. Russel (now Francis E. Warren Air Force Base) c. 1910

In reprisal, General Jacob H. Smith ordered that Samar be turned into a "howling wilderness" and that they shoot any Filipino male above ten years of age who was capable of bearing arms. The American soldiers seized three church bells including Bangahon Church bell of old Gandara and from the town church Balangiga and moved them home to the United States as war trophies. The 9th Infantry Regiment maintained that the single bell in their possession was presented to the regiment by villagers when the unit left Balangiga on 9 April 1902. The bell had been actually given to them by the 11th Infantry Regiment, which had taken all three bells when they left Balangiga for Tacloban on 18 October 1901.

Smith and his primary subordinate, Major Littleton Waller of the United States Marine Corps, were both court-martialled for illegal vengeance against the civilian population of Samar. Waller was acquitted of the charges. Smith was found guilty, admonished and retired from service, but charges were dropped shortly after. He was later hailed as a war hero.

The bells were returned on December 11, 2018.

== Geography ==
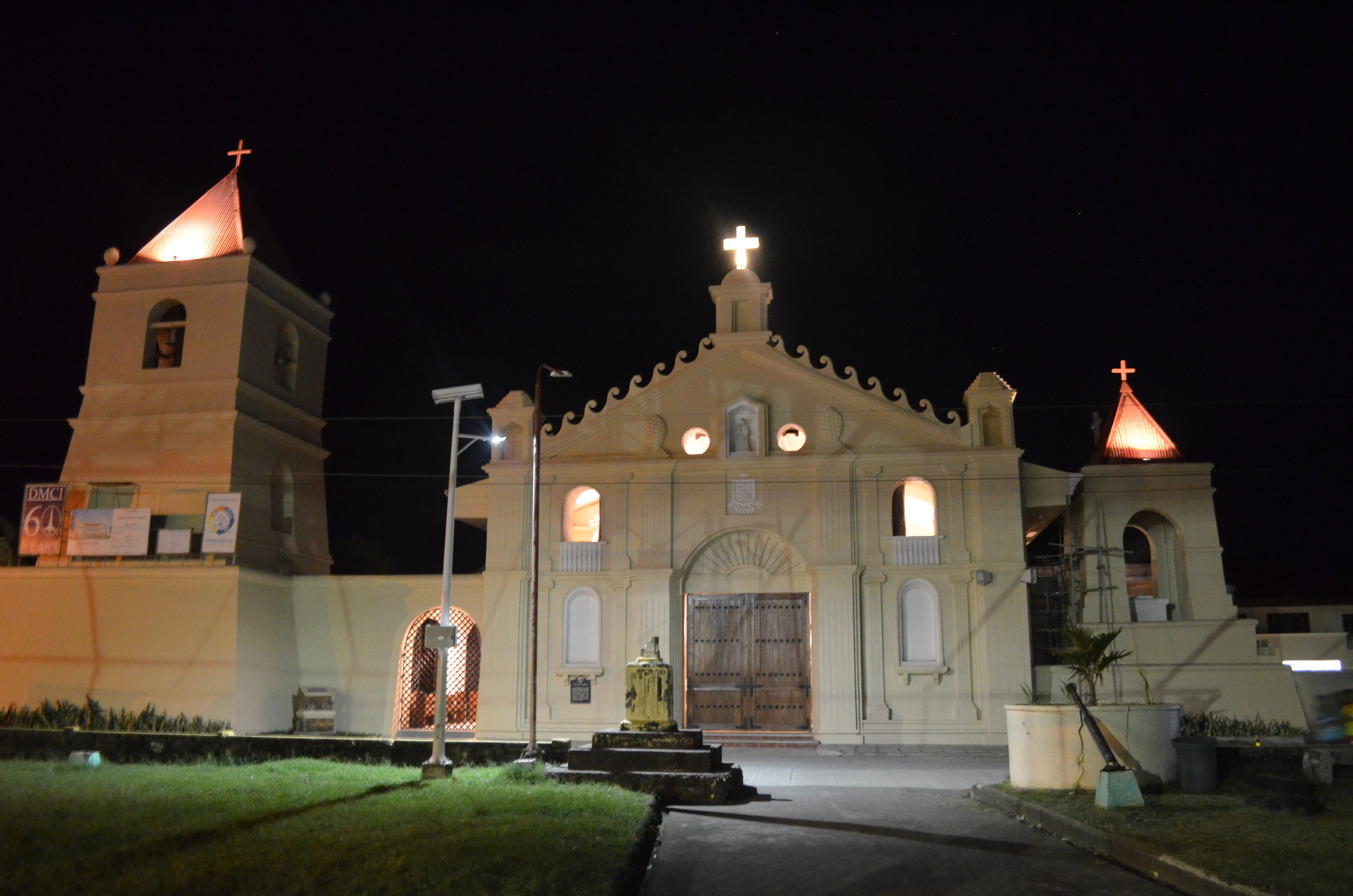
The Balangiga Church at night

Balangiga is located on the southern coast of the island of Samar facing Leyte Gulf, and sits at the mouth of the Balangiga River. To the west lies the municipality of Lawaan, to the north is Llorente, and to the east are the municipalities of Quinapondan and Giporlos.

=== Barangays ===
Balangiga is politically subdivided into 13 barangays. Each barangay consists of puroks and some have sitios.

- Bacjao
- Cag-olango
- Cansumangcay
- Guinmaayohan
- Poblacion I
- Poblacion II
- Poblacion III
- Poblacion IV
- Poblacion V
- Poblacion VI
- San Miguel
- Santa Rosa
- Maybunga

=== Climate ===
Climate data for Balangiga, Eastern Samar
Month	Jan	Feb	Mar	Apr	May	Jun	Jul	Aug	Sep	Oct	Nov	Dec	Year
Mean daily maximum °C (°F)	28 (82)	28 (82)	29 (84)	30 (86)	30 (86)	30 (86)	29 (84)	30 (86)	30 (86)	29 (84)	29 (84)	28 (82)	29 (84)
Mean daily minimum °C (°F)	22 (72)	22 (72)	22 (72)	23 (73)	24 (75)	24 (75)	24 (75)	24 (75)	24 (75)	24 (75)	23 (73)	23 (73)	23 (74)
Average precipitation mm (inches)	90 (3.5)	67 (2.6)	82 (3.2)	70 (2.8)	97 (3.8)	145 (5.7)	152 (6.0)	127 (5.0)	132 (5.2)	152 (6.0)	169 (6.7)	144 (5.7)	1,427 (56.2)
Average rainy days	17.0	13.5	16.0	16.5	20.6	24.3	26.0	25.4	25.2	26.4	23.0	21.1	255
Source: Meteoblue

== Demographics ==
Population census of Balangiga
Year	Pop.	±% p.a.
1903	4,914	—
1918	10,125	+4.94%
1939	19,858	+3.26%
1948	21,621	+0.95%
1960	8,215	−7.75%
1970	9,538	+1.50%
1975	8,474	−2.34%
1980	9,559	+2.44%
1990	9,565	+0.01%
1995	11,100	+2.83%
2000	10,662	−0.86%
2007	12,428	+2.14%
2010	12,756	+0.95%
2015	14,085	+1.91%
2020	14,341	+0.38%
2024	14,473	+0.22%
Source: Philippine Statistics Authority

In the 2024 census, the population of Balangiga was 14,473 people, with a density of 76 inhabitants per square kilometre or 200 inhabitants per square mile.

== Economy ==
Poverty incidence of Balangiga

Source: Philippine Statistics Authority

== Transportation ==
Balangiga can be reached through public utility vans and buses from Tacloban City. Pedicabs (potpot), tricycles, and habal-habal by the means of inner town transportation.

== Education ==
Balangiga has 9 public elementary schools, namely:

- Balangiga Central Elementary School
- Bacjao Elementary School
- Bangon Elementary School
- Cag-olango Elementary School
- Cansumangkay Elementary School
- Guinmaayohan Elementary School
- Maybunga Elementary School
- San Miguel Elementary School
- Santa Rosa Elementary School

Has 1 public secondary school:

- Southern Samar National Comprehensive High School

Has 1 private secondary school:

- MSH Sisters Academy Balangiga

Has 1 Public College:

- Eastern Samar State University - Balangiga Campus

== Daughter Towns ==
The municipalities of Lawaan, Giporlos, and Quinapondan were former barangays of the municipality of Balangiga.

== Notable personalities ==
- Valeriano Abanador – revolutionary, Balangiga massacre
- Donato Guimbaolibot – parish priest of San Lorenzo Martir Church
- Casiana Nacionales – revolutionary, Balangiga massacre
- Rex Ramirez – bishop of Naval

== See also ==
- Balangiga bells
