= Alangalang National High School =

Public high school in Leyte, Philippines

Coordinates: 11°12′17″N 124°51′02″E

Alangalang National High School is a high school in Alangalang municipality, Leyte province, Philippines, formerly known as Alangalang Municipal High School.

== Education Programs ==
There are two education programs available:

- Regular Education
- Special Science Class

== See also ==
- Palo National High School
