= Alangalang =

Municipality in Leyte, Philippines

- Municipality
- Municipality of Alangalang
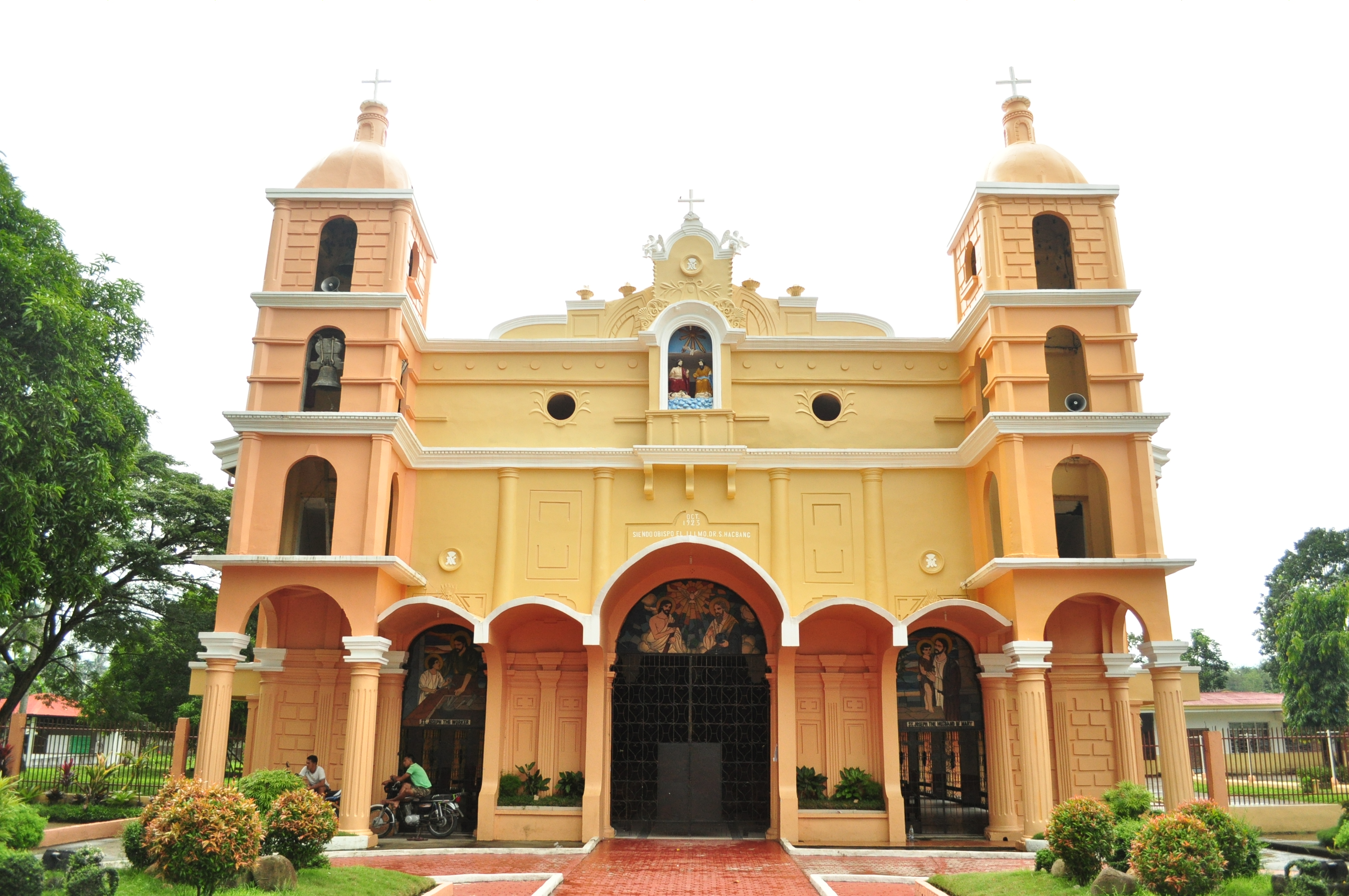
- Church of Alangalang

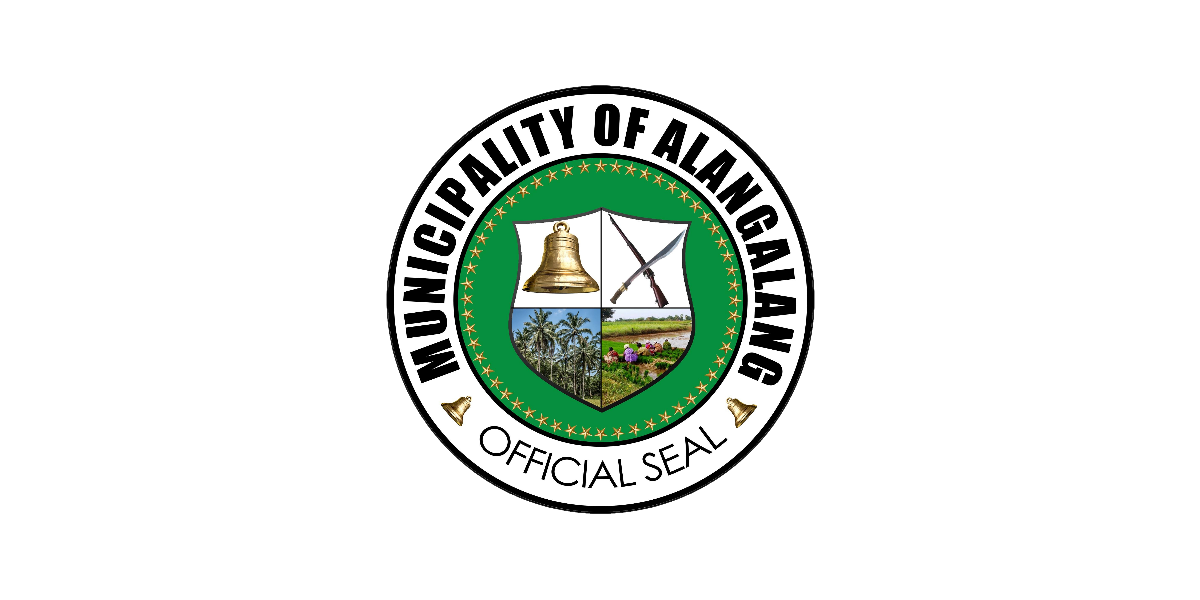
- Flag Seal
- Interactive map of Alangalang
- Location within the Philippines
- Coordinates: 11°12′22″N 124°50′52″E
- Country: Philippines
- Region: Eastern Visayas
- Province: Leyte
- District: 1st district
- Barangays: 54 (see Barangays)

Government
  - Type: Sangguniang Bayan
  - Mayor: Lovell Ann M. Yu - Castro (NPC)
  - Vice Mayor: Mario V. Bague (NPC)
  - Representative: Ferdinand Martin G. Romualdez (Lakas-CMD)
  - Councilors: List: • Kenneth Spice M. De Veyra; • Gina Balderamos; • Blesilda M. Yu; • Ketchie Rex A. Barrantes; • Elmer D. Matobato; • Claire G. Yu; • Kent Jefflord C. Guillermo; • Arvin A. Antoni; DILG Masterlist of Officials
  - Electorate: 39,332 voters (2025)

Area
  - Total: 150.54 km^{2} (58.12 sq mi)
- Highest elevation: 110 m (360 ft)
- Lowest elevation: 14 m (46 ft)

Population (2024 census)
  - Total: 59,063
  - Density: 392.34/km^{2} (1,016.2/sq mi)
  - Households: 14,479

Economy
  - Income class: 1st municipal income class
  - Poverty incidence: 28.85% (2023)
  - Revenue: ₱ 244.8 million (2024)
  - Assets: ₱ 696.4 million (2024)
  - Expenditure: ₱ 305.6 million (2024)
  - Liabilities: ₱ 268 million (2024)

Service provider
  - Electricity: Leyte 3 Electric Cooperative (LEYECO 3)
- Time zone: UTC+8 (PST)
- ZIP code: 6517
- PSGC: 0803702000
- IDD : area code: +63 (0)53
- Native languages: Waray; Tagalog
- Website: www.alangalangleyte.gov.ph

Alangalang (IPA: [ʔɐlɐŋ'ʔalɐŋ]), officially the Municipality of Alangalang (Waray: Bungto han Alangalang; Cebuano: Lungsod sa Alangalang; Tagalog: Bayan ng Alangalang), is a First Income Class municipality in the province of Leyte, Philippines. According to the 2024 census, it has a population of 59,063 people.

It is a landlocked town with an area of 151 km^{2}. It is bounded on the north by Barugo and San Miguel, on the south by Pastrana, on the north-east by Tacloban City, on the east by Santa Fe and on the west by Jaro.

On the way to Carigara is a steel bridge spanning the Mainit River. There was a time when only footpaths existed and the river was far too wide for a leap and too deep to wade in, travelers were undecided what to do. Hence the name Alangalang was given to the town, from the vernacular word alang-alang which means "indecision".

The Poblacion or town center was transferred twice. The first settlement was in a hilly place in Bukid, then down the hill across the Mainit River (now Brgy. Binongto-an). Those two earlier settlements were prone to flooding. A big flood in the year 1883 prompted another move in November that year to the present site. The last relocation in November 1883 is annually commemorated and re-enacted as "Bakwit".

The strongest tropical Typhoon Haiyan, more commonly known as Typhoon Yolanda impacted the town on November 8, 2013.

== Etymology ==
The place got its name from the word Alang-alang, a vernacular word for indecision. There was a time when only footpaths existed in Mainit river going to Carigara which was too wide to leap and too narrow to wade in, so travelers were undecided on what to do.

== History ==
=== Spanish Period ===
The town began to form from different "rancherías" and "barangays" at about the year 1596, Fr. Cosme de Flores, a priest-engineer, made it into the fourth "doctrina." Fr. Tomas de Montaya, a Manila college professor succeeded Fr. Flores who died at the early age of 29. Alangalang, with Dulag, was made a "cabecera" of nine towns with Fr. Mateo Sanchez as superior.

In 1600, the town suffered from the Moro raids. A punitive force from Cebu under Capitan Francisco de Pedraza was sent to suppress lawlessness. In 1611, a typhoon swept the whole town and floods became frequent. The 18 or 20 rancherias declined in importance and around December 1628, Alangalang became a "visita" of Barugo.

The old town of Alangalang was founded in 1748 (referred to as "Alagalng" in the first Murillo-Velarde Map published more than a decade earlier in 1734) in a site located across the steel bridge at Binongto-an called Bukid Height. This settlement was headed by Francisco Antonis, a courageous leader, together with Pongal, Manamot, Francisco Gariando, Hidalgo Pedrera and Solang Adlao. Antonis was famed for having eaten the liver of a Moro bandit whom he caught during one of the raids. Fr. Baysa, a Franciscan, was then their spiritual mentor. The objective of the Moro raids was the gold church bell. During every Moro attack, the inhabitants would take the gold bell with them to the hills. At one time, when the townsfolk were being pursued, they had to drop the gold bell in the Bangka River only to save it from the invaders, the bell has never been recovered since then.

Alangalang was made into a parish in 1809 according to a historian named Cousin. Towards the end of the 18th century, the settlement in Bukid thrived that Fr. Jose Olmo, then Parish priest, transferred the town across the Mainit River where the provincial nursery is located up to this day. The government officials at that time were the gobernadorcillo, teniente mayor, teniente segundo, cabeza de la barangay or guinhaopan, delgado de las rentas and cuadrilleros. Among the lay leaders were Eulogio Barrantes, Santo Pabilona, Eulogio Daroles and Esteban Pedero. A big flood leveled the town in 1883 and by November of the same year, the gobernadorcillo moved the town to its present site.

By the middle of the 19th century, Alangalang had a rectory and six rural schools; the roads to Palo and Barugo were also opened. The town was noted for its abacá, copra, seeds of "kabalonga", wax, cocoa, tobacco and rice.

=== Spanish Overthrow / American Period ===
In 1892, when there was a rebellion in the country, Alangalang was in the middle of the fight. Leocardio Pabilona overthrew the Spanish rule in the town and became the jefe or capitán with a new set of guinhaopan. When the Americans occupied the town upon orders from Pabilona, the inhabitants evacuated the place. The Americans, angered, set the town on fire. It was the hardship of mountain life which finally made the townsfolk yield to American authority.

From then on, the town's growth was steady. Alangalang is a big producer of copra and rice and lies along the route of the busiest national highway of the province. The town has one of the biggest Spanish-made churches and shortly before the war had a new concrete municipal building with a swimming pool.

==== Burning of Alangalang during 1900 ====
On May 17, 1900, the American forces stationed at Jaro burned the town. Town President Franciso Astorga sued the United States Government for $12,973 for his house and properties but was only reimbursed for $6,500 Mexican currency.

==== Consolidation of San Miguel into Alangalang ====
In 1903, the municipality of San Miguel was consolidated into Alangalang but was subsequently reversed by the Governor General in 1909 through Executive Order 81.

=== World War II ===
After the fall of Corregidor in May 1942, the municipality became the emergency capital of the province. Provincial and national offices and government records were accordingly transferred there for safekeeping. On December 16, 1942, Japanese planes bombed the town. In August 1943, the town was attacked by the Japanese to weaken guerilla strength. Alangalang again became one of the bulwarks of the resistance movement with Filemon Pabilona and Elias Macina as leaders. In 1944 to 1945, the Filipino forces of the 4th, 9th, 92nd, 93rd and 95th Infantry Division of the Philippine Commonwealth Army took in the town in Alangalang, Leyte fought the battles against the Japanese forces in World War II.

==== Mainit River Bridge Incident ====
On Oct 28, 1944, Lt. Col. Thomas E. Clifford Jr.'s troops made contact with the Japanese at the Mainit Bridge where he lost 5 men. The bridge was already fitted with explosives by the enemy but due to quick advance of the American troops, the enemy didn't have the chance to set it off.

== Geography ==
=== Barangays ===
Alangalang is politically subdivided into 54 barangays. Each barangay consists of puroks and some have sitios.

- Aslum
- Astorga (Burabod)
- Bato
- Binongtoan
- Binotong
- Blumentrit (Poblacion)
- Bobonon
- Borseth
- Buenavista
- Bugho
- Buri
- Cabadsan
- Calaasan
- Cambahanon
- Cambolao
- Canvertudes
- Capiz
- Cavite
- Cogon
- Dapdap
- Divisoria
- Ekiran
- Hinapolon (Baras)
- Holy Child I (Poblacion)
- Holy Child II (Poblacion)
- Hubang
- Hupit
- Langit
- Lingayon
- Lourdes
- Lukay
- Magsaysay
- Milagrosa (Poblacion)
- Mudboron
- P. Barrantes
- Peñalosa
- Pepita
- Salvacion
- Salvacion (Poblacion)
- San Antonio
- San Antonio (Poblacion)
- San Diego
- San Francisco East (Francia)
- San Francisco West
- San Isidro
- San Pedro
- San Roque (Poblacion)
- San Vicente
- Santiago
- Santo Niño (Poblacion)
- Santol
- Tabangohay
- Tombo
- Veteranos

=== Climate ===
Climate data for Alangalang, Leyte
Month	Jan	Feb	Mar	Apr	May	Jun	Jul	Aug	Sep	Oct	Nov	Dec	Year
Mean daily maximum °C (°F)	28 (82)	28 (82)	29 (84)	30 (86)	31 (88)	30 (86)	29 (84)	29 (84)	29 (84)	29 (84)	29 (84)	28 (82)	29 (84)
Mean daily minimum °C (°F)	22 (72)	22 (72)	22 (72)	23 (73)	24 (75)	25 (77)	24 (75)	25 (77)	24 (75)	24 (75)	23 (73)	23 (73)	23 (74)
Average precipitation mm (inches)	73 (2.9)	56 (2.2)	75 (3.0)	71 (2.8)	114 (4.5)	174 (6.9)	172 (6.8)	163 (6.4)	167 (6.6)	161 (6.3)	158 (6.2)	125 (4.9)	1,509 (59.5)
Average rainy days	15.2	14.1	16.2	17.3	23.9	27.3	28.4	26.9	26.9	27.1	23.8	19.3	266.4
Source: Meteoblue

== Demographics ==
Population census of Alangalang
Year	Pop.	±% p.a.
1903	9,358	—
1918	16,347	+3.79%
1939	21,084	+1.22%
1948	19,972	−0.60%
1960	22,448	+0.98%
1970	25,223	+1.17%
1975	27,135	+1.48%
1980	29,453	+1.65%
1990	33,375	+1.26%
1995	38,853	+2.89%
2000	41,245	+1.29%
2007	43,691	+0.80%
2010	46,411	+2.22%
2015	55,235	+3.37%
2020	57,185	+0.73%
2024	59,063	+0.78%
Source: Philippine Statistics Authority

In the 2024 census, the population of Alangalang was 59,063 people, with a density of 390 inhabitants per square kilometre or 1,000 inhabitants per square mile.

== Economy ==
Poverty incidence of Alangalang (%)

Source: Philippine Statistics Authority

The town was classified as a 3rd class municipality in 1950 then 2nd class in 1954 up to 2021. By 2025, it attained First Class status

== Education ==
There are a total of 49 Elementary Schools, 9 High Schools and 1 University in Alangalang

=== Elementary/Grade School ===
- Alangalang I Central School
- Andres C. Yu, Sr. Memorial School
- Aslum Elementary School
- Astorga Elementary School
- Bato Primary School
- Binongtoan Central School
- Borseth Elementary School
- Buenavista Elementary School
- Bugho Elementary School
- Cabadsan Primary School
- Calaasan Elementary School
- Cambahanon Primary School
- Cambulao Primary School
- Canvertudes Primary School
- Capiz Elementary School
- Cavite Primary School
- Cogon Elementary School
- Dapdap Elementary School
- Divisoria Primary School
- Hinapolon Primary School
- Hubang Elementary School
- Hupit Elementary School
- Langit Elementary School
- Lingayon Central School
- Lourdes Elementary School
- Lukay Elementary School
- M. Casaus Elementary School
- Mariquita Cinco Memorial Primary School
- Montaño Elementary School
- Mudboron Elementary School
- P. Barrantes Primary School
- Penalosa Elementary School
- Pepita Elementary School
- Salazar Elementary School
- Salvacion Elementary School
- San Antonio Elementary School
- San Diego Elementary School
- San Francisco East Primary School
- San Francisco West Elementary School
- San Isidro Elementary School
- San Pedro Primary School
- San Vicente Elementary School
- Santiago Primary School
- Santol Elementary School
- Tabangohay Elementary School
- Tinaisan Elementary School
- Tombo Elementary School
- Veteranos Elementary School

=== High School/Secondary ===
- Alangalang National High School
- Astorga National High School
- Alangalang Night High School
- Alangalang Agro Industrial School
- Borseth National High School
- Ana G. Yu National High School (in Brgy. Ekiran)
- Holy Trinity College
- Mariano Salazar National High School (in Brgy. Cabadsan)
- Trinidad Caidic National High School (in Brgy. San Diego)

=== College/Universities ===
- Visayas State University - Alangalang Campus

== Elected Officials ==
2025-2028 Alangalang, Leyte Officials
Position	Name	Party
Mayor	Lovell Ann M. Yu-Castro	NPC
Vice Mayor	Mario V. Bague	NPC
Councilors	Kenneth Spice M. De Veyra	Lakas
Councilors	Gina Balderamos	Tingog
Councilors	Blesilda M. Yu	NPC
Councilors	Ketchie Rex A. Barrantes	NPC
Councilors	Elmer D. Matobato	Lakas
Councilors	Claire G. Yu	NPC
Councilors	Kent Jefflord C. Guillermo	Tingog
Councilors	Arvin A. Antoni	KANP
Ex Officio Municipal Council Members
ABC President	Sarah T. Apurillo	Nonpartisan
SK Federation President	Charlze Jericho Duane A. Tan	Nonpartisan

== Alangalang during COVID-19 Pandemic ==
Like most parts of the world, Alangalang was hit by the COVID-19 pandemic. A town councilor from nearby town of Leyte, Leyte tested positive after attending a party in Alangalang. Part of the town was locked-down and then a month later put up online service to mitigate spread of infections. The Mayor also tested positive.

== See also ==
- List of reduplicated place names
