= Palo Cathedral =

Roman Catholic church in Leyte, Philippines

- Metropolitan Cathedral of Our Lord's Transfiguration
- Transfiguration of Our Lord's Cathedral; Palo Metropolitan Cathedral
- Catedral de la Transfiguración de Nuestro Señor (Spanish)
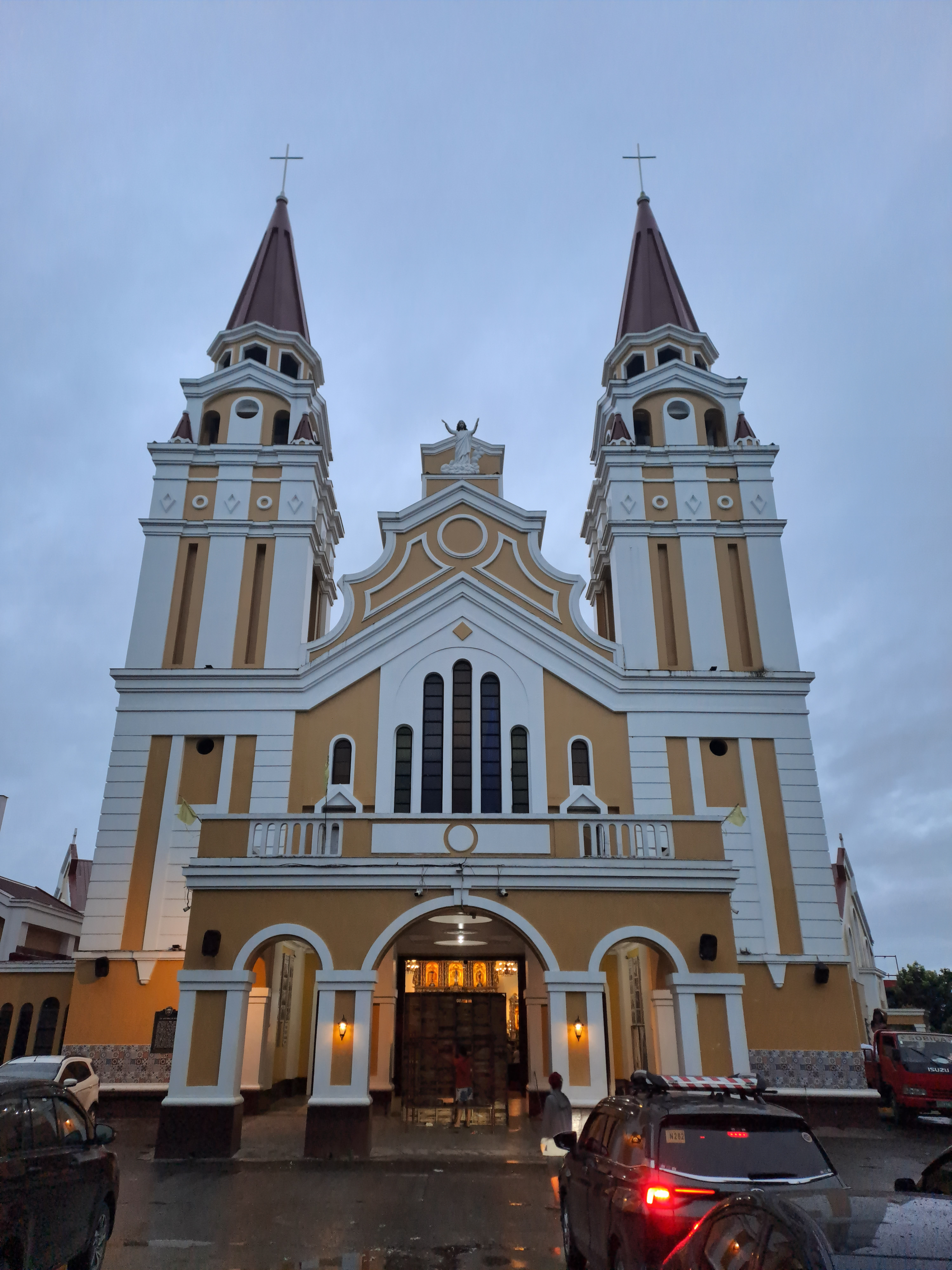
- Cathedral facade in 2023

- Location in the Visayas Location in the Philippines
- 11°09′34″N 124°59′29.6″E
- Location: Palo, Leyte
- Country: Philippines
- Denomination: Roman Catholic

History
- Status: Cathedral
- Founded: 1596
- Founder: Cristobal Jimenez, S.J. Francisco Encinas, S.J.
- Dedication: Transfiguration of Jesus

Architecture
- Architectural type: Church building

Specifications
- Capacity: 1,200

Administration
- Archdiocese: Palo
- Deanery: Palo

Clergy
- Archbishop: John F. Du
- Rector: Rodolfo P. Barro

The Metropolitan Cathedral of Our Lord's Transfiguration, also known as Transfiguration of Our Lord's Cathedral or simply Palo Cathedral, is a Roman Catholic church located at Palo, Leyte, in the Philippines belonging to the Vicariate of Palo under the Metropolitan Archdiocese of Palo.

== History ==
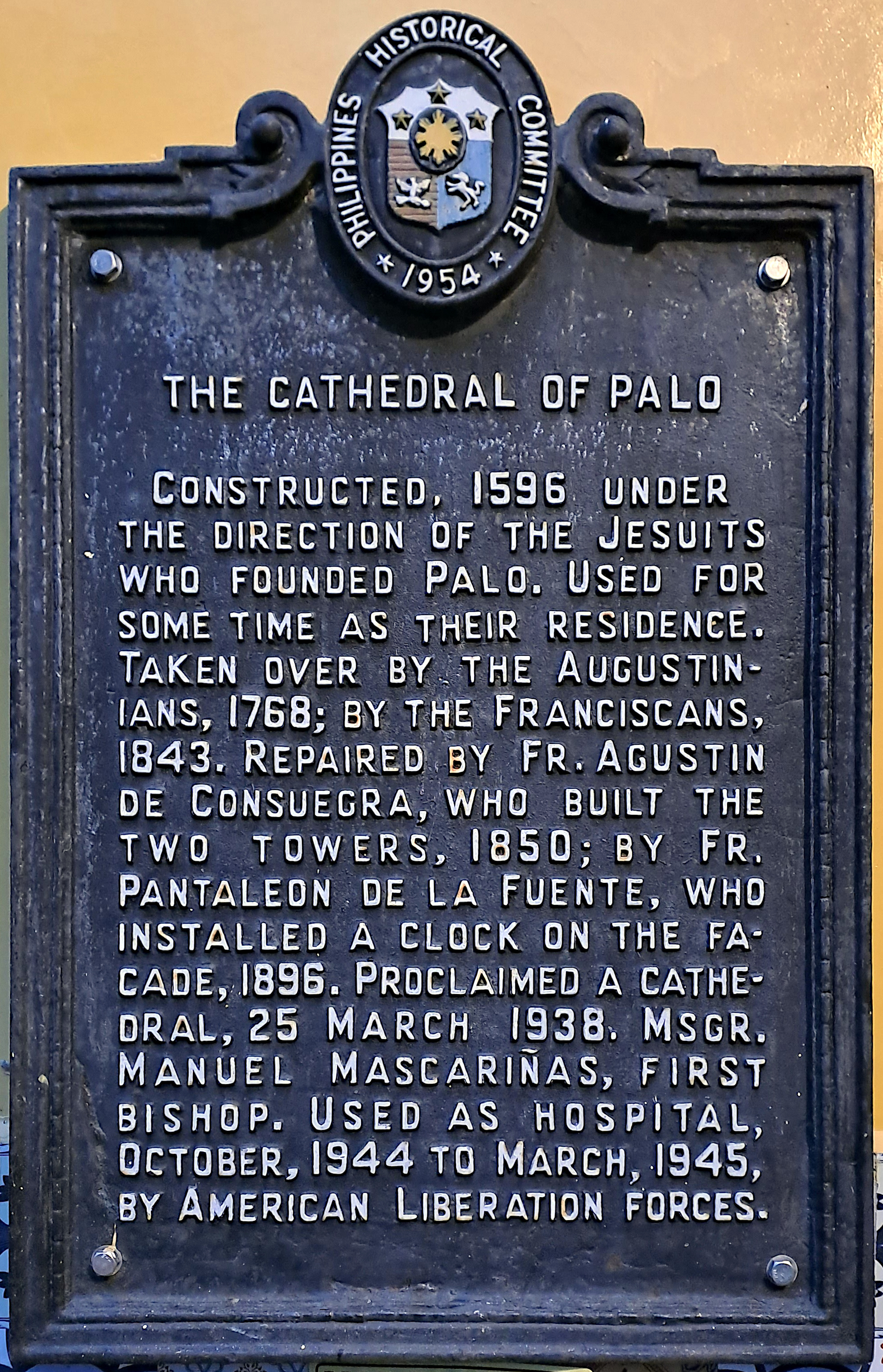
Church PHC historical marker installed in 1954

=== The beginnings of the Jesuit ministry ===
In October 1596 two Jesuits, Fr. Cristobal Jimenez, S.J., and Fr. Francisco Encinas, S.J., travelled from Dulag to Palo along the eastern coasts, accompanied by the leading principales, Don Alonso Ambuyao and four others.

The group arrived at the Bunga River (now the present river of San Joaquin) and entered Ambuyao's house. On the following day, they reached the settlement of Kutay (now, the present site of Palo town proper) on the bank of the Bangon River. Upon the arrival, the settlement was greatly reduced in population because of a smallpox outbreak.

In 1598, the first church of Palo was built by Fr Jimenez. It was inaugurated on August 15, the feast of the Assumption, one of the most important feasts or devotions by the Jesuit Order, thus dedicating the church to Our Lady. During that time Fr. Jimenez also solemnized the baptism of a local chieftain named Datu Kanganga of Malirong, whom he baptized as Don Juan Kanganga, and who was appointed as the petty governor of Palo by the Spanish government.

By November 1599, Fr. Diego Garcia, S.J. (who was commissioned by Rome to make a visitation of the Philippine Vice-Province) arrived in Tinago, Samar, and proceeded to the mission-stations in Leyte, which led to a Jesuit conference of both island-provinces in Palo. Twenty-six Jesuits attended the conference, which began on January 6, 1600. The result of the conference was reducing the many provinces into three: Carigara, Dulag and Alangalang.

In the beginning, Palo was a visita under the Jesuit Residence of Dulag. In 1613, after the raid of the Joloan invaders, the residencia was transferred to Dagami. It has given the jurisdictions over the missions of Malaguicay (now, Tanauan), Malirong (now, Brgy. Libertad, a present barangay of Palo) and Banayon, including Palo.

Years later, Palo would become the seat of the Jesuit central residence because of its strategic location. Jesuit reports would reveal that the Jesuit central residence was already in Palo by the 1700s but was officially named only to Dagami. It remained under the administration of the Jesuits until their expulsion in 1768.

The following are the Jesuit missionaries who have served Palo beginning at the time when an operarius (a priest in-charge) was assigned:

- 1695-1698: Rev. Fr. Pedro Vello, S.J.
- 1698-1714: Rev. Fr. Mauricio Pereira, S.J.
- 1714-1721: Rev. Fr. Pedro Farriz, S.J.
- 1721-1725: Rev. Fr. Gregorio Miguel Tabora, S.J.
- 1725-1728: Rev. Fr. Martin Gil, S.J.
- 1728-1732: Rev. Fr. Pedro Estrada, S.J.
- 1732-1735: Rev. Fr. Bartolommeo Lugo, S.J.
- 1735-1739: Rev. Fr. Juan de Eguia, S.J.
- 1739-1744: Rev. Fr. Emmanuel Herrero, S.J.
- 1744-1748: Rev. Fr. Francisco Martinez, S.J.
- 1748-1749: Rev. Fr. Angelo Brescia, S.J.
- 1749-1754: Rev. Fr. Bartolommeo Lugo, S.J.
- 1754-1762: Rev. Fr. Roque Corbino, S.J.
- 1762-1768: Rev. Fr. Ignatz Frisch, S.J.
- 1768-1768: Rev. Fr. Juan Miguel dela Cuesta, S.J.

=== The Augustinian years ===
In 1768, the Jesuit in Samar, Leyte and other islands in the Visayas were expelled by King Charles III of Spain by virtue of the royal order called the pragmatic sanction. The pope also declared his bull of expulsion. (See Suppression of the Society of Jesus).

Palo came under the administration of the Augustinian friars, who inherited the stone church built by the Jesuits. The first Augustinian friar who arrived in Palo was Fray Matias Rosel, O.S.A., who came from Andalusia, Spain. The Augustinian Fray Agustin Maria de Castro, O.S.A., described the pueblo of Palo as having six hundred tribute payers. The church is beautiful and very furnished with carved silver and ornaments and is dedicated to La Transfiguracion del Senor Jesucristo. It has also a good house (convent) and surrounded stone wall prepared with good weaponries. He also said that the town has much wine (tuba) and coconut oil. The townspeople raised many pigs and chickens, and they trade in the sea.

Some of the priests who have served the Parish of Palo during the Augustinian times were;

- R. P. Fray Matias Rosel, O.S.A. in 1768
- R. P. Fray Ignacio Callazo, O.S.A. in 1774
- R. P. Fray Lorenzo Molina, O.S.A. in 1788
- R. P. Fray Andres Carpintero, O.S.A. in 1796

Due to the scarcity of the Augustinian friars, the church was given temporarily under the administration of the secular clergy of the Diocese of Cebu.

- Presbitero Don Apolinario Damian (1804-1808)
- Presbitero Don Adriano del Castillo (1808-1826)
- Presbitero Don Ignacio del Castillo (1826-1843)
- Presbitero Don Francisco Paula de Villasis (1843-1844)

=== The coming of the Franciscans ===
In 1843, the Augustinians bequeathed the parish church of Palo to the Franciscans through a royal decree dated October 29, 1837. The first Franciscan parish priest who was assigned to Palo was Fray Baldomero Baena, O.F.M.

It was said that the Church of Palo was visited by Monsignor Martin Alcocer y Garcia, O.F.M, then Bishop of Cebu, in 1892 to solemnize confirmation rites for the parishioners. Whenever he came, all the streets of the town were carpeted with bright colored tikug mats spread on the streets for his feet to tread upon, as he alighted from the carriage that bore him from Tacloban to the Palo bridge.

Some of the priests who have served the parish church of Palo during the time of the Franciscan friars were

- Presbitero Don Francisco Paula de Villasis (cuadjutor, 1844-1845)
- 1844-1847 R. P. Fray Baldomero Baena, O.F.M.
- 1847-1857 R. P. Fray Agustin de Consuegra, O.F.M.
- 1857-1858 Presbitero Don Leon Continelever (secular clergy)
- 1858-1861 R. P. Fray Leon Tellez de Temblegue, O.F.M.
- 1861-1879 R. P. Fray Juan Perez, O.F.M.
- 1879-1879 Presbitero Don Isidro Aquino y Gomez (secular clergy)
- 1879-1882 R. P. Fray Florentino Garcia, O.F.M.
- 1882-1885 R. P. Fray Sebastian de Almonacid, O.F.M.
- 1885-1886 R. P. Fray Pedro Ruiz, O.F.M.
- 1886-1887 R. P. Fray Gil Martinez, O.F.M.
- 1887-1898 R. P. Fray Pantaleon de la Fuente, O.F.M.

=== The hermanidad and devotion to Señor Salvador ===
Since the Jesuit times, the patron of Palo is Señor San Salvador - The Transfigured Christ. During the time of the Augustinians, a hermanidad society was formed with the secular parish priest at that time, Fr. Ignacio del Castillo, serving as the first Hermano Mayor in 1830. He was later succeeded by the following hermanos;

- Don Wenceslao Estopa (1844-1850)
- Don Gregorio Moraleda (1851-1856)
- Don Paulino Montejo (1857-1861)
- Don Manuel Mora (1880-1885)
- Don Anastacio Acebedo (1886-1893)
- Don Alejandro Flores (1894-1900) and others.

=== A period of transition ===
In 1898, the first Philippine Republic was proclaimed in Kawit, Cavite. The Spaniards and the Spanish-friars were requested to leave the country and give the parishes to the secular Filipino priests.

General Emilio Aguinaldo appointed General Ambrosio Mojica, a Caviteño, as politico-military governor of the province of Leyte. In 1899, for the second time, Palo was created as the capital seat and of politico-military government of General Mojica. Presbitero Don Fabian Avelino succeeded Fray Pantaleon de la Fuente, O.F.M.

=== An era of the church's secularization ===
After Fr. Agustin Medalle's tenure as parish priest, the parochial administration of the church was passed down to Juan Pacoli, a native of Paranas, Samar. He would later become the longest-serving parish priest of Palo (1899-1938). He managed the transition of the administration of the church from the Franciscan friars to the secular clergy of the Diocese of Cebu.

When the Diocese of Calbayog was created in 1910. the Church of Palo became the scene of two diocesan synods in 1911 when it was convoked by Msgr. Pablo Singzon de la Annunciacion, the first Bishop of Calbayog, and in 1935 during the time of Bishop Sofronio Hacbang. Also during that year, Ambrose Agius, O.S.B., who was then the Apostolic Delegate to the Philippines and the representative of the pope, visited the church of Palo. Later, Archbishop Giuseppe Petrelli, another Apostolic Delegate to the Philippines, also came to visit the parish.

In 1926, the large rectory served as the first apostolic and minor seminary under Fr. Consorcio Poblete, a native of Gandara, Samar.

On June 27, 1927, Archbishop Guglielmo Piani, S.D.B., visited the church of Palo, and later, American Archbishop of Manila, Michael O'Doherty.

Here are the following diocesan secular clergy who have served the parish Church of Palo from the period of the transition from 1898 to the present:

=== The parish priests of Palo (1898-present) ===
- 1898-1899: Rev. Fr. Fabian Avelino
- 1899-1899: Rev. Fr.Agustin Medalle
- 1899-1938: Rev. Fr. Juan Pacoli
- 1938-1939: Rev. Fr. Zenon Ocampo
- 1939-1946: Rev. Msgr. Lino R. Gonzaga
- 1946-1949: Rev. Msgr. Lesmes Ricalde
- 1949-1950: Rev. Msgr. Lino R. Gonzaga
- 1950-1951: Rev. Msgr. Zenon Ocampo
- 1951-1952: Rev. Fr. Climaco Faelnar
- 1952-1960: Rev. Fr. Zenon Ocampo
- 1960-1962: Rev. Msgr. Cipriano V. Urgel
- 1962-1962: Rev. Fr. Aluino Estalilia
- 1962-1968: Rev. Msgr. Estanislao Abarca
- 1968-1971: Rev. Msgr. Felimon Quiazon
- 1971-1974: Rev. Fr. Bartolome "Bart" Pastor
- 1974-1977: Rev. Msgr. Estanislao A. Abarca, P.A.
- 1977-1987: Rev. Msgr. Leonardo Y. Medroso (appointed, Bishop of Borongan in 1987)
- 1987-1989: Rev. Msgr. Estanislao A. Abarca, P.A.
- 1989-1994: Rev. Msgr. Pastor E. Cotiangco, P.C.
- 1994-2001: Rev. Msgr. Benidicto B. Catilogo, P.C.
- 2001-2004: Rev. Fr. Stephen R. Pesado
- 2004-2007: Rev. Msgr. Benjamin M. Bacierra, P.A., S.Th.D.
- 2007-2010: Rev. Msgr. Ramon Stephen B. Aguilos, P.C., S.Th.D., M.S.E.M.
- 2010-2014: Rev. Msgr. Bernardo R. Pantin, P.C., J.C.D. (appointed CBCP Secretary General in 2014.)
- 2014-2017: Rev. Msgr. Rex Cullingham Ramirez, S.L.L. (appointed Bishop of Naval in 2017 by Pope Francis)
- 2017-2021: Rev. Fr. Gilbert G. Urbina, S.Th.D., S.L.L. (appointed Vicar General in 2021)
- 2021–present: Rev. Fr. Rodolfo P. Barro

=== From pueblo to sede ===
On November 28, 1937, Palo was separated from its mother diocese, Calbayog and was elevated into a separate diocese comprising the whole province of Leyte by virtue of apostolic decree Si Qua in Urbe issued by Pope Pius XI. On March 25, 1938, the church was declared a cathedral, and Msgr. Manuel Mascariñas became its first bishop.

=== World War II and post-war period ===
The Pacific War in the Philippines began on December 8, 1941, when Japanese Forces started bombing Manila. Later, they arrived and occupied Leyte. When the American army liberated Leyte Island through the Battle of Leyte Gulf, the cathedral of Palo was used by the Americans as a hospital for war casualties from October 20, 1944, to March 7, 1945.

The Philippine Historical Committee designated Palo Cathedral as a heritage zone/ historical center in 1954. After the war, Bishop Lino Gonzaga decided to expand and renovate the cathedral because of the town's growing population. The work of the modern cathedral started in the 1960s and continued until the celebration of the diamond jubilee of Palo as a diocese in 2012.

=== The new Metropolitan Archdiocese ===
On November 15, 1982, the Diocese of Palo was made into a metropolitan archdiocese with four suffragan dioceses: the Dioceses of Catarman, Calbayog, Borongan and Maasin.

The Diocese of Maasin was erected on March 23, 1968, while the Diocese of Naval was made on November 29, 1988.

=== Contemporary ===
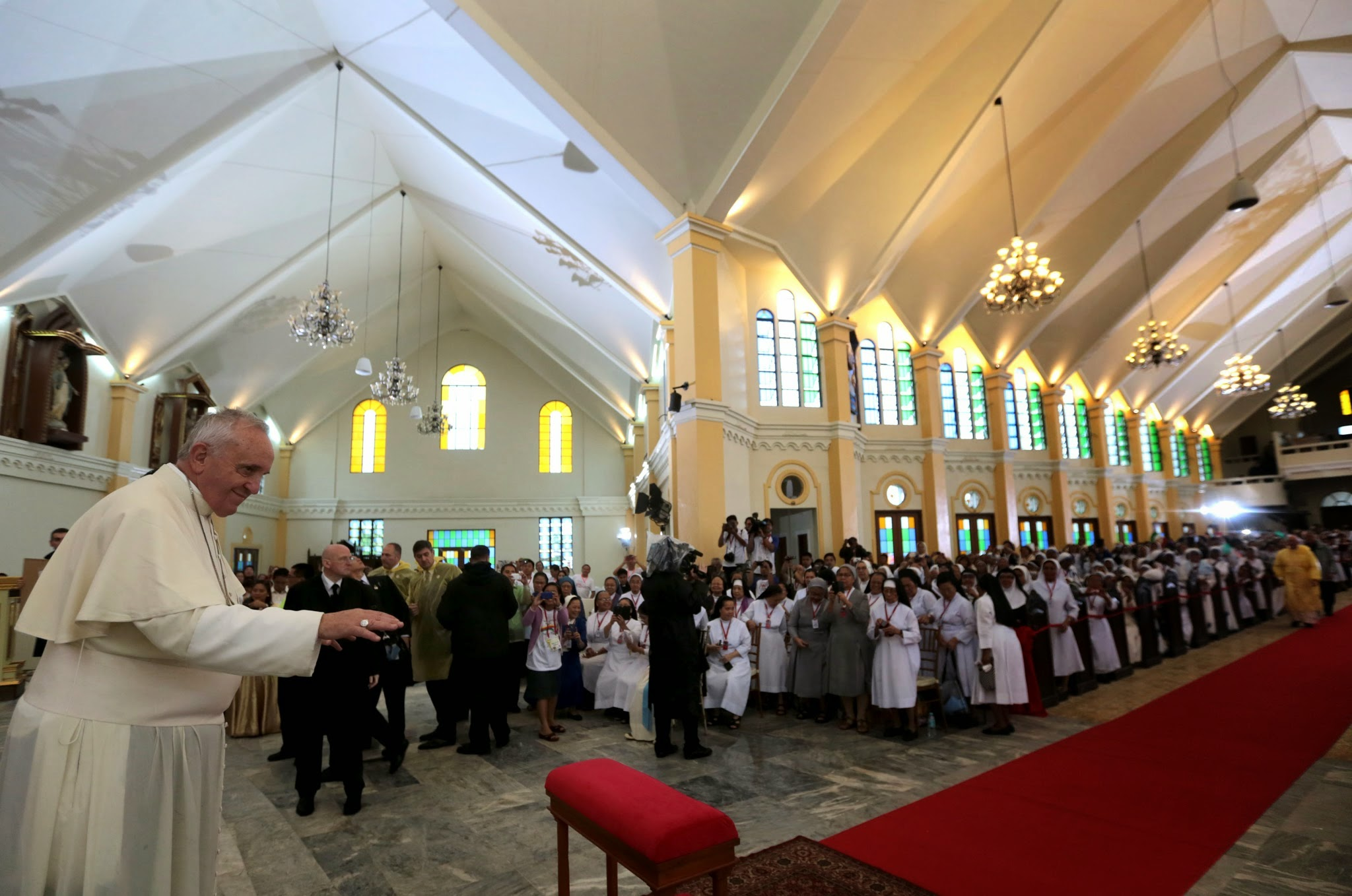
Pope Francis' visit to Palo Cathedral in 2015

The cathedral was renovated in preparation for the diamond jubilee of the Archdiocese of Palo in November 2012 at a cost of ₱25 million.

On November 8, 2013, the cathedral was damaged by Typhoon Haiyan (also known in the Philippines as Typhoon Yolanda). On November 25, seven priests were ordained at the then-roofless cathedral. A memorial service for the typhoon's casualties was held in the cathedral and the church grounds became a mass burial site. On Christmas Eve, Pope Francis appointed the Apostolic Nuncio to the country, Giuseppe Pinto, as his papal legate to lead a Midnight Mass at the roofless cathedral and to inspect the damage on churches in Eastern Visayas.

After the church's rehabilitation, Pope Francis briefly visited the cathedral on January 17, 2015, brought about by impending Tropical Storm Mekkhala. In 2015, it was declared as one of the pilgrim churches of the archdiocese by Archbishop John F. Du in observance of the Extraordinary Jubilee of Mercy.

The cathedral holds a Passion Play or Pamalandong every Good Friday.

== The Kimball Organ ==
In 2012, Kimball Pipe Organ, Opus 6718 was donated to the cathedral, and was installed after the rehabilitation of the cathedral, and rebuilding of the roof, by 2015.

The organ was installed by Diego Cera Organ Builders, and is situated in a wooden case with facade pipes, on the choir loft.

The Organ has 3 keyboards, 14 ranks, and over 1,086 pipes with heavy borrowing and extension of ranks: for example, the 16' Gedeckt on the Swell can also be drawn at 8', 4', 2 2/3', 2', and 1 3/5'.

The Choir and Great divisions share pipes, while the Swell is largely independent, with the Pedal drawing from both divisions.

The Kimball was originally installed in Showalter Hall, of the Eastern Washington University, in two chambers built into the theatre. It was then relocated in the residence of George Perks, of Spokane. The Kimball shared the residence with a Wurlitzer, and Morton Theatre Organ.

The Kimball was installed in the attic, unenclosed with the console sitting next to the pipework.

Perks later liquidated the Kimball along with the Wurlitzer, and Morton in 2005, with the Kimball going to the Pipe Organ Foundation of Mercer Island, who then donated it to the Cathedral by ship.

== Gallery ==
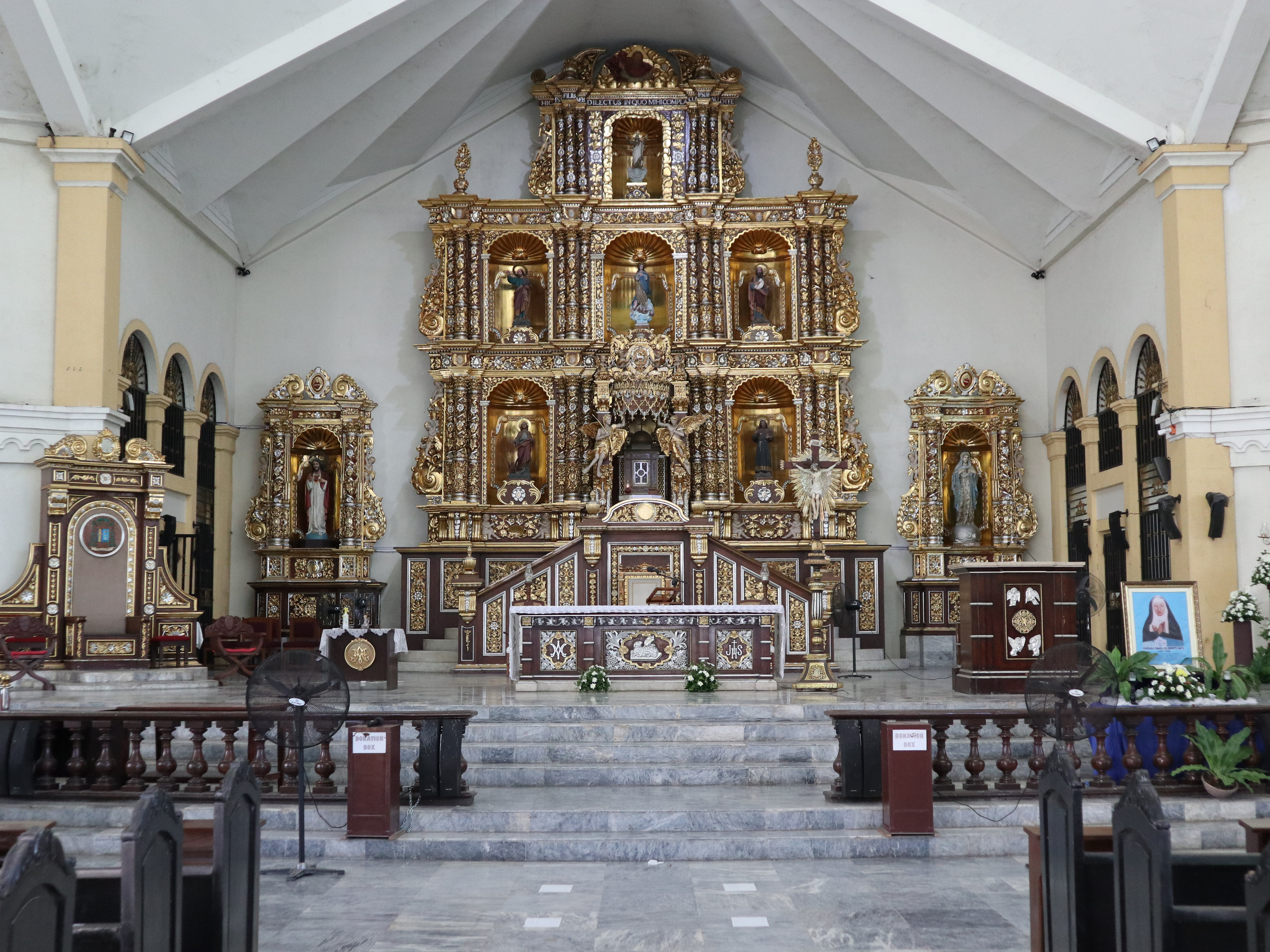
Altar inside the cathedral

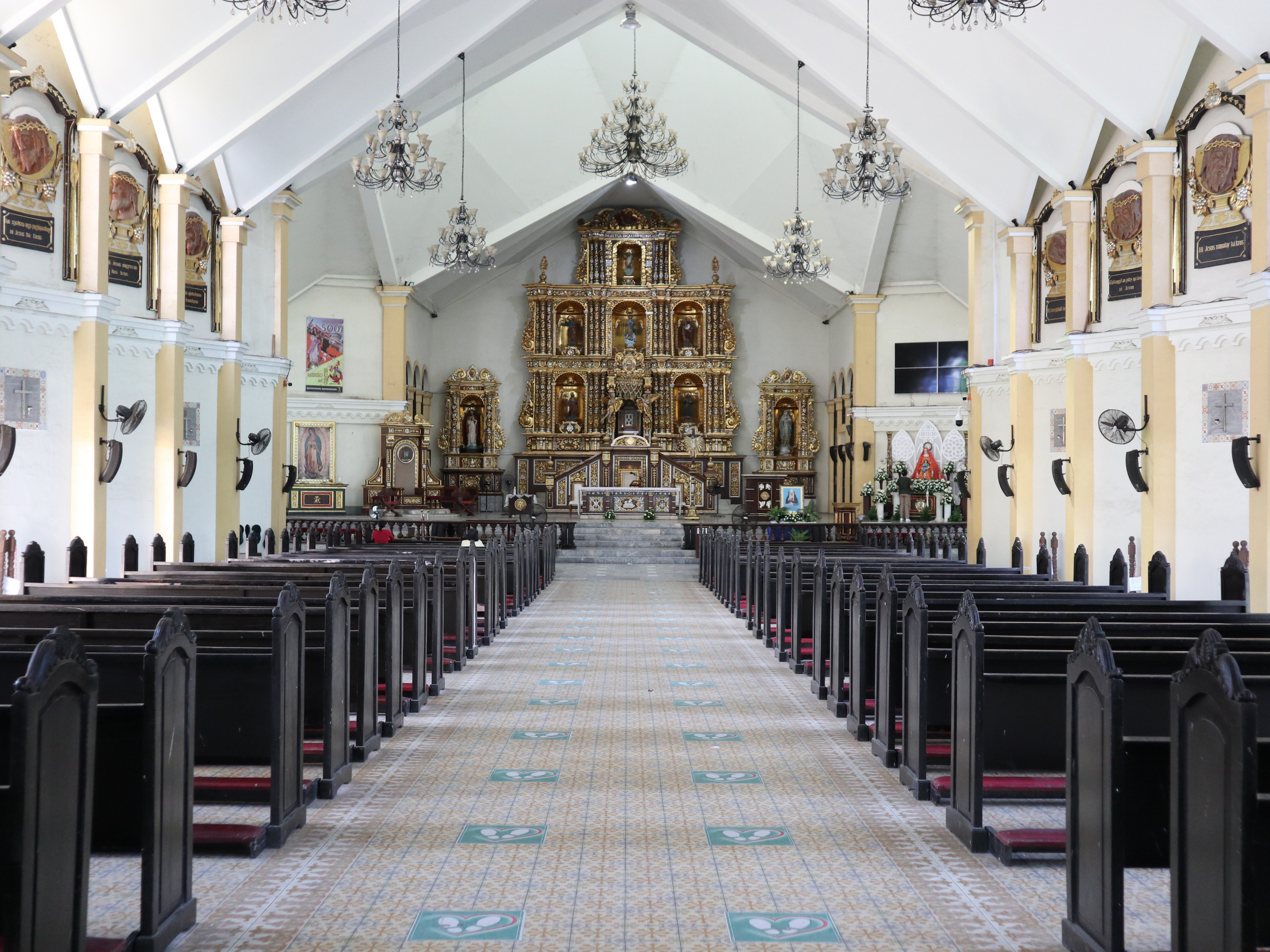
Nave in 2022

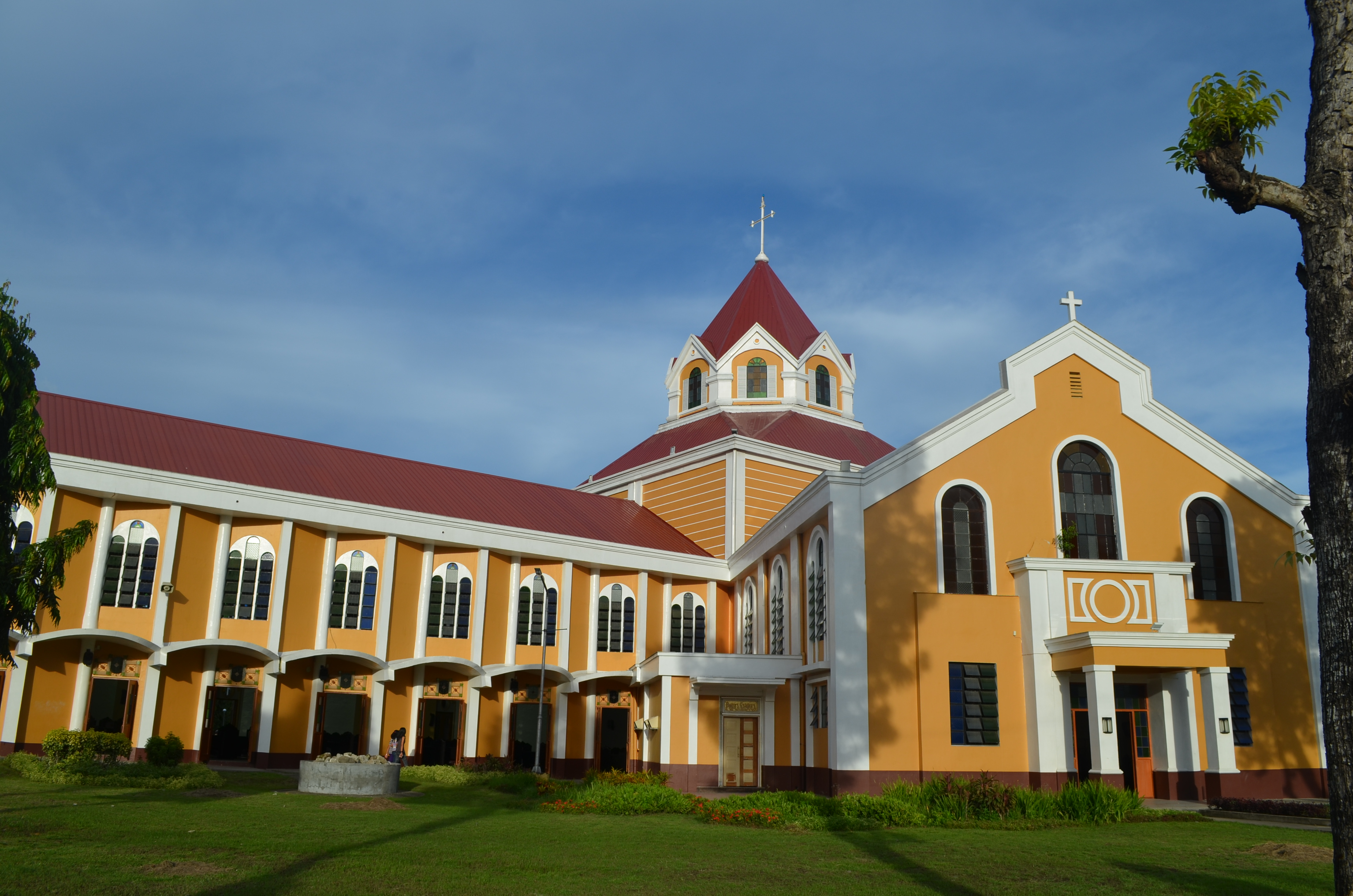
Side view of the cathedral's exterior

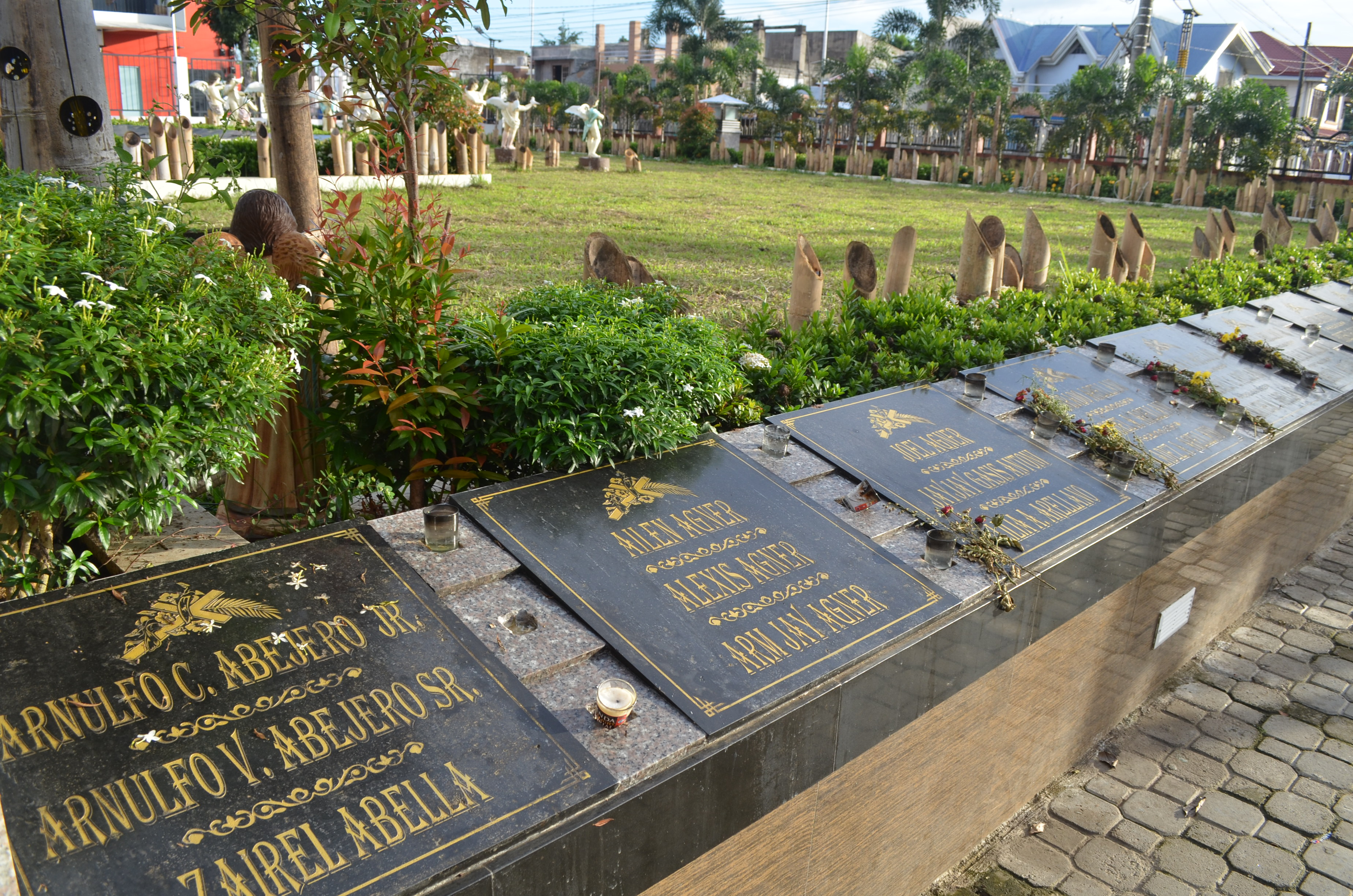
Mass graves of victims of Typhoon Haiyan within the cathedral grounds

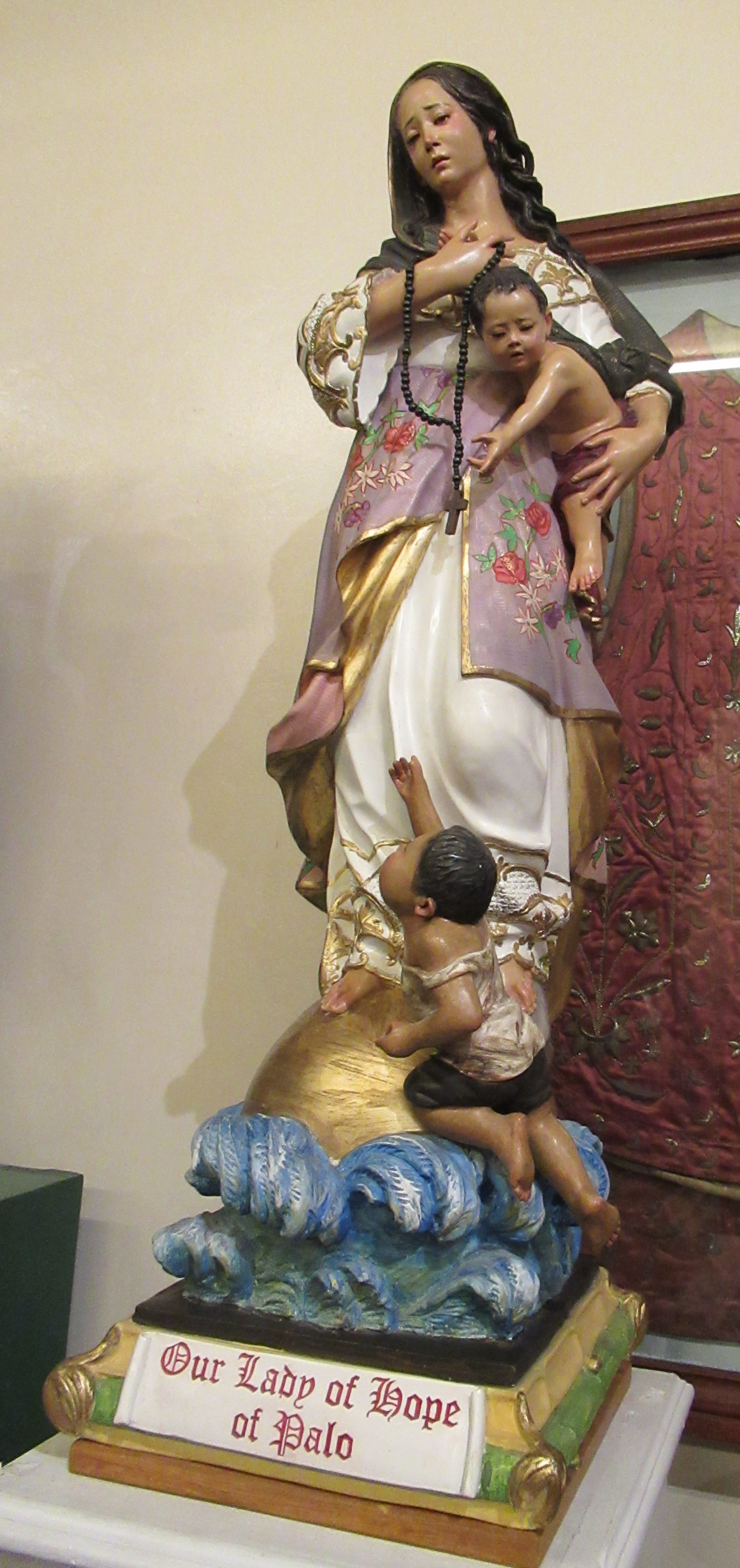
Our Lady of Hope of Palo
