= Naval Cathedral (Biliran) =

Roman Catholic church in Biliran, Philippines

- Our Lady of the Most Holy Rosary Cathedral
- Katedral ng Mahal na Birhen ng Kasanto-santuhang Rosaryo (Filipino); Catedral de Nuestra Señora del Rosario (Spanish)
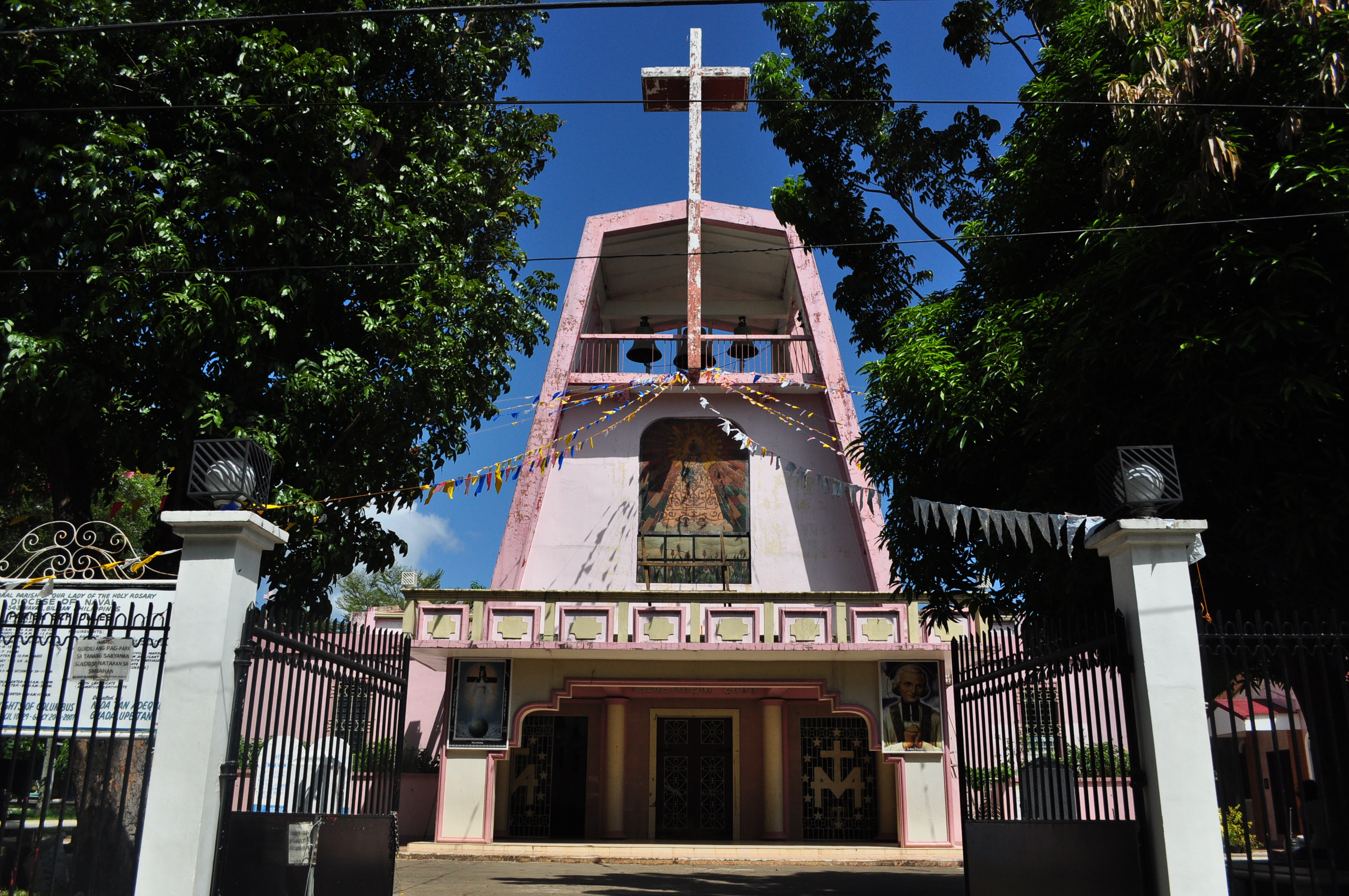
- Naval Cathedral in 2012

- Location in the Visayas Location in the Philippines
- 11°33′41″N 124°23′43″E
- Location: Naval, Biliran
- Country: Philippines
- Denomination: Roman Catholic

History
- Status: Cathedral
- Founded: 1860
- Dedication: Our Lady of the Most Holy Rosary
- Consecrated: 1860, 1966

Architecture
- Functional status: Active
- Architectural type: Church building
- Style: Modern
- Completed: 1966

Administration
- Archdiocese: Palo
- Diocese: Naval

Clergy
- Bishop: Rex Ramirez

Our Lady of the Most Holy Rosary Cathedral, commonly known as Naval Cathedral, is a 20th-century church building of the Catholic Church in the municipality of Naval, Biliran, Philippines. It is the cathedral of the Diocese of Naval.

== History ==
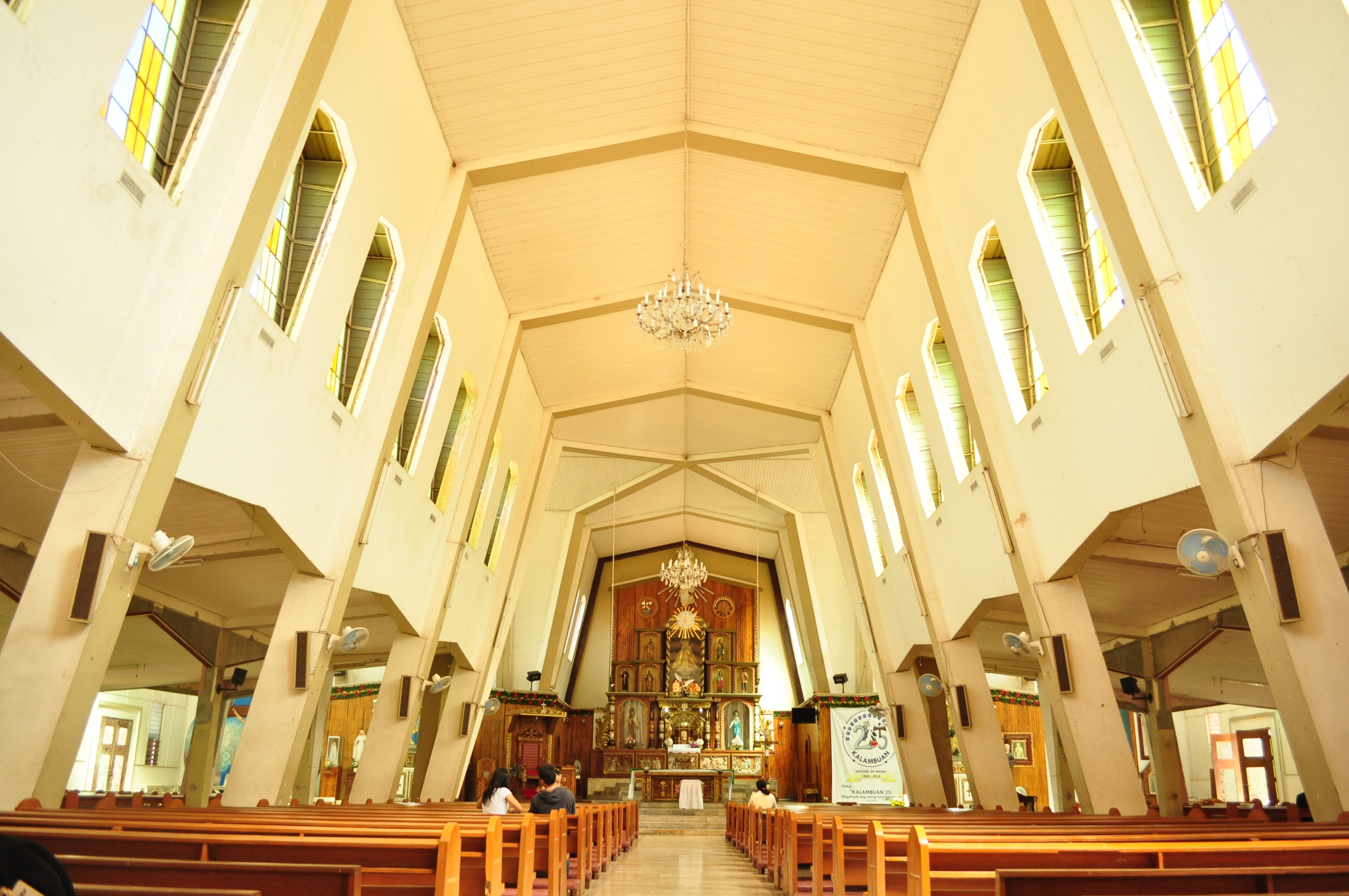
Cathedral interior in 2012

The island of Biliran used to be part of the Leyte-Samar province during the Spanish Philippines period. The parish of Naval, then known as "Bagasumbul", was founded in 1860. It later became a separate pueblo from the town of Biliran in 1869 after a petition for its independence was submitted in 1861. In the latter half of the 19th century, the first church of Naval was built but was destroyed by a typhoon in 1912. A new church was then constructed which would eventually undergo a facade renovation under the helm of Fr. Deodato Esplanada in 1950. This was replaced with the new and present edifice which was built in 1965. The church became a cathedral when the Diocese of Naval was founded in 1988. The diocese comprises Biliran and extreme northwestern Leyte province.
