= Santa Fe, Leyte =

Municipality in Leyte, Philippines

Santa Fe
- Municipality
- Municipality of Santa Fe
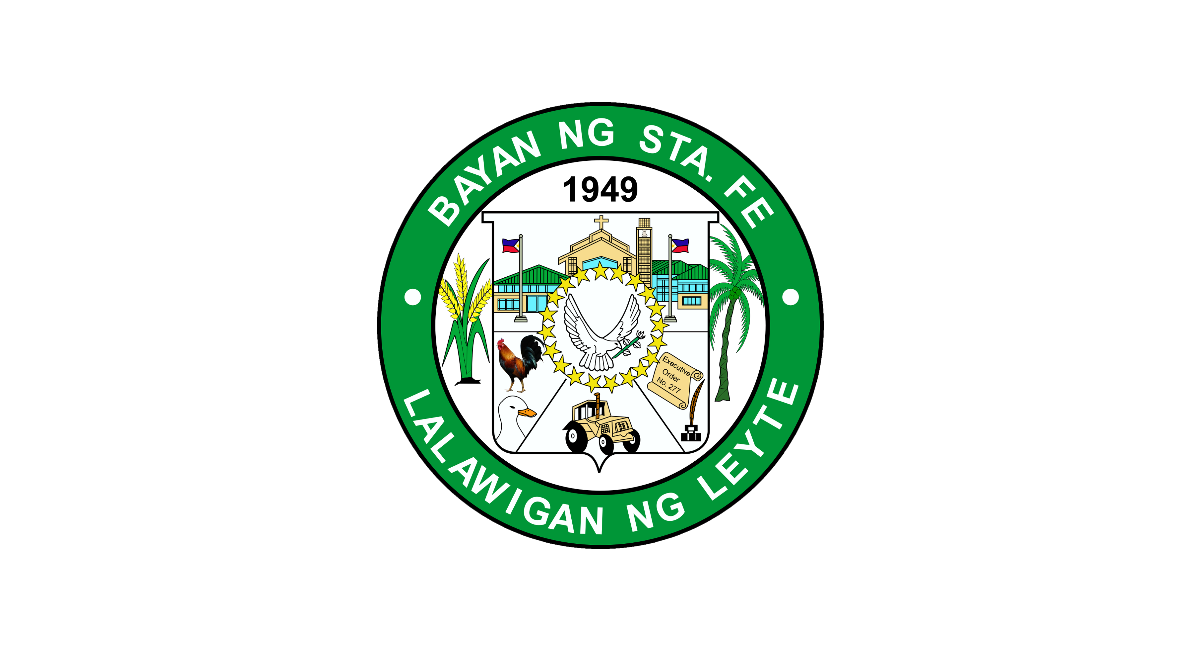
- Flag Seal

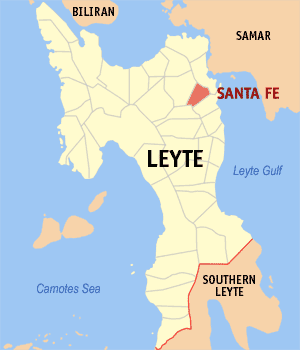
- Map of Leyte with Santa Fe highlighted
- Interactive map of Santa Fe
- Location within the Philippines
- Coordinates: 11°11′08″N 124°54′58″E
- Country: Philippines
- Region: Eastern Visayas
- Province: Leyte
- District: 1st district
- Barangays: 20 (see Barangays)

Government
  - Type: Sangguniang Bayan
  - Mayor: Amparo H. Monteza
  - Vice Mayor: Eduardo N. Tereros
  - Representative: Ferdinand Martin G. Romualdez
  - Councilors: List: • Eduardo N. Toreros; • Edgardo R. Salceda; • Charlito L. Lago; • Ma. Evangelyn P. Modesto; • Agnes A. Chuca; • Eduardo L. Lantajo; • Assandro D. Echague; • Alicia M. Malquisto; DILG Masterlist of Officials
  - Electorate: 15,436 voters (2025)

Area
  - Total: 53.97 km^{2} (20.84 sq mi)
- Elevation: 29 m (95 ft)
- Highest elevation: 389 m (1,276 ft)
- Lowest elevation: 0 m (0 ft)

Population (2024 census)
  - Total: 22,889
  - Density: 424.1/km^{2} (1,098/sq mi)
  - Households: 5,329

Economy
  - Income class: 4th municipal income class
  - Poverty incidence: 36.63% (2023)
  - Revenue: ₱ 120.6 million (2024)
  - Assets: ₱ 515.3 million (2024)
  - Expenditure: ₱ 154.8 million (2024)
  - Liabilities: ₱ 215 million (2024)

Service provider
  - Electricity: Leyte 3 Electric Cooperative (LEYECO 3)
- Time zone: UTC+8 (PST)
- ZIP code: 6513
- PSGC: 0803744000
- IDD : area code: +63 (0)53
- Native languages: Waray; Tagalog

Santa Fe (IPA: [sɐntɐ 'fɛ]), officially the Municipality of Santa Fe (Waray: Bungto han Santa Fe; Tagalog: Bayan ng Santa Fe), is a municipality in the province of Leyte, Philippines. According to the 2024 census, it has a population of 22,889 people.

== History ==
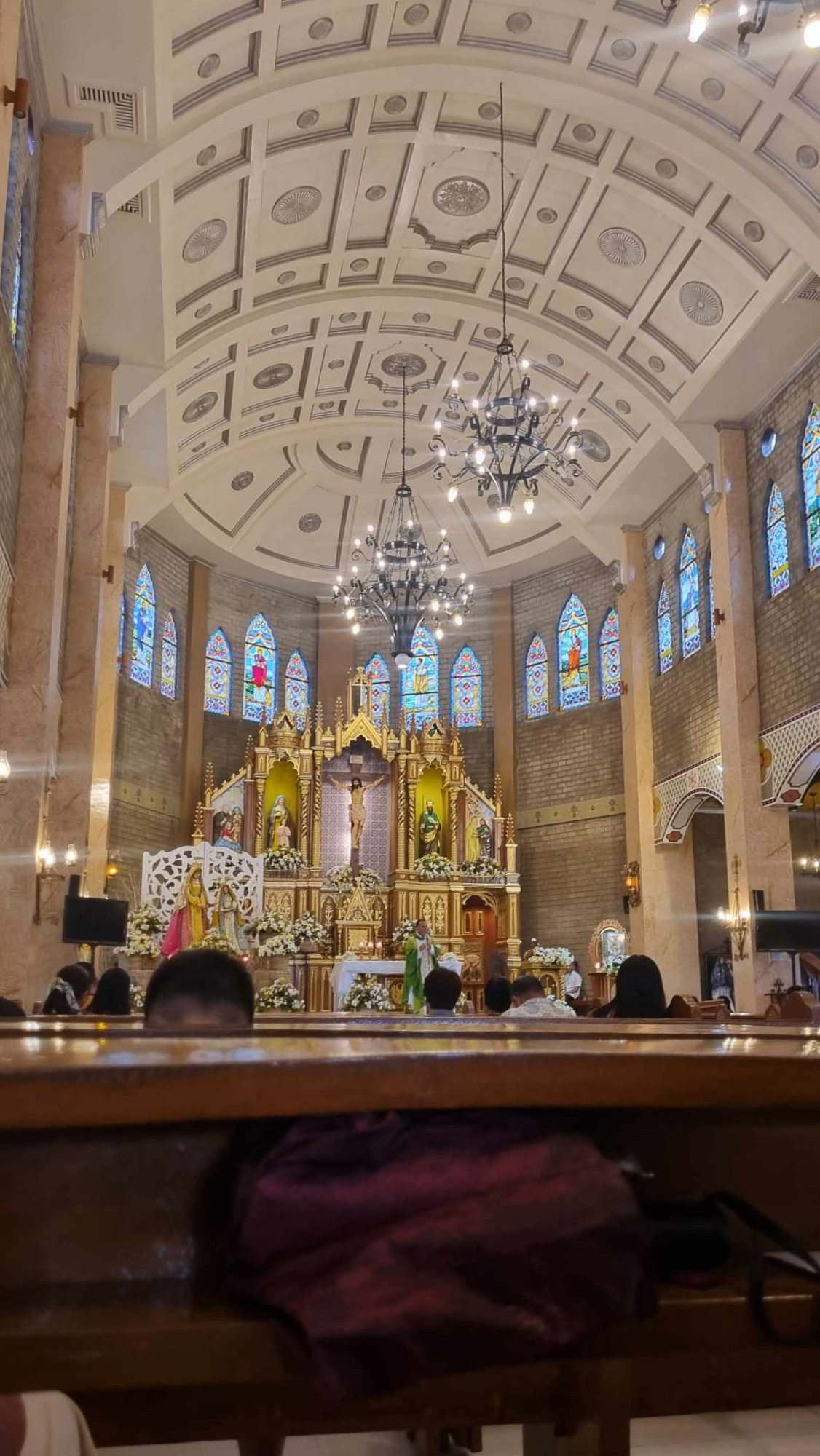
A picture of the Santa Fe Church (also called the Saint Anne Church), in Leyte.

About thirty years ago, Santa Fe was just one of the biggest barrios of Palo, Leyte. In 1948, Juan R. Perez, a native of this barrio, was a private secretary. Inspired and prompted by Melquiades Almen, Julian Dagami, Jose Catada, Antonio Evalo, Eulogio Navarra and Maximo Postreto, all civic leaders and with the consent of Mayor Generoso Alvarado of Palo, House Bill No. 1918 was drafted and sponsored on May 6, 1948, on the floor of the House of Representatives by Congressman Perez, creating Santa Fe a town. At first there was strong opposition from the residents of Palo as Santa Fe and other affected barrios were the main source of income for the town but the oppositionist were silenced by the budding leaders of Santa Fe. The bill was finally approved by the lower house and the Senate under the leadership of Senator Jose Avelino. However, politics intervened. While the bill was waiting for the signature of President Elpidio Quirino, there was a split of the party in power.

Although President Quirino was the logical candidate for election, many leaders believed that Senate President Jose Avelino was the apparent successor to the presidency. Don Pio Pedrosa, then Secretary of Finance in the Cabinet of President Quirino was commissioned to sound out the political sentiments of the people of Santa Fe in that presidential election. His objective in visiting Santa Fe was to unite the leaders there so that it would be easy for him to secure approval of the bill pending the signature of President Quirino converting Santa Fe into a town. Those supporting the administration met Sec. Pedrosa in the old Martinez residence. Atty. Carlos Martinez was the leader of this group. Those supporting Senate President Jose Avelino, under the leadership of the private secretary of Congressman Juan Perez met Sec. Pedrosa in the public victory in the entire country. The bill creating Santa Fe into a town was vetoed. However, the yearnings, dreams and aspirations of this ambitious barrio was not to be denied for long. Smarting from the bitter lesson of disunity, fresh efforts were exerted to renew the campaign with more enthusiasm to convince the powers that Santa Fe should be made a free and independent town from Palo, in the name of progress. At this point, the warring political factions of the town were strongly united and determined to overcome all obstacles along the way. Under the guidance of Santa Ana, the patroness of this barrio, Don Pio Pedrosa forgave those who did not follow him in that presidential election. Upon his strong recommendation, President Quirino, by Executive Order No. 277 dated October 10, 1949, created Santa Fe, together with Tunga and Julita as new towns of Leyte.

Santa Fe was then born as a free and independent town by presidential fiat and notably legislative action. On the eve of its traditional town fiesta, the residents under the leadership of Mayor Iluminado Martinez, one of the first councilors of Santa Fe in 1949 and dynamic parish priest Rev. Father Antonio Adre, in grateful remembrance and recognition, saluted the efforts of those who led in making Santa Fe a town out of several barrios of Palo. Its fertile fields and valleys abound with corn, camote and other root crops, while its rivers Kasili-on and Maslog are rich with fish, adequate in quantity to give food and sustenance to its ever-increasing population. The BANCOM projects in its northern periphery promises to be the rice granary of the town. Today there are 20 barangays in Santa Fe with an area of 5,567 hectares irrigated and planted with rice.

== Geography ==
=== Barangays ===
Santa Fe is politically subdivided into 20 barangays. Each barangay consists of puroks and some have sitios.

- Baculanad
- Badiangay
- Bulod
- Catoogan
- Katipunan (formerly the sitio of Pinanhadsan)
- Milagrosa (formerly the sitio of Km. 17)
- Pilit
- Pitogo
- Zone 1 (Poblacion)
- Zone 2 (Poblacion)
- Zone 3 (Poblacion)
- San Isidro
- San Juan
- San Miguelay
- San Roque (formerly Curba)
- Tibak
- Victoria
- Cutay
- Gapas
- Zone 4 Poblacion (Cabangcalan)

=== Climate ===
Climate data for Santa Fe, Leyte
Month	Jan	Feb	Mar	Apr	May	Jun	Jul	Aug	Sep	Oct	Nov	Dec	Year
Mean daily maximum °C (°F)	28 (82)	28 (82)	29 (84)	31 (88)	31 (88)	31 (88)	30 (86)	30 (86)	30 (86)	29 (84)	29 (84)	28 (82)	30 (85)
Mean daily minimum °C (°F)	23 (73)	23 (73)	23 (73)	24 (75)	24 (75)	25 (77)	24 (75)	24 (75)	24 (75)	24 (75)	24 (75)	23 (73)	24 (75)
Average precipitation mm (inches)	98 (3.9)	82 (3.2)	96 (3.8)	71 (2.8)	104 (4.1)	129 (5.1)	101 (4.0)	94 (3.7)	99 (3.9)	135 (5.3)	174 (6.9)	143 (5.6)	1,326 (52.3)
Average rainy days	18.0	14.1	17.1	16.8	23.7	25.7	25.8	23.3	24.2	25.9	24.0	20.6	259.2
Source: Meteoblue

== Demographics ==
Population census of Santa Fe
Year	Pop.	±% p.a.
1960	7,979	—
1970	7,649	−0.42%
1975	8,718	+2.66%
1980	9,728	+2.22%
1990	12,119	+2.22%
1995	13,695	+2.32%
2000	15,042	+2.03%
2007	15,905	+0.77%
2010	17,427	+3.38%
2015	20,439	+3.08%
2020	22,102	+1.66%
2024	22,889	+0.84%
Source: Philippine Statistics Authority

In the 2024 census, the population of Santa Fe was 22,889 people, with a density of 420 inhabitants per square kilometre or 1,100 inhabitants per square mile.

== Economy ==
Poverty incidence of Santa Fe (%)

Source: Philippine Statistics Authority

== Government ==
=== Elected Officials ===
2025-2028 Santa Fe, Leyte Officials
Position	Name	Party
Mayor	Amparo H. Monteza	Lakas
Vice Mayor	Eduardo N. Toreros	Lakas
Councilors	Rodel L. Ajeto	NPC
Councilors	Ricardo D. Fajardo	Lakas
Councilors	Belen C. Chuca	Lakas
Councilors	Amiel P. Enage	Lakas
Councilors	Geny R. Esmero	Lakas
Councilors	Larry S. Aruta	Lakas
Councilors	Alvin D. Petilla	NPC
Councilors	Leah T. Salceda	Lakas
Ex Officio Municipal Council Members
ABC President	TBD	Nonpartisan
SK Federation President	TBD	Nonpartisan

== Education ==
There are a total of 17 elementary schools and 2 high schools in Santa Fe, Leyte

=== Elementary/Grade School ===
- Baculanad Elementary School
- Badiangay Elementary School
- Bulod Elementary School
- Catoogan Elementary School
- Cutay Elementary School
- Gapas Elementary School
- Katipunan Elementary School
- Milagrosa Elementary School
- Pilit Elementary School
- Pitogo Elementary School
- San Isidro Elementary School
- San Juan Elementary School
- San Miguelay Elementary School
- San Roque Elementary School
- Santa Fe Central School
- Tibak Elementary School
- Victoria Elementary School

=== High School/Secondary Schools ===
- Santa Fe National High School
- Santa Fe Stand-alone Senior High School
