= Diocese of Naval =

Latin Catholic diocese in the Philippines

Diocese of Naval Dioecesis Navaliensis Diyosesis han Naval Diyosesis sa Naval Diyosesis ng Naval

Catholic
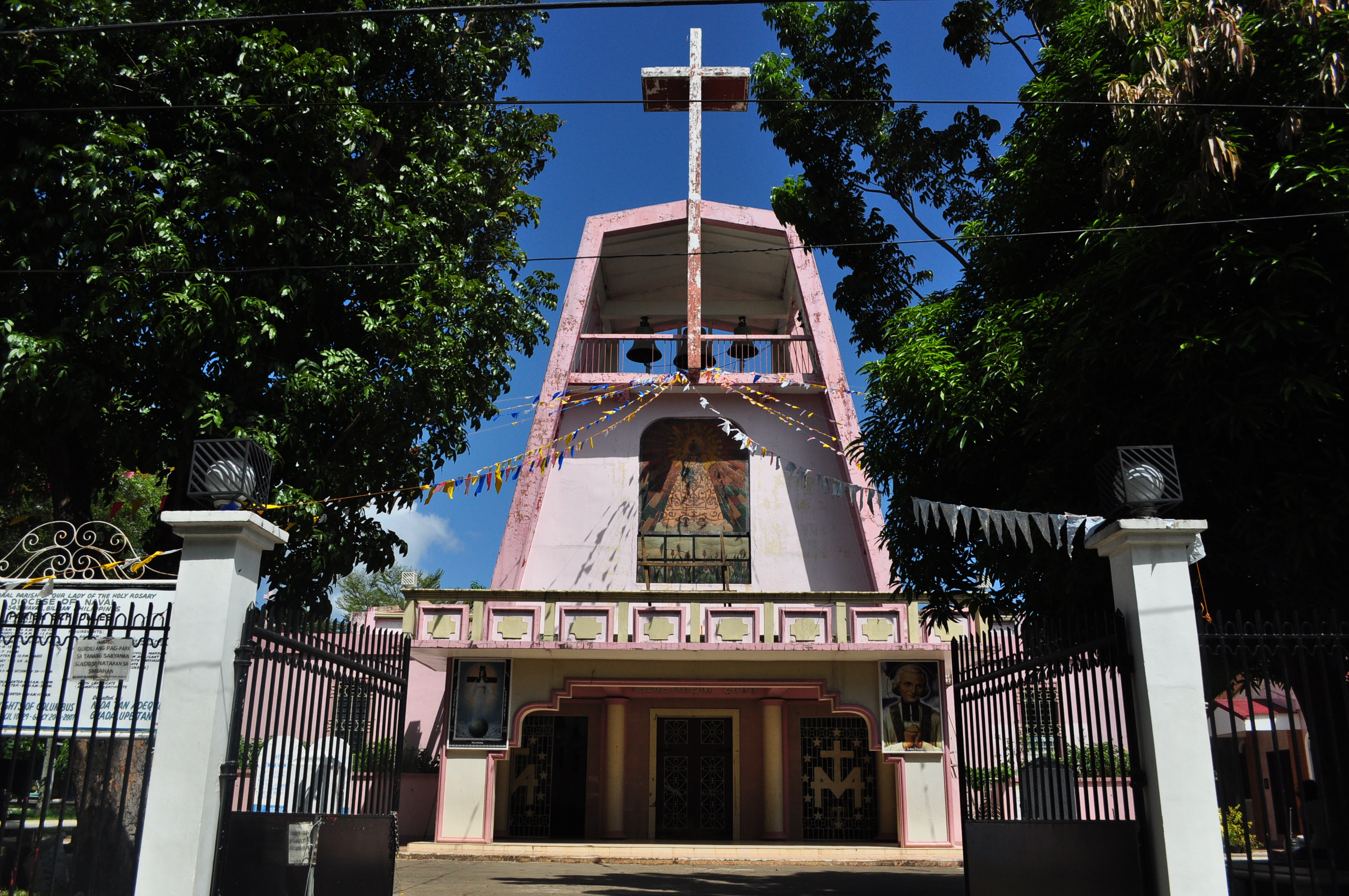
- Naval Cathedral, Biliran

- Coat of arms

Location
- Country: Philippines
- Territory: Biliran; Leyte (Calubian, Leyte, San Isidro, Tabango)
- Ecclesiastical province: Palo
- Metropolitan: Palo
- Coordinates: 11°33′41″N 124°23′42″E

Statistics
- Area: 1,005 km^{2} (388 sq mi)
- Population: Total; Catholics: (as of 2021); 410,670; 370,734 (90.3%)
- Parishes: 15

Information
- Denomination: Catholic
- Sui iuris church: Latin Church
- Rite: Roman Rite
- Established: 29 November 1988
- Cathedral: Our Lady of the Most Holy Rosary Cathedral, Naval
- Patron saint: Our Lady of the Most Holy Rosary
- Secular priests: 28

Current leadership
- Pope: Leo XIV
- Bishop: Rex Cullingham Ramirez
- Metropolitan Archbishop: John F. Du
- Vicar General: Msgr. Venancio Sosing
- Bishops emeritus: Filomeno G. Bactol

The Diocese of Naval (Lat: Dioecesis Navaliensis) is a diocese of the Roman Rite of the Latin Church of the Catholic Church in the Philippines. Its cathedral is in Naval, Biliran in the Eastern Visayas. Its territory includes the whole island of Biliran and the four towns at the northwestern tip of Leyte Province.

Erected in 1988, the diocese was created from territory of the Roman Catholic Archdiocese of Palo, to which the diocese remains a suffragan. The first appointed bishop was Filomeno Bactol (1988–2017). On October 13, 2017, his retirement was accepted by the Pope two years after reaching the mandatory age of 75. Pope Francis appointed Rex Cullingham Ramirez, a priest from the Archdiocese of Palo, as the new bishop of Naval. His episcopal ordination took place at the Palo Metropolitan Cathedral on January 9, 2018. He was canonically installed on January 12, 2018, at Naval Cathedral. Ramirez is the second bishop of the diocese.

The Cathedral School of La Naval was established in 1990 AD. It is the first Catholic school in the diocese.

Marvyn Maceda, the bishop of San Jose de Antique, grew up in the Naval diocese and was a priest of the diocese before becoming the bishop of San Jose.

== Ordinaries ==
No	Name	In office	Coat of arms
1.	Filomeno Gonzales Bactol	29 November 1988 – 13 October 2017	
2.	Rex Cullingham Ramirez	13 October 2017 – present	

== See also ==
- Catholic Church in the Philippines
