= List of Catholic dioceses in the Philippines =

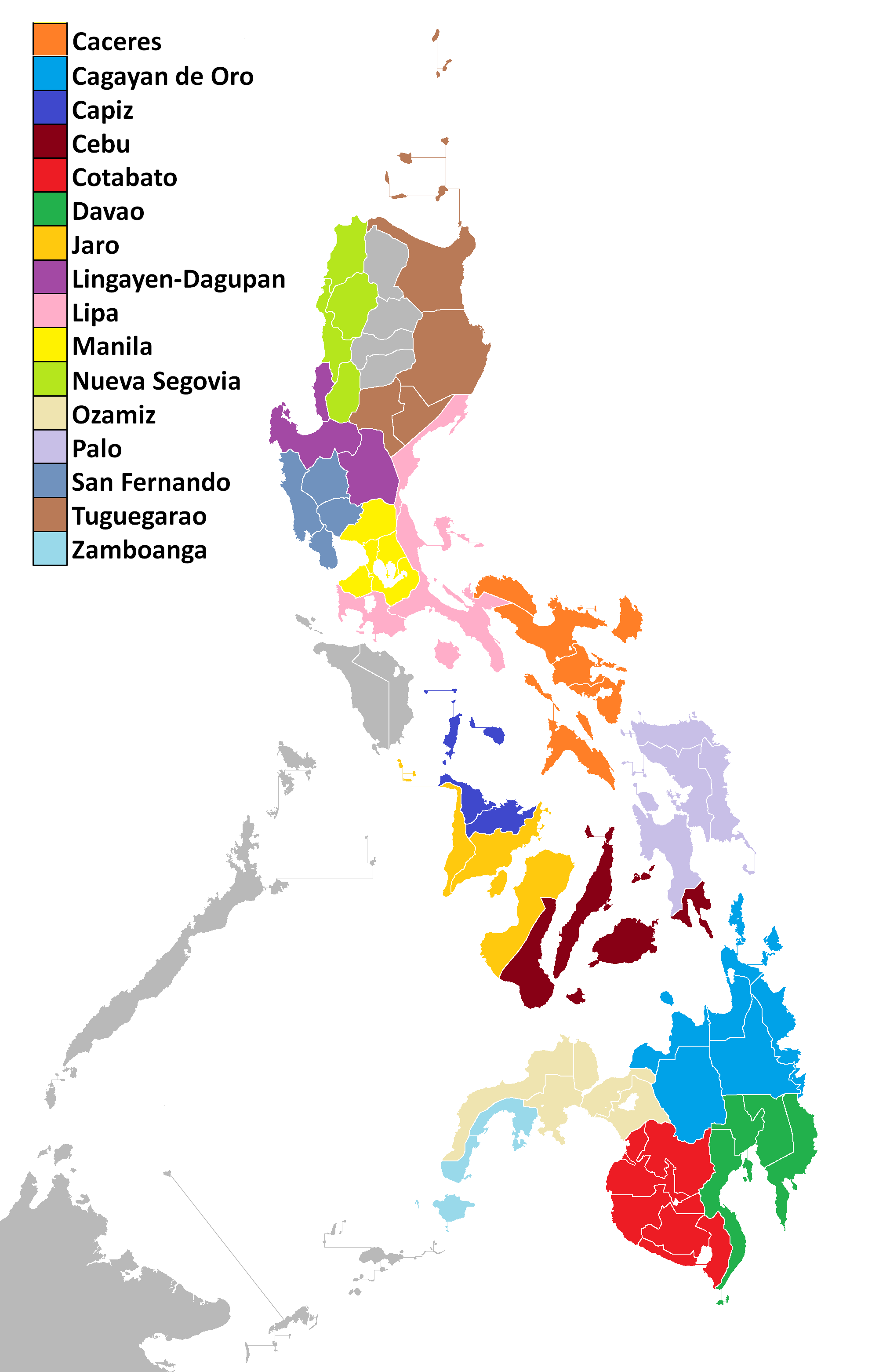
Catholic ecclesiastical provinces in the Philippines

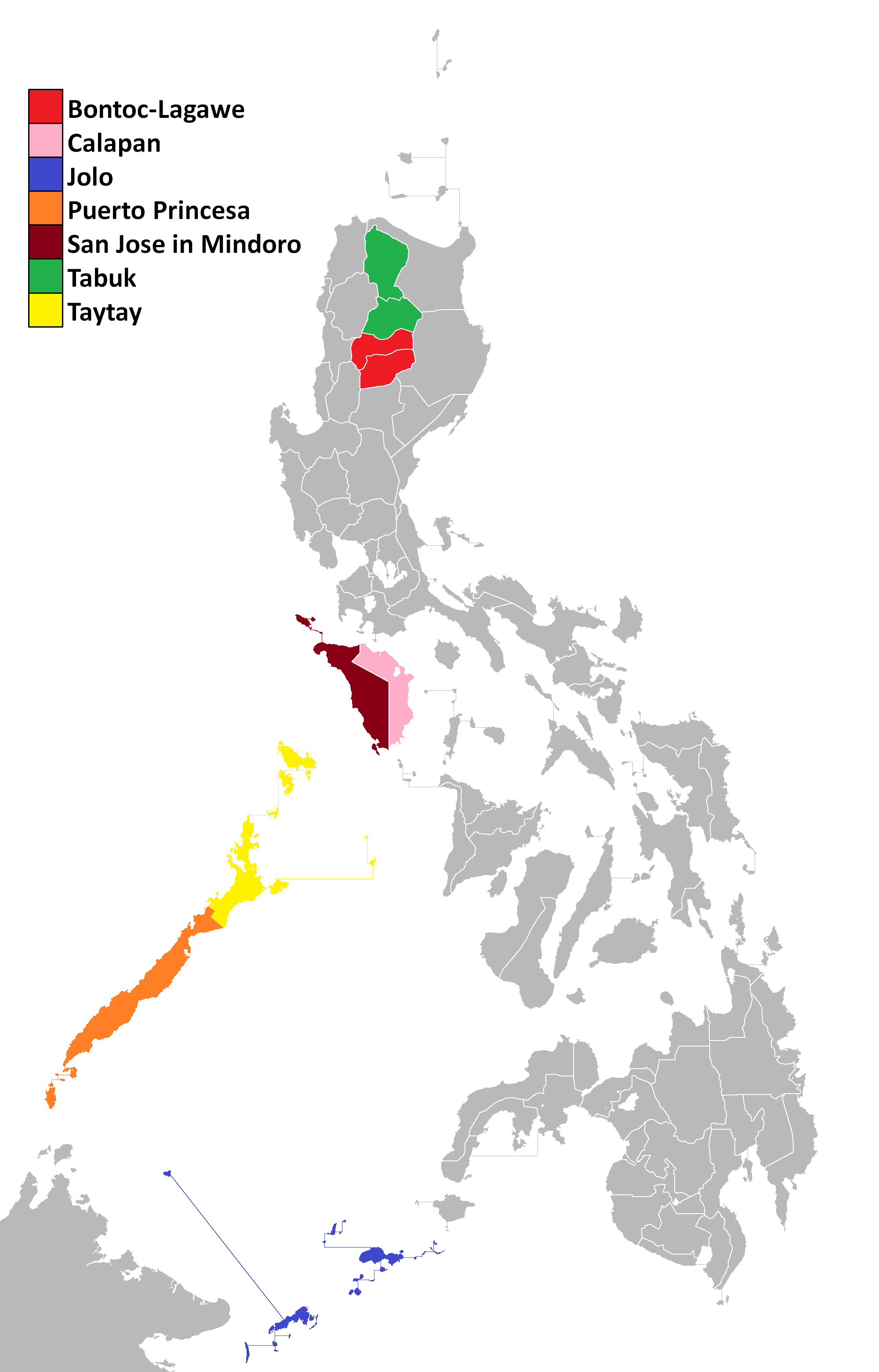
Catholic apostolic vicariates in the Philippines

The Catholic dioceses in the Philippines are grouped into 16 ecclesiastical provinces, each of which comprises a metropolitan archdiocese and several suffragan dioceses and is headed by the archbishop, as the metropolitan bishop of the province. The dioceses' bishops comprise the Catholic Bishops' Conference of the Philippines (CBCP), an episcopal conference.

Apostolic vicariates and the military ordinariate are not part of any ecclesiastical province, but are included in the table. Like diocesan bishops, they are the ordinary responsible for spiritual care the Catholics under them and are directly subject to the Holy See. Currently, there are six apostolic vicariates and one military ordinariate in the Philippines.

== List of dioceses ==
Ecclesiastical province	Coat of arms	Episcopal see	Local ordinary	Cathedral	Erected	Area Jurisdiction	Catholic population (2023)
Caceres		Archdiocese of Cáceres Archidioecesis Cacerensis	Rex Andrew Alarcon (since May 2, 2024)	Metropolitan Cathedral and Parish of Saint John the Evangelist, Naga	August 14, 1595	3,207 km² Naga and parts of Camarines Sur (3rd Disrict, 4th District and 5th District, including Gainza)	1,761,509
Caceres		Diocese of Daet Dioecesis Daetiensis	Herman Abcede RCJ (since May 1, 2025)	Cathedral of the Most Holy Trinity, Daet, Camarines Norte	May 27, 1974	2,200 km² Camarines Norte	636,202
Caceres		Diocese of Legazpi Dioecesis Legazpiensis	Joel Baylon (since December 14, 2009)	Saint Gregory the Great Cathedral, Legazpi, Albay	June 29, 1951	2,575 km² Albay	1,389,658
Caceres		Diocese of Libmanan Dioecesis Libmanana	José Rojas Rojas (since June 19, 2009)	Cathedral of Saint James the Apostle, Libmanan, Camarines Sur	December 9, 1989	1,903 km² Parts of Camarines Sur (1st District and 2nd District, except Gainza)	511,196
Caceres		Diocese of Masbate Dioecesis Masbatensis	Sede vacante (since December 13, 2025) Claro Caluya III (Administrator since December 19, 2025)	Saint Anthony of Padua Cathedral, Masbate City, Masbate	March 23, 1968	7,000 km² Masbate	930,324
Caceres		Diocese of Sorsogon Dioecesis Sorsogonensis	Jose Alan Dialogo (since December 14, 2019)	Saints Peter and Paul Cathedral Parish, Sorsogon City, Sorsogon	June 29, 1951	2,141 km² Sorsogon	779,900
Caceres		Diocese of Virac Dioecesis Viracensis	Luisito Occiano (since June 21, 2024)	Immaculate Conception Cathedral Parish, Virac, Catanduanes	May 27, 1974	1,512 km² Catanduanes	263,483 (Note: Catholic population as of 2022.)
Cagayan de Oro		Archdiocese of Cagayan de Oro Archidioecesis Cagayana	Jose Cabantan (since August 28, 2020)	Saint Augustine Metropolitan Cathedral, Cagayan de Oro	January 20, 1933	3,799 km² Cagayan de Oro, Camiguin, Misamis Oriental and part of Bukidnon (Malitbog)	1,443,993
Cagayan de Oro		Diocese of Butuan Dioecesis Butuanensis	Cosme Almedilla (since June 25, 2019)	Saint Joseph Cathedral, Butuan	March 20, 1967	3,429 km² Agusan del Norte and Butuan	490,326 (Note: Catholic population as of 2024.)
Cagayan de Oro		Diocese of Malaybalay Dioecesis Malaibalaiensis	Noel Pedregosa (since September 14, 2021)	Saint Isidro Labrador Cathedral, Malaybalay, Bukidnon	April 25, 1969	8,294 km² Bukidnon (excluding Malitbog), part Davao City (Barangay Buda) and part of Lanao del Sur (Wao)	1,363,026
Cagayan de Oro		Diocese of Prosperidad Dioecesis Prosperitatis	Ruben Labajo (since January 28, 2025)	Saint Michael the Archangel Cathedral, Prosperidad, Agusan del Sur	October 15, 2024	9,989 km² Agusan del Sur	486,251
Cagayan de Oro		Diocese of Surigao Dioecesis Surigensis	Antonieto Cabajog (since July 24, 2001)	San Nicolas de Tolentino Cathedral, Surigao City, Surigao del Norte	June 3, 1939	3,739 km² Dinagat Islands and Surigao del Norte	505,000
Cagayan de Oro		Diocese of Tandag Dioecesis Tandagensis	Raul Dael (since June 14, 2018)	New San Nicolas de Tolentino Cathedral, Tandag, Surigao del Sur Old San Nicolas de Tolentino Cathedral, Tandag, Surigao del Sur (co-cathedral)	June 16, 1978	4,933 km² Surigao del Sur	592,968
Capiz		Archdiocese of Capiz Archidioecesis Capicensis	Victor Bendico (since May 3, 2023)	Metropolitan Cathedral and Archdiocesan Shrine of the Immaculate Conception, Roxas City, Capiz	January 27, 1951	2,633 km² Capiz	828,386
Capiz		Diocese of Kalibo Dioecesis Kalibensis	Cyril Villareal (since April 23, 2026)	Cathedral Parish of Saint John the Baptist, Kalibo, Aklan	January 17, 1976	1,818 km² Aklan	679,400
Capiz		Diocese of Romblon Dioecesis Rombloniensis	Narciso Abellana MSC (since January 9, 2014)	Saint Joseph Cathedral Parish, Romblon, Romblon	December 19, 1974	1,567 km² Romblon	472,660
Cebu		Archdiocese of Cebu Archidioecesis Nominis Iesu o Caebuana	Alberto Uy (since September 30, 2025)	Metropolitan Cathedral of Cebu and Parish of Saint Vitalis of Milan, Cebu City	August 14, 1595	5,088 km² Cebu, Cebu City, Lapu-Lapu City and Mandaue	4,678,039
Cebu		Diocese of Dumaguete Dioecesis Dumaguetensis	Julito Cortes (since December 5, 2013)	Saint Catherine of Alexandria Cathedral Parish, Dumaguete, Negros Oriental	April 5, 1955	4,956 km² Siquijor and Negros Oriental (excluding Canlaon, Guihulngan, La Libertad and Vallehermoso)	1,412,394
Cebu		Diocese of Maasin Dioecesis Maasinensis	Precioso Cantillas SDB (since March 11, 1998)	National Shrine and Cathedral Parish of Our Lady of the Assumption, Maasin, Southern Leyte	March 23, 1968	2,506 km² Southern Leyte and parts of Leyte (Bato, Baybay, Hilongos, Hindang, Inopacan and Matalom)	706,966
Cebu		Diocese of Tagbilaran Dioecesis Tagbilarana	Crispin Varquez (since October 27, 2026)	Diocesan Shrine and Cathedral-Parish of Saint Joseph the Worker, Tagbilaran, Bohol	November 8, 1941	1,734 km² Parts of Bohol (1st District, including Batuan, Bilar, Clarin, Dimiao, Garcia Hernandez, Lila, Loay, Loboc, Sagbayan, San Isidro, Sevilla and Valencia)	705,898
Cebu		Diocese of Talibon Dioecesis Talibonensis	Daniel Parcon (since August 26, 2014)	Most Holy Trinity Cathedral Parish, Talibon, Bohol	January 9, 1986	2,243 km² Parts of Bohol (2nd District and 3rd Disrict, excluding Batuan, Bilar, Clarin, Dimiao, Garcia Hernandez, Lila, Loay, Loboc, Sagbayan, San Isidro, Sevilla and Valencia)	604,548
Cotabato		Archdiocese of Cotabato Archidioecesis Cotabatensis	Charlie Inzon OMI (since December 8, 2025)	Immaculate Conception Cathedral Parish, Cotabato City	August 11, 1950	9,575 km² Cotabato City, Maguindanao del Norte, Maguindanao del Sur, Sultan Kudarat (excluding Columbio and Barangay Milbuk, Palimbang) and parts of Cotabato (1st District, including Banisilan)	1,108,300
Cotabato		Diocese of Kidapawan Dioecesis Kidapavanensis	Jose Colin Bagaforo (since September 6, 2016)	Our Lady Mediatrix of All Grace Cathedral, Kidapawan, Cotabato	June 12, 1976	5,199 km² Parts of Cotabato (2nd District and 3rd District, excluding Banisilan) and part of Sultan Kudarat (Columbio)	626,150
Cotabato		Diocese of Marbel Dioecesis Marbeliana	Cerilo Casicas (since July 11, 2018)	Christ the King Cathedral, Koronadal, South Cotabato	December 17, 1960	10,000 km² General Santos, Sarangani, South Cotabato and part of Sultan Kudarat (Barangay Milbuk, Palimbang)	1,691,050
Davao		Archdiocese of Davao Archdioecesis Davaënsis	Abel Apigo (since November 9, 2026) George Rimando (Auxiliary bishop since May 25, 2006)	San Pedro Cathedral Parish, Davao City	December 17, 1949	2,443 km² Davao City and parts of Davao del Norte (Samal)	1,506,873
Davao		Diocese of Digos Dioecesis Digosensis	Guillermo Afable (since February 11, 2003)	Mary Mediatrix of All Grace Cathedral, Digos, Davao del Sur	November 5, 1979	4,327 km² Davao del Sur and Davao Occidental	856,039
Davao		Diocese of Mati Dioecesis Matiensis	Sede vacante (since November 9, 2026)	San Nicolas de Tolentino Cathedral, Mati, Davao Oriental	February 16, 1984	2,443 km² Davao Oriental	369,160
Davao		Diocese of Tagum Dioecesis Tagamna	Medel Aseo (since June 20, 2018)	Christ the King Cathedral, Tagum, Davao del Norte	January 13, 1962	8,090 km² Davao de Oro and Davao del Norte (excluding Samal and Talaingod)	1,384,000
Jaro		Archdiocese of Jaro Archidioecesis Iarensis o S. Elisabeth	Midyphil Billones (since April 2, 2025)	National Shrine of Our Lady of Candles and Metropolitan Cathedral of Saint Elizabeth of Hungary, Iloilo City	May 27, 1865	5,304 km² Guimaras, Iloilo and Iloilo City	3,082,540
Jaro		Diocese of Bacolod Dioecesis Bacolodensis	Louie Galbines (since August 11, 2026)	San Sebastian Cathedral, Bacolod San Diego Pro-Cathedral, Silay, Negros Occidental (pro-cathedral)	July 15, 1932	2,019 km² Bacolod and parts of Negros Occidental (3rd District and 4th District, including Hinigaran)	1,309,520
Jaro		Diocese of Kabankalan Dioecesis Cabancalensis	Sede vacante (since May 14, 2026) Midyphil Billones (Apostolic administrator since August 11, 2026)	Cathedral of Saint Francis Xavier, Kabankalan, Negros Occidental	March 30, 1987	3,924 km² Parts of Negros Occidental (5th District and 6th District, excluding Hinigaran)	785,657
Jaro		Diocese of San Carlos Dioecesis Sancti Caroli Borromeo	Gerardo Alminaza (since November 14, 2013)	San Carlos Borromeo Cathedral Parish, San Carlos, Negros Occidental	March 30, 1987	3,041 km² Parts of Negros Occidental (1st District and 2nd District) and parts of Negros Oriental (Canlaon, Guihulngan, La Libertad and Vallehermoso)	992,732
Jaro		Diocese of San Jose de Antique Dioecesis Sancti Iosephi de Antiquonia	Marvyn Maceda (since April 9, 2019)	Saint Joseph the Worker Cathedral, San Jose de Buenavista, Antique	March 24, 1962	2,552 km² Antique	499,000
Lingayen–Dagupan		Archdiocese of Lingayen–Dagupan Archidioecesis Lingayensis–Dagupanensis	Socrates Villegas OP (since November 4, 2009) Fidelis Layog T.O.Carm (Auxiliary bishop since May 8, 2019)	Metropolitan Cathedral of Saint John the Evangelist, Dagupan Co-Cathedral Parish of the Epiphany of Our Lord, Lingayen, Pangasinan (co-cathedral)	May 19, 1928	1,565 km² Dagupan and parts of Pangasinan (3rd District and 4th District, including Basista, Bautista, Binmaley, Laoac, Lingayen and Urbiztondo)	1,232,511
Lingayen–Dagupan		Diocese of Alaminos Dioecesis Alaminensis	Napoleon Sipalay OP (since March 19, 2024)	Saint Joseph the Patriarch Cathedral Parish, Alaminos, Pangasinan	January 12, 1985	2,449 km² Parts of Pangasinan (1st District, including Aguilar, Bugallon, Labrador and Mangatarem)	660,545
Lingayen–Dagupan		Diocese of Cabanatuan Dioecesis Cabanatuanensis	Prudencio Andaya Jr. CICM (since February 3, 2025)	Saint Nicholas of Tolentine Parish Cathedral, Cabanatuan, Nueva Ecija	February 16, 1963	2,744 km² Parts of Nueva Ecija (3rd District and 4th District, including Aliaga, Talavera and Zaragoza)	1,036,081
Lingayen–Dagupan		Diocese of San Fernando de La Union Dioecesis Ferdinandopolitana ab Unione	Daniel Presto (since August 2, 2018)	Saint William the Hermit Cathedral, San Fernando, La Union	January 19, 1970	1,493 km² La Union	690,339
Lingayen–Dagupan		Diocese of San Jose, Nueva Ecija Dioecesis Sancti Iosephi in Insulis Philippinis	Samuel Agcaracar SVD (since February 6, 2026)	Saint Joseph the Worker Cathedral, San Jose, Nueva Ecija	February 16, 1984	2,540 km² Parts of Nueva Ecija (1st District and 2nd District, excluding Aliaga, Talavera and Zaragoza)	636,422
Lingayen–Dagupan		Diocese of Urdaneta Dioecesis Urdanetensis	Nick Vaquilar (since July 28, 2026)	Our Lady of the Immaculate Conception Cathedral, Urdaneta, Pangasinan	January 12, 1985	1,616 km² Parts of Pangasinan (6th District, including Alcala, Binalonan, Pozorrubio, Sison, Urdaneta and Villasis)	702,058
Lipa		Archdiocese of Lipa Archidioecesis Lipensis	Gilbert Garcera (since April 21, 2017)	Metropolitan Cathedral of San Sebastian, Lipa, Batangas	April 10, 1910	3,166 km² Batangas	3,337,746
Lipa		Diocese of Boac Dioecesis Boacensis	Edwin Panergo (since December 2, 2025)	Immaculate Conception Cathedral Parish, Boac, Marinduque	April 2, 1977	960 km² Marinduque	257,064
Lipa		Diocese of Calapan Dioecesis Calapanensis	Moises Cuevas (since August 7, 2026)	Santo Niño Cathedral, Calapan, Oriental Mindoro	July 2, 1936	4,365 km² Oriental Mindoro	941,240
Lipa		Diocese of Gumaca Dioecesis Gumacana	Euginius Cañete MJ (since January 4, 2025)	San Diego de Alcala Cathedral, Gumaca, Quezon	April 9, 1984	3,666 km² Parts of Quezon (3rd District and 4th District, excluding Agdangan, Atimonan, Padre Burgos, Plaridel and Unisan)	909,321
Lipa		Diocese of Lucena Dioecesis Lucenensis	Mel Rey Uy (since November 8, 2017)	Saint Ferdinand Cathedral, Lucena	March 28, 1950	2,335 km² Parts of Quezon (2nd District, including Agdangan, Atimonan, Lucban, Mauban. Padre Burgos, Pagbilao, Plaridel, Sampaloc, Tayabas and Unisan)	939,506
Lipa		Territorial Prelature of Infanta Praelatura Territorialis Infantensis	Dave Capucao (since September 5, 2025)	Saint Mark Cathedral, Infanta, Quezon	April 25, 1950	7,189 km² Aurora and parts of Quezon (1st District, excluding Lucban, Mauban, Pagbilao, Sampaloc and Tayabas)	373,000
Manila		Archdiocese of Manila Archidioecesis Manilensis	Jose Advincula OP (since June 24, 2021)	Minor Basilica and Metropolitan Cathedral of the Immaculate Conception, Manila	February 6, 1579	117 km² Makati. Mandaluyong, Manila, Pasay, San Juan, part of Quezon City (EDSA Shrine) and parts of Taguig (Embo barangays)	2,694,960
Manila		Diocese of Antipolo Dioecesis Antipolensis	Ruperto Santos (since July 22, 2023)	International Shrine of Our Lady of Peace and Good Voyage, Antipolo, Rizal	January 24, 1983	1,828 km² Marikina, Rizal	3,026,699
Manila		Diocese of Cubao Dioecesis Cubaoensis	Elias Ayuban CMF (since December 3, 2024)	Immaculate Conception Cathedral of Cubao, Quezon City	June 28, 2003	76 km² Parts of Quezon City (1st District, 3rd District, 4th District and 6th District, excluding Camp Aguinaldo, Matandang Balara, Pasong Tamo, Sauyo, Talipapa, southern part of Bagong Lipunan ng Crame, northern part of Culiat, northern part of Tandang Sora and EDSA Shrine)	1,478,766
Manila		Diocese of Imus Dioecesis Imusensis	Reynaldo Evangelista OFS (since June 5, 2013)	Diocesan Shrine and Parish of Our Lady of the Pillar, Imus, Cavite	November 25, 1961	1,288 km² Cavite	3,500,260
Manila		Diocese of Kalookan Dioecesis Kalookana	Pablo Virgilio David (since January 2, 2016)	San Roque Cathedral Parish, Caloocan	June 28, 2003	45 km² Malabon, Navotas and parts of Caloocan (2nd District, including Barangays 77–85 and 132–163)	1,831,719
Manila		Diocese of Malolos Dioecesis Malolosinae	Dennis Villarojo (since August 21, 2019)	Immaculate Conception Parish Cathedral and Minor Basilica, Malolos, Bulacan	November 25, 1961	2,843 km² Bulacan and Valenzuela	3,757,226
Manila		Diocese of Novaliches Dioecesis Novalichesinsis	Roberto Gaa (since August 24, 2019)	Cathedral Shrine and Parish of the Good Shepherd, Quezon City	December 7, 2002	138 km² Parts of Caloocan (1st District and 3rd District, excluding Barangays 77–85 and 132–163) and parts of Quezon City (2nd District and 5th District, including Matandang Balara, Pasong Tamo, Sauyo, Talipapa, northern part of Culiat and northern part of Tandang Sora)	2,500,327
Manila		Diocese of Parañaque Dioecesis Paranaquensis	Sede vacante (since June 6, 2026) Elias Ayuban CMF (Apostolic administrator since June 6, 2026)	Cathedral Parish of Saint Andrew the Apostle, Parañaque	December 7, 2002	127 km² Las Piñas, Muntinlupa and Parañaque	1,504,036
Manila		Diocese of Pasig Dioecesis Pasigina	Mylo Hubert Vergara (since June 23, 2011)	Immaculate Conception Cathedral, Pasig	June 28, 2003	78 km² Pasig, Pateros and Taguig (excluding Embo barangays)	1,756,388
Manila		Diocese of San Pablo Dioecesis Sancti Pauli in Insulis Philippinis	Marcelino Antonio Maralit (since November 21, 2024)	Cathedral Parish of Saint Paul the First Hermit, San Pablo, Laguna	November 28, 1966	1,918 km² Laguna	3,115,119
Nueva Segovia		Archdiocese of Nueva Segovia Archidioecesis Novae Segobiae	David William Antonio (since January 14, 2026)	Metropolitan Cathedral and Parish of the Conversion of Saint Paul the Apostle, Vigan, Ilocos Sur	August 14, 1595	2,580 km² Ilocos Sur	642,183
Nueva Segovia		Diocese of Baguio Dioecesis Baghiopolitana	Rafael T. Cruz (since September 17, 2024)	Cathedral Shrine of Our Lady of the Atonement, Baguio	July 15, 1932	2,827 km² Baguio and Benguet	601,130
Nueva Segovia		Diocese of Bangued Dioecesis Banguedensis	Sede vacante (since November 7, 2026) Liberato Ortega (Administrator since November 10, 2026)	Saint James the Elder Cathedral Parish, Bangued, Abra	June 12, 1955	3,976 km² Abra	225,637
Nueva Segovia		Diocese of Laoag Dioecesis Laoagensis	Renato Mayugba (since December 11, 2012)	Saint William's Cathedral, Laoag, Ilocos Norte	June 5, 1961	3,976 km² Ilocos Norte	374,623
Ozamis		Archdiocese of Ozamis Archidioecesis Ozamisana	Martin Jumoad (since November 30, 2016)	Metropolitan Cathedral of the Immaculate Conception, Ozamiz, Misamis Occidental	January 28, 1951	2,055 km² Misamis Occidental	447,471
Ozamis		Diocese of Dipolog Dioecesis Dipologana	Severo Caermare (since July 25, 2014)	Our Lady of the Most Holy Rosary Cathedral Parish, Dipolog, Zamboanga del Norte	July 31, 1967	7,301 km² Zamboanga del Norte	726,168
Ozamis		Diocese of Iligan Dioecesis Iliganensis	Jose Rapadas III (since June 13, 2019)	Saint Michael's Cathedral, Iligan	February 17, 1971	3,092 km² Iligan and Lanao del Norte (excluding Sultan Naga Dimaporo and Balo-i)	716,993
Ozamis		Diocese of Pagadian Dioecesis Pagadianensis	Ronald Timoner (since August 13, 2025)	Cathedral of the Most Holy Name of Jesus, Pagadian, Zamboanga del Sur	November 12, 1971	2,861 km² Zamboanga del Sur (except Bayog, Kumalarang and Lakewood)	1,098,000
Ozamis		Territorial Prelature of Marawi Praelatura Territorialis Maraviensis	Edwin de la Peña M.S.P (since December 27, 2001)	Cathedral of Maria Auxiliadora, Marawi, Lanao del Sur	November 20, 1976	4,567 km² Lanao del Sur and parts of Lanao del Norte (Sultan Naga Dimaporo and Balo-i)	38,800
Palo		Archdiocese of Palo Archidioecesis Palensis	John F. Du (since May 9, 2012)	Metropolitan Cathedral of Our Lord's Transfiguration, Palo, Leyte	November 28, 1937	4,620 km² Leyte (excluding Bato, Baybay, Calubian, Hilongos, Hindang, Inopacan, Leyte, Matalom, San Isidro and Tabango)	1,519,171
Palo		Diocese of Borongan Dioecesis Boronganensis	Sede vacante (since September 10, 2026) Jan Michael Gadicho (Administrator since November 3, 2026)	Cathedral Parish of the Nativity of the Blessed Virgin Mary, Borongan, Eastern Samar	October 22, 1960	4,641 km² Eastern Samar	472,168
Palo		Diocese of Calbayog Dioecesis Calbayogana	Isabelo Caiban Abarquez (since March 8, 2007)	Saints Peter and Paul Cathedral, Calbayog, Samar	April 10, 1910	5,591 km² Samar	745,592
Palo		Diocese of Catarman Dioecesis Catarmaniensis	Nolly C. Buco (since January 15, 2025)	Our Lady of the Annunciation Cathedral Parish, Catarman, Northern Samar	December 5, 1974	3,693 km² Northern Samar	639,679
Palo		Diocese of Naval Dioecesis Navaliensis	Rex Ramirez (since January 12, 2018)	Our Lady of the Most Holy Rosary Cathedral, Naval, Biliran	November 29, 1988	1,162 km² Biliran and parts of Leyte (Calubian, Leyte, San Isidro and Tabango)	336,713
San Fernando		Archdiocese of San Fernando Archidioecesis Sancti Ferdinandi	Florentino Lavarias (since October 27, 2014)	Metropolitan Cathedral of San Fernando, San Fernando, Pampanga	December 11, 1948	2,180 km² Angeles City and Pampanga	2,535,615
San Fernando		Diocese of Balanga Dioecesis Balangensis	Rufino Sescon OP (since March 1, 2025)	Cathedral-Shrine Parish of Saint Joseph, Balanga, Bataan	March 17, 1975	1,373 km² Bataan	690,890
San Fernando		Diocese of Iba Dioecesis Ibana	Bartolome G. Santos (since May 25, 2018)	Saint Augustine Cathedral Parish, Iba, Zambales	June 12, 1955	2,180 km² Olongapo and Zambales	739,793
San Fernando		Diocese of Tarlac Dioecesis Tarlacensis	Roberto Mallari (since March 27, 2025)	San Sebastian Cathedral Parish, Tarlac City, Tarlac	February 16, 1963	3,642 km² Tarlac	1,202,764
Tuguegarao		Archdiocese of Tuguegarao Archidioecesis Tuguegaraoana	Ricardo Baccay (since January 14, 2020)	Saint Peter Metropolitan Cathedral, Tuguegarao, Cagayan	April 10, 1910	9,296 km² Cagayan	1,650,000
Tuguegarao		Diocese of Bayombong Dioecesis Bayombongensis	Jose Elmer Mangalinao (since July 25, 2018)	Saint Dominic de Guzman Cathedral, Bayombong, Nueva Vizcaya	November 7, 1966	6,961 km² Nueva Vizcaya and Quirino	654,000
Tuguegarao		Diocese of Ilagan Dioecesis Ilaganensis	Sede vacante (since November 4, 2025) Edmundo Castañeda Jr. (Administrator since January 19, 2026)	Cathedral of Saint Michael the Archangel, Gamu, Isabela Co-Cathedral of Saint Ferdinand, Ilagan, Isabela (co-cathedral)	January 31, 1970	12,414 km² Isabela	1,187,935
Tuguegarao		Territorial Prelature of Batanes Praelatura Territorialis Batanensis	Danilo Ulep (since March 27, 2025)	Cathedral of the Immaculate Conception, Basco, Batanes	November 30, 1950	784 km² Batanes	18,089
Zamboanga		Archdiocese of Zamboanga Archidioecesis Zamboangensis	Julius Tonel (since August 22, 2023)	Metropolitan Cathedral of the Immaculate Conception, Zamboanga City	April 10, 1910	1,483 km² Zamboanga City	707,170
Zamboanga		Diocese of Ipil Dioecesis Ipilensis	Glenn Corsiga (since August 14, 2025)	Saint Joseph the Worker Cathedral Parist, Ipil, Zamboanga Sibugay	December 24, 1979	4,850 km² Zamboanga Sibugay and parts of Zamboanga del Sur (Bayog, Kumalarang and Lakewood)	582,608
Zamboanga		Territorial Prelature of Isabela Praelatura Territorialis Isabellapolitana	Leo Dalmao CMF (since May 24, 2019)	Santa Isabel de Portugal Cathedral Parish, Isabela, Basilan	October 12, 1963	1,359 km² Basilan	131,560
Apostolic Vicariates		Apostolic Vicariate of Bontoc–Lagawe Vicariatus Apostolicus Bontocensis–Lagavensis	Valentin Cabbigat Dimoc (since August 4, 2015)	Santa Rita de Cascia Cathedral, Bontoc, Mountain Province	July 6, 1992	4,758 km² Ifugao and Mountain Province	210,112
Apostolic Vicariates		Apostolic Vicariate of Jolo Vicariatus Apostolicus Ioloensis	Sede vacante (since September 8, 2025)	Cathedral of Our Lady of Mount Carmel, Jolo, Sulu	October 28, 1953	2,688 km² Sulu and Tawi-Tawi	25,166
Apostolic Vicariates		Apostolic Vicariate of Puerto Princesa Vicariatus Apostolicus Portus Principis in Philippinis	Socrates Mesiona MSP (since February 10, 2017)	Immaculate Conception Cathedral Parish, Puerto Princesa	April 10, 1910	8,552 km² Puerto Princesa and parts of Palawan (2nd District and 3rd District, including Cagayancillo and Kalayaan)	556,391
Apostolic Vicariates		Apostolic Vicariate of San Jose in Mindoro Vicariatus Apostolicus Sancti Iosephi in Mindoro	Pablito Tagura SVD (since February 25, 2023)	Saint Joseph the Worker Cathedral, San Jose, Occidental Mindoro	January 27, 1983	5,866 km² Occidental Mindoro	410,513
Apostolic Vicariates		Apostolic Vicariate of Tabuk Vicariatus Apostolicus Tabukensis	Sean Mejia (since June 2, 2026)	Saint William's Cathedral, Tabuk, Kalinga	July 6, 1992	6,471 km² Apayao and Kalinga	374,175
Apostolic Vicariates		Apostolic Vicariate of Taytay Vicariatus Apostolicus Taytayensis	Broderick Pabillo S.D.B (since August 19, 2021)	Saint Joseph the Worker Cathedral, Taytay, Palawan	May 13, 2002	6,413 km² Parts of Palawan (1st District, excluding Cagayancillo and Kalayaan)	485,952
Military Ordinariate		Military Ordinariate of the Philippines Ordinariatus Militaris Philippinensis	Oscar Jaime Florencio (since April 3, 2019)	Saint Ignatius of Loyola Cathedral, Quezon City Saint Joseph Pro-Cathedral, Quezon City (co-cathedral)	December 8, 1950	Armed Forces of the Philippines, Philippine National Police, Philippine Coast Guard	—

== Gallery of metropolitan cathedrals ==
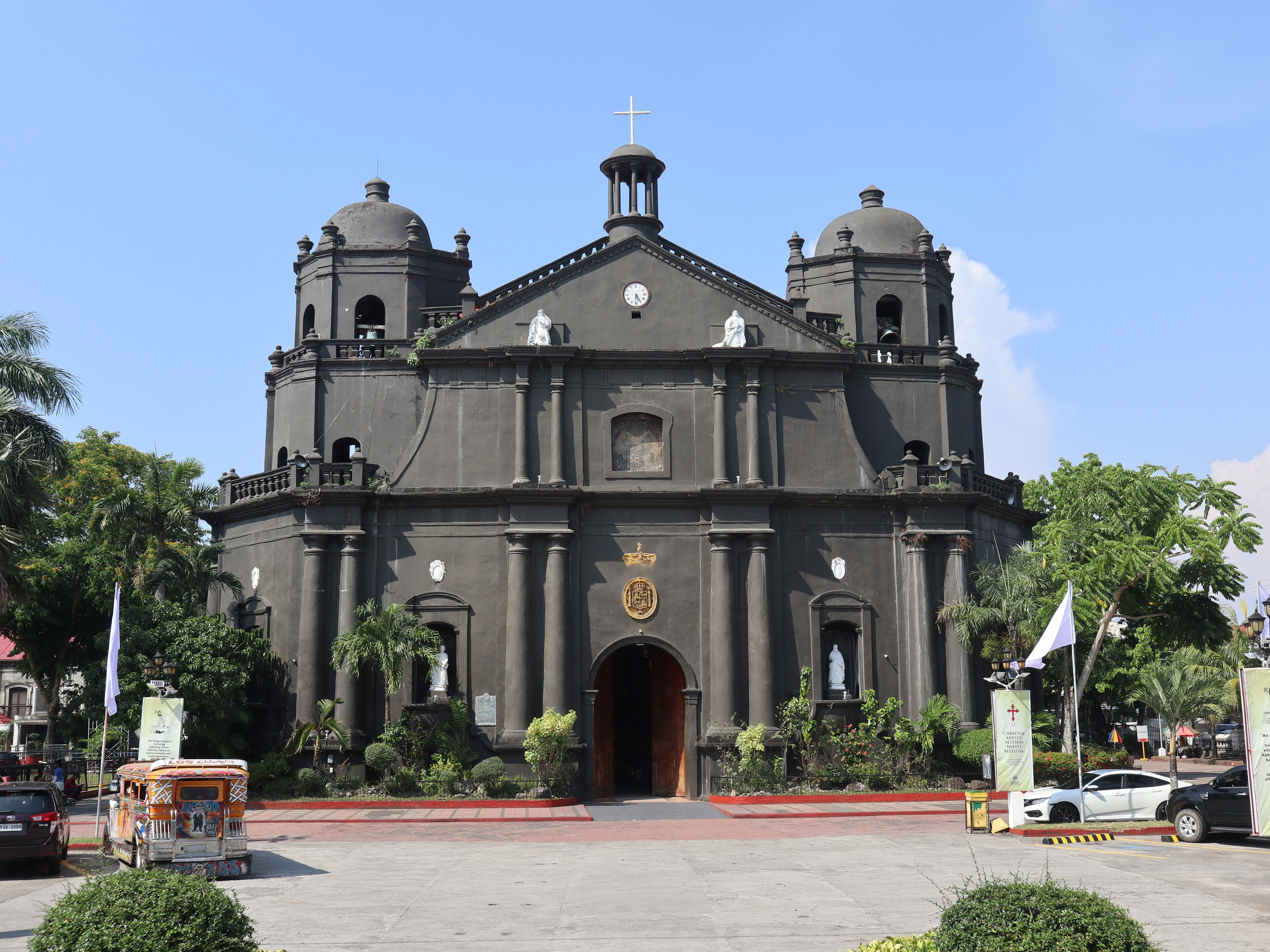
Metropolitan Cathedral of Saint John the Evangelist, seat of the Archdiocese of Caceres

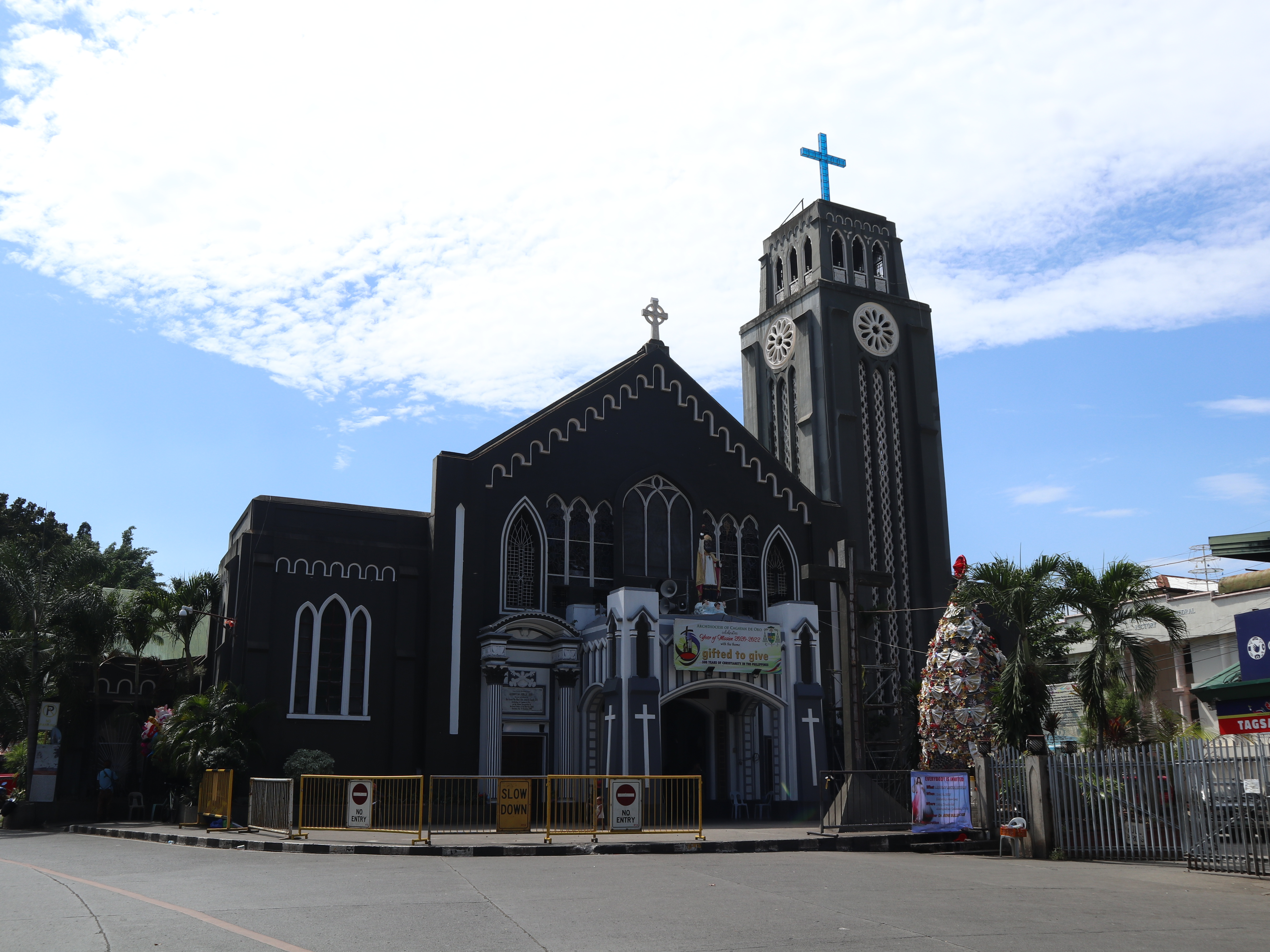
Saint Augustine Metropolitan Cathedral, seat of the Archdiocese of Cagayan de Oro

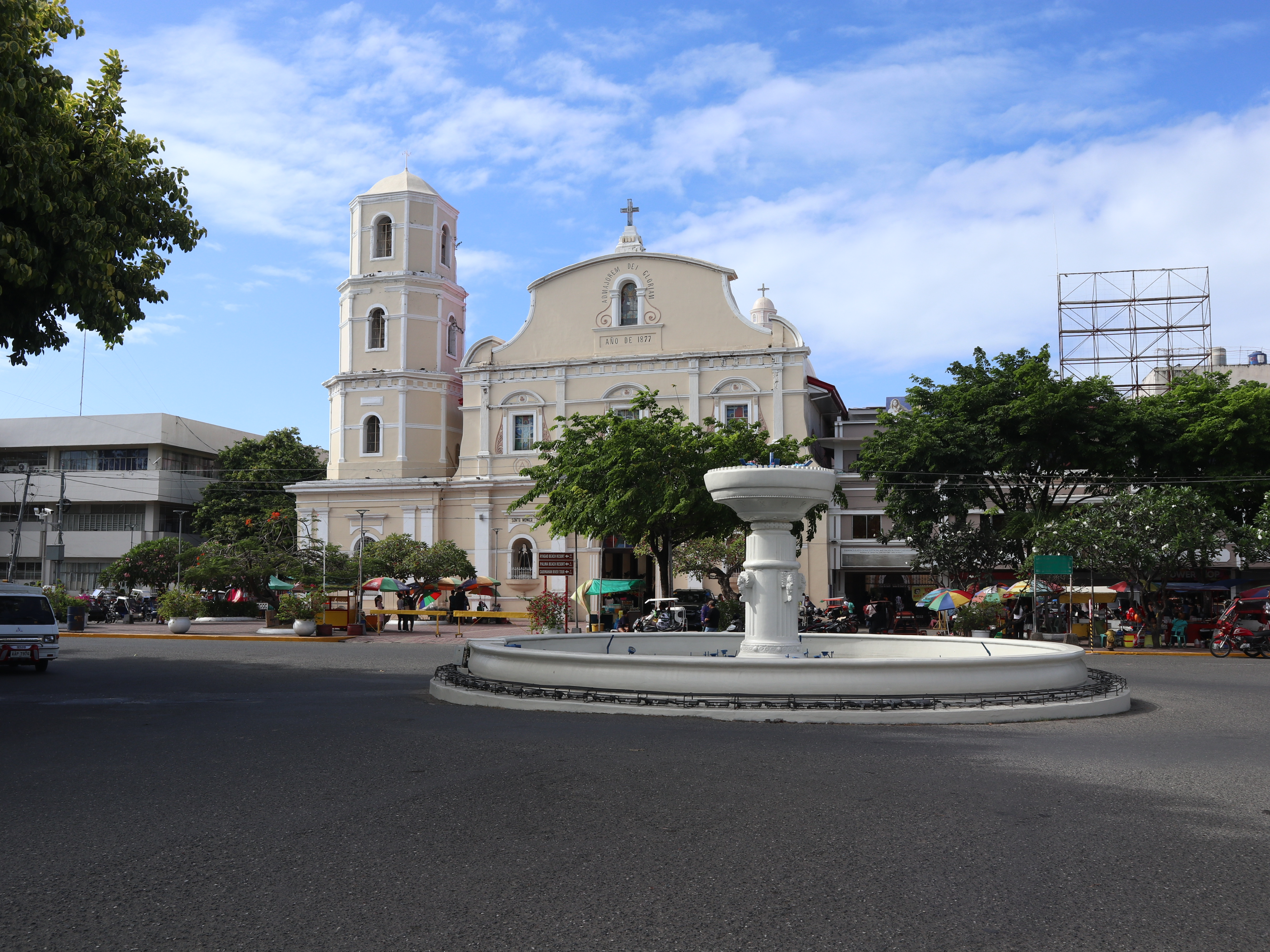
Immaculate Conception Metropolitan Cathedral, seat of the Archdiocese of Capiz

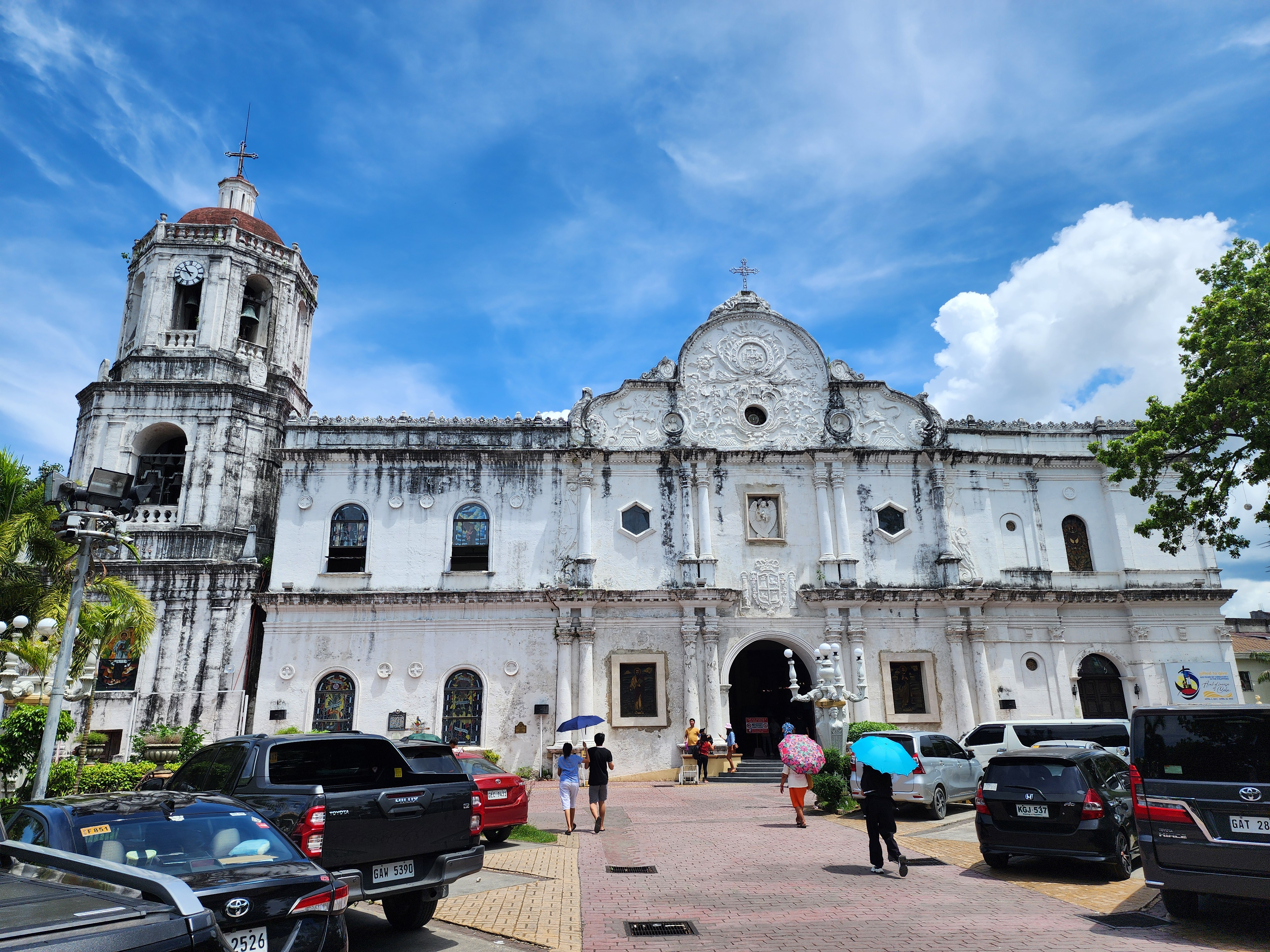
Metropolitan Cathedral and Parish of Saint Vitalis and of the Immaculate Conception, seat of the Archdiocese of Cebu

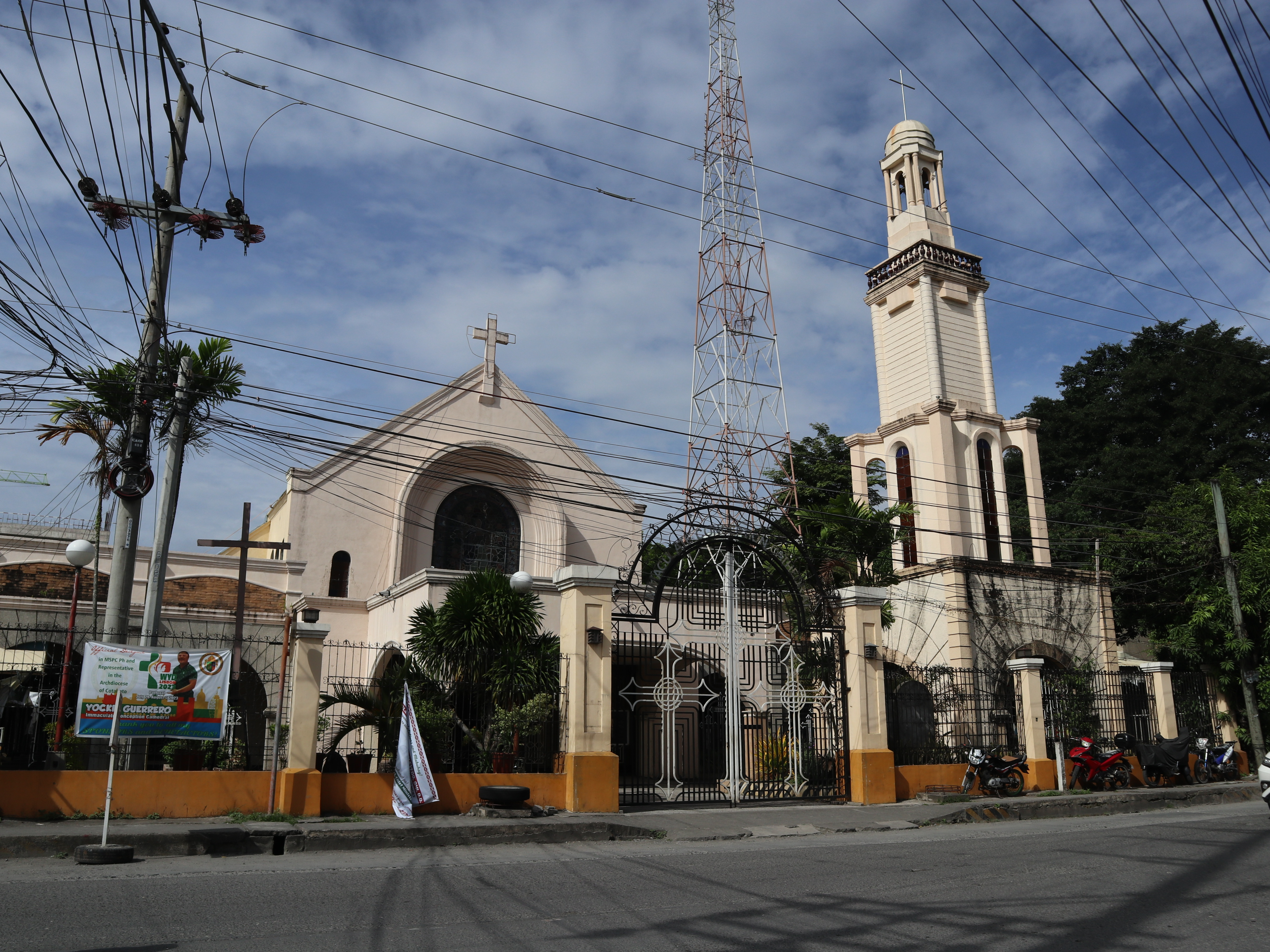
Metropolitan Cathedral and Parish of Our Lady of the Immaculate Conception, seat of the Archdiocese of Cotabato

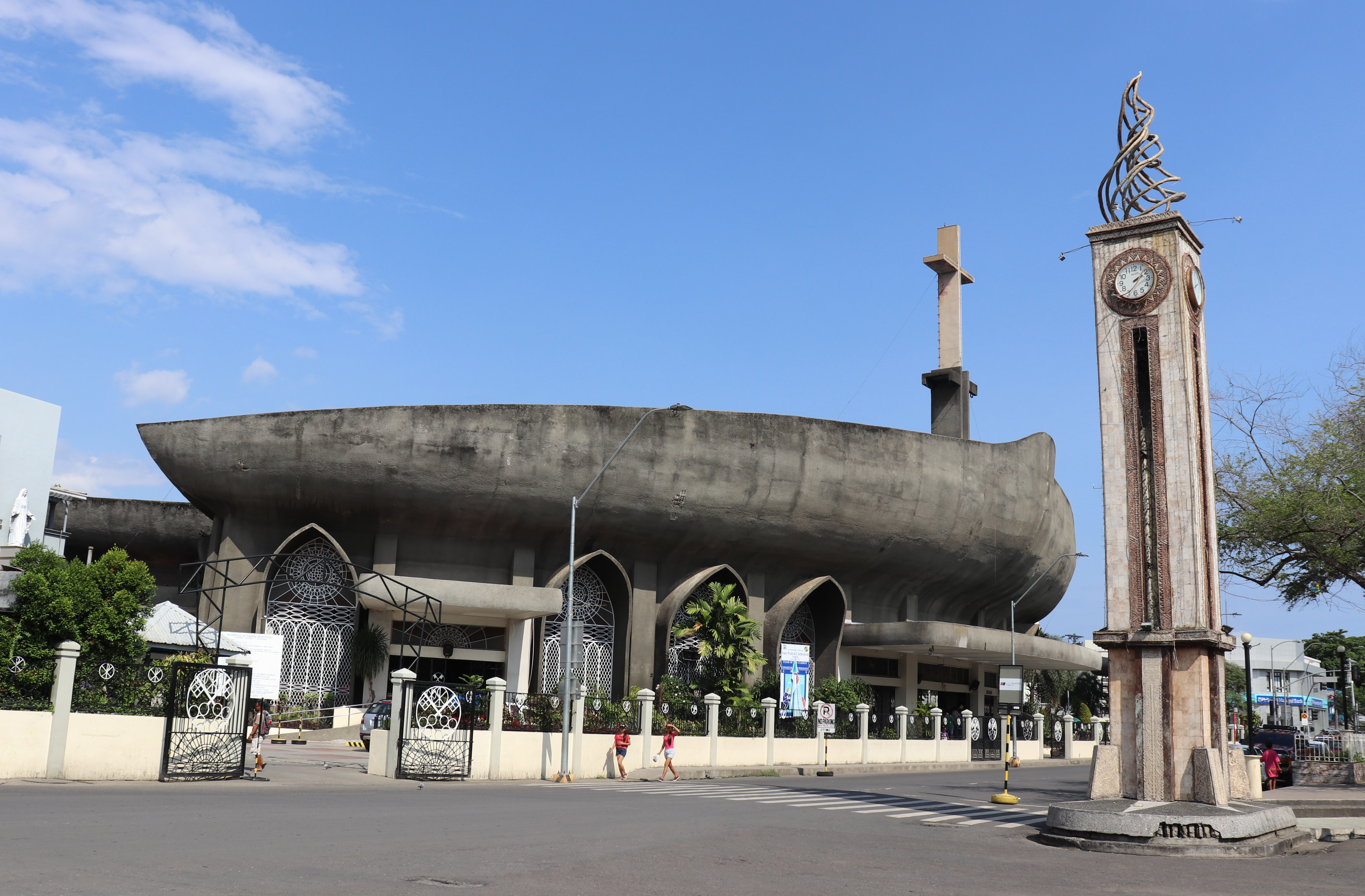
Saint Peter Metropolitan Cathedral, seat of the Archdiocese of Davao

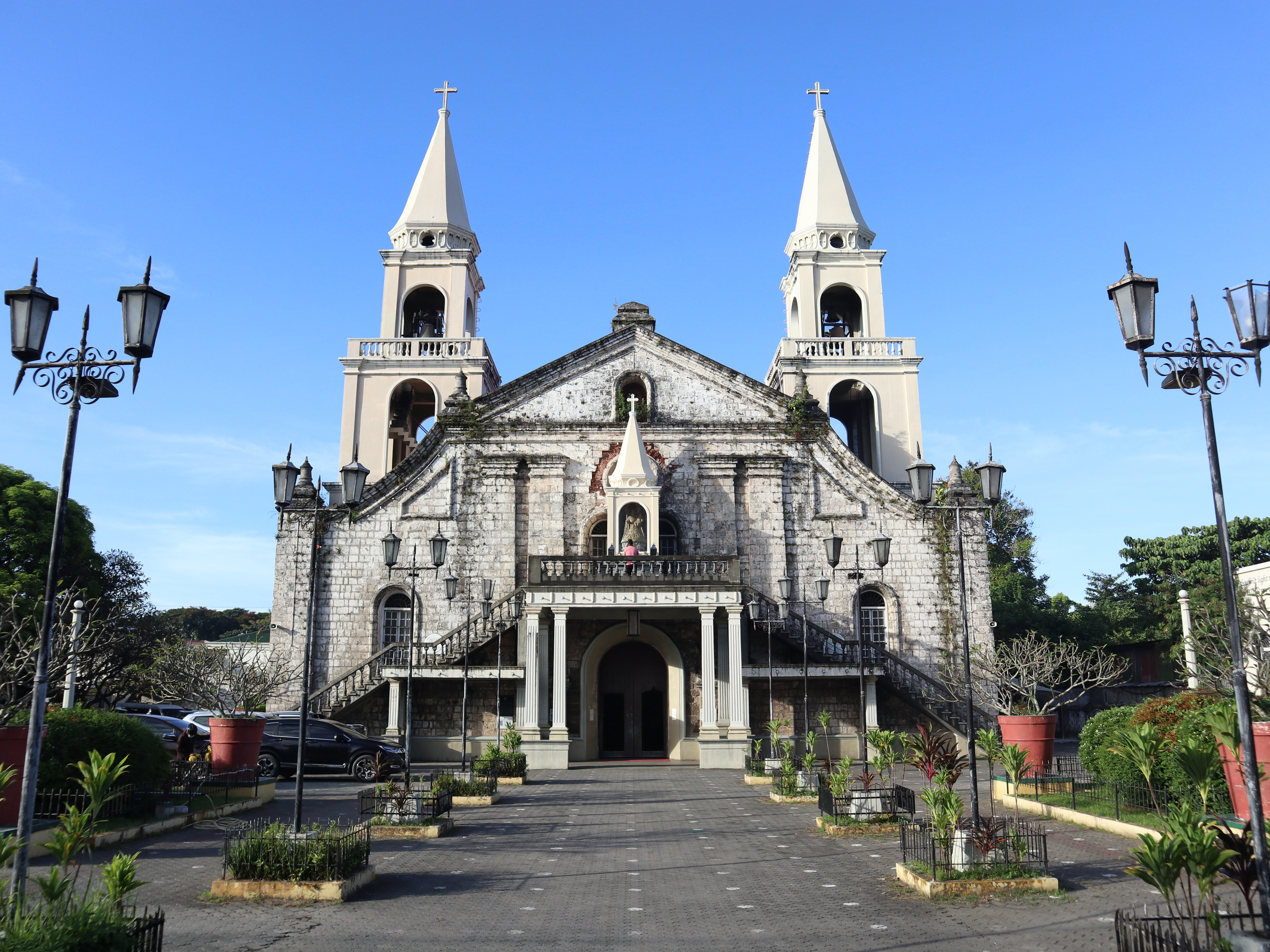
Metropolitan Cathedral of Saint Elizabeth of Hungary (National Shrine of Our Lady of the Candles) seat of the Archdiocese of Jaro

Metropolitan Cathedral of St. John the Evangelist, seat of the Archdiocese of Lingayen-Dagupan

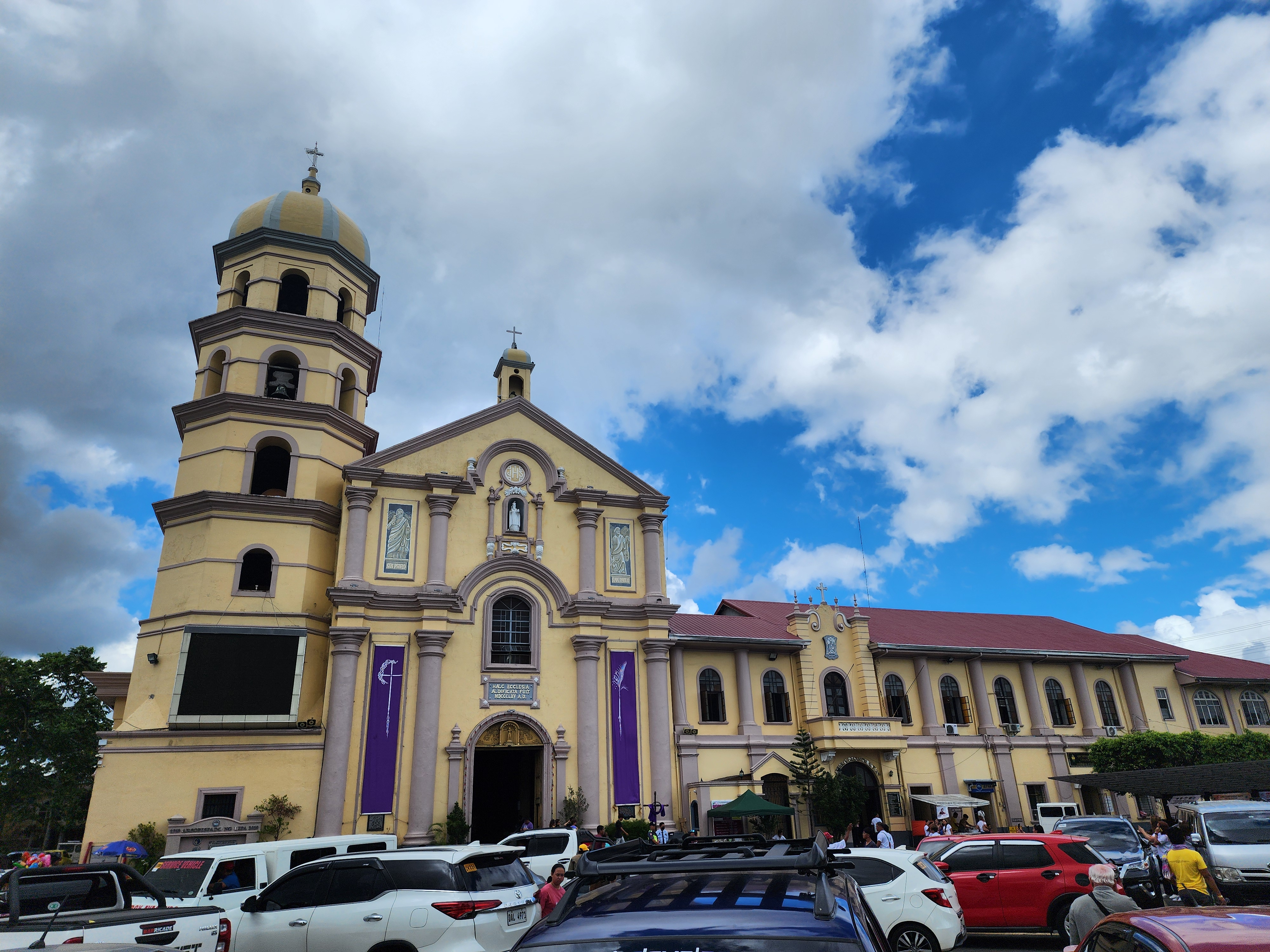
Metropolitan Cathedral of Saint Sebastian, seat of the Archdiocese of Lipa

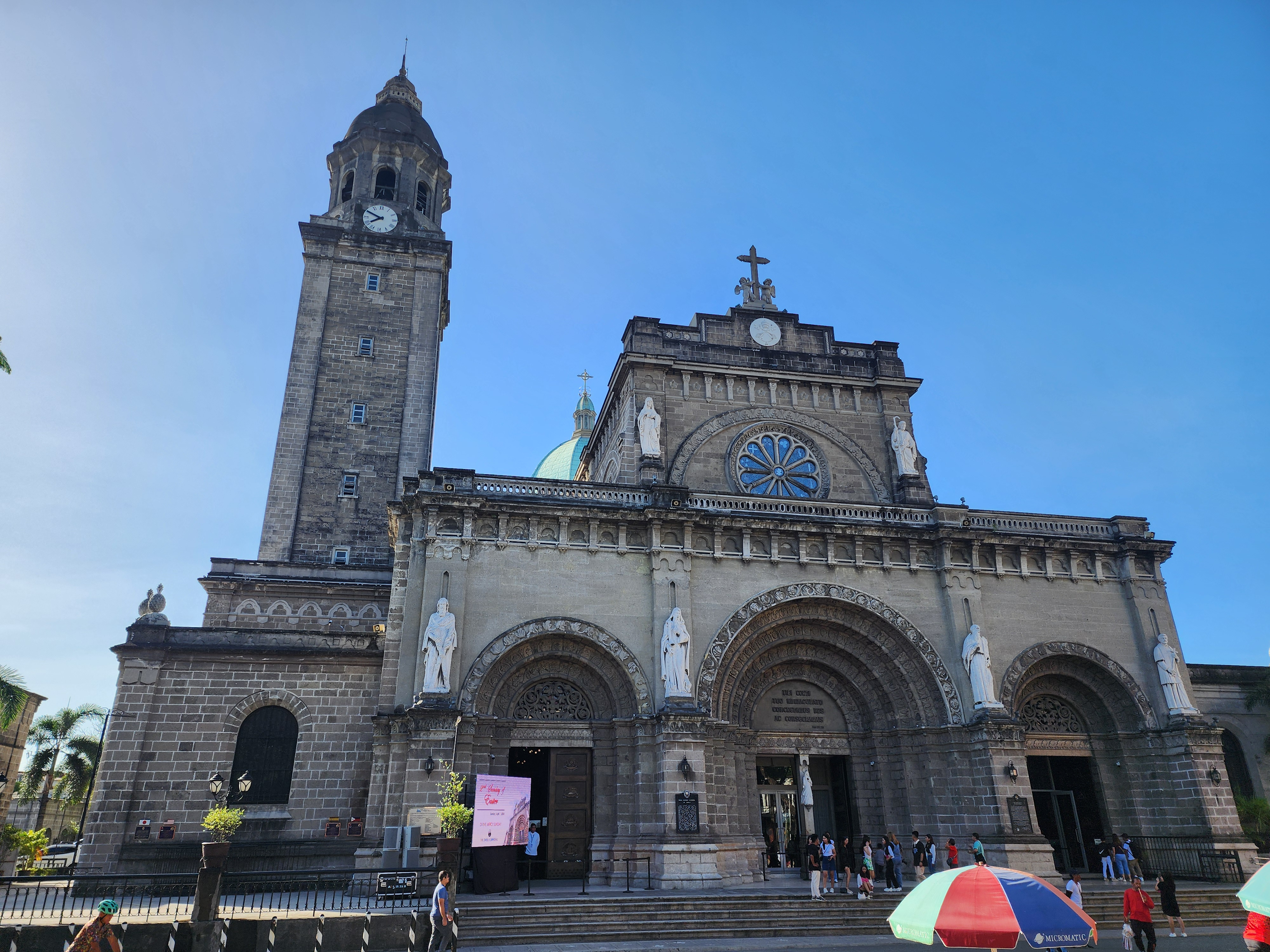
Minor Basilica and Metropolitan Cathedral of the Immaculate Conception, seat of the Archdiocese of Manila

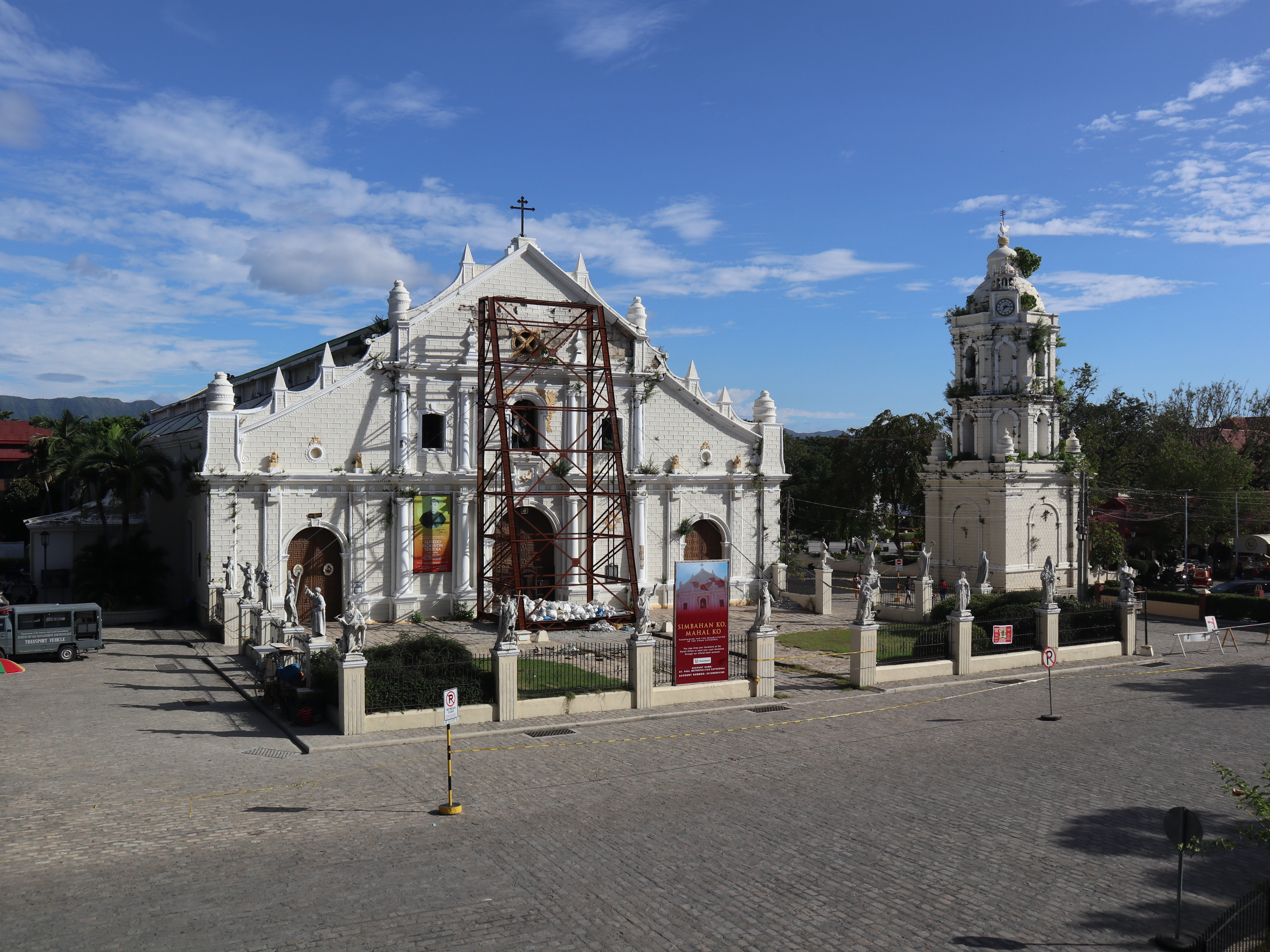
Metropolitan Cathedral of the Conversion of St. Paul the Apostle, seat of the Archdiocese of Nueva Segovia

Metropolitan Cathedral of the Immaculate Conception, seat of the Archdiocese of Ozamis

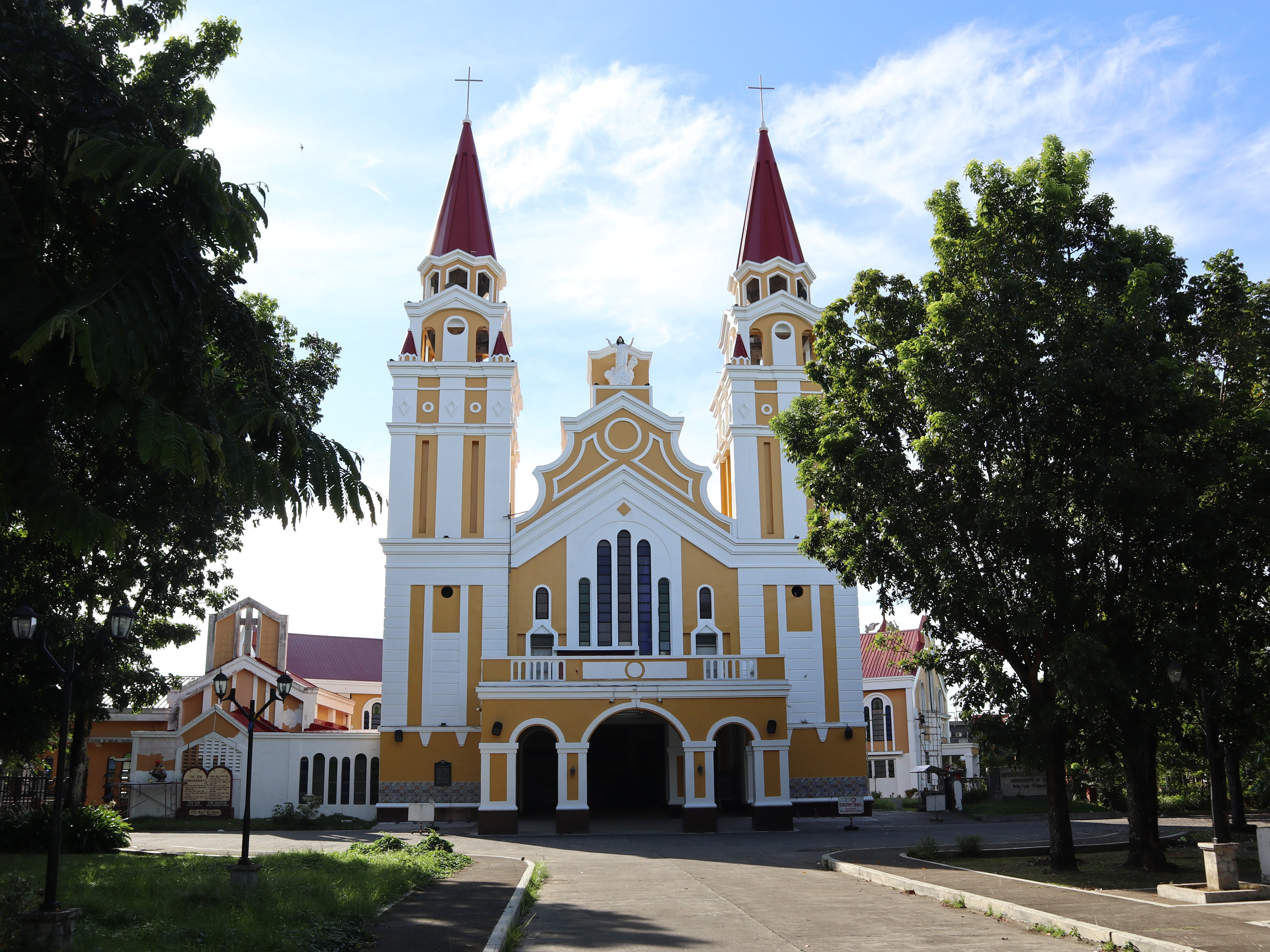
Metropolitan Cathedral of Our Lord's Transfiguration, seat of the Archdiocese of Palo

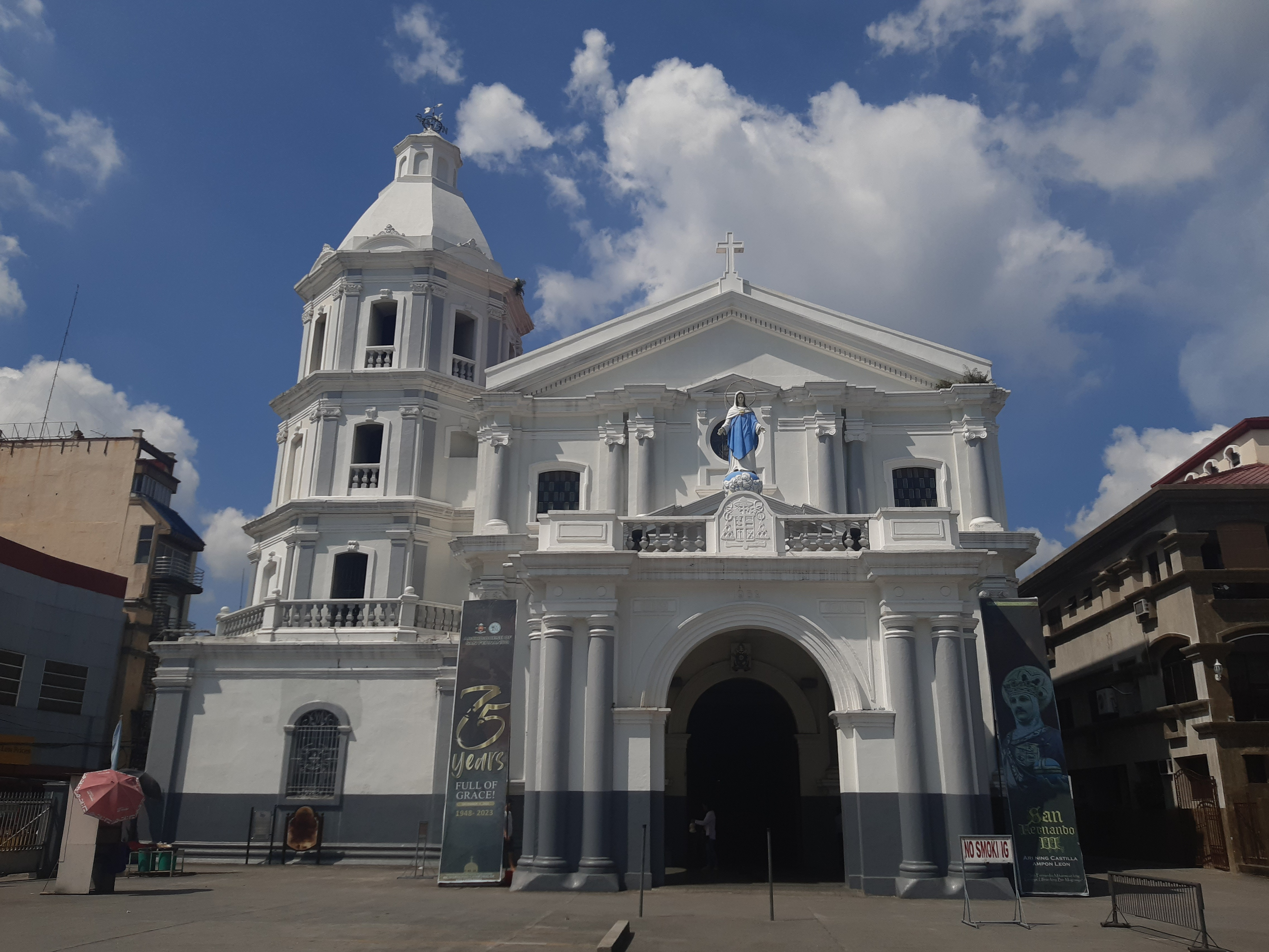
Metropolitan Cathedral of San Fernando, seat of the Archdiocese of San Fernando

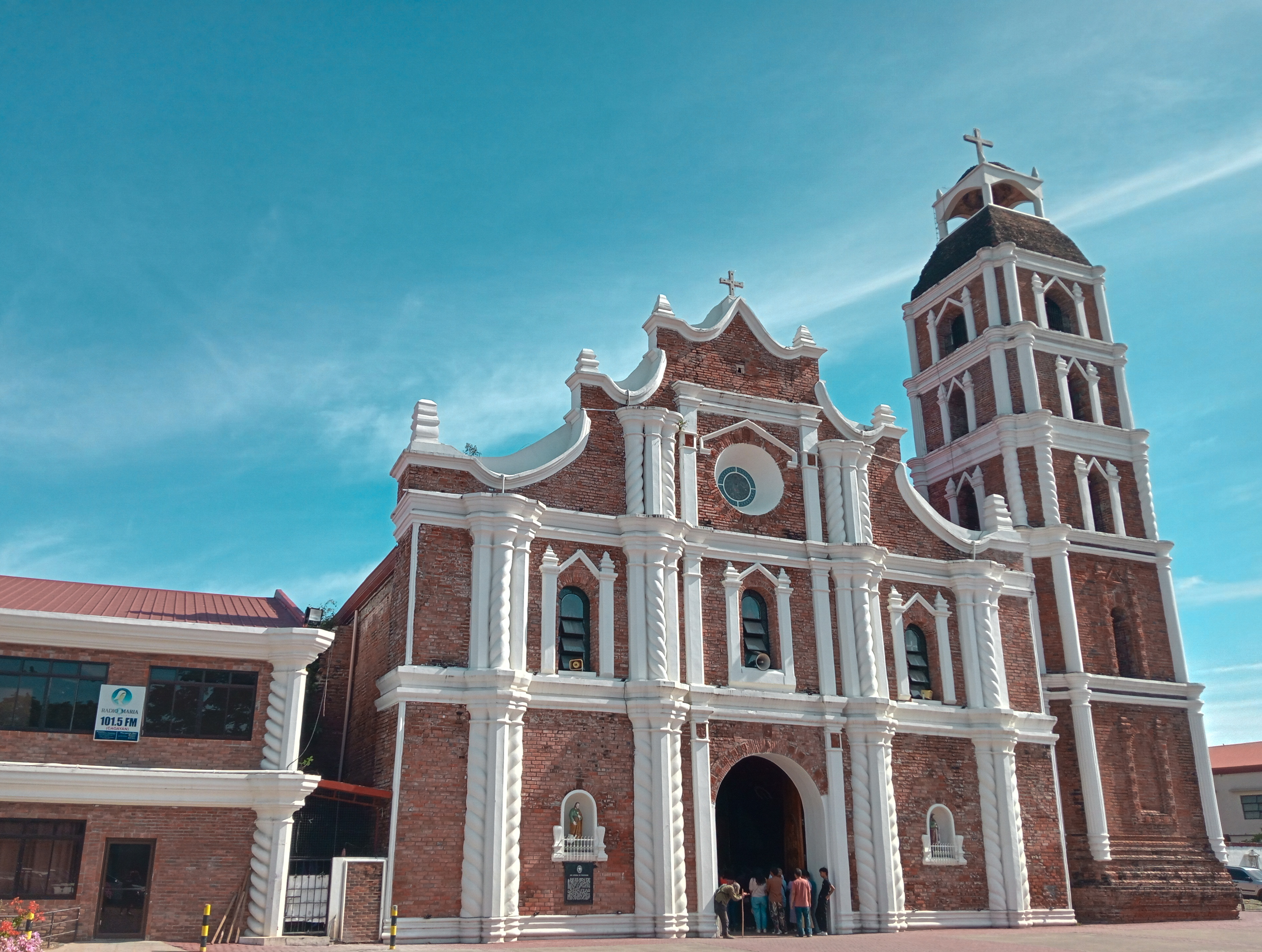
Saint Peter Metropolitan Cathedral, seat of the Archdiocese of Tuguegarao

Metropolitan Cathedral of the Immaculate Conception, seat of the Archdiocese of Zamboanga

== See also ==
- Apostolic Nunciature to the Philippines
- Catholic Church in the Philippines
- List of Catholic bishops in the Philippines
- List of Catholic dioceses (alphabetical)
- List of Catholic dioceses (structured view)
- List of Catholic archdioceses
- Catholic Church hierarchy

== Sources and external links ==
- ClaretianPublications.com; Diocese
- Catholic-Hierarchy entry
- GCatholic.org
