= Tagarata =

Tagarata was a Roman era civitas of the Roman province of Africa Proconsularis. The ancient city has been tentatively identified with ruins at Bir-El-Djedidi, Tunisia.

The ancient city was also the seat of an ancient Christian bishopric, suffragan of the Archdiocese of Carthage. There are three documented bishops of this diocese. The Catholic Lucio and Donatist Quinto both attended the Council of Carthage (411). Honore attended the Council of Carthage (484) called by the Vandal king Huneric, after which Honored was exiled. Today, the see of Tagarata survives as titular bishopric and the bishop is Most Reverend Midyphil Billones, Archbishop of Jaro, Philippines.
