= Saint Joseph Cathedral (Antique) =

- Saint Joseph the Worker Cathedral
- Katedral ni San Jose Manggagawa (Filipino); Catedral de San José Obrero (Spanish)
- Cathedral's facade in 2026

- Location in the Visayas Location in the Philippines
- 10.743°N 121.9423°E
- Location: San Jose de Buenavista, Antique
- Country: Philippines
- Language(s): Karay-a, English
- Denomination: Roman Catholic

History
- Status: Cathedral
- Founded: 1733; 293 years ago
- Dedication: Saint Joseph

Architecture
- Functional status: Active
- Architectural type: Church building

Specifications
- Length: 68.05 m (223.3 ft)
- Width: 15.96 m (52.4 ft)
- Materials: Concrete

Administration
- Metropolis: Jaro
- Diocese: San Jose de Antique
- Deanery: San Jose

Clergy
- Bishop: Most Rev. Marvyn A. Maceda, D.D.

The Saint Joseph the Worker Cathedral or the Saint Joseph Cathedral is a Roman Catholic cathedral and the ecclesiastical seat of the Diocese of San Jose de Antique. It is located in San Jose de Buenavista, Antique, Philippines.

== History ==
The origins of San Jose de Buenavista date back to 1581, when Augustinian missionaries arrived in Hamtic, of which the area was originally a part. The early settlement, known as Tubigon, was situated along the Malandog River, where a stone church was built in 1733 at a site called Maybato Norte. This structure was later destroyed during Moro raids that also affected nearby settlements.

In 1787, Agustin Sumandi was granted the land of Malaiba by Governor-General Carlos Berenguer de Marquina. The settlement remained a visita of Hamtic until 1793, when it was established as an independent parish under Fr. Manuel Ibanez.

In 1796, Tubigon was renamed San Jose in honor of its patron saint through a royal decree, with “Buenavista” (good view) appended to denote its favorable location. By 1802, San Jose became the capital of Antique, and Sumandi was appointed as its first gobernadorcillo.

Following the destruction of the earlier church, the Augustinians relocated to the present site of the cathedral. During the Philippine Revolution, they withdrew from Antique, and the Aglipayan movement spread in the province. In 1906, the Mill Hill Missionaries assumed administration of the parish.

On March 24, 1962, Antique was established as a prelature, with Msgr. Cornelio de Wit as its first bishop-prelate. On November 15, 1982, Pope John Paul II elevated the prelature to the Diocese of San Jose de Antique under the Archdiocese of Jaro, and the parish church was consequently designated as a cathedral. Most Rev. Raul Quimpo Martinez was installed as the first diocesan bishop on March 23, 1983.

== Architecture ==
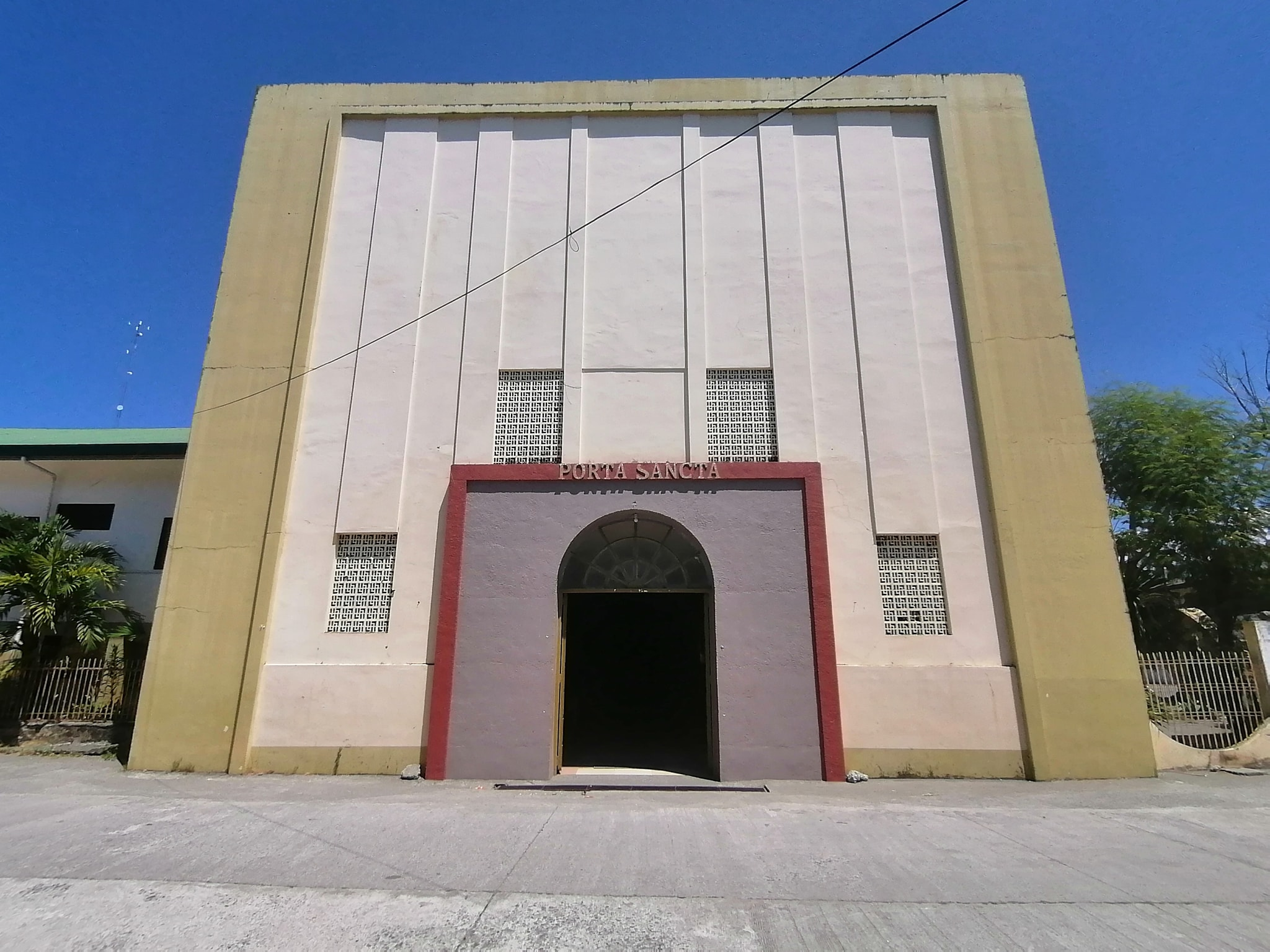
The cathedral's facade in 2022.

The cathedral features a simple, rectilinear façade accented by concrete bands. Its main arched entrance is flanked by pierced walls, while the bell tower is located on the epistle side of the structure.

== Gallery ==
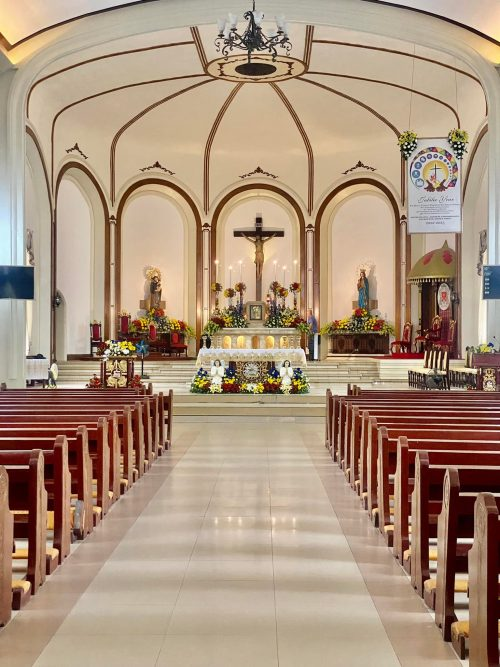
The cathedral's interior showing the reredos.

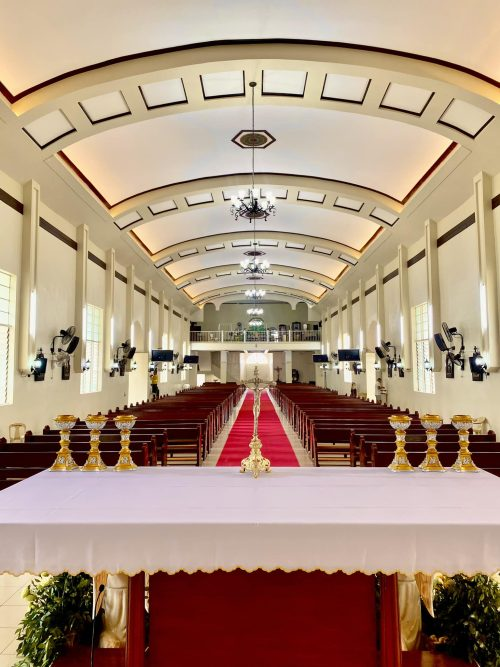
The cathedral's interior viewed from the main altar.

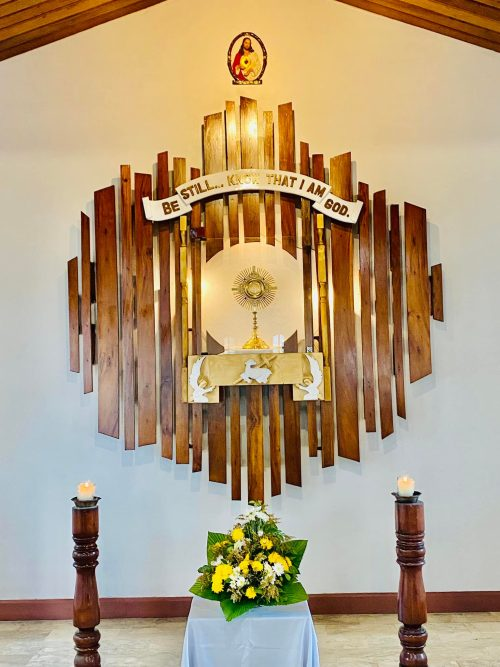
The adoration chapel of the cathedral.

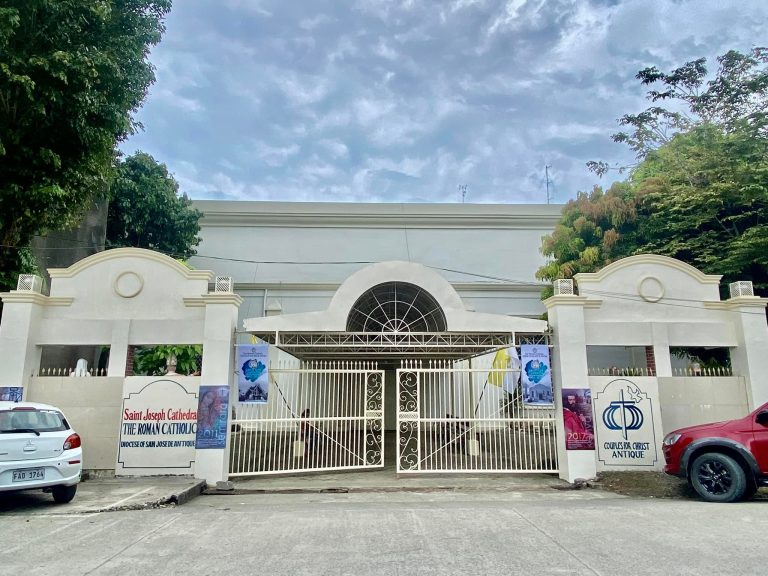
The side entrance of the cathedral.

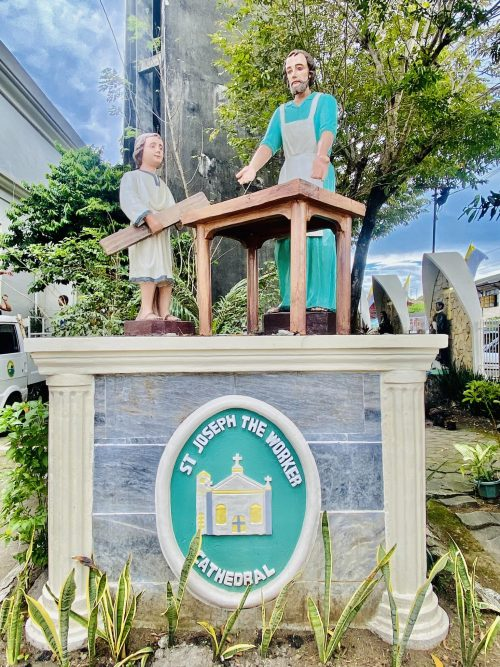
Statue of Saint Joseph with the young Jesus
