= Raul Martirez =

Filipino Roman Catholic bishop (1938–2024)

The Most Reverend Raul Martirez
- Bishop Emeritus of San Jose de Antique
- See: San Jose de Antique
- Installed: January 5, 1983
- Term ended: March 16, 2002
- Predecessor: Cornelius de Wit
- Successor: Romulo Tolentino de la Cruz

Orders
- Ordination: 18 March 1961
- Consecration: 24 March 1983 by Bruno Torpigliani

Personal details
- Born: Raul José Quimpo Martirez; February 9, 1938 New Washington, Aklan, Commonwealth of the Philippines
- Died: September 2, 2024 (aged 86) Pasig, Philippines
- Denomination: Roman Catholic
- Motto: TESTIFICOR
- Coat of arms

Styles of Raul José Martirez
- Reference style: The Most Reverend
- Spoken style: Your Excellency
- Religious style: Bishop

Raul José Quimpo Martirez (February 9, 1938 – September 2, 2024) was a Filipino Roman Catholic prelate. He was bishop of San Jose de Antique from 1983 to 2002.

He was ordained a priest in 1961 and became a bishop in 1983. After his term in Antique, he became resident bishop of Christ the King Parish Greenmeadows in Quezon City.

Martirez died from a stroke in Pasig, on September 2, 2024, at the age of 86.

Catholic Church titles
Preceded by Cornelius de Wit	Bishop of San Jose de Antique; 1983–2002	Succeeded by Romulo Tolentino de la Cruz
