= Diocese of San Jose de Antique =

Roman Catholic diocese in the Philippines

Diocese of San Jose de Antique Dioecesis Sancti Iosephi de Antiquonia Diosesis kang San Jose de Antique Diyosesis ng San Jose de Antique

Catholic
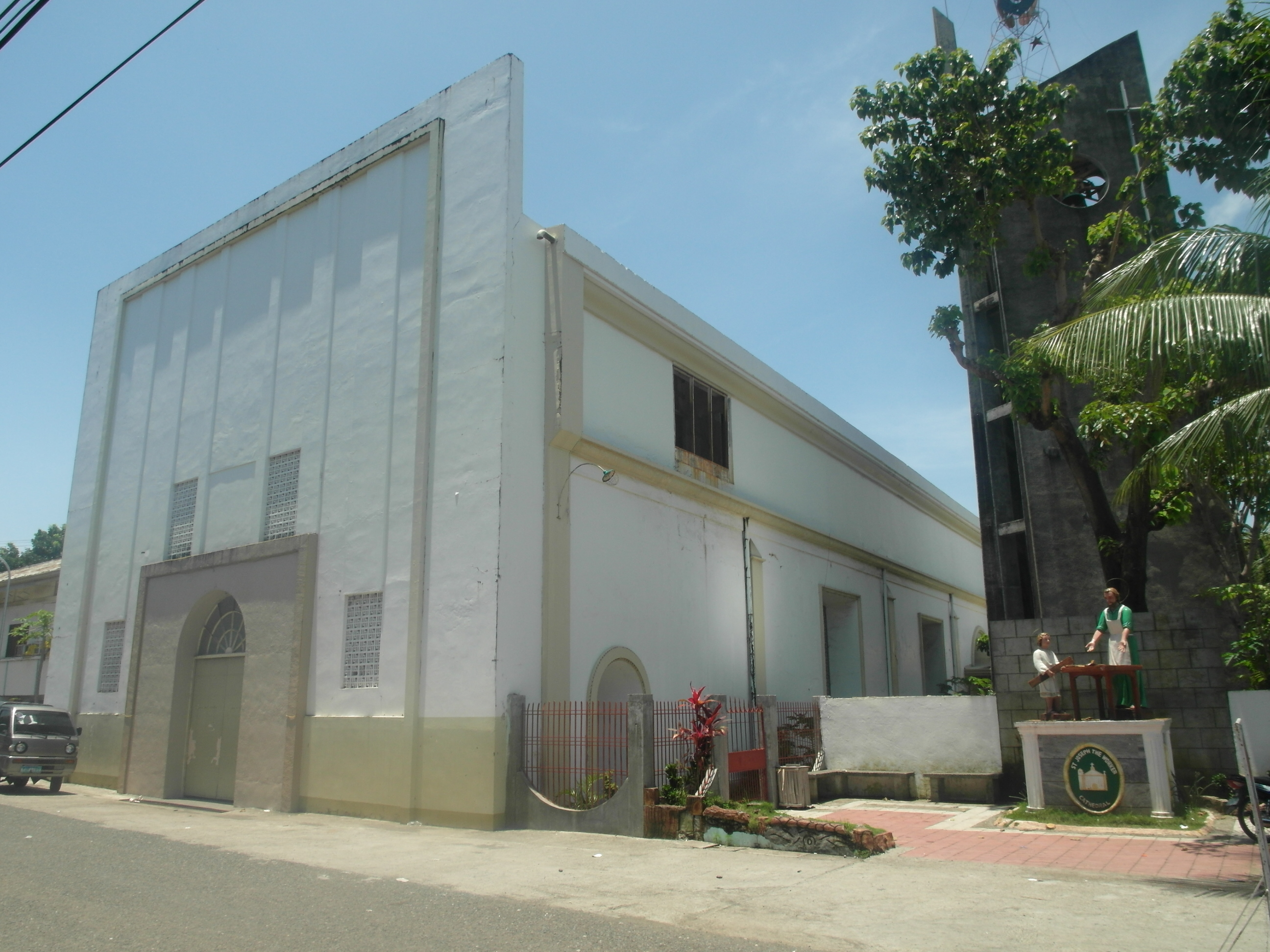
- Saint Joseph the Worker Cathedral

- Coat of arms

Location
- Country: Philippines
- Territory: Antique
- Ecclesiastical province: Jaro
- Metropolitan: Jaro
- Coordinates: 10°44′36″N 121°56′32″E

Statistics
- Area: 2,552 km^{2} (985 sq mi)
- Population: Total; Catholics: (as of 2021); 696,200; 493,600 (70.9%)
- Parishes: 25

Information
- Denomination: Catholic
- Sui iuris church: Latin Church
- Rite: Roman Rite
- Established: June 18, 1962
- Cathedral: Saint Joseph Cathedral in San Jose de Buenavista, Antique
- Patron saint: Saint Joseph
- Secular priests: 53

Current leadership
- Pope: Leo XIV
- Bishop: Marvyn A. Maceda
- Metropolitan Archbishop: Midyphil Billones
- Vicar General: Jose Glicerio Geremia
- Judicial Vicar: Edione Febrero

The Diocese of San Jose de Antique (Lat: Dioecesis Sancti Iosephi de Antiquonia) is a diocese of the Roman Rite of the Latin Church of the Catholic Church whose cathedral is in the municipality of San Jose de Buenavista, Antique in the Philippines. It oversees the entire province of Antique.

== History ==
On June 18, 1962, Pope John XXIII erected the Territorial Prelature of San Jose de Antique with the Apostolic Constitution "Novae cuiusque Ecclesiae constitutio". The new territorial prelature was separated from the Archdiocese of Jaro comprising the whole province of Antique and became a suffragan to the Archdiocese of Jaro.

On November 15, 1982, Pope John Paul II elevated San Jose de Antique and other territorial prelatures to the rank of diocese while remaining a suffragan to Jaro.

On January 7, 2019, after a year Pope Francis appointed Msgr. Marvyn Maceda, vicar general of the Roman Catholic Diocese of Naval in Biliran, as the 5th bishop of San Jose de Antique.

== Ordinaries ==
No	Name	In office	Coat of arms
1.	Cornelius de Wit, M.H.M. †	April 12, 1962 (appointed) – August 9, 1982 (resigned)	
2.	Raul José Quimpo Martirez	January 5, 1983 (appointed) – March 16, 2002 (resigned)	
3.	Romulo Tolentino de la Cruz	March 16, 2002 (succeeded) – May 14, 2008 (appointed Bishop of Kidapawan)	
4.	Jose Romeo Orquejo Lazo	July 21, 2009 – February 14, 2018 (appointed Archbishop of Jaro)	
5.	Marvyn Maceda	January 9, 2019 – present	
