= Jose Romeo Lazo =

21st-century Catholic Archbishop of Jaro

The Most Reverend Jose Romeo Lazo D.D.
- Archbishop Emeritus of Jaro
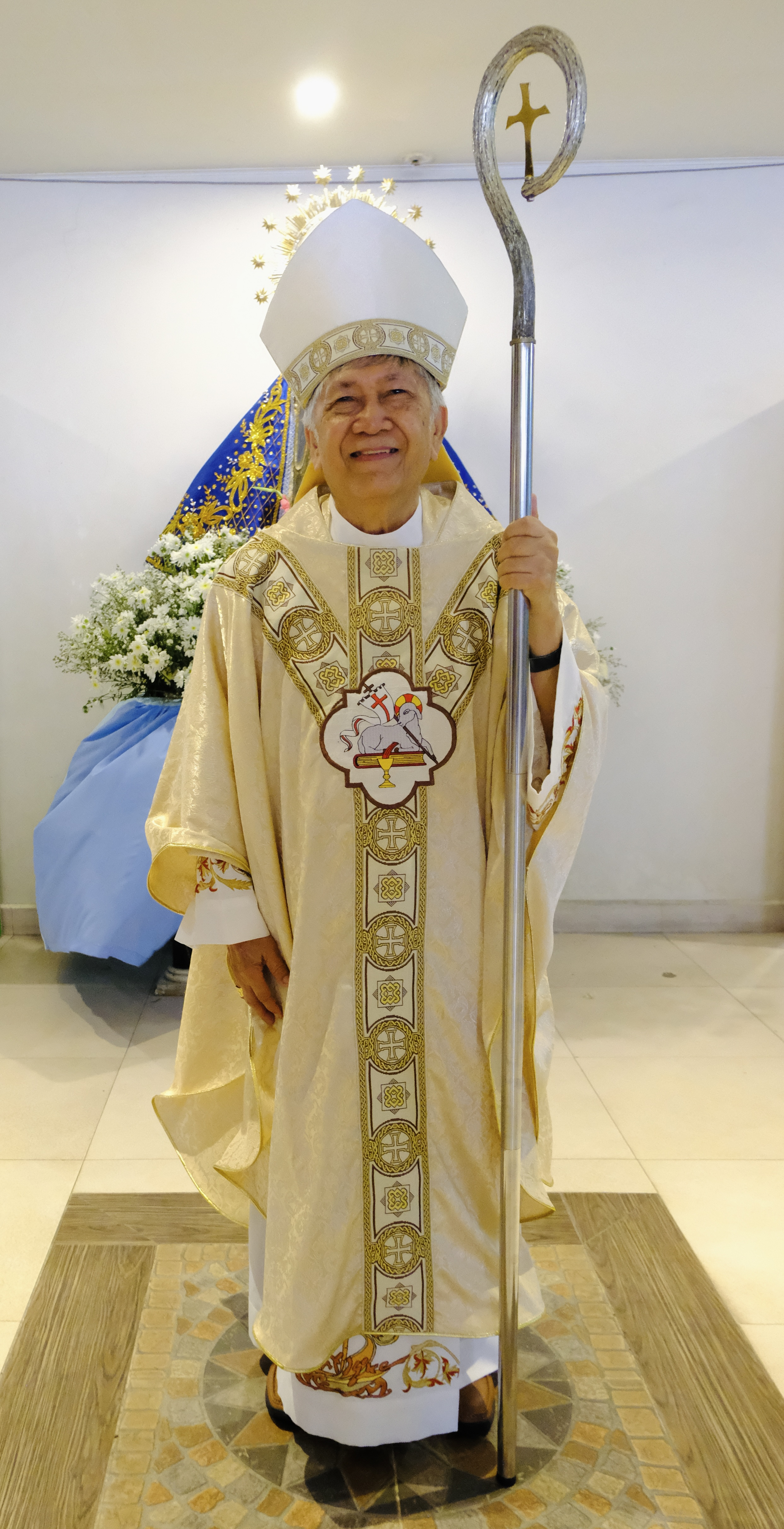
- Province: Jaro
- See: Jaro
- Appointed: February 14, 2018
- Installed: April 17, 2018
- Retired: February 2, 2025
- Predecessor: Angel Lagdameo
- Successor: Midyphil Billones
- Previous posts: Bishop of Kalibo (2004–2009); Bishop of San Jose de Antique (2009–2018)

Orders
- Ordination: April 1, 1975 by Henricus Cornelius de Wit, M.H.M.
- Consecration: December 29, 2003 by Antonio Franco

Personal details
- Born: Jose Romeo Juanito Orquejo Lazo; January 23, 1949 (age 77) San Jose de Buenavista, Antique, Philippines
- Education: St. Peter's Seminary; St. Francis Xavier Seminary; St. Vincent Ferrer Seminary
- Motto: ‘Vobiscum Ambulare’ ('To walk with you')
- Coat of arms: Jose Romeo Lazo's coat of arms

Ordination history
History
Priestly ordination
- Ordained by: Henricus Cornelius de Wit, M.H.M.
Episcopal consecration
- Principal consecrator: Antonio Franco
- Co-consecrators: Angel Lagdameo; Romulo T. de la Cruz
Episcopal succession
Bishops consecrated by Jose Romeo Lazo as principal consecrator
- Midyphil Billones: August 27, 2019
- Styles
- Reference style: His Excellency; The Most Reverend
- Spoken style: Your Excellency
- Religious style: Archbishop

Jose Romeo Juanito Orquejo Lazo is a Filipino Catholic prelate. He is the Archbishop Emeritus of Jaro; he served as its sixth archbishop from 2018 until his resignation in 2025. and the sixth to have the title of archbishop.

== Early life ==
Lazo was born on January 23, 1949, in San Jose de Buenavista, Antique.

== Formation and ordination ==
Lazo began his training for the priesthood at St. Peter's Seminary in San Jose, Antique, studying Philosophy from 1966 to 1970. In 1970, he transferred to St. Francis Xavier Seminary in Davao City, where he finished his philosophical training in 1971. He continued to take theological formation in the same seminary until 1973. The following year, he transferred to St. Vincent Ferrer Seminary in Jaro, Iloilo City, where he finished his priestly training in 1975. He received the Sacrament of Holy Orders, on April 1, 1975, being incardinated in the Prelature (later Diocese) of San Jose, Antique.

== Priesthood ==
Lazo began his ministry in 1975 in Dao, where he later became the parish priest until 1978. From 1978 to 1981, he taught at St. Peter's Seminary in Antique. He was given charge as parish priest of St. Peter's Parish from 1981 to 1983, while also being in charge of the Catechetical Institute of the Prelature of Antique.

Lazo was appointed rector of St. Peter's Seminary from 1983 to 1985, parish priest of Bugasong from 1985 to 1986, President of St. Anthony's College from 1986 to 1989, and Vicar General of the Diocese of Antique from 1987 to 1996. From 1996 to 1997, he spent a year of sabbatical leave doing post-graduate studies in pastoral theology in Berkeley, California, United States. Upon returning to Antique in 1997, he was nominated parish priest of Pandan. Also in 1997, Lazo was assigned as a member of the pastoral team of the Assist Program of the Catholic Bishops' Conference of the Philippines (CBCP) and was given an added assignment as spiritual director of the diocesan Seminary in October 2003.

== As bishop ==
Lazo was appointed Bishop of Kalibo by Pope John Paul II on November 13, 2003, and assumed office after he was ordained bishop by Antonio Franco Apostolic Nuncio to the Philippines, together with the co-ordaining bishops, Angel N. Lagdameo and Romulo de la Cruz on December 29, 2003. He took possession of the see of Kalibo on January 8, 2004.

On July 21, 2009, Lazo was appointed the fourth bishop of Antique by Pope Benedict XVI. He was installed on September 1, 2009.

In the CBCP Lazo worked as vice chairman of the Commission on the Clergy (of which he remains a member) and a member of the Commission on Seminaries from 2013 to 2015.

On February 14, 2018, Ash Wednesday, Pope Francis appointed Lazo as the sixth Archbishop of Jaro, succeeding Angel Lagdameo. He took possession of the see on April 17, 2018. Archbishop Gabriele Giordano Caccia, the Apostolic Nuncio to the Philippines, invested the pallium on Lazo on November 17, 2018.

On February 2, 2025, Pope Francis accepted his resignation and appointed Midyphil Billones, Auxiliary Bishop of Cebu, as his successor. Lazo officially stepped down on April 1, 2025 — the fiftieth anniversary of his priestly ordination.

Catholic Church titles
Preceded by Gabriel Villaruz Reyes	Bishop of Kalibo; January 8, 2004 – July 21, 2009	Succeeded by Jose Corazon T. Tala-oc
Preceded by Romulo Tolentino de la Cruz	Bishop of San Jose de Antique; September 1, 2009 – February 14, 2018	Succeeded by Marvyn A. Maceda
Preceded by Angel Lagdameo	Archbishop of Jaro; April 17, 2018 – February 2, 2025	Succeeded by Midyphil Billones
