= San Jose de Buenavista =

Capital of Antique, Philippines

San Jose de Buenavista San Jose (by locals)
- Municipality
- Municipality of San Jose de Buenavista
- Old Antique Provincial Capitol San Jose de Buenavista Town Proper Evelio B. Javier Freedom Park San Jose de Buenavista Municipal Hall

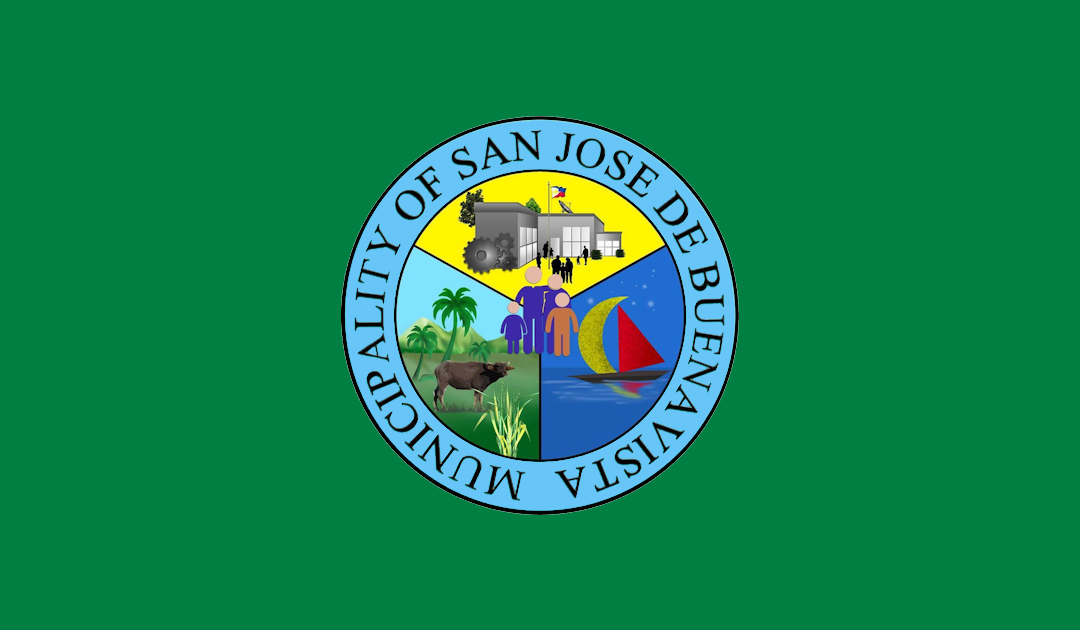
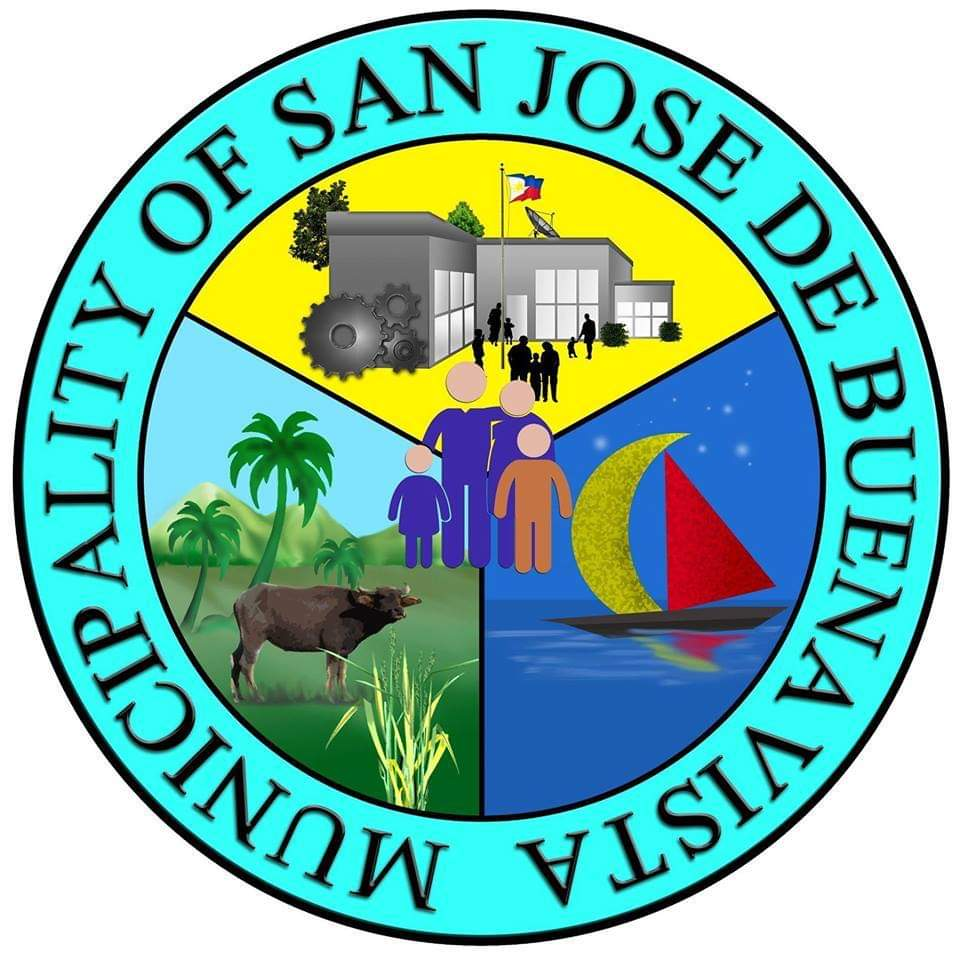
- Flag Seal

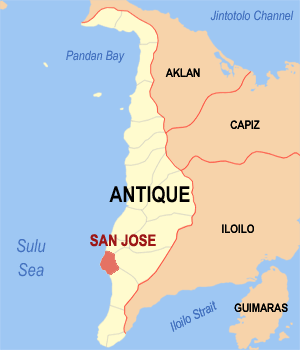
- Map of Antique with San Jose de Buenavista highlighted
- Interactive map of San Jose de Buenavista
- Location within the Philippines
- Coordinates: 10°44′36″N 121°56′28″E
- Country: Philippines
- Region: Western Visayas
- Province: Antique
- District: Lone district
- Founded: 1733
- Barangays: 28 (see Barangays)

Government
  - Type: Sangguniang Bayan
  - Mayor: Atty. Paul Joseph N. Untaran
  - Vice Mayor: Cris John P. Banusing II
  - Representative: Antonio Agapito B. Legarda Jr.
  - Municipal Council: Members: Dr. Lesley Jane C. Lotilla; Aimee Jo P. Tidon; Erech M. Alocilja; April Dagny B. Literatus; Joey L. Molina; Jo Ruel C. Galindo; Ronald V. Gayatin; Ferdinand L. Viesca
  - Electorate: 38,767 voters (2025)

Area
  - Total: 48.56 km^{2} (18.75 sq mi)
- Elevation: 36 m (118 ft)
- Highest elevation: 587 m (1,926 ft)
- Lowest elevation: 0 m (0 ft)

Population (2024 census)
  - Total: 69,522
  - Density: 1,432/km^{2} (3,708/sq mi)
  - Households: 14,750

Economy
  - Income class: 1st municipal income class
  - Poverty incidence: 7.08% (2023)
  - Revenue: ₱ 353.9 million (2024)
  - Assets: ₱ 909.8 million (2024)
  - Expenditure: ₱ 328.4 million (2024)
  - Liabilities: ₱ 328.5 million (2024)

Service provider
  - Electricity: Antique Electric Cooperative (ANTECO)
- Time zone: UTC+8 (PST)
- ZIP code: 5700
- PSGC: 0600613000
- IDD : area code: +63 (0)36
- Native languages: Karay-a; Hiligaynon; Ati; Tagalog
- Website: sanjoseantique.gov.ph

San Jose de Buenavista, officially the Municipality of San Jose de Buenavista (Kinaray-a: Banwa kang San Jose de Buenavista; Hiligaynon: Banwa sang San Jose de Buenavista; Filipino: Bayan ng San Jose de Buenavista), is a municipality and capital of the province of Antique, Philippines. According to the 2024 census, it has a population of 69,522 people. It is often called simply San Jose.

The municipality hosted the 60th Palarong Pambansa in 2017.

== History ==
The Spaniards arrived in Antique in 1581. With them came Augustinian friars who Christianized the inhabitants. Its original name was Tubigon, being still a part of the municipality of Hamtic.

In 1733, it was renamed San José and in 1790 it acquired its municipality through land grants issued by Philippine Governor General Félix Berenguer de Marquina. Later, it became a parish with its first parish priest, Father Manuel Ibáñez.

Some two hundred years ago, the site now occupied by San José de Buenavista was a dense jungle and a favorite landing place for pirates to raid the area.

In 1802, by popular demand, San José de Buenavista became the capital of the province of Antique and Agustín Sumandi was appointed as its first Gobernadorcillo, a sort of local governor during the Spanish Colonial Era.

On November 24, 1898, San Jose de Buenavista was captured by Philippine Revolutionary Expeditionary Forces led by Gen. Leandro Fullon from Cavite during the Battle of Antique after a 2-day struggle. The rest of the Antique province under Spanish authority surrendered to the revolutionary forces.

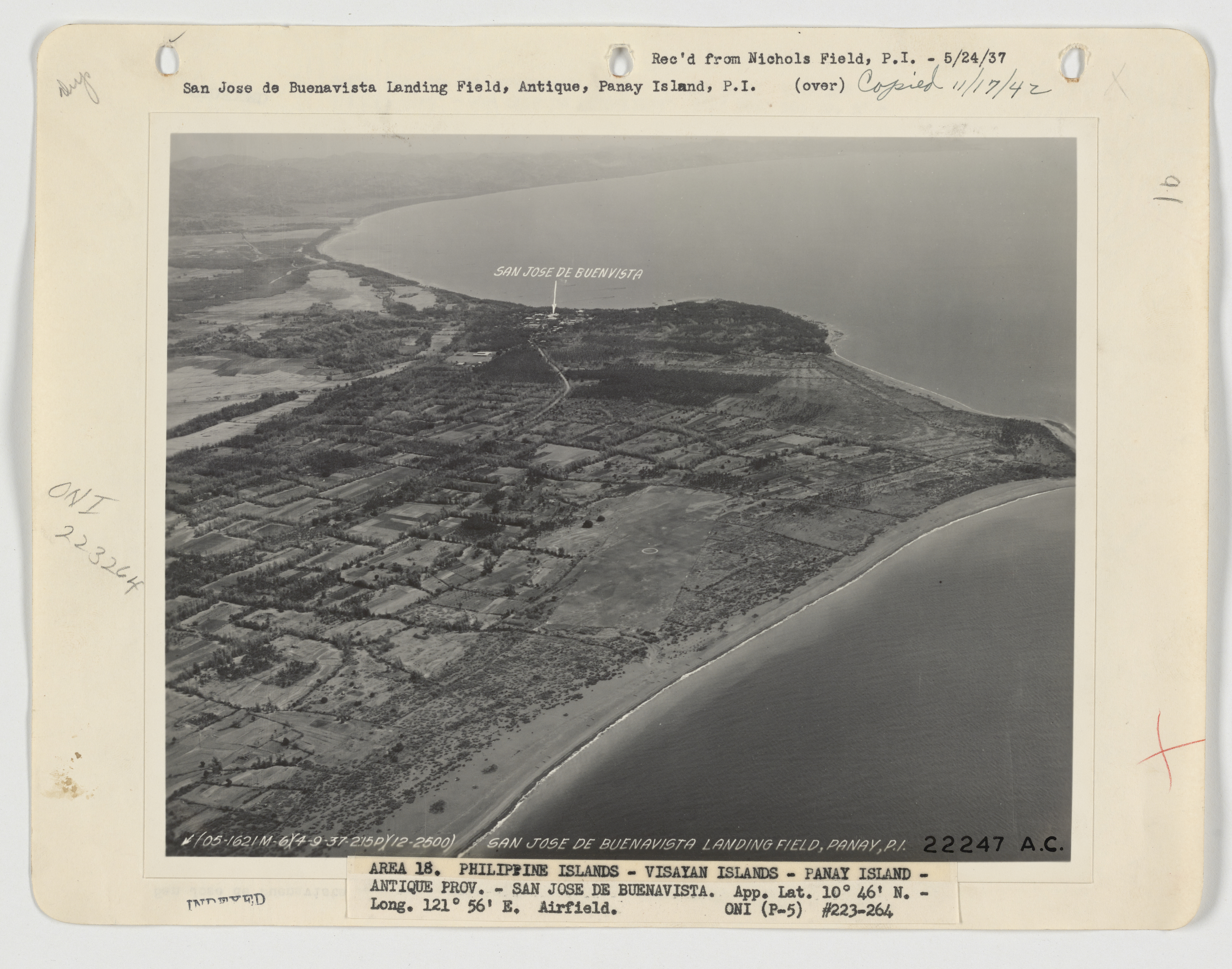
Aerial view of San Jose de Buenavista, 1937

In 1954, by the virtue of Executive Order No. 3 of the President of the Philippines, the southern portion of San Jose de Buenavista was formed into an independent municipality under the name of Hamtic. The boundary was described to be "From a point on the south bank of the mouth of Malandog River running northeasterly in a straight imaginary line to a point on the northeast side of the San Jose-Hamtic provincial road ten meters west of the intersection of this northeast side of said road with the northwest side of the Sibalom-Piapi-Malandog provincial road; thence following approximately the same direction in an imaginary line that is parallel to, and ten meters distant from the said Sibalom-Piapi-Malandog provincial road until it touches the present boundary between San Jose and Sibalom."

The Evelio B. Javier Airport, the only airport serving commercial flights in the province of Antique, is located in San Jose.

== Geography ==
San Jose de Buenavista is 97 kilometres (60 mi) from Iloilo City, 182 kilometres (113 mi) from Kalibo, and 213 kilometres (132 mi) from Roxas City.

According to the Philippine Statistics Authority, the municipality has a land area of 48.56 square kilometres (18.75 sq mi) constituting 1.78% of the 2,729.17-square-kilometre- (1,053.74 sq mi) total area of Antique.

=== Barangays ===
San Jose de Buenavista is politically subdivided into 28 barangays. Each barangay consists of puroks and some have sitios.

PSGC	Barangay	Population			±% p.a.	
		2024		2010		
060613001	Atabay	3.3%	2,266	2,164	▴	0.32%
060613002	Badiang	4.3%	2,995	2,638	▴	0.88%
060613003	Barangay 1 (Poblacion)	4.0%	2,808	2,762	▴	0.11%
060613004	Barangay 2 (Poblacion)	2.6%	1,804	1,867	▾	−0.24%
060613005	Barangay 3 (Poblacion)	4.9%	3,384	3,289	▴	0.20%
060613006	Barangay 4 (Poblacion)	4.2%	2,943	2,847	▴	0.23%
060613007	Barangay 5 (Poblacion)	1.4%	969	1,048	▾	−0.54%
060613008	Barangay 6 (Poblacion)	0.7%	489	482	▴	0.10%
060613009	Barangay 7 (Poblacion)	0.6%	395	398	▾	−0.05%
060613010	Barangay 8 (Poblacion)	6.7%	4,689	4,671	▴	0.03%
060613011	Bariri	1.7%	1,209	1,130	▴	0.47%
060613014	Bugarot (Catungan-Bugarot)	1.4%	946	952	▾	−0.04%
060613015	Cansadan (Cansadan-Tubudan)	2.8%	1,978	1,380	▴	2.51%
060613016	Durog	0.7%	496	280	▴	4.02%
060613017	Funda-Dalipe	8.5%	5,879	5,498	▴	0.46%
060613018	Igbonglo	2.0%	1,401	1,302	▴	0.51%
060613019	Inabasan	2.0%	1,382	1,357	▴	0.13%
060613020	Madrangca	3.8%	2,630	2,252	▴	1.07%
060613021	Magcalon	1.6%	1,132	1,074	▴	0.36%
060613022	Malaiba	2.5%	1,712	1,624	▴	0.36%
060613023	Maybato Norte	6.1%	4,219	3,716	▴	0.88%
060613024	Maybato Sur	3.1%	2,185	1,655	▴	1.93%
060613025	Mojon	2.2%	1,517	1,438	▴	0.37%
060613026	Pantao	1.1%	756	752	▴	0.04%
060613027	San Angel	3.5%	2,468	2,310	▴	0.46%
060613028	San Fernando	3.9%	2,708	2,283	▴	1.18%
060613029	San Pedro	8.2%	5,735	5,300	▴	0.55%
060613030	Supa	2.1%	1,439	1,378	▴	0.30%
	Total		69,522	57,847	▴	1.27%

=== Climate ===
Climate data for San Jose de Buenavista, Antique
Month	Jan	Feb	Mar	Apr	May	Jun	Jul	Aug	Sep	Oct	Nov	Dec	Year
Mean daily maximum °C (°F)	30 (86)	31 (88)	32 (90)	33 (91)	32 (90)	30 (86)	29 (84)	29 (84)	29 (84)	29 (84)	30 (86)	30 (86)	30 (87)
Mean daily minimum °C (°F)	21 (70)	21 (70)	22 (72)	23 (73)	25 (77)	25 (77)	25 (77)	25 (77)	24 (75)	24 (75)	23 (73)	22 (72)	23 (74)
Average precipitation mm (inches)	19 (0.7)	17 (0.7)	26 (1.0)	37 (1.5)	119 (4.7)	191 (7.5)	258 (10.2)	260 (10.2)	248 (9.8)	196 (7.7)	97 (3.8)	39 (1.5)	1,507 (59.3)
Average rainy days	7.2	5.2	8.3	11.9	22.3	26.5	28.3	28.2	27.3	26.4	18.7	11.8	222.1
Source: Meteoblue (modeled/calculated data, not measured locally)

== Demographics ==
Population census of San Jose de Buenavista
Year	Pop.	±% p.a.
1903	19,819	—
1918	21,221	+0.46%
1939	29,140	+1.52%
1948	34,639	+1.94%
1960	17,124	−5.70%
1970	23,384	+3.16%
1975	24,730	+1.13%
1980	30,266	+4.12%
1990	40,267	+2.90%
1995	42,927	+1.21%
2000	48,261	+2.54%
2007	54,871	+1.79%
2010	57,847	+1.94%
2015	62,534	+1.49%
2020	65,140	+0.86%
2024	69,522	+1.58%
Source: Philippine Statistics Authority

In the 2024 census, San Jose de Buenavista had a population of 69,522 people. The population density was 1,400 inhabitants per square kilometre (3,600/sq mi).

=== Language ===
Kinaray-a is the spoken language of the municipality. Kinaray-a came from the word "iraya", which refers to a group of people residing in the mountain areas of the province. Hiligaynon is spoken as a second language of the municipality.

=== Religion ===
Cathedral of San Jose de Antique

San Jose is the Episcopal see of the Roman Catholic Diocese of San Jose de Antique.

== Economy ==
Poverty incidence of San Jose de Buenavista (%)

Source: Philippine Statistics Authority

== Government ==
Year	Mayor	Notes
Before the creation of San Jose de Buenavista into what it is today, it had three neighboring pueblos, Guintas, Antike and San Pedro. These pueblos, each under the Presidente Municipal, served for one year as follows:
1901–1902	Ceriaco Erena	San Jose de Buenavista
1901–1902	Ramon Javier	Antike
1901–1902	Nemesio Tinga	Guintas
1901–1902	Emigdio Moscoso	San Pedro
1902–1903	Anselmo Alicante	San Jose de Buenavista
1902–1903	Feliciano Mijillano	Antike
1902–1903	Apolonio Magbanua	Guintas
1902–1903	Agapito Capistrano	San Pedro
When the pueblos were organized into one pueblo, San Jose de Buenavista, the following served as Presidente Municipal:
1904–1905	Martin Iglesias	
1905–1908	Mariano Autajay	
1908–1910	Jacinto Peña	
1910–1912	Sixto Quilino	
1918–1922	Vicente Javier	
1919–1922	Antonio Ricarze	He died in office, January 1922 and Jose Iglesias served the unexpired term for the whole year.
1922–1928	Gregorio Esclavilla	
1928–1934	Alberto Villavert	
1934–1937	Antonio delos Reyes	
1938–1951	Silverio Nietes	
1952–1954	Julian Pacificador	
In 1954, the title, Presidente Municipal, was changed to Municipal Mayor. When Hamtic was separated from San Jose de Buenavista in 1954, Municipal Mayor Julian Pacificador was transferred to Hamtic and Vice Mayor Delfin Encarnacion took over as Municipal Mayor of San Jose.
1954-1956	Delfin Encarnacion	
1956–1963	Severa Panaguiton-Banusing	Still the first and only female mayor of San Jose de Buenavista
1964–1967	Agerico Villavert	
1968–May 7, 1986	Oscar Salazar	
May 8, 1986, to December 1987	Efren G. Esclavilla	
1987	Condrado V. Petinglay, Jr.	Officer-in-Charge
1988-1998	Efren G. Esclavilla	
1998-2007	Fernando Corvera	
2007-2016	Rony Lavega Molina	
2016–2024	Elmer C Untaran	

== Tourism ==
Since 1971, San Jose de Buenavista celebrates the Binirayan Festival during the final week of December. This festival involves a theatrical presentation commemorating founding of the first Malayan settlement or barangay in the country. San Jose celebrates its religious fiesta on May 1 to honor its patron saint, Saint Joseph the Worker.

Evelio Javier Freedom Park is located in front of the Antique Provincial Capitol building in San Jose de Buenavista. It is named for the late Governor Evelio Javier, who was shot by an unknown assassin on February 11, 1986. A marker in the park denotes the exact place of his death.

Old and new buildings dot the town: the Old Capitol Building; Evelio B. Javier Memorabilia (New Capitol); Azurin Mansion; La Granja and Binirayan Hills; and the San Pedro Old Church.

== Education ==
Antique National School

The San Jose Schools District Office governs all educational institutions within the municipality. It oversees the management and operations of all private and public, from primary to secondary schools.

=== Primary and elementary schools ===
- Antique Adventist Academy
- Antique Child Growth Center
- Antique Christian Center
- Assemblyman Segundo Moscoso Memorial School
- Atabay Elementary School
- Bagumbayan Elementary School
- Banusing-Serdeña Elementary School
- Bariri Elementary School
- Bright Eyes Montessori School
- Canuto B. Pefianco Sr. Elementary School (Madrangca Elementary School)
- Cornerstone Kindergarten
- Delegate Angel Salazar Jr. Memorial School
- Doane Causeway Baptist Church Learning Center
- Durog Elementary School
- El Shekinah International Christian School
- Eufrosino Q. Moscoso Elementary School
- Evelio B. Javier Memorial School
- Good News Christian School
- Gov. Santos Capadocia MS
- Igbonglo Elementary School
- Inabasan Elementary School
- Joy Hope Learning Center
- Little Lamp Learning Center
- Lugutan Elementary School
- Loreto-Joaquin Delgado Elementary School (Badiang Elementary School)
- Maybato Elementary School
- Nahum Baptist Learning Center
- Pantao-Igbonglo Elementary School
- Rosario J. Moscoso Memorial School
- Salazar ES (Funda Dalipe Elementary School)
- San Angel- Malaiba Elementary School
- San Fernando Elementary School
- SB Benjamin Dagohoy Memorial School
- St. Joseph Learning Center
- Tubudan Cansadan Elementary School

=== Secondary schools ===
- Advance Central College
- Antique Integrated School
- Antique National School
- San Pedro National High School
- St. Anthony's College
- Wright Technological College

== Notable personalities ==
- Jerry Navarro Elizalde (1924–1999), Artist for Visual Arts, later proclaimed a National Artist
- John Iremil Teodoro (b. 1973), Writer, university professor, freelance journalist
- Alex C. Delos Santos (b. 1967), Karay-a writer and theater artist
- Richard Yee (b. 1977), Former basketball player
- Alberto A. Villavert (1903–1984), Politician who served as Governor of Antique
- Marian Capadocia (b. 1995), Tennis player
- Jose Romeo Lazo (b. 1948), Catholic priest, Archbishop of Jaro
