= Battle of San Jose de Buenavista =

Antique Revolution of 1898
- Part of the Philippine Revolution
Date	September 21, 1898 – November 23, 1898
Location	Antique, Panay Island, Philippines
Result	Filipino victory: Surrender of Spanish troops; establishment of Federal State of the Visayas

Belligerents
Katipunan	(Spain) Spanish Empire: Guardia Civil

Commanders and leaders
Gen. Leandro Fullon; Pedro Ledesma; Silvestre Salvio; Lt. Ruperto Abellon	(Spain) Castro Verde (surrendered)

Casualties and losses
Unknown	Unknown

The Battle of Antique (Filipino: Labanan sa Antique, Hiligaynon: Gubat sang Antique, Spanish: Batalla de Antique) was fought in Antique province, between the forces of Spanish colonial government and the Antiqueño Katipuneros led by the Visayan General Leandro Fullon. The Katipuneros decisively won the battle.
