= Marvyn Maceda =

Filipino Catholic bishop (born 1969)

Most Reverend Marvyn A. Maceda D.D.
- Bishop of San Jose de Antique
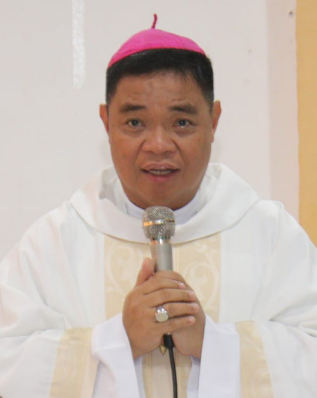
- Maceda in 2023
- Province: Jaro
- See: San Jose de Antique
- Appointed: January 7, 2019
- Installed: April 9, 2019
- Predecessor: Jose Romeo Lazo

Orders
- Ordination: May 29, 1996
- Consecration: April 2, 2019 by John F. Du

Personal details
- Born: Marvyn Abrea Maceda; February 11, 1969 (age 57) Biliran, Philippines
- Denomination: Roman Catholic
- Motto: "Servus Jesu Christi" (Servant of Jesus Christ)
- Coat of arms

Styles of Marvyn A. Maceda
- Reference style: His Excellency; The Most Reverend
- Spoken style: Your Excellency
- Religious style: Bishop

Marvyn Abrea Maceda (born February 11, 1969) is a Filipino bishop of the Catholic Church who has been serving as the Bishop of San Jose de Antique since 2019.

== Early life and education ==
Maceda was born in Biliran, in the Diocese of Naval, on February 11, 1969. He completed his philosophical studies at the Sacred Heart Seminary in Palo, Leyte, and pursued theology at the San Jose Seminary in Loyola Heights, Quezon City.

== Priesthood ==
He was ordained a priest on May 29, 1996, for the Diocese of Naval. After his ordination, he served as parish priest of Our Lady of Mount Carmel Mission while also acting as diocesan director for youth from 1996 to 2000. He held the position of diocesan bursar from 1996 until 2007 and concurrently served as chancellor of the diocese from 1996 until 2010.

Beginning in 2000, he was assigned to the Saint Roche Mission Chapel, and later to the Our Lady of the Immaculate Conception Mission Chapel in Naval, Biliran. During this period, he played a significant role in strengthening the diocesan Basic Ecclesial Communities (BEC) program and was appointed diocesan BEC director in 2006, a post he held until 2010.

In 2010, he took a year-long sabbatical at the Our Lady of the Philippines Trappist Monastery in Jordan, Guimaras. Upon his return in 2011, he resumed pastoral leadership as parish priest of Our Lady of the Immaculate Conception in Leyte. He also served as pastoral director of the BEC, a member of the presbyteral council and the council of consultors, and was named vicar general of the Diocese of Naval. He held these responsibilities until 2017. In 2018, he was appointed director of the diocesan Commission for the Clergy.

== Episcopal ministry ==
On January 7, 2019, Pope Francis appointed Maceda as Bishop of San Jose de Antique. His episcopal ordination took place on April 2, 2019, at the Our Lady of the Most Holy Rosary Cathedral in Naval, Biliran. The principal consecrator was Archbishop John F. Du of Palo, assisted by Naval Bishop Rex Cullingham Ramirez and Bishop Emeritus Filomeno Bactol. He was formally installed as the fifth bishop of the Diocese of San Jose de Antique on April 9, 2019, during a liturgical celebration led by his predecessor, Archbishop Jose Romeo Lazo of Jaro.

== See also ==
- Roman Catholic Diocese of San Jose de Antique

Preceded by Jose Romeo Lazo	Bishop of San Jose de Antique; 2019–present	Incumbent
