= Midyphil Billones =

Filipino Catholic prelate (born 1969)

His Excellency, The Most Reverend Midyphil Bermejo Billones D.D., STD
- Metropolitan Archbishop of Jaro; Apostolic Administrator of Kabankalan
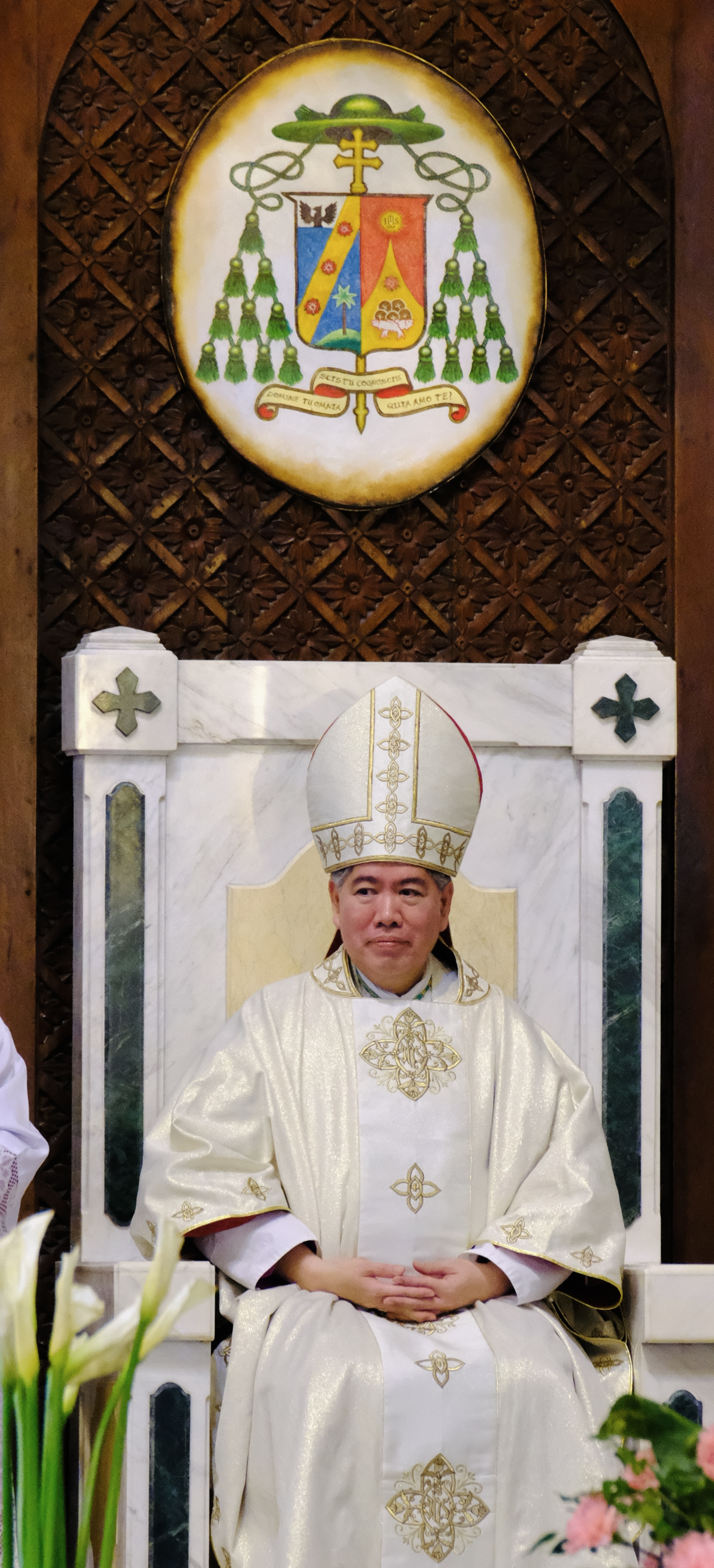
- Church: Catholic Church
- Province: Jaro
- See: Jaro
- Appointed: February 2, 2025
- Installed: April 2, 2025
- Predecessor: Jose Romeo Lazo
- Other post: Apostolic Administrator of Kabankalan (2026–present)
- Previous posts: Rector, St. Joseph Regional Seminary (2013-2019); Priest, Archdiocese of Jaro (1995–2019); Auxiliary Bishop of Cebu (2019–2025)

Orders
- Ordination: October 2, 1995 by Alberto Jover Piamonte
- Consecration: August 27, 2019 by Jose Romeo Lazo

Personal details
- Born: Midyphil Bermejo Billones; July 4, 1969 (age 57) Panay, Capiz, Philippines
- Education: St. Vincent Ferrer Seminary; Loyola School of Theology; Pontifical Gregorian University
- Motto: Domine tu omnia scis tu cognoscis quia amo te! (Latin for 'Lord, you know everything, You know that I love you!') (Note: From John 21:15)
- Coat of arms: Midyphil Bermejo Billones's coat of arms

Ordination history
History
Priestly ordination
- Ordained by: Alberto Jover Piamonte
Episcopal consecration
- Principal consecrator: Jose Romeo Lazo
- Co-consecrators: Jose S. Palma; Angel Lagdameo

Styles of Midyphil B. Billones
- Reference style: His Excellency; The Most Reverend
- Spoken style: Your Excellency
- Religious style: Archbishop

Midyphil "Dodong" Bermejo Billones (born July 4, 1969) is a Filipino prelate of the Catholic Church. He is the current Metropolitan Archbishop of Jaro, having been appointed by Pope Francis in 2025.

== Early life and education ==
Midyphil Bermejo Billones was born on July 4, 1969, in Panay, Capiz, Philippines.

He studied philosophy at St. Vincent Ferrer Seminary in Iloilo City, then obtained a master's degree in theology at Loyola School of Theology in Quezon City. In 2011, during his tenure as priest of the Archdiocese of Jaro, he obtained his Doctorate in Theology at the Pontifical Gregorian University in Rome, Italy.

== Ministry ==
=== Priesthood ===
Billones was ordained to the priesthood on October 2, 1995. He then served as parochial vicar of Jaro Cathedral until 1997. He also served as the personal secretaries of former archbishops Alberto Jover Piamonte and Angel Lagdameo from 1997 to 2001.

Within the Archdiocese of Jaro, he was a member of its presbyteral council from 2000 to 2001, as well as the archdiocese's chancellor until 2004. He was also the rector of St. Joseph Regional Seminary in Iloilo City from 2013 to 2019.

=== Auxiliary Bishop of Cebu ===
On July 16, 2019, Pope Francis named Billones auxiliary bishop of the Archdiocese of Cebu and titular bishop of Tagarata. His appointment made him an assistant of Archbishop José S. Palma. He was ordained to the episcopate at Jaro Cathedral on August 27, and was welcomed in a reception Mass at the Cebu Metropolitan Cathedral on September 26.

Within the Archdiocese of Cebu, he became a member of the archdiocese's Council of Consultors in 2019. He was also the moderator of the National Shrine of St. Joseph in Mandaue, Cebu.

On November 21, 2019, in one of his homilies, Billones admitted and "confessed" to almost losing his faith but eventually rediscovering it. He admitted that when his mother died in 2013, he stopped praying the Rosary because "Mary left my mom". He further said that he was "doubting" on his priestly vocation due to grief and depression. However, while trapped in the middle of Metro Manila's heavy traffic jams, he rediscovered his faith when he saw a poster of the Blessed Virgin Mary, which led him to become emotional. He then said in his homily that he experienced the "grace of healing", which further motivated him to start praying again.

Within the Catholic Bishops' Conference of the Philippines (CBCP), he is a member of the conference's Commission on Doctrine of the Faith, and Commission on Seminaries.

==== Coat of arms ====
Coat of arms as Auxiliary Bishop

=== Metropolitan Archbishop of Jaro ===
On February 2, 2025, Pope Francis appointed Billones as the fourteenth Metropolitan Archbishop of Jaro. He succeeded Jose Romeo Lazo, who resigned a year after reaching the mandatory retirement age of 75. His appointment coincided with Candlemas. He was installed exactly two months later in the presence of Lazo, Archbishop José S. Palma of Cebu, Cardinal Jose Advincula of Manila, and Archbishop Charles John Brown, Apostolic Nuncio to the Philippines. He received the pallium from Pope Leo XIV on June 29 in Rome, coinciding with the Solemnity of Saints Peter and Paul.

He was appointed apostolic administrator of the Diocese of Kabankalan on August 11, 2026, after its bishop, Louie Galbines, was installed as Bishop of Bacolod.

== See also ==
- Roman Catholic Archdiocese of Cebu
- Roman Catholic Archdiocese of Jaro
- Historical list of the Catholic bishops of the Philippines

== Notes ==
Catholic Church titles
Preceded by Jose Romeo Lazo	Archbishop of Jaro; April 2, 2025 – present	Incumbent
Preceded by Jan Bagiński	— TITULAR — Bishop of Tagarata; August 27, 2019 – February 2, 2025	Vacant
