= Cyril Villareal =

Filipino Catholic bishop (born 1974)

His Excellency, The Most Reverend Cyril B. Villareal
- Bishop of Kalibo
- Province: Capiz
- See: Kalibo
- Appointed: January 24, 2026
- Installed: April 23, 2026
- Predecessor: Jose Corazon Tala-oc
- Previous posts: Vicar General, Archdiocese of Capiz (2016–2023); Diocesan Administrator, Archdiocese of Capiz (2021–2023)

Orders
- Ordination: May 25, 2001 by Onesimo Cadiz Gordoncillo
- Consecration: April 23, 2026 by Victor Bendico

Personal details
- Born: Cyril Buhayan Villareal; March 1, 1974 (age 52) Mambusao, Capiz, Philippines
- Denomination: Catholic
- Education: Saint Pius X Seminary (BA); University of Santo Tomas (ST.L); University of Vienna (MA)
- Motto: Bendicam (Latin for 'I will bless' – Psalm 34:1)
- Coat of arms: Cyril B. Villareal's coat of arms

Ordination history
History
Priestly ordination
- Ordained by: Onesimo Cadiz Gordoncillo
Episcopal consecration
- Principal consecrator: Victor Bendico
- Co-consecrators: Jose Corazon Tala-oc; Narciso Abellana
- Styles
- Reference style: His Excellency; The Most Reverend
- Spoken style: Your Excellency
- Religious style: Bishop

Cyril "Jojo" Buhayan Villareal (born March 1, 1974) is a Filipino Catholic prelate who is currently the Bishop of the Diocese of Kalibo.

== Early life ==
Villareal was born on March 1, 1974, in Mambusao, Capiz, Philippines, to parents Candido Villareal and Elenita Buhayan. Nicknamed "Jojo", Villareal spent his formation years as a seminarian at the Saint Pius X Seminary in Roxas City, where he obtained his Bachelor of Arts degree in philosophy.

He then continued his theological studies at the Pontifical and Royal University of Santo Tomas, where he earned his bachelor's in sacred theology in 1998, and finishing his graduate studies with a master's degree in higher religious studies, and a licentiate in sacred theology in 2000.

== Ministry ==
=== Priesthood ===
Villareal was ordained a priest on May 25, 2001, at the Immaculate Conception Metropolitan Cathedral in Roxas City, by then Archbishop of Capiz Onesimo Cadiz Gordoncillo.

Villareal's first assignment was as an Assistant Prefect of Discipline & Professor of Moral Theology at the Sancta Maria Mater et Regina Seminarium in Roxas, Capiz, a position which he held from his diaconate in 2000, to 2004. Simultaneously, he also was the Assistant Dean of Theology at the same seminary, serving within the same period, before leaving for Vienna in 2005.

Villareal then became an Assistant Chaplain at the Filipino Catholic Chaplaincy, situated at the Archdiocese of Vienna, from September 2005 to September 2010, primarily serving at the Parish of Our Lady of Mount Carmel as an Aushilfskaplan.

Within the same period, he studied and finished his master's degree in Moral Theology at the University of Vienna, where he defended his thesis on "Current Views on Marriage and Sexuality: An Addendum to the Trinitarian Dimension of Conjugal Love" in 2011, under the academic supervision of Dr. Gunther Prüller-Jagendteufel.

In his return from higher studies, he went on to serve as a formator at the same seminary he spent his formation years at, from 2012 to 2016. He became a rector of the Immaculate Conception Metropolitan Cathedral, the seat of the Archdiocese of Capiz, a position he held from 2016 to 2018, replacing Msgr. Victor B. Bendico, who was appointed the second Bishop of Baguio. He then became Rector of the Colegio de la Purisima Concepcion, from 2018 to 2024.

Villareal served as vicar general of the Archdiocese of Capiz during the tenure of Cardinal Jose Advincula as Archbishop. Following the Cardinal's transfer to the Archdiocese of Manila, Villareal was elected as the diocesan administrator of the archdiocese during the sede vacante period in June 2021; a position he held until the canonical possession of Victor Bendico in May 2023.

He served as the parish priest of Saint Thomas of Villanova Parish, in Dao, Capiz, until his appointment to the episcopate in January 2026.

=== Episcopate ===
Pope Leo XIV appointed Villareal as the fifth Bishop of Kalibo on January 24, 2026, succeeding Jose Corazon Tala-oc, who retired in June 2025. He was installed on April 23.

== Views ==
Villareal disagrees with the traditional Catholic teaching on sexuality, stating in a 2011 Academic work, that:

In the past, there was the problem of the high rate of mortality among babies. Thus, in that context, it may seem logical that the church should declare that, in the light of the natural law, each and every act should be open to procreation. But times have changed. We live in a completely different world, far different from that of Thomas or even those who lived immediately after him. Now, we have a high rate of survival for babies, and women are employed for financial reasons, for self-fulfillment and in the name of women’s emancipation. Such a changed environment surely affects also the number of children that women would have to bear and rear.

== See also ==
- Roman Catholic Diocese of Capiz
- List of Catholic Bishops in the Philippines

Catholic Church titles
Preceded by Jose Corazon Tala-oc	Bishop of Kalibo; April 23, 2026 – present	Incumbent
