= St. Pius X Seminary =

Roman Catholic seminary in Capiz, Philippines

St. Pius X Seminary Seminarium Sancti Pii Decimi
- Motto: Instaurare Omnia in Cristo
- Motto in English: To restore all things in Christ
- Type: Private Seminary Catholic
- Established: 1957
- Founder: Bishop Antonio F. Frondoza
- Affiliations: Pian Alumni Association (SPXS Alumni), Sancta Maria, Mater et Regina, Seminarium, Roman Catholic Archdiocese of Capiz
- Religious affiliation: Roman Catholic
- Rector: Rev. Fr. Dennis Dexter Sontillano
- Location: Pines Hills, Lawaan, Roxas City, Philippines
- Hymn: Hymn to St. Pius X
- Colors: White Yellow
- Nicknames: Pians, Bolanos

The Seminary of St. Pius X (Latin: Seminarium Sancti Pii Decimi), or St. Pius X Seminary (SPXS), is a Roman Catholic secondary school and seminary in the Lawaan Hills, Roxas City, Philippines, run by the Catholic priests of the Archdiocese of Capiz. The seminary and its surrounding areas comprise some three hectares of rocky hills. Cardinal Jaime Sin was the first rector of the school. In 1999, the college (Philosophy and Theology) of St. Pius X Seminary transferred to Cagay, Roxas City, and named the school Sancta Maria, Mater et Regina, Seminarium (SMMRS) to honor the Blessed Virgin Mary. SPXS decided to retain and maintain its high school and pre-college until 2012, pre-college was transferred to SMMRS.

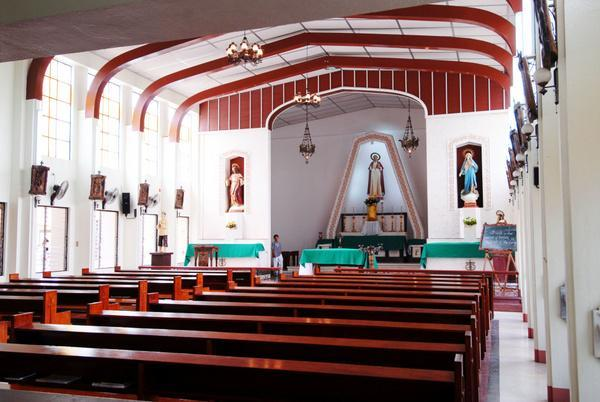
The Chapel

== History ==
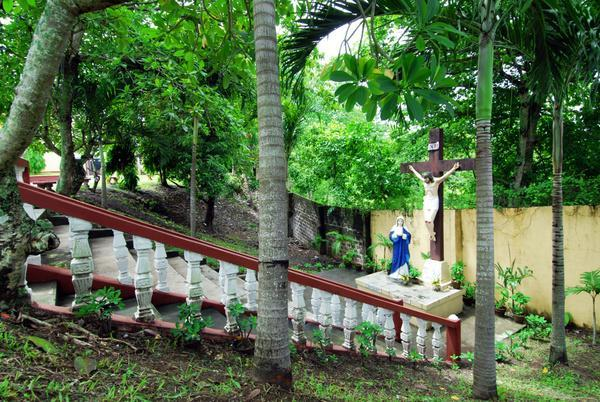

The erection of the Diocese of Capiz on 28 May 1951 brought a need to train priests. But the meager financial resources of the young diocese made the proposed project a difficult one, considering that the bishop had no permanent residence yet. However, the late Bishop Antonio Frondosa, remained undaunted. Donors contributed to the bishop's residence, and for the 3.3 hectare lot for the seminary site. The first cornerstone of the Capiz Diocesan Seminary was laid on 13 August 1953, and the bishop's residence was inaugurated on the same day. On 3 September 1953, feast of St. Pius X, the first half of the seminary was blessed by Auxiliary Bishop Teofilo Camomot and Archbishop Jose Ma. Cuenco. Frondosa issued circular No. 3/57 on 31 May 1957 announcing the opening of the new diocesan seminary and appointing Jaime Sin as its first rector.

Seven priests staffed the school in its first years with five lay teachers, and 33 seminarians. On completion, the seminary was blessed on 13 June 1959. Its curriculum, Classical Secondary Courses, was recognized by the Department of Education on 21 April 1961.

In 1999, the college (Philosophy and Theology) of St. Pius X Seminary transferred to Cagay, Roxas City, Capiz and named the school Sancta Maria, Mater et Regina, Seminarium (SMMRS) to honor the Blessed Virgin Mary. SPXS decided to retain and maintain its high school and pre-college.

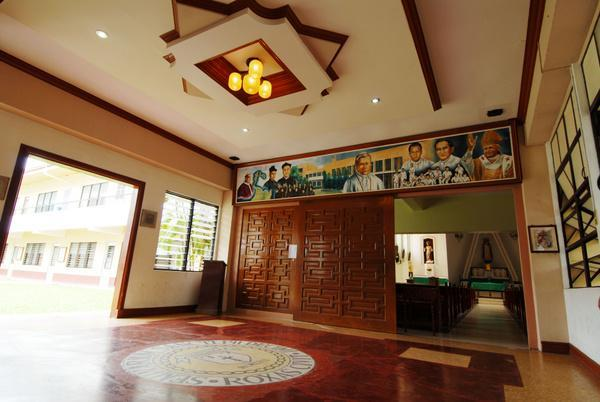
Lobby

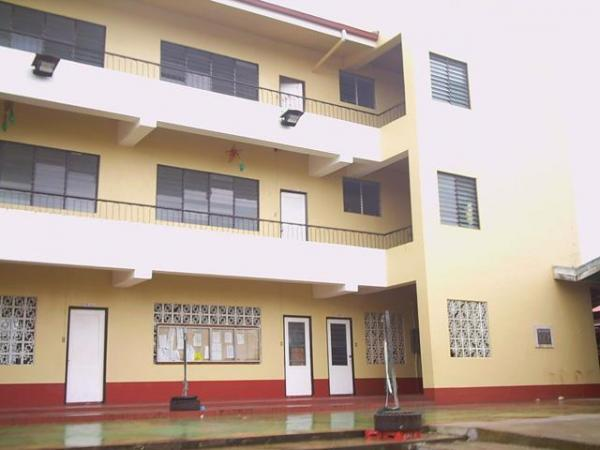
The "New Building"

=== Seminary Rectors ===
Rectors of Saint Pius X Seminary
Name	Year
Rev. Msgr. Jaime Sin	1957-1967
Rev. Fr. Antonio Viray	1967-1968
Rev. Fr. Raul Jose Martirez	1968-1971
Rev. Fr. Vicente Navarra	1971-1979
Rev. Msgr. Daniel Viloria Jr.	1981-1995
Rev. Fr. Jose Advincula Jr.	1995-1999
Rev. Fr. Bernie Barrios (acting)	1999-2000
Rev. Fr. Job Bolivar	2000-2007
Rev. Fr. Edsel Delfin	2007-2010
Rev. Fr. Freddie Billanes	2010-ca. 2018
Rev. Fr. Berman Ibañez	ca. 2018-2024
Rev. Fr. Dennis Dexter Sontillano	2024-present

=== Naming of batches ===
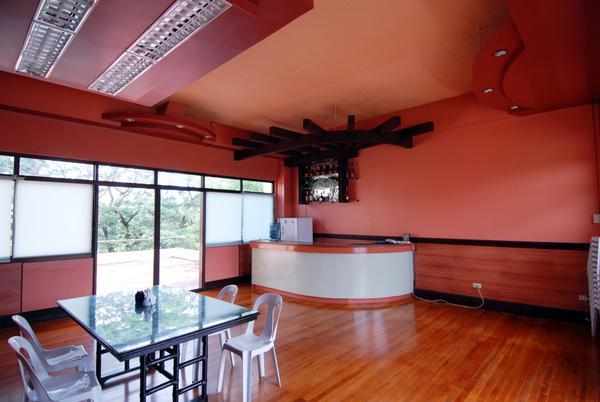
The Common Room

Pope Pius X is the patron saint of the school, but every section is obliged to have a corresponding patron saint. Batches who enter their first year with 36 or more seminarians are divided into two sections, hence, two patron saints per section. Fourth year seminarians are required to name their batch with a unique, notable name which they will carry on until college (SMMRS) or for the rest of their lives.

== Pian Alumni Association ==
The St. Pius X Seminary Alumni Association, Inc. (Pian Alumni Association), or simply known as PIANS, is a non-profit and non-stock corporation whose membership is composed of all persons who have studied for at least one year in St. Pius X Seminary. It's not an ordinary alumni association because the seminary is not an ordinary educational institution created and incorporated solely under a national law, and regulated by the appropriate government agencies, such as the Philippines' Department of Education (DepED) and Education Service Contracting (ESC), but was also created under the laws of the Catholic Church and regulated by the Vatican, and administered by the bishop through his priests. Further, its purpose is not only to educate but also to train boys and young men for the presbytery and the future leaders of the church.

Since the opening of the seminary 61 years ago, there are usually ordinations every year. Six Pians have become bishops. Though the association is composed of Pians (SPXS Alumni), it is not a religious or ecclesiastical organization or corporation like the Children of Mary, Knights of Columbus and Couples for Christ.

== Notable alumni ==
=== Politics ===
- Eleandro "Budoy" Madrona – Congressman of Romblon (1992-2001, 2007-2016).
- Jocelyn Bolante – Politician who formerly served as an Undersecretary of the Department of Agriculture of the Philippines.
- Vicente "Vic" Bermejo – Former provincial governor of Capiz and former mayor of Roxas City.
- Felipe Neri Yap – Mayor of Ivisan, Capiz.
- Gideon Ike Patricio – Former Mayor of the Municipality of Pilar
- Gerard Montojo – Mayor of the Municipality of Romblon.
- Arnold Perez - Mayor of the Municipality of Pilar, Capiz.

=== Church ===
- Cardinal Jose F. Advincula Jr. – Archbishop of Manila, Former Archbishop of Capiz.
- Victor B. Bendico – Archbishop of Capiz, Former Bishop of Baguio.
- Jose Corazon Tala-oc – Bishop-emeritus of Kalibo
- Warlito I. Cajandig – Vicar Apostolic of Calapan, Oriental Mindoro.
- Mel Rey Uy – Bishop of Lucena
- Erno Diaz – first Filipino pastor in the Archdiocese of New York and now director of the Chapel of San Lorenzo Ruiz in New York City.
- Cyril B. Villareal - Bishop of Kalibo

=== Others ===
- Florentino D. Mabasa Jr.- Outstanding Aklanon Awardee (2008)
- Geoffrey M. Martinez – President & CEO of CareHealth Plus Systems International Inc.
- Dr. Raymund O. Conlu – Nuclear Medicine, St. Luke's Medical Center, BGC.
- Capt. Donaldo "Don" Mendoza – Asst. Dir. Gen for CAAP.
- Michael Alfred V. Ignacio – Career Commercial Diplomat/ Commercial Counselor and Director. The Philippine Trade and Investment Center, Philippine Consulate General Osaka
- Fernando V. Beup Jr. – DFA Director, Office of Strategy Planning and Policy Coordination, Formerly 2nd Secretary and Consul, Philippine Embassy in India.
- Melvin Cordenillo Almonguera – 2nd Secretary and Consul, Philippine Embassy in Brunei.

=== Notable priest formators ===
- Cardinal Jaime Sin - former Roman Catholic Archbishop of Manila known for his instrumental role in the People Power Revolution, which toppled the regime of Ferdinand Marcos and installed Corazon Aquino as president of the Philippines. He was the first rector of St. Pius X Seminary.
- Raul Quimpo Martirez - Bishop-Emeritus of San Jose de Antique and Outstanding Aklanon Awardee (2008)
- Vicente Navarra - Bishop-Emeritus of the Diocese of Bacolod

== See also ==
- List of Roman Catholic Seminaries
