= Jose Corazon Tala-oc =

Filipino bishop (born 1950)

The Most Reverend Jose Corazon Tala-oc D.D., S.T.L.
- Bishop Emeritus of Kalibo
- Province: Aklan
- See: Kalibo
- Appointed: May 25, 2011
- Installed: July 20, 2011
- Retired: June 16, 2025
- Predecessor: Jose Romeo Lazo
- Successor: Cyril Villareal
- Previous post: Bishop of Romblon (2003-2011)

Orders
- Ordination: April 9, 1979 by Juan Nicolasora Nilmar
- Consecration: July 30, 2003 by Jaime Cardinal Sin

Personal details
- Born: June 16, 1950 (age 76) Tangalan, Capiz, Philippines
- Denomination: Roman Catholic
- Education: St. Pius X Seminary; University of Santo Tomas
- Motto: "In Corde Suo"
- Coat of arms: Jose Corazon Tala-oc's coat of arms

Ordination history
History
Diaconal ordination
- Ordained by: Leonardo Legaspi
Priestly ordination
- Ordained by: Juan Nicolasora Nilmar
Episcopal consecration
- Principal consecrator: Cardinal Jaime Sin
- Co-consecrators: Onesimo Cadiz Gordoncillo; Gabriel V. Reyes
- Styles
- Reference style: His Excellency; The Most Reverend
- Spoken style: Your Excellency
- Religious style: Bishop

Jose Corazon Tumbagahan Tala-oc (born June 16, 1950) is a Filipino bishop of the Roman Catholic Church who served as the bishop of the Roman Catholic Diocese of Kalibo from 2011 to 2025. Prior to this, he was the bishop of the Diocese of Romblon from 2003 to 2011.

== Early life and education ==
Jose Corazon Tala-oc was born in Tagas, Tangalan, Capiz (now part of Aklan), on June 16, 1950. He completed his elementary and secondary education in Tangalan before pursuing philosophical studies at St. Pius X Seminary in Roxas City until 1975. He later studied theology at the University of Santo Tomas in Manila, where he earned a Licentiate in Sacred Theology in 1979.

== Priesthood ==
Tala-oc was ordained as a priest on April 9, 1979, for the Diocese of Kalibo. His early ministry included serving as an assistant parish priest in Ibajay, Aklan from 1979 to 1980 before becoming a parish priest in Nabas, Aklan, a role he held for twelve years from 1980 to 1992. From 1992 to 1994, he was the dean of theology and treasurer of Aklan College, and from 1994 to 1997, he served as parish priest of Saint John the Baptist Cathedral Parish in Kalibo, Aklan. In 1997, he was appointed rector of the Sto. Niño Seminary, a position he held until 2001, when he was subsequently appointed vicar general of the diocese.

His involvement in diocesan initiatives extended to biblical education, where he served as the director of the diocesan Biblical Apostolate from 1980 to 1988 before resuming the position in 1992. In addition, he was a member of the Board of Trustees of Aklan College from 1992 to 1993 and served as a member of the Board of Consultors of the Diocese of Aklan from 1993 to 2003.

== Episcopal ministry ==
On June 11, 2003, Pope John Paul II appointed Tala-oc as the bishop of Romblon, where he served for eight years. He received his episcopal consecration on July 30, 2003, with Archbishop Jaime Sin of the Archdiocese of Manila as the principal consecrator. Archbishop Onesimo Cadiz Gordoncillo of Capiz and bishop Gabriel V. Reyes of Antipolo served as co-consecrators.

On May 25, 2011, Pope Benedict XVI appointed him as the bishop of Kalibo, succeeding Jose Romeo Lazo, who had been transferred to the Diocese of San Jose de Antique. His formal installation took place at the Kalibo Cathedral on July 20, 2011, officiated by Archbishop Onesimo Gordoncillo of Capiz.

Within the Catholic Bishops' Conference of the Philippines, he was the vice-chairman of the Episcopal Commission on Ecumenical Affairs from 2013 to 2015. He was also the vice chairman of the Commission on Indigenous Peoples from 2019 to 2025.

Pope Leo XIV accepted his resignation on June 16, 2025, his seventy-fifth birthday, and appointed Victor Bendico, the Archbishop of Capiz, as Kalibo's apostolic administrator. Tala-oc's successor, Cyril Villareal, was appointed in January 2026.

== Advocacy ==
Bishop Tala-oc is a strong advocate for environmental protection, social justice, and disaster response, addressing key issues in his dioceses. As Bishop of Romblon, he opposed large-scale mining operations, warning against their environmental and social consequences, and urged people to be "faithful stewards of creation". After his transfer to Kalibo, he continued his advocacy by opposing reclamation projects in Caticlan and casino operations in Boracay, both in Malay, Aklan. In a pastoral letter dated September 17, 2021, he urged national and local leaders to reject casino establishments, warning they could undermine moral values and lead to gambling addiction and social exploitation.

Catholic Church titles
Preceded by Arturo Bastes	Bishop of Romblon; September 3, 2003 – July 20, 2011	Succeeded by Narciso Abellana
Preceded by Jose Romeo Lazo	Bishop of Kalibo; July 20, 2011 – June 16, 2025	Succeeded by Cyril Villareal
