= San Vigilio, Rome =

San Vigilio
- Church of Saint Vigilius
- Chiesa Parocchiale di San Vigilio
- Click on the map for a fullscreen view
- 41°49′46″N 12°29′32″E
- Location: Via Paolo Di Dono 218, Rome
- Country: Italy
- Language: Italian
- Denomination: Catholic
- Tradition: Roman Rite

History
- Status: titular church
- Founded: 1968
- Dedication: Vigilius of Trent

Architecture
- Architect: Lucio Passarelli
- Architectural type: Modern
- Completed: 1990

Administration
- Diocese: Rome

The church of San Vigilio in Rome is a Catholic place of worship located on Via Paolo Di Dono serving the parish of that name. Its eponymous patron is Saint Vigilius of Trent.

The parish was erected on 22 May 1968 by Cardinal Vicar Angelo Dell'Acqua and entrusted first to the clergy of the Archdiocese of Trento and then to the diocesan clergy of the Diocese of Rome.

The building the parish uses for its liturgies is contemporary in style, designed by Studio Passarelli. Construction began in 1983 and was completed in 1993. It is built of concrete with steel supports and appears compact in volume and modest in height. The semicircular central hall has a floor that slopes down toward the sanctuary. Glass panels behind the altar open to an area for outdoor liturgies with several tiers for seating in the style of an amphitheater. The parish rectory and offices are housed above the hall.

From 1992 to 1997, the parochial vicar was Rev. Augusto Paolo Lojudice, later a cardinal and Archbishop of Siena. Pope John Paul II visited the church on 7 November 1993.

Pope Francis designated the parish as a titular church on 28 November 2020, appointing Jose Advincula of the Philippines as Cardinal Patron.

== Cardinal priests ==
- Jose Fuerte Advincula (28 November 2020 – present)
