= Roxas Cathedral =

Roman Catholic church in Capiz, Philippines

- Metropolitan Cathedral and Archdiocesan Shrine of the Immaculate Conception
- Catedral Metropolitana y Santuario Arquidiocesano de la Inmaculada Concepción (Spanish); Kalakhang Katedral at Dambanang pang Arkidyocesis ng Kalinis-linisang Paglilihi (Filipino)
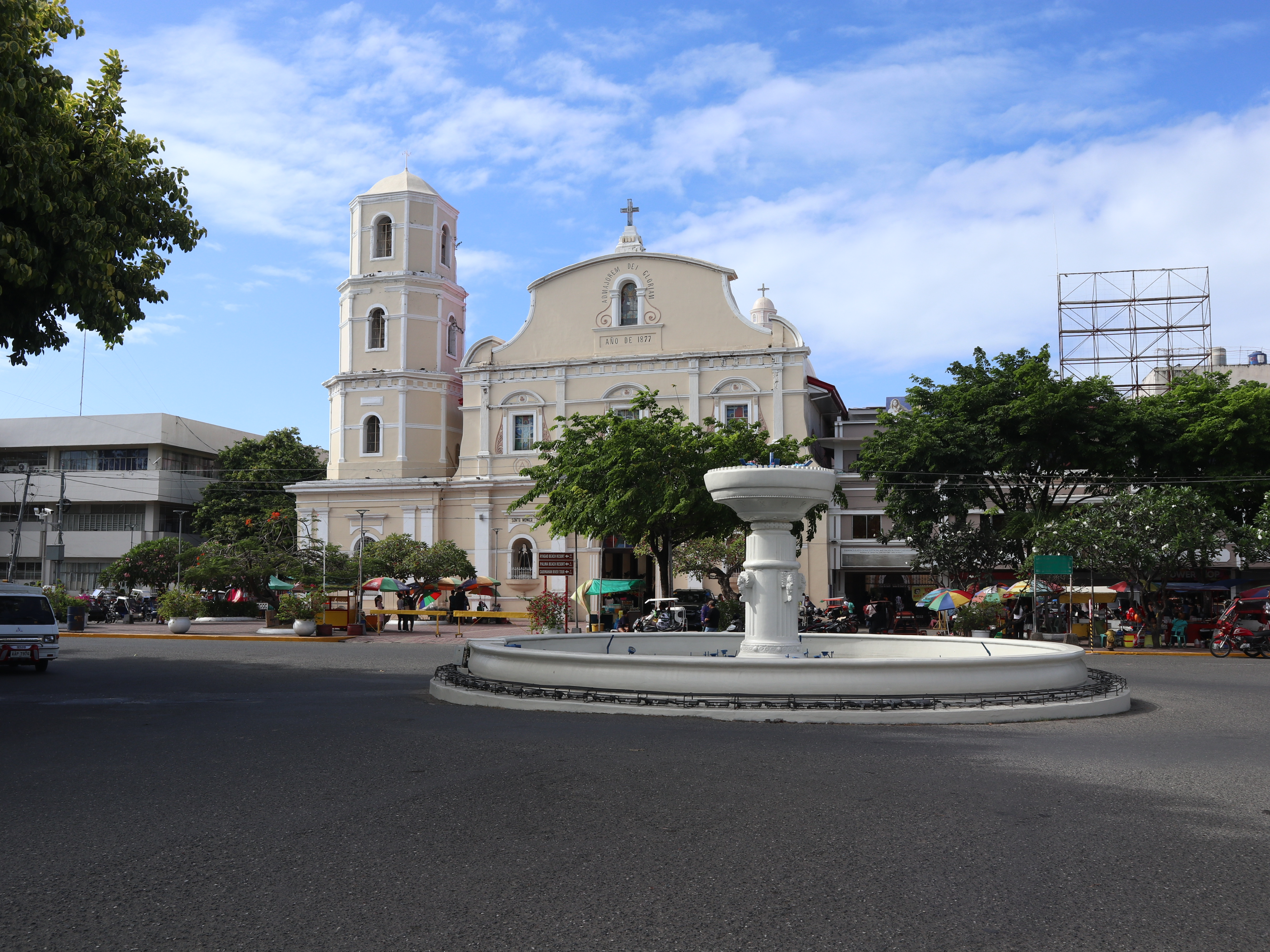
- Cathedral facade in 2024

- Location in the Visayas Location in the Philippines
- 11°35′01″N 122°45′11″E
- Location: Roxas, Capiz
- Country: Philippines
- Language(s): Hiligaynon, English, Filipino
- Denomination: Roman Catholic

History
- Status: Cathedral, Archdiocesan Shrine
- Founded: 1707, 1827
- Dedication: Immaculate Conception
- Consecrated: 1707

Architecture
- Functional status: Active
- Architectural type: Church building
- Style: Baroque
- Completed: 1827, 1954 (Reconstruction)

Administration
- Province: Capiz
- Metropolis: Capiz
- Archdiocese: Capiz
- Deanery: Immaculate Conception
- Parish: Immaculate Conception

Clergy
- Archbishop: Most Rev. Victor Barnuevo Bendico, D.D.
- Rector: Rev. Fr. Edsel Delfin

The Metropolitan Cathedral and Archdiocesan Shrine of the Immaculate Conception, commonly known as the Roxas Cathedral (Hiligaynon: Katedral sang Roxas), is a Roman Catholic church in the city of Roxas, Capiz, in central Philippines. It is the seat of the Archdiocese of Capiz.

The parish church was elevated into a cathedral following the creation of the Diocese of Capiz on January 27, 1951. However, the diocese retained the old name of Capiz as it predates the change of the city name to Roxas on April 11, 1951.

== History ==
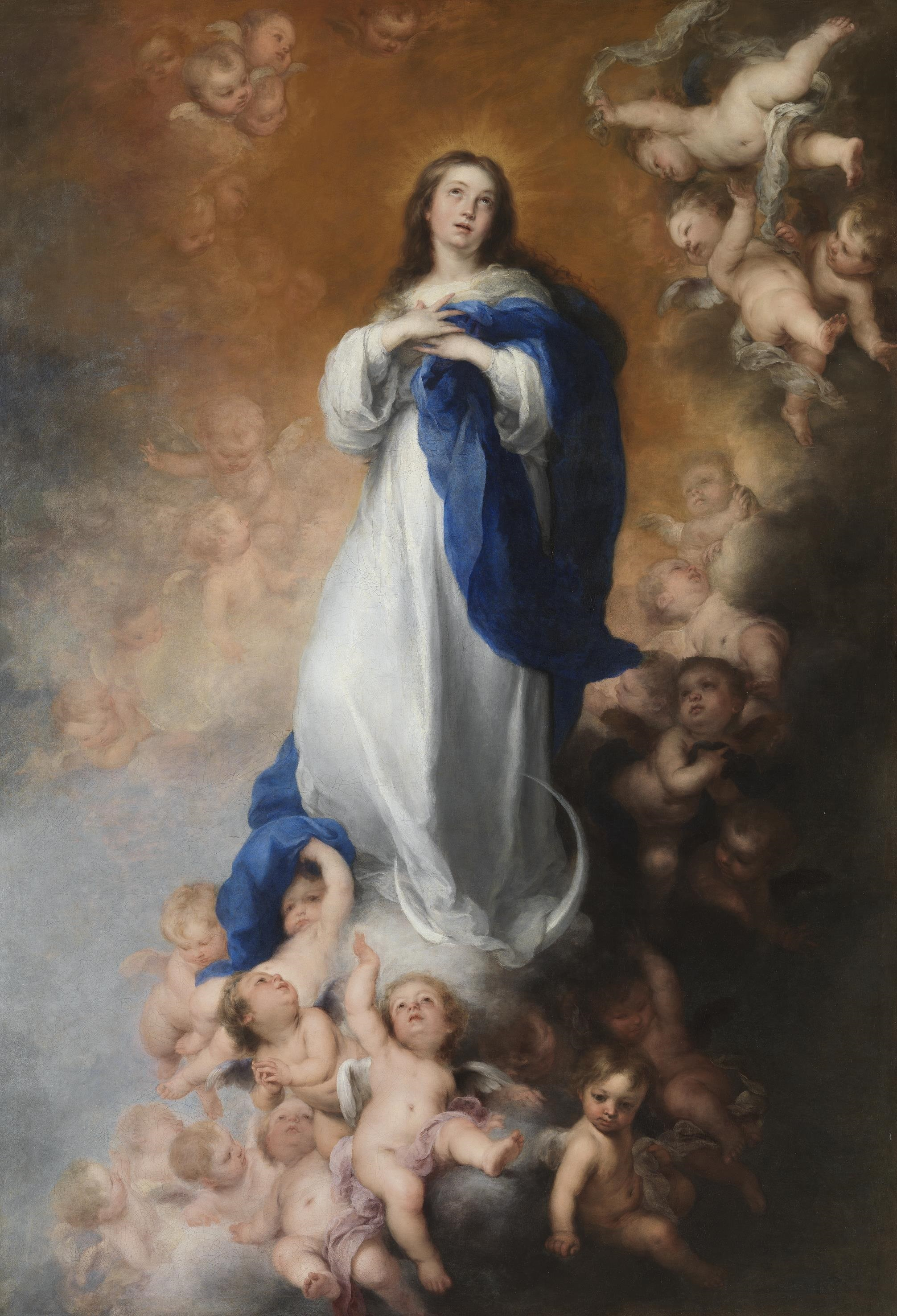
The Blessed Virgin Mary under the doctrine and title of Immaculate Conception is the titular of the cathedral.

The church and parish of Roxas City (then named as Municipality of Capiz) is one of the oldest in Panay Island, having been founded by Augustinian missionaries in 1707.

The cathedral, as it was in its first inception, is in the historic center of Roxas City and fronts the city plaza, opposite the Panay River and the Capiz Bridge.

The current structure was built in 1827. In 1898, it was within the diocese of Jaro, being run by secular priests. Loctugan and Ivisan were Capiz's visitas. From 1918 to 1920, Gabriel Reyes, (who became Bishop of Cebu in 1932 and Archbishop of Manila in 1949) served as its parish priest. The cathedral had undergone restoration and reconstruction works in 1954.

In the November 28, 2020, consistory, Archbishop Jose Lazaro Fuerte Advincula became the first Archbishop of Capiz to be created as a cardinal but received his red biretta and ring from Archbishop Charles John Brown, the Apostolic Nuncio to the Philippines, only on June 18, 2021, at the cathedral. Before this, he was named the 33rd Archbishop of Manila on March 25, 2021.

On May 3, 2023, Bishop Victor Barnuevo Bendico, formerly the Bishop of Baguio, was installed as the new Archbishop of Capiz in the same cathedral after he was appointed by Pope Francis on March 3, 2023.

On December 8, 2023, the venerated image of the Immaculate Conception was episcopally crowned. The cathedral would later be elevated to the status of "Archdiocesan Shrine" on December 8, 2025.

== Gallery ==
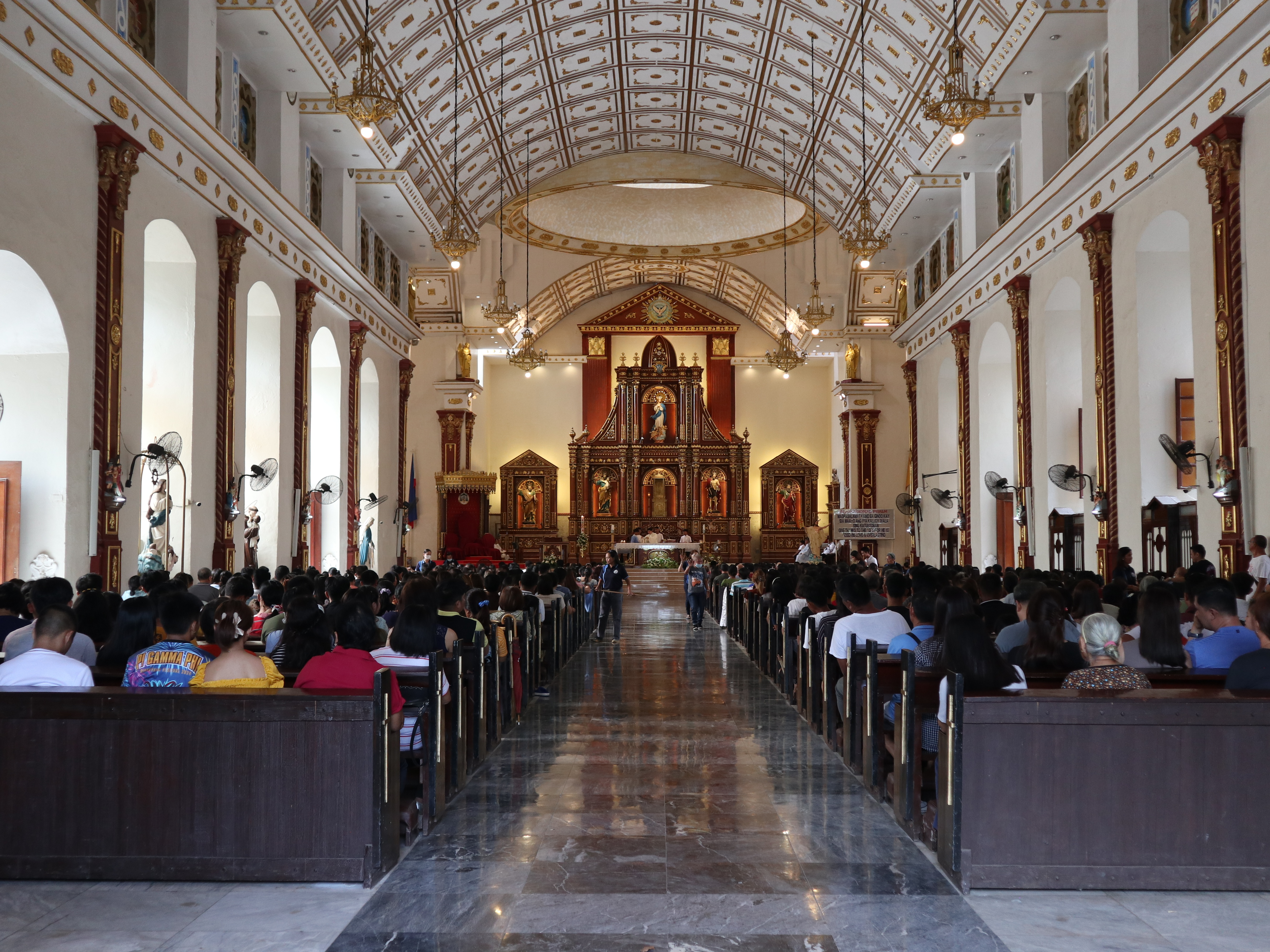
Church interior in 2024

== See also ==
- Panay Church
