= Panay Church =

Roman Catholic church in Capiz, Philippines

- Santa Monica Parish Church
- Iglesia Parroquial de Santa Mónica (Spanish)
- Simbahan sang Parokya sang Santa Mónica (Hiligaynon); Simbahang Parokya ni Santa Mónica (Filipino)
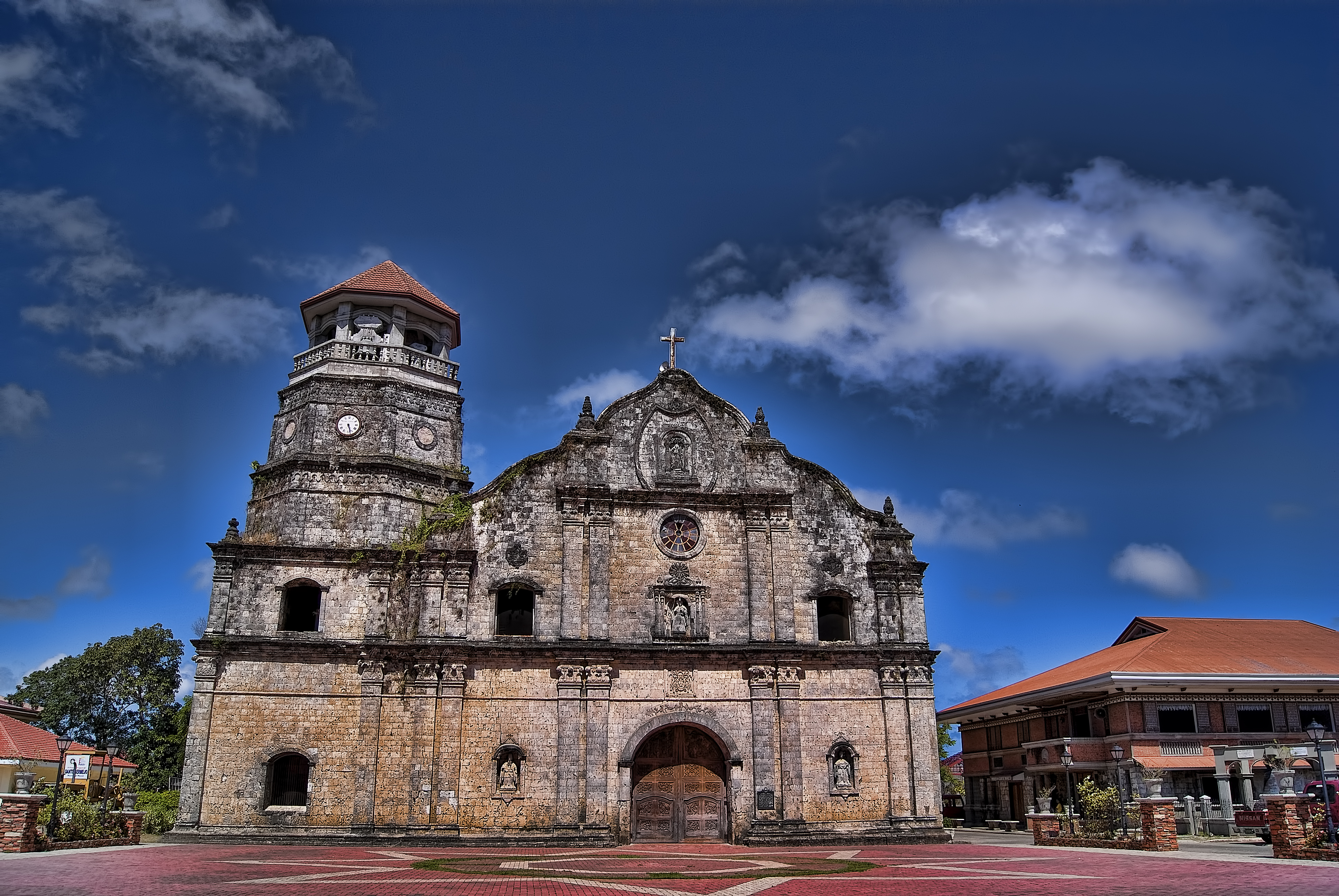
- Church façade

- Location in the Visayas Location in the Philippines
- 11°33′20″N 122°47′38″E
- Location: Iloilo East Coast-Capiz Rd., Panay, Capiz
- Country: Philippines
- Language(s): Hiligaynon, English
- Denomination: Roman Catholic

History
- Founded: 1698
- Founder: Augustinian Friars
- Dedication: Saint Monica

Architecture
- Functional status: Active
- Heritage designation: National Historical Landmark; National Cultural Treasure
- Designated: 1997 _{National Historical Landmark}; 2004 _{National Cultural Treasure}
- Architectural type: Church building
- Style: Filipino Colonial Neo-Classical Baroque

Specifications
- Length: 70 m (230 ft)
- Width: 25 m (82 ft)
- Height: 18 m (59 ft)

Administration
- Province: Capiz
- Metropolis: Capiz
- Archdiocese: Capiz
- Deanery: Santa Monica
- Parish: Santa Monica

Santa Monica Parish Church, commonly known as Panay Church, is a historic Roman Catholic church in Panay, Capiz on Panay island of the Philippines. It is under the jurisdiction of the Archdiocese of Capiz. It was built in 1884 on the site of an earlier church, built in 1774 by Miguel Murguia, which was gravely damaged by the typhoon of January 17, 1875. The church is built of coral blocks and is approximately 70 metres long, 25 m in width and 18 m in height; the walls are about 3 metres thick.

The church has an unusually large bell, the largest in the country. Capiz hosts Asia's biggest “church” bell. This was cast by Juan Reina in about 1884, using sacks of coin given by the people of the town; it weighs more than 10 tonnes. According to Alicia M. L. Coseteng, it has Tequitqui influence which in an art style syncretizing Mexican and Spanish art.

In 1997 the church was declared a National Historical Landmark by the National Historical Commission of the Philippines.

== Gallery ==
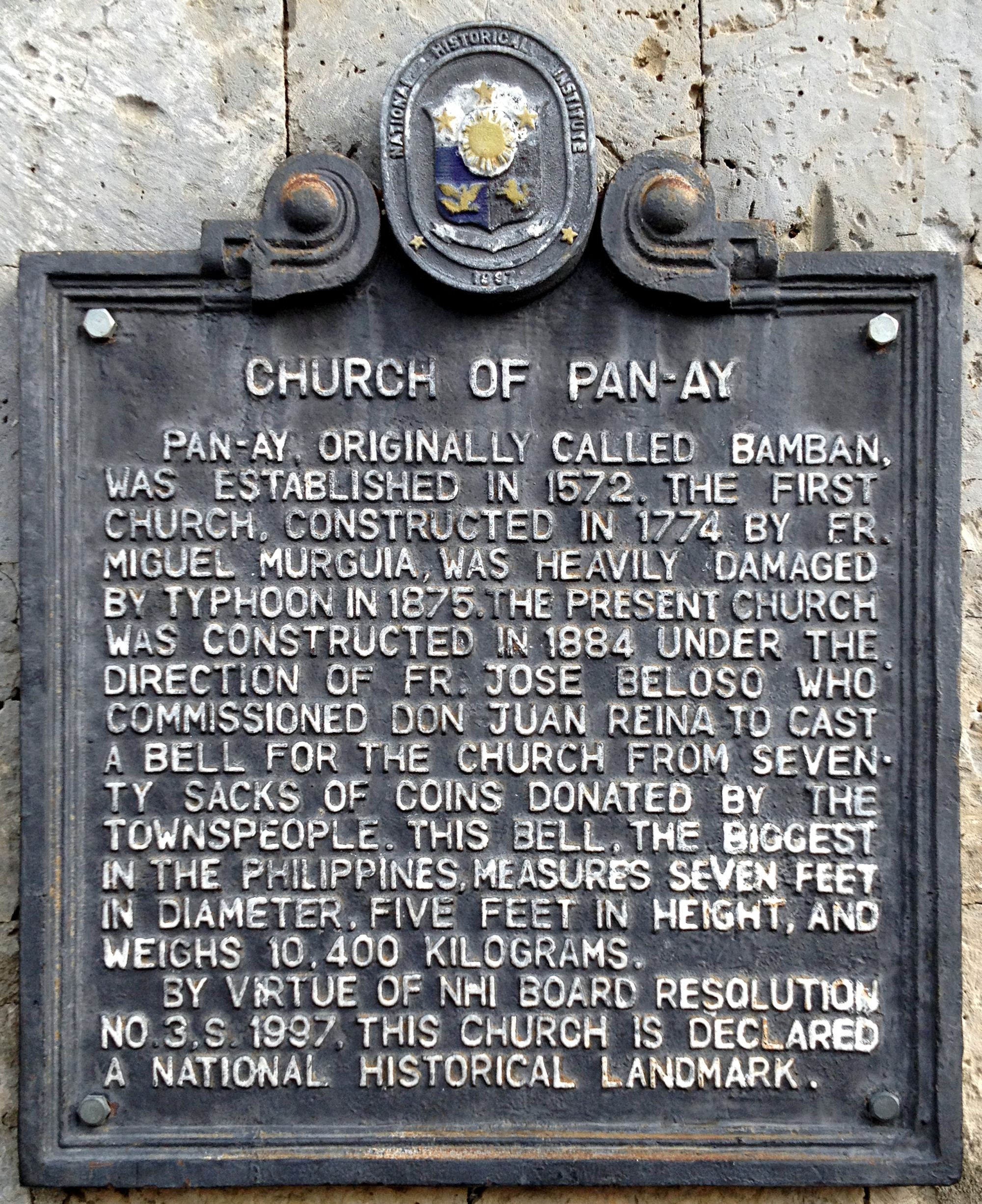
Church NHI historical marker installed in 1997

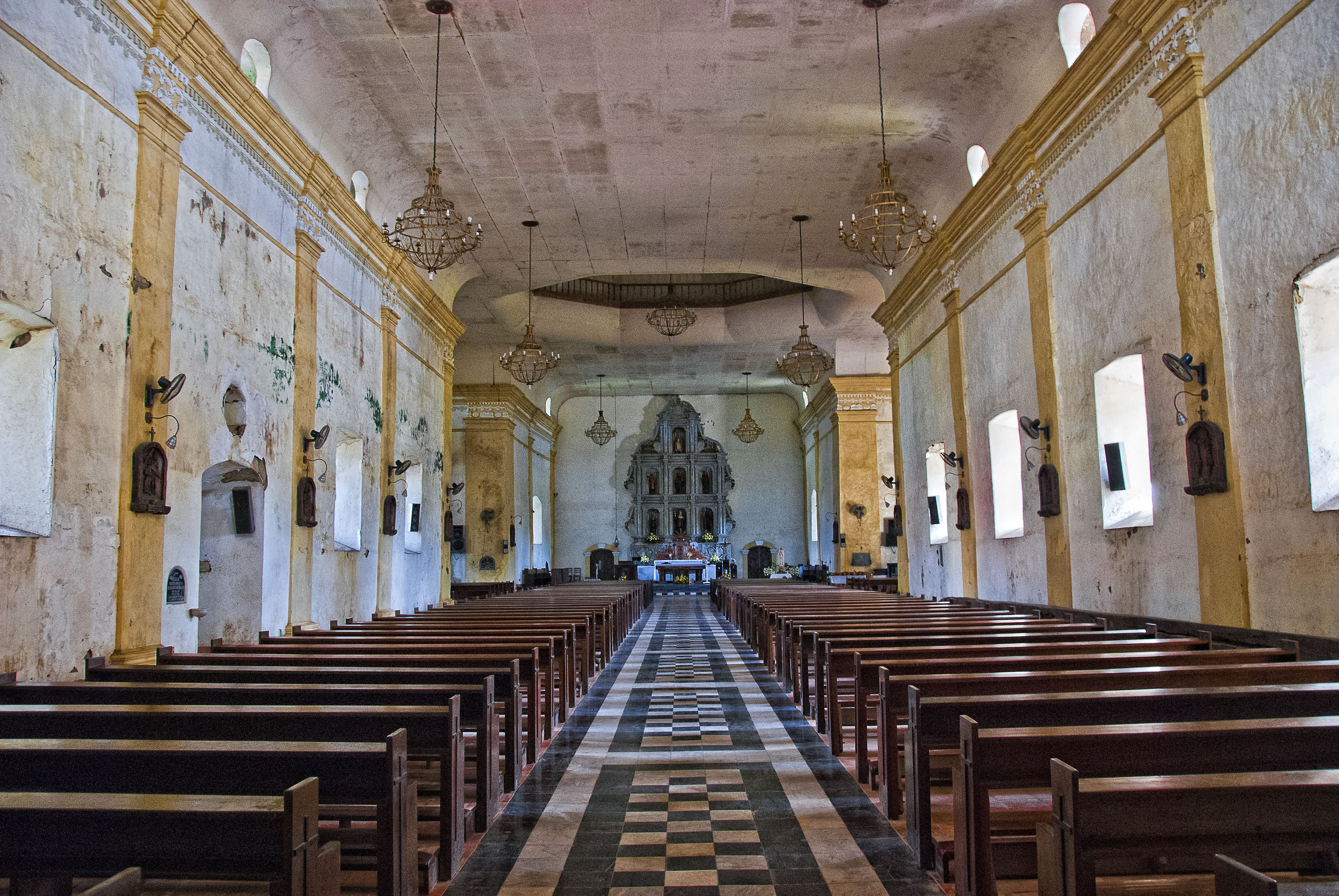
Church interior in 2008

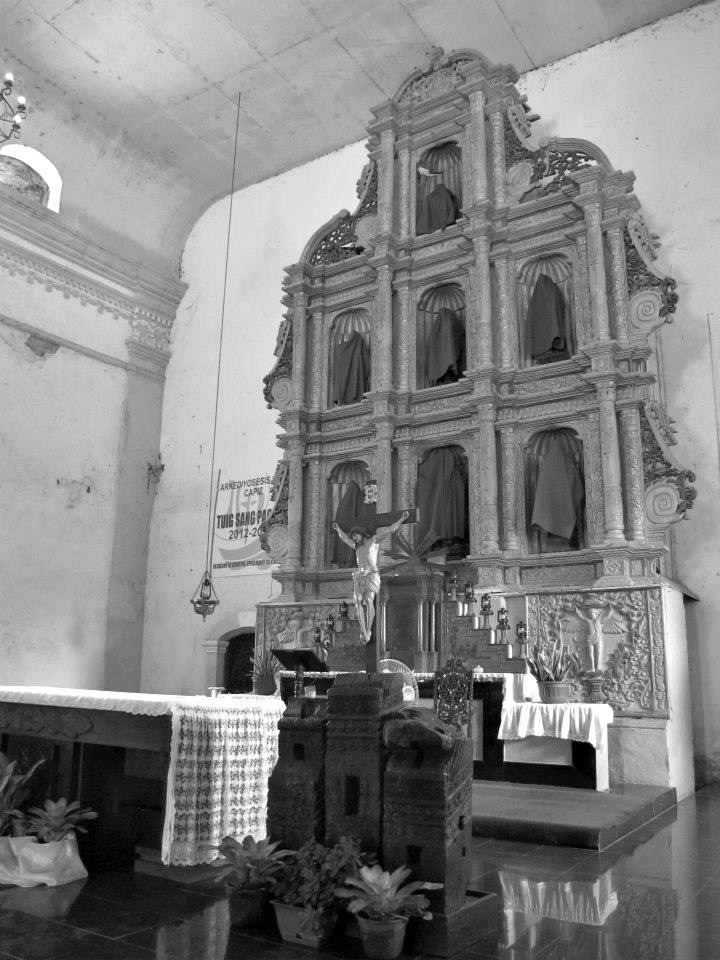
Main altar

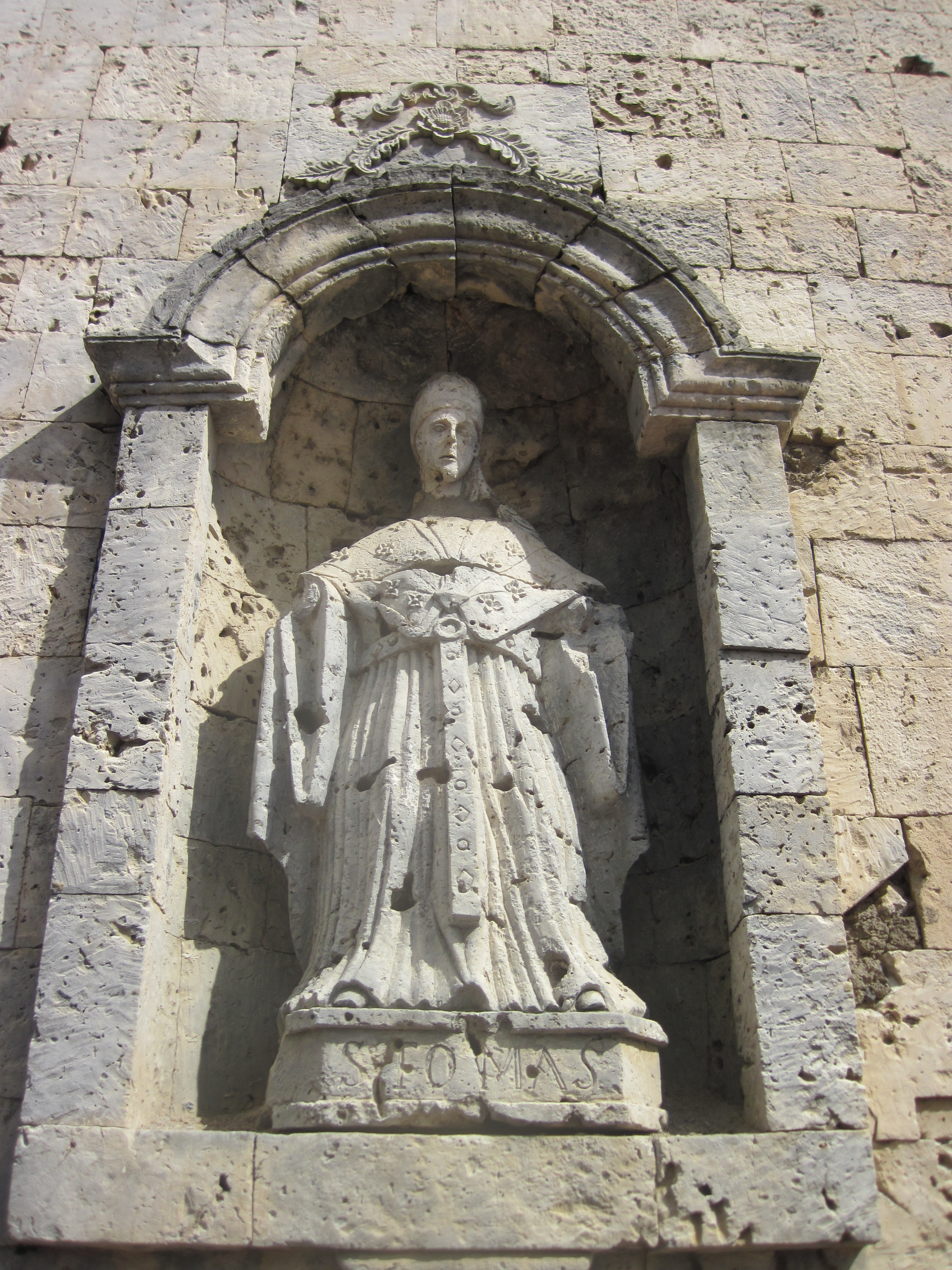
Statue of Santo Tomas de Villanueva

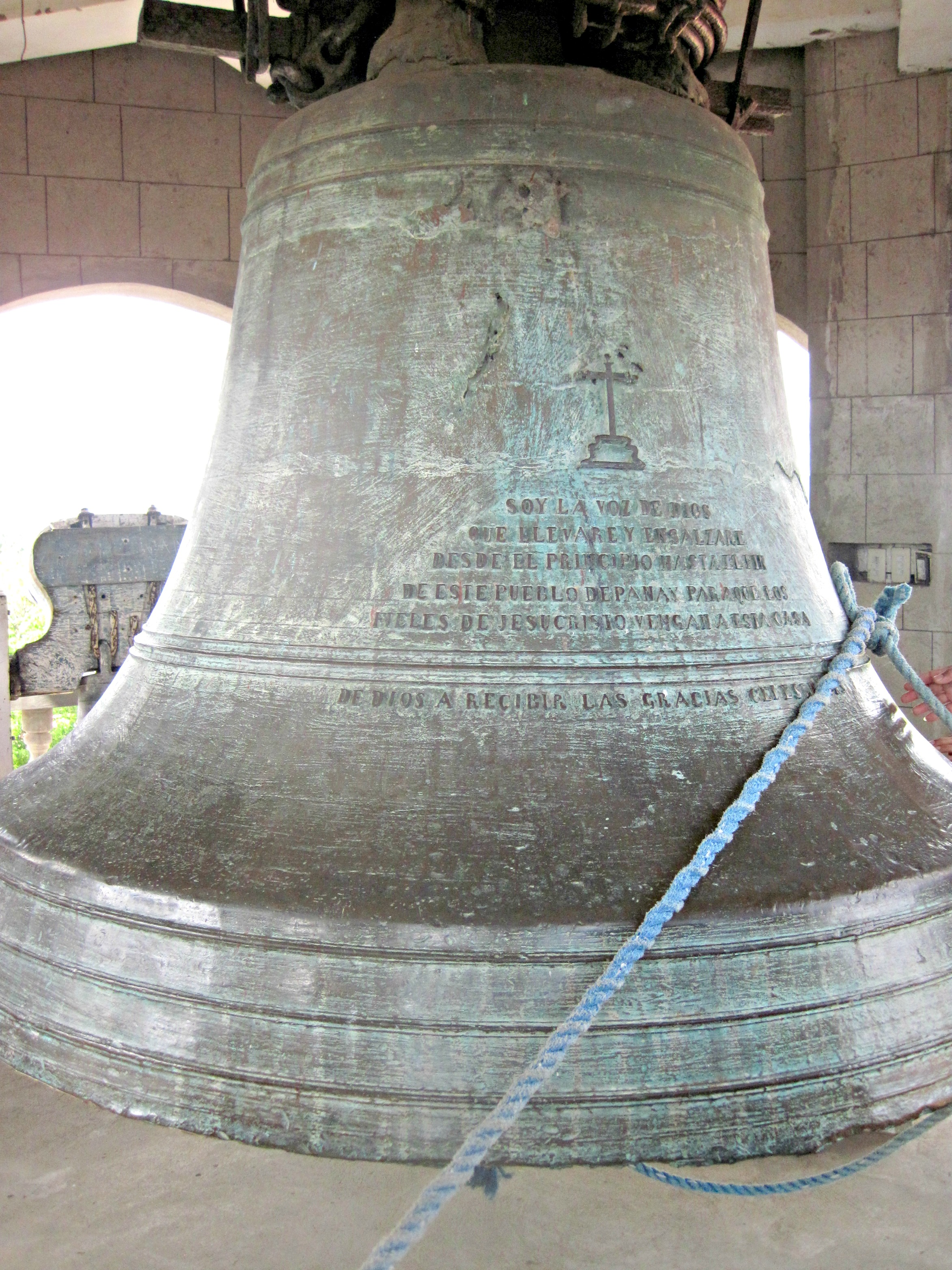
The large bell

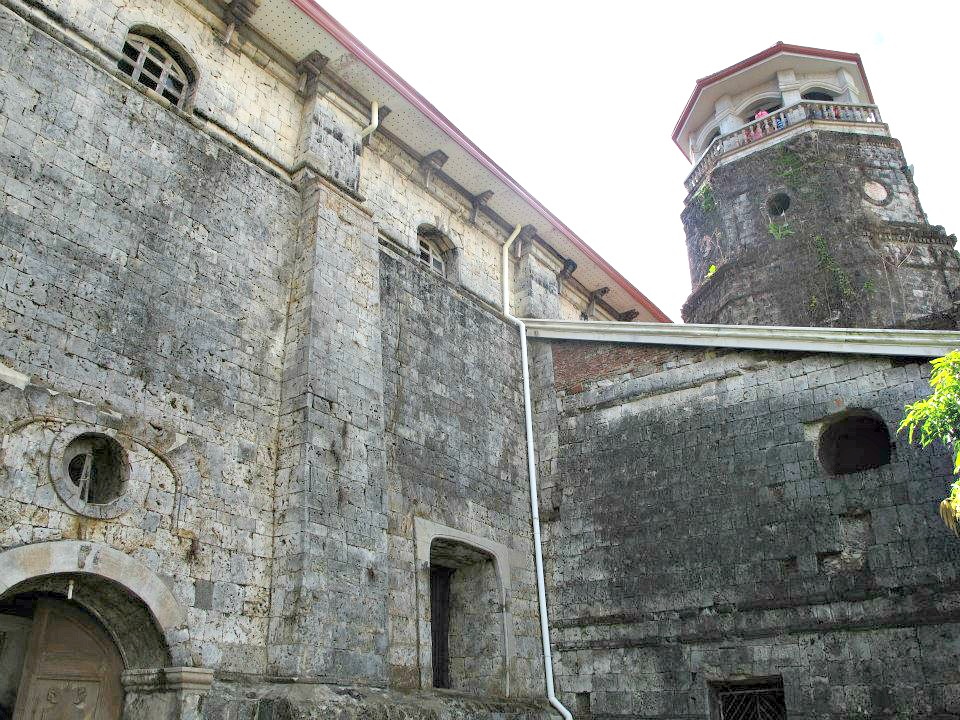
West side of the church

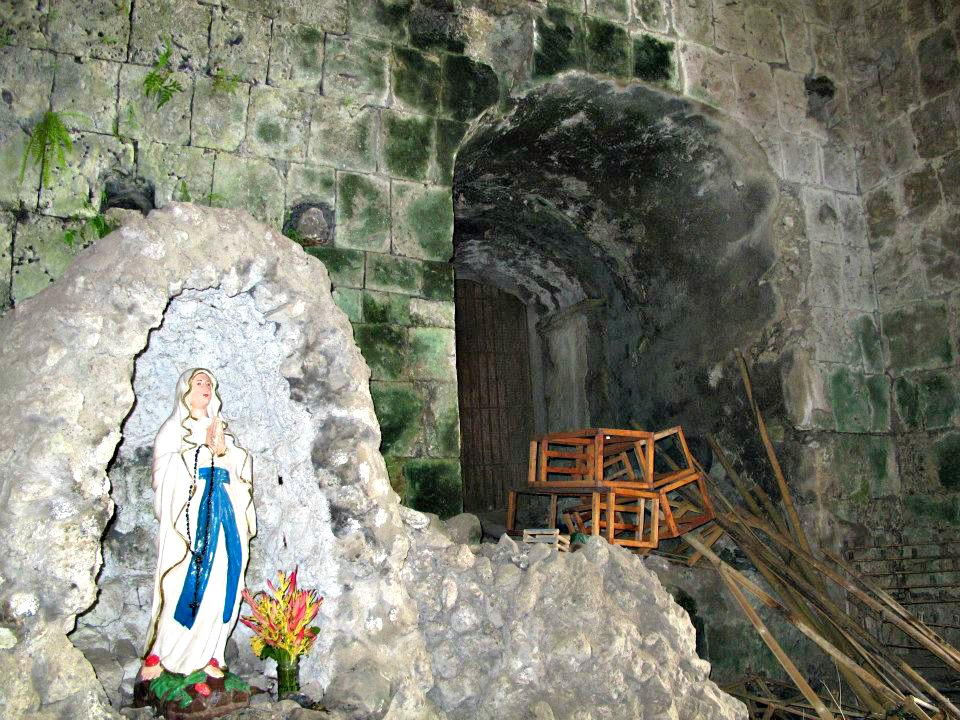
Our Lady of Lourdes Grotto at the foot of the bell tower

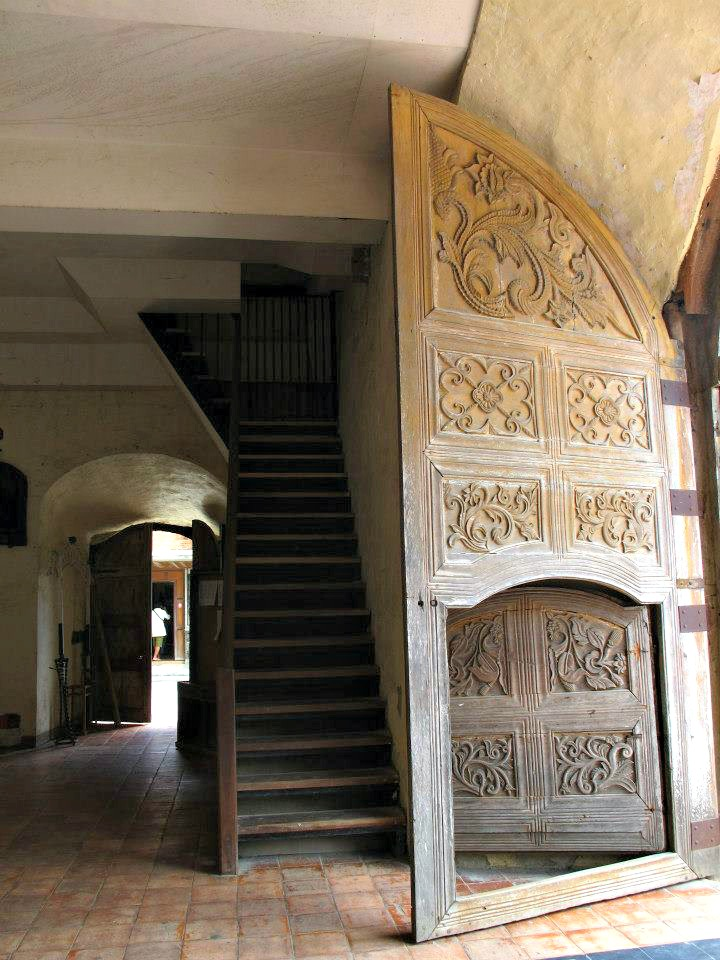
Stairway to the choir loft

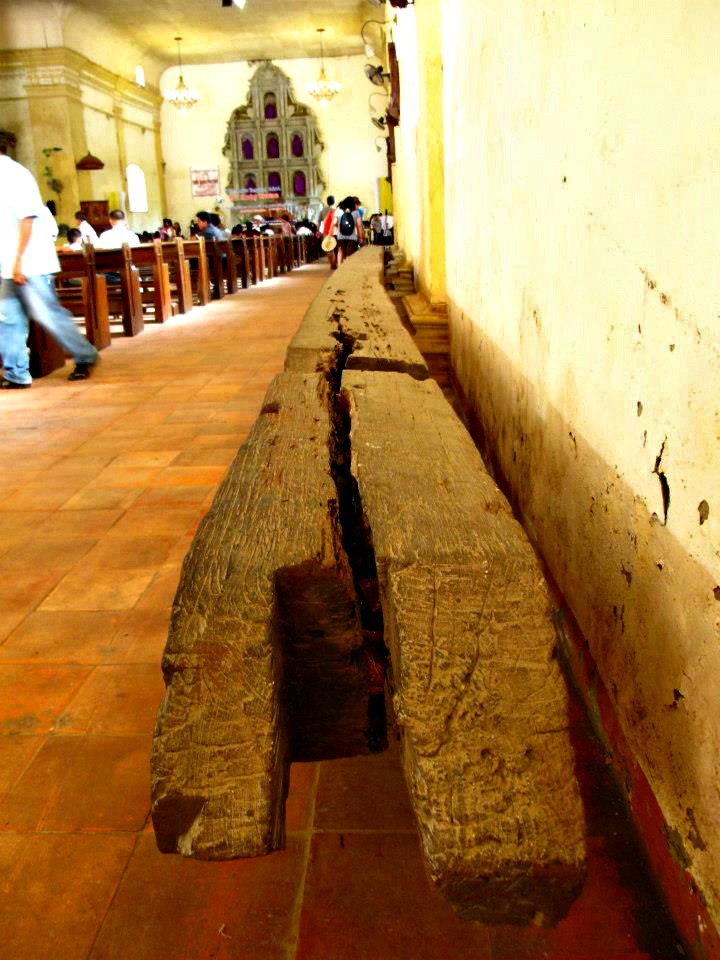
Former roof truss of the church

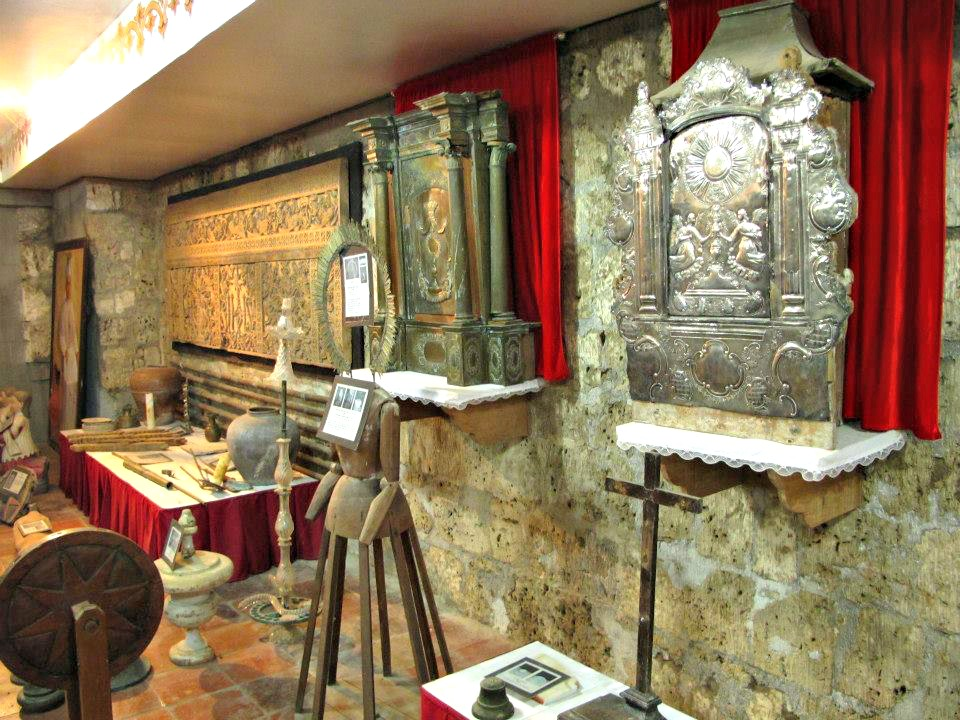
Artefacts

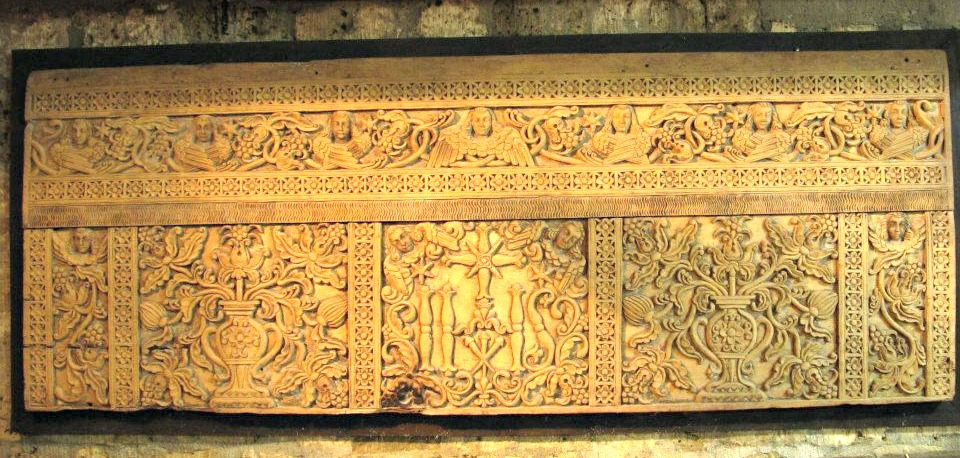
Bas-relief by Joseph Bergaño, 1770s

== See also ==
- Roxas Cathedral
