= Jose Advincula =

Filipino archbishop and cardinal (born 1952)

His Eminence Jose Advincula OP
- Cardinal; Metropolitan Archbishop of Manila
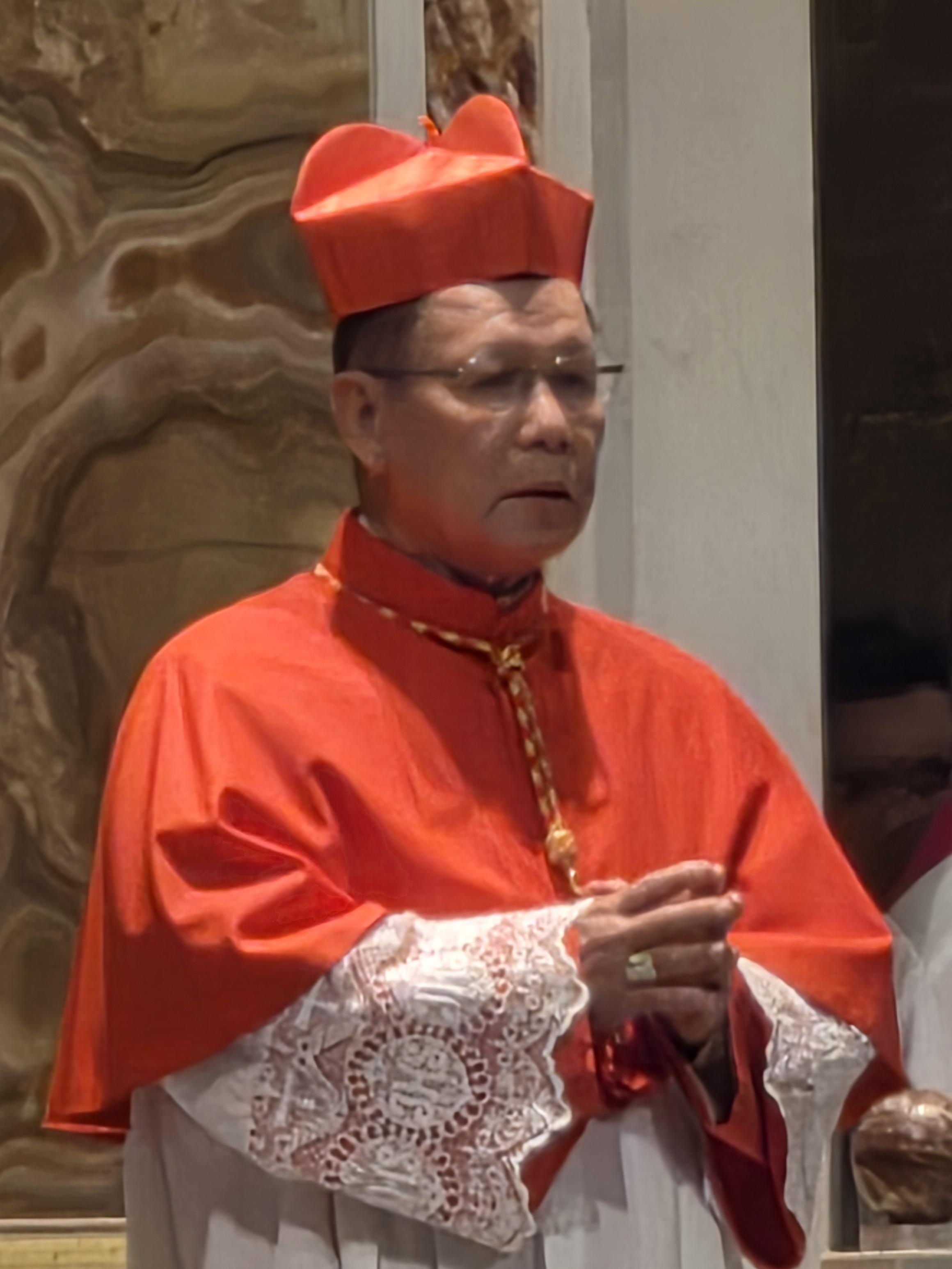
- Advincula in 2025
- Church: Roman Catholic Church
- Archdiocese: Manila
- See: Manila
- Appointed: March 25, 2021
- Installed: June 24, 2021
- Predecessor: Luis Antonio Tagle
- Other posts: Cardinal Priest of San Vigilio (2020–present); Member, Dicastery for the Clergy (2020–present); Member, Dicastery for Bishops (2022–present); Chairman, CBCP Commission on the Pontificio Collegio Filippino (2025–present)
- Previous posts: Bishop of San Carlos (2001–2011); Archbishop of Capiz (2012–2021); Chairman, CBCP Episcopal Office on Women (2013–2019); Chairman, CBCP Permanent Committee on International Eucharistic Congresses (2021–2025)

Orders
- Ordination: April 4, 1976 by Antonio Floro Frondosa
- Consecration: September 8, 2001 by Antonio Franco
- Created cardinal: November 28, 2020 by Pope Francis
- Rank: Cardinal priest

Personal details
- Born: Jose Fuerte Advincula Jr. March 30, 1952 (age 74) Dumalag, Capiz, Philippines
- Residence: Palacio Arzobispal
- Education: St. Pius X Seminary; University of Santo Tomas (BA); De La Salle University (MAEd); Pontifical University of Saint Thomas Aquinas (JCL)
- Motto: Audiam (Latin for 'I will listen') (Note: From 1 Samuel 3:10, "Your servant is listening")
- Signature: Jose Advincula's signature

Ordination history
History
Priestly ordination
- Ordained by: Antonio Floro Frondosa (Capiz)
Episcopal consecration
- Principal consecrator: Antonio Franco (Philippines Apos. Nunc.)
- Co-consecrators: Onesimo Cadiz Gordoncillo (Capiz); Angel Lagdameo (Jaro)
Cardinalate
- Elevated by: Pope Francis
Episcopal succession
Bishops consecrated by Jose Advincula as principal consecrator
- Mel Rey Uy: November 8, 2017
- Elias Ayuban, CMF: December 3, 2024
- Styles
- Reference style: His Eminence
- Spoken style: Your Eminence
- Religious style: Cardinal
- Informal style: Cardinal
- See: Manila

Jose Fuerte Advincula Jr. (born March 30, 1952) is a Filipino prelate and the archbishop of Manila. Pope Francis made him a cardinal in 2020.

== Early life and studies ==
Advincula was born on March 30, 1952, in Dumalag, Capiz, to Jose Firmalino Advincula and Carmen Falsis Fuerte. He studied at Saint Pius X Seminary High School in Roxas City where Jaime Sin became his teacher. He earned a bachelor's degree in theology at the University of Santo Tomas in Manila.

He later studied at De La Salle University, where he earned a Master of Arts (MA) degree in education, Major in Guidance and Counseling. He then studied canon law at the Angelicum in Rome, where he earned his licentiate. During these studies he temporarily joined the Order of Preachers.

== Ministry ==
=== Priesthood ===
He was ordained a priest of the Archdiocese of Capiz on April 4, 1976. He worked as spiritual director of St. Pius X Seminary while also professor and dean of studies.

After finishing his studies abroad, he returned to the Philippines and worked at the seminary of Nueva Segovia in Vigan, Ilocos Sur, and in the regional seminary of Jaro. In 1995, he became rector of St. Pius X Seminary of Capiz; he also held positions in the administration of the archdiocese as defender of the bond, promoter of justice, and judicial vicar. In 1999, he became parish priest of Santo Tomás de Villanueva Parish in Dao, Capiz.

=== Bishop of San Carlos (2001–2011) ===
Pope John Paul II appointed him bishop of San Carlos in Negros Occidental on July 25, 2001, and he received his episcopal consecration on September 8 before taking possession of the see three days later. During his tenure in San Carlos, he opened ten mission stations in remote areas. From 2003 to 2011, he was a member of the Episcopal Commission on Indigenous Peoples of the Catholic Bishops' Conference of the Philippines (CBCP), as well as its Episcopal Commission on the Doctrine of the Faith from 2005 to 2013.

=== Archbishop of Capiz (2012–2021) ===
On November 9, 2011, Pope Benedict XVI named him archbishop of Capiz. He was installed at the Immaculate Conception Metropolitan Cathedral in Roxas City on January 11, 2012. Advincula and fellow archbishops Luis Antonio Tagle of Manila, John F. Du of Palo, and Romulo Valles of Davao received the pallium from Benedict XVI on June 29, 2012, in Rome.

==== Elevation to cardinalate ====
Pope Francis created him as a cardinal in a consistory on November 28, 2020, assigning him as a cardinal priest to San Vigilio in Via Paolo Di Dono. He was not able to attend the consistory because of COVID-19 pandemic risks and restrictions. In lieu of the consistory, Advincula received his scarlet biretta and ring from Charles John Brown, the Apostolic Nuncio to the Philippines, on June 18, 2021, at the Immaculate Conception Metropolitan Cathedral in Roxas City.

On December 16, 2020, he was named a member of the Congregation for the Clergy.

==== Tumandok killings ====
On January 15, 2021, all eight bishops in the ecclesiastical provinces of Capiz and Jaro—namely, Advincula, Jose Romeo Lazo, Jose Corazon Tala-oc, Narciso Abellana, Marvyn Maceda, Patricio Buzon, Gerardo Alminaza, and Louie Galbines—issued a joint pastoral letter calling for an investigation to the joint military and police operation in the towns of Tapaz in Capiz and Calinog in Iloilo on December 30, 2020, that killed nine leaders of the Tumandok indigenous people's group that opposes the Jalaur mega dam project. The families of the victims claimed that they are victims of red-tagging and that firearms and explosives were planted. The pastoral letter was read on January 24.

=== Archbishop of Manila (2021–present) ===
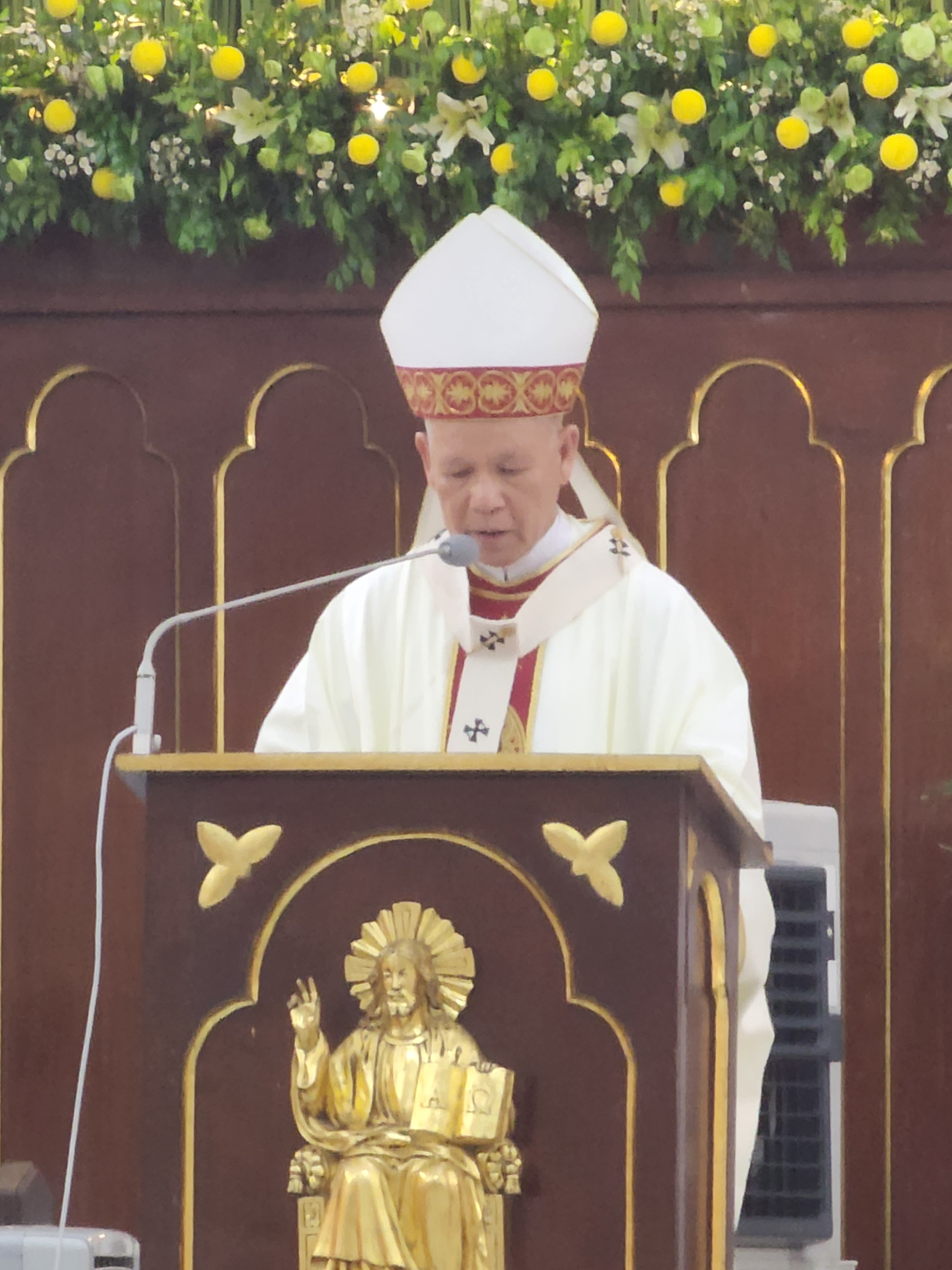
Advincula delivering the homily at Pinaglabanan Church in San Juan on June 24, 2024.

Pope Francis appointed Advincula as archbishop of Manila on March 25, 2021, the Feast of the Annunciation. He succeeded Luis Antonio Tagle, who vacated the post on February 9, 2020, after being appointed prefect of the Congregation for the Evangelization of Peoples on December 8, 2019. He is the first archbishop of Manila to be already a cardinal upon appointment to the see. (Note: Advincula was named Cardinal in November 2020, and was appointed as Archbishop of Manila in March 2021) Past Manila archbishops were made cardinals after their installation. (Note: Rufino Santos became Cardinal in 1960, seven years after being installed as Archbishop of Manila in 1953; Jaime Sin became Cardinal in 1976, two years after being installed Archbishop of Manila in 1974; Gaudencio Rosales became Cardinal in 2006, more than two years after being installed as Archbishop of Manila in 2003; Luis Antonio Tagle became Cardinal in 2012, almost a year after being installed as Archbishop of Manila in 2011.)

Advincula was installed on June 24, 2021, the feast day of Saint John the Baptist, by Archbishop Charles John Brown, apostolic nuncio to the Philippines, together with Cardinals Gaudencio Rosales and Orlando Quevedo. He is the 33rd Archbishop of Manila, and the sixth native Filipino to hold the post, following centuries of Spanish, American, and Irish prelates. His installation coincided with the 450th Founding Anniversary of the City of Manila, and the death of former President Benigno Aquino III, which led Advincula to offer prayers towards the end of the Mass. Advincula and Brown visited Aquino's wake at the Church of the Gesù in Quezon City the next day.

On December 8, 2021, the Feast of the Immaculate Conception, Advincula received the pallium as metropolitan archbishop of the ecclesiastical province of Manila from Pope Francis, through Archbishop Brown.

On December 11, 2021, Advincula made his solemn profession as a professed member of the Priestly Fraternities of St. Dominic, a society of apostolic life under the Order of Preachers.

On April 30, 2022, Advincula was installed cardinal priest of Parrocchia San Vigilio in Rome, Italy. On July 13, 2022, Pope Francis named him a member of the Dicastery for Bishops.

On June 3, 2023, Advincula received an honorary doctorate degree from De La Salle University.

Advincula was chosen by the Catholic Bishops Conference of the Philippines to be one of the delegates of the Philippines to the Universal Phase of the Synod on Synodality, which took place at the Vatican in October 2023 and October 2024. He was joined by CBCP President Bishop Pablo Virgilio David, and CBCP Vice President Bishop Mylo Hubert Vergara. Other Filipinos present at the Synod on Synodality were Cardinal Luis Antonio Tagle, by virtue of his office as Pro-Prefect of the Dicastery for Evangelization; and Estela Padilla, a Filipino lay theologian nominated by Pope Francis to join the Synod.

Advincula participated as a cardinal elector in the 2025 conclave that elected Pope Leo XIV. He was one of the three cardinal electors from the Philippines, alongside Luis Antonio Tagle and Pablo Virgilio David.

Advincula is the grand prior of the Philippines Lieutenancy of the Equestrian Order of the Holy Sepulchre of Jerusalem.

In April 2026, amidst the Philippine energy crisis, Advincula advocated the recycling of used cooking oil as a biodiesel alternative.

==== Political and civic involvement ====
Following the passage of the Absolute Divorce Bill in May 2024, Advincula viewed the bill as a challenge for the Catholic Church in its ministry on the importance of the sacrament of matrimony. He added that the law is "not a magic pill that can solve marital problems".

Events in the Philippines under President Bongbong Marcos forced Advincula to become involved in politics. He appealed for prayer, sobriety, humility, forgiveness, reconciliation and statesmanship amid the Marcos–Duterte feud resulting in the rising contentious politics.

In September 2025, in the wake of the flood control projects scandal, Advincula, in a pastoral letter, denounced corruption in the government as "one of the vilest scams in the history of our nation."

Following a series of violence in Philippine schools and the recent Ateneo de Zamboanga University shooting, Advincula urged schools, communities, and families to listen to the silent struggles of young people and called for safe spaces where they can seek help without the fear of being judged.

== Coat of arms ==
Coat of arms of Jose Advincula
Adopted May 23, 2021 Helm Cardinal's Galero; The shield is surmounted by an archbishop's galero or ecclesiastical hat of this rank with fifteen tassels for each side in Gules (red) that signifies the rank of a cardinal. Escutcheon From 2021: Parted per fess: First: Gules (red), a three-windowed tower or (gold) masoned sable (black) and ajouré azure (blue), a crescent argent (silver), Second: Azure, a sea lion sejant (upright) argent armed (claws) and langued (tongue) gules with a cross fitchee (pointed base) or; Impaled with a shield tierced per fess: First: Azure, a lily argent and vert (green), a carpenter's square or and argent, Second: Or, a chain of nine links sable, Third: Azure, a star vert and argent, a horse rampant argent upon a mountain proper vert and argent, a crescent or Motto Audiam "I will listen." The motto was taken from 1 Samuel 3:10, depicting the Lord calling Samuel for three times which on the third call Samuel responded "Speak Lord, your servant is listening." Then, the Lord uttered his revelation. Other elements Archbishop's Cross; The shield is also surmounted by an archbishop's cross of the Order of Preachers. The Dominican tradition is significant in Advincula's education and formation. Symbolism The lily is a symbol of the Blessed Virgin Mary. The carpenter's square is a symbol of Saint Joseph, who is his namesake in Spanish and his personal patron saint. The chain of nine links represents his surname Advincula which is derived from the Latin phrase ad vincula or in chains. The gold background represents virtue, which the might of the Christian brings glory to God. The mountain represents Mt. Paningraon in the town of Dumalag, Capiz, his birthplace and hometown. It is a mountain that shows strips of limestone formation and a raging horse which locals attribute to their town's titular patron, Saint Martin of Tours. The crescent symbolizes the Blessed Virgin Mary as the Immaculate Conception, the titular patroness of the Archdiocese of Capiz and St. Pius X Seminary in Roxas City, Capiz, where he finished his minor seminary formation and philosophical studies. The five-pointed star is a pre-eminent symbol for the virtue of faith and De La Salle University, Manila where he finished his master's degree in education. Previous versions as Cardinal and Archbishop of Capiz (November 2020 – June 2021) as Archbishop of Capiz (November 2011 – November 2020) as Bishop of San Carlos (July 2001 – November 2011)

== Notes ==
Catholic Church titles
Preceded by Nicolas M. Mondejar	Bishop of San Carlos; 11 September 2001 – 9 November 2011	Succeeded by Salvador Trane Modesto
Preceded by Onesimo Cadiz Gordoncillo	Archbishop of Capiz; 11 January 2012 – 25 March 2021	Succeeded by Victor Barnuevo Bendico
New title	Cardinal Priest of San Vigilio; 28 November 2020 – present	Incumbent
Preceded by Luis Antonio Tagle	Archbishop of Manila; 24 June 2021 – present	Incumbent
