= Diocese of Kalibo =

Latin Catholic diocese in the Philippines

Diocese of Kalibo Dioecesis Kalibensis Diyosesis it Kalibo Diyosesis ng Kalibo

Catholic
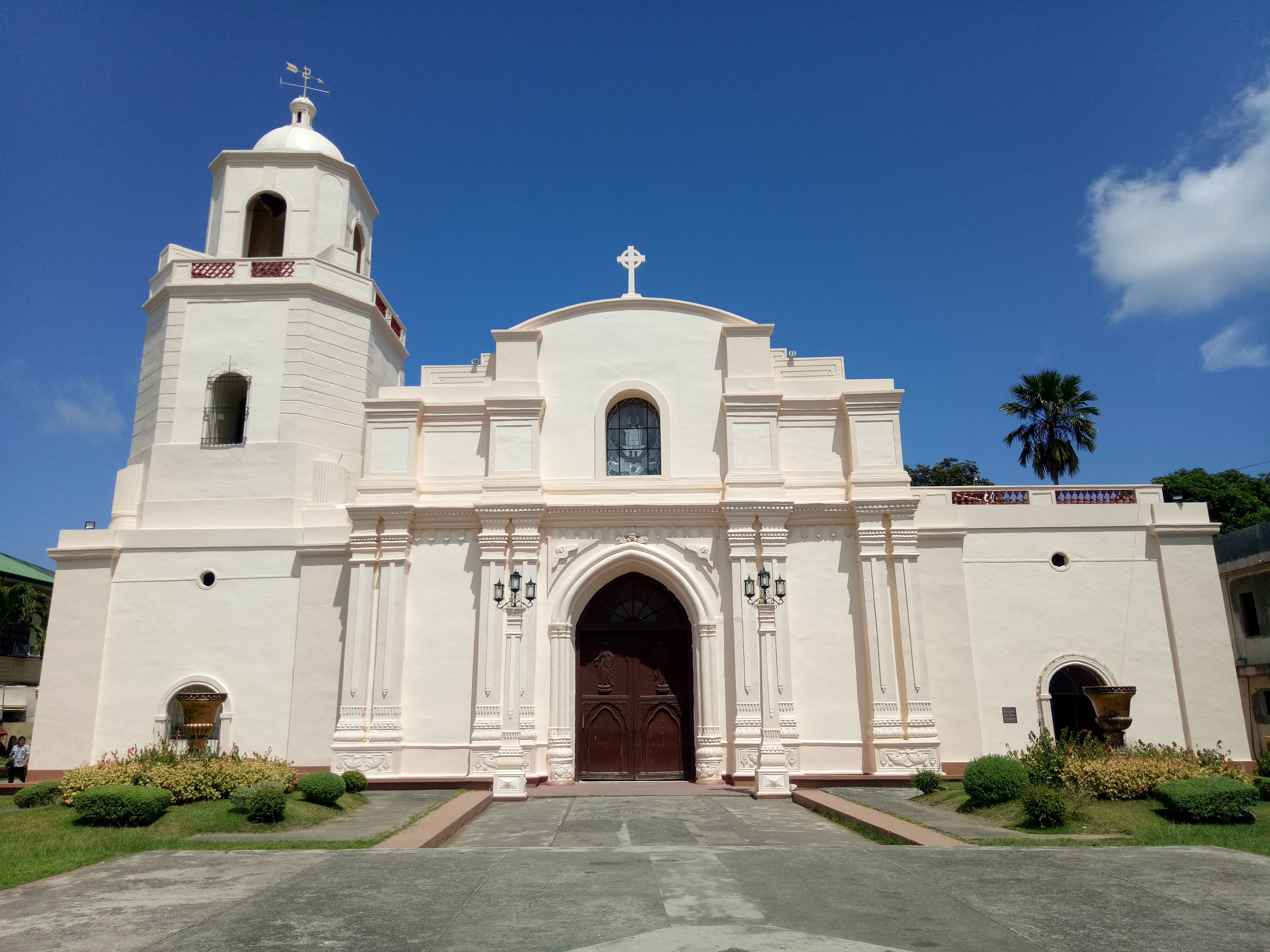
- Kalibo Cathedral

- Coat of arms

Location
- Country: Philippines
- Territory: Aklan
- Ecclesiastical province: Capiz
- Metropolitan: Capiz
- Coordinates: 11°40′N 122°20′E

Statistics
- Area: 2,019 km^{2} (780 sq mi)
- Population: Total; Catholics: (as of 2021); 900,000; 672,000 (74.7%)
- Parishes: 24
- Schools: 3

Information
- Denomination: Catholic Church
- Sui iuris church: Latin Church
- Rite: Roman Rite
- Established: January 17, 1976; 50 years ago
- Cathedral: Cathedral of Saint John the Baptist in Kalibo, Aklan
- Patron saint: Saint John the Baptist; St. Niño, Our Lady of The Most Holy Rosary
- Secular priests: 75

Current leadership
- Pope: Leo XIV
- Bishop: Cyril Buhayan Villareal
- Metropolitan Archbishop: Victor Barnuevo Bendico
- Vicar General: Frederick Malacas
- Bishops emeritus: Jose Corazon T. Tala-oc

The Diocese of Kalibo is a diocese of the Latin Church of the Catholic Church in the Philippines.

Erected in 1976, the diocese has experienced no jurisdictional changes and is a suffragan of the Archdiocese of Capiz.

The Diocese of Kalibo was created on January 17, 1976, and erected on July 15, 1976, a suffragan of the Archdiocese of Capiz. The first bishop was Juan N. Nilmar. The second bishop was Gabriel V. Reyes, installed on January 12, 1993. The third bishop was Jose Romeo O. Lazo, and the fourth bishop was Jose Corazon T. Tala- oc. The diocese comprises the civil province of Aklan, which was separated politically from the province of Capiz in 1956.

== Ordinaries ==
Bishop		Period in office	Coat of arms
1.	+Juan Nicolasora Nilmar	June 3, 1976 – November 21, 1992 (16 years, 171 days)	
2.	Gabriel Villaruz Reyes	November 21, 1992 – 7 December 27, 2002 (10 years, 36 days)	
3.	Jose Romeo Orquejo Lazo	November 15, 2003 – July 21, 2009 (5 years, 248 days)	
4.	Jose Corazon Tumbagahan Tala-oc	July 20, 2011 – June 16, 2025 (13 years, 331 days)	
5.	Cyril Buhayan Villareal	April 23, 2026 – present (97 days)	

== See also ==
- Catholic Church in the Philippines
