= Archdiocese of Capiz =

Roman Catholic archdiocese in the Philippines

Archdiocese of Capiz Archidioecesis Capicensis Artsidiyosesis sang Capiz Arkidiyosesis ng Capiz Arquidiocesis de Cápiz

Catholic
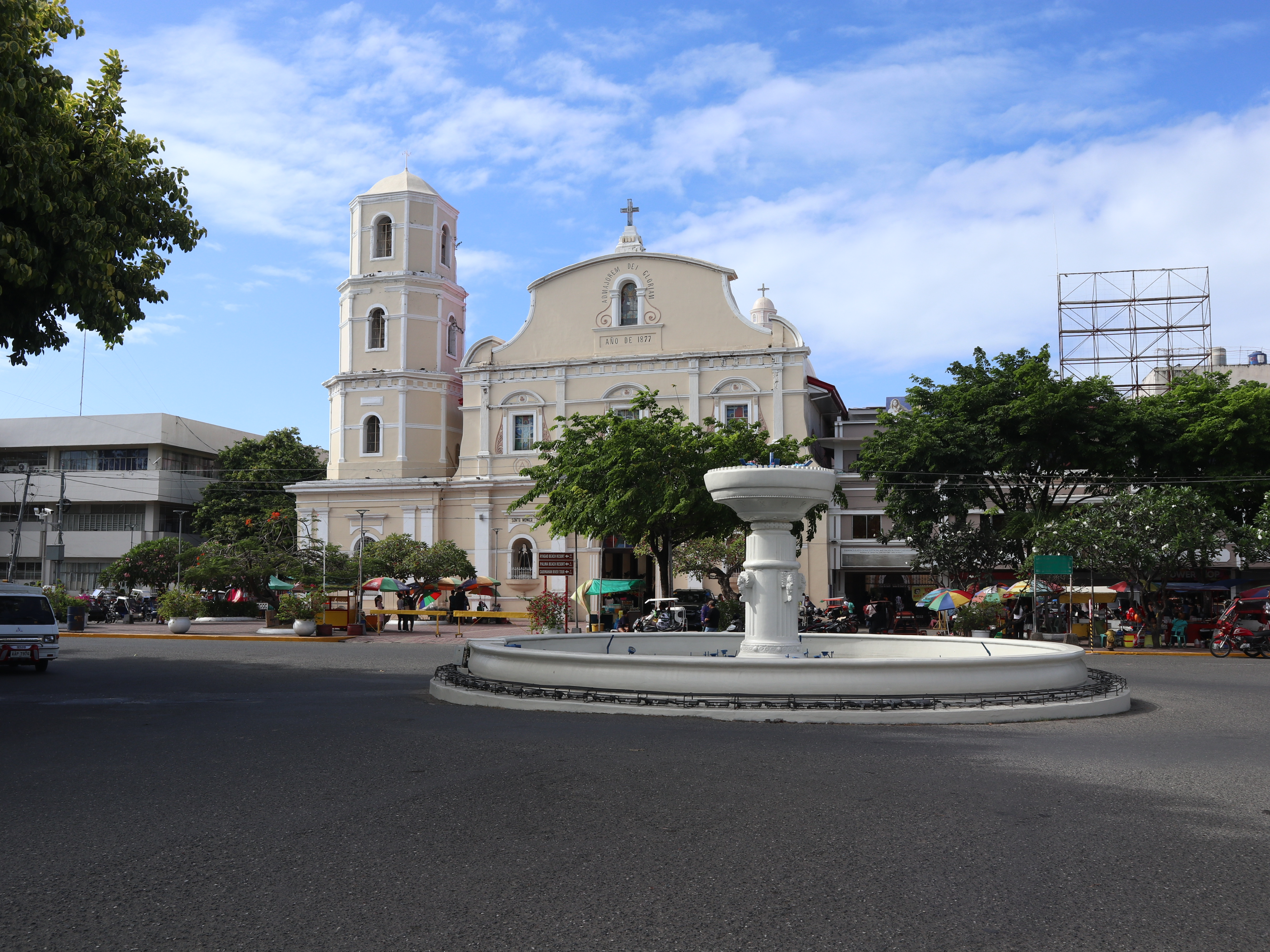
- Immaculate Concepcion Metropolitan Cathedral, Roxas City

- Coat of arms

Location
- Country: Philippines
- Territory: Capiz
- Ecclesiastical province: Capiz
- Metropolitan: Capiz
- Coordinates: 11.5836°N 122.7530°E

Statistics
- Area: 2,663 km^{2} (1,028 sq mi)
- Population: Total; Catholics: (as of 2021); 908,000; 823,825 (90.7%)
- Parishes: 37

Information
- Denomination: Catholic
- Sui iuris church: Latin Church
- Rite: Roman Rite
- Established: 11 July 1951 (Diocese); 17 January 1976 (Archdiocese)
- Cathedral: Immaculate Conception Metropolitan Cathedral
- Patroness: Immaculate Conception
- Secular priests: 113

Current leadership
- Pope: Leo XIV
- Metropolitan Archbishop: Victor Bendico
- Suffragans: Cyril Villareal (Kalibo) Narciso Abellana (Romblon)
- Vicar General: Rufino Regie Pamposa
- Episcopal Vicars: Berman Ibañez Cylvin Gloria Freddie Billanes Joseph Bernie Barrios
- Bishops emeritus: Jose Advincula (2011–2021)

Map
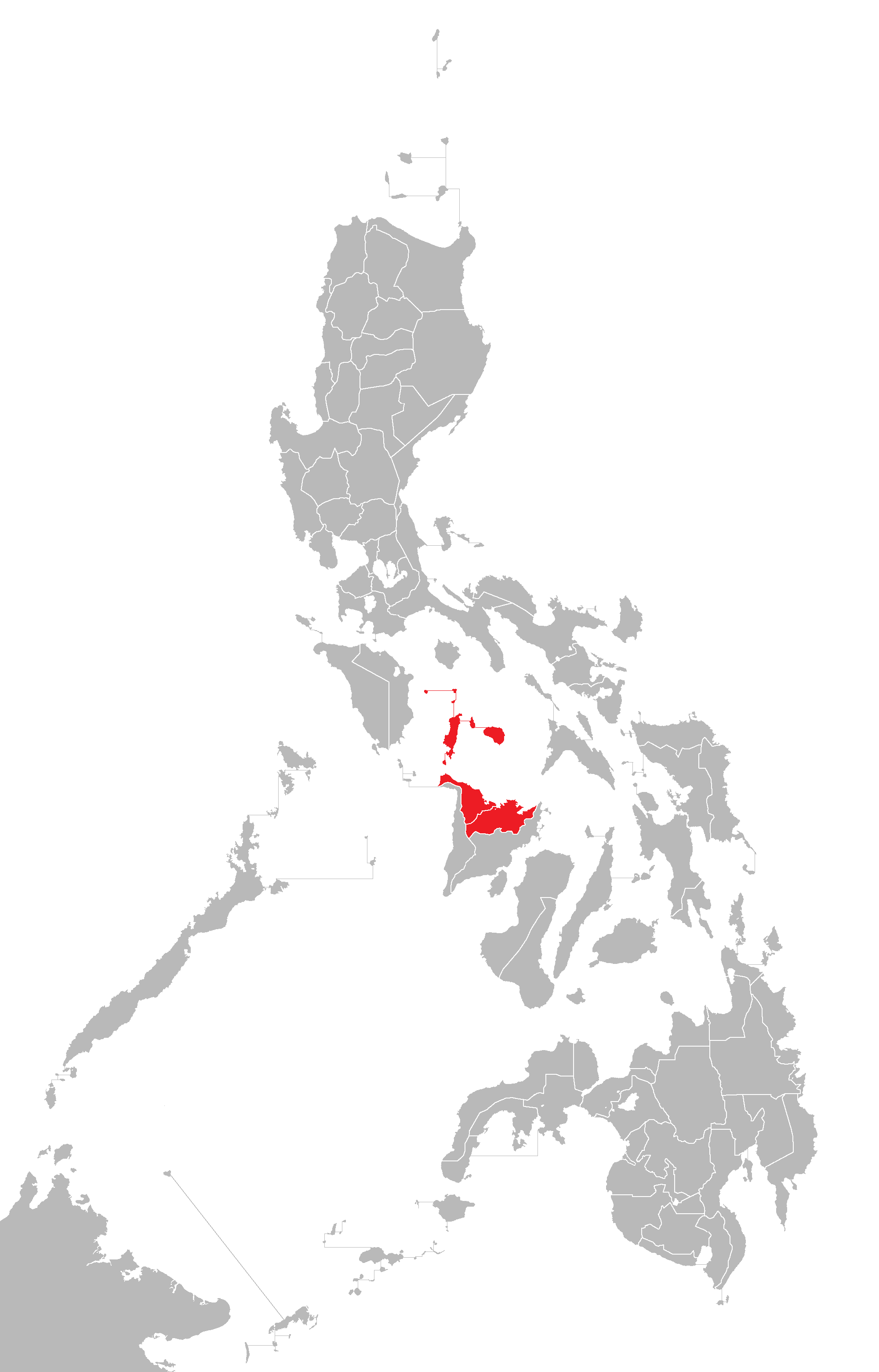
- Jurisdiction of the metropolitan see within the Philippines

The Archdiocese of Capiz is a Latin Church metropolitan archdiocese the Catholic Church in the Philippines. The archdiocese covers the entire province of Capiz on the island of Panay in the Visayas, central Philippines, and has its see in Roxas City. As an ecclesiastical province, it also encompasses the suffragan sees of Kalibo, which oversees the province of Aklan, and Romblon, which oversees the province of the same name. Its current archbishop is Victor Barnuevo Bendico, who was installed on May 3, 2023.

== History ==
The tumultuous situation that the Philippine Catholic church had experienced in the aftermath of the Philippine Revolution and the American occupation prompted the Holy See to issue the Apostolic Constitution Quæ Mari Sinico in 1902. This document, apart from encouraging the gradual transition of ecclesiastical leadership to the Filipino secular clergy, also proposed the formation of new dioceses in Lipa, Zamboanga, Tuguegarao, and Capiz. However, as Quae Mari Sinico does not have a consistorial decree on the proposed new dioceses, they remained in the jurisdiction of their mother dioceses; in the case of Capiz, it remained under the Archdiocese of Jaro.

Decades after Quæ Mari Sinico, the Diocese of Capiz was eventually formed on 27 January 1951 by virtue of the Apostolic Constitution Ex supremi apostolatus. The new diocese was carved from the territory of the Archdiocese of Jaro, and covered the whole civil provinces of Capiz (which included Aklan until 1956) and Romblon.

Two dioceses were eventually created from its territory: the Diocese of Romblon (19 December 1974) and the Diocese of Kalibo (17 January 1976).

On 17 January 1976, Pope Paul VI elevated the bishopric to the rank of an archdiocese through his Papal Bull Nimium Patens which turned it into an ecclesiastical province. The dioceses of Romblon and Kalibo became its suffragans.

The archdiocese retained the name Capiz since its establishment predates the renaming of the municipality where it sits into Roxas City (11 April 1951).

== Coat of arms ==
The silver crescent on the blue background symbolizes the Immaculate Conception, titular of the cathedral. The twins (kapid in Visayan) suggest the name of the territory of the diocese, the province of Capiz. The gold background indicates the unique honor accruing to the province from the fact that the highest men in Church and State at the time when the Philippines became a republic were both from Capiz: the Gabriel M. Reyes, then-archbishop of Manila and Manuel Roxas, the first president of the Third Philippine Republic. Hence, the twin at the dexter side holds a patriarchal cross, insignia of an archbishop, while the one at the sinister side holds a sheathed ancient ceremonial sword of command.

== List of ordinaries ==
=== Bishops ===
Name		Period in office		Coat of arms
Name		From	Until	Coat of arms
1.	Manuel Porcia Yap†	February 13, 1951	March 5, 1952 (appointment; bishop of Bacolod)	
2.	Antonio Floro Frondosa†	March 5, 1952	January 17, 1976 (appointment; archbishop)	

=== Archbishops ===
Name		Period in office		Coat of arms
Name		From	Until	Coat of arms
1.	Antonio Floro Frondosa	January 17, 1976 (appointment; former bishop)	June 18, 1986 (retirement)	
2.	Onesimo Cadiz Gordoncillo	June 18, 1986 (appointment; former bishop of Tagbilaran)	November 9, 2011	
3.	Jose Fuerte Advincula, O.P.	November 9, 2011 (appointment; former bishop of San Carlos)	June 24, 2021 (appointment; archbishop of Manila)	
4.	Victor Barnuevo Bendico	May 3, 2023 (appointment; former bishop of Baguio)	Incumbent	

=== Auxiliary bishops ===
Name			Period in office		Coat of arms
Name			From	Until	Coat of arms
1.	Vicente Macanan Navarra	April 23, 1979	November 21, 1987 (appointment; bishop of Kabankalan)		

== Affiliated bishops ==
- Jaime Sin, first rector of St. Pius X Seminary (1957–1967); archbishop of Jaro (1972–1974); archbishop of Manila (1974–2003)
- Warlito I. Cajandig, appointed apostolic vicar of Calapan in 1989
- Vicente Navarra, first bishop of Kabankalan (1987–2001); bishop of Bacolod (2001–2016)
- Victor B. Bendico, appointed bishop of Baguio (2017–2023); appointed archbishop of Capiz in 2023
- Jose Advincula, bishop of San Carlos (2001–2011); archbishop of Capiz (2011–2021); appointed archbishop of Manila in 2021
- Cyril Villareal, appointed bishop of Kalibo in 2026

== Suffragan dioceses and bishops ==
Diocese	Bishop	Period in office	Coat of arms
Romblon (Romblon)	Narciso V. Abellana	January 9, 2014 – present (12 years, 221 days)	
Kalibo (Aklan)	Cyril B. Villareal	April 23, 2026 – present (117 days)	

== Administered schools ==
- St. Pius X Seminary (Roxas City)
- Sancta Maria, Mater et Regina, Seminarium (Roxas City)
- Colegio De La Purisima Concepcion

== Gallery ==
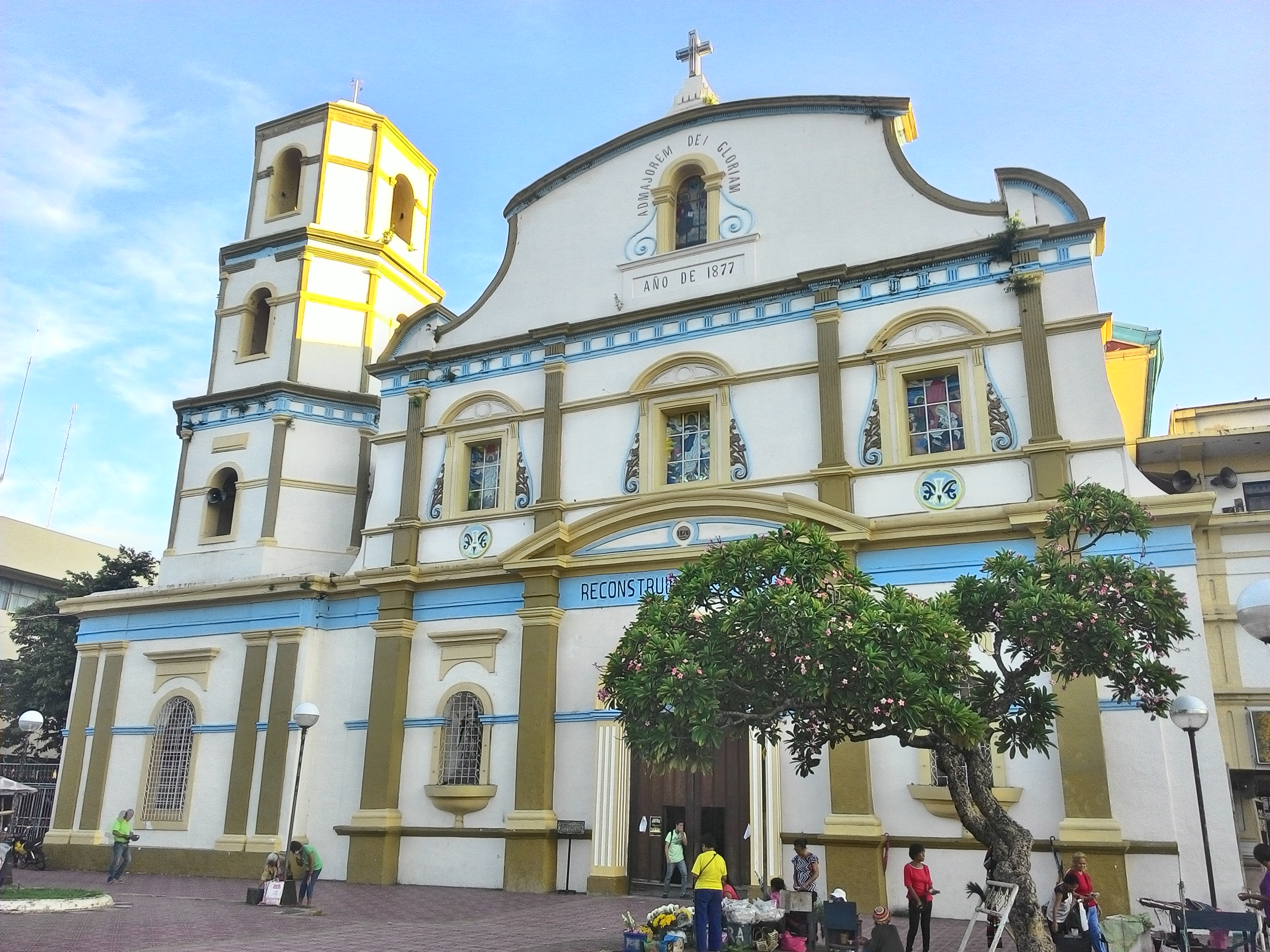
Immaculate Conception Metropolitan Cathedral, Roxas City

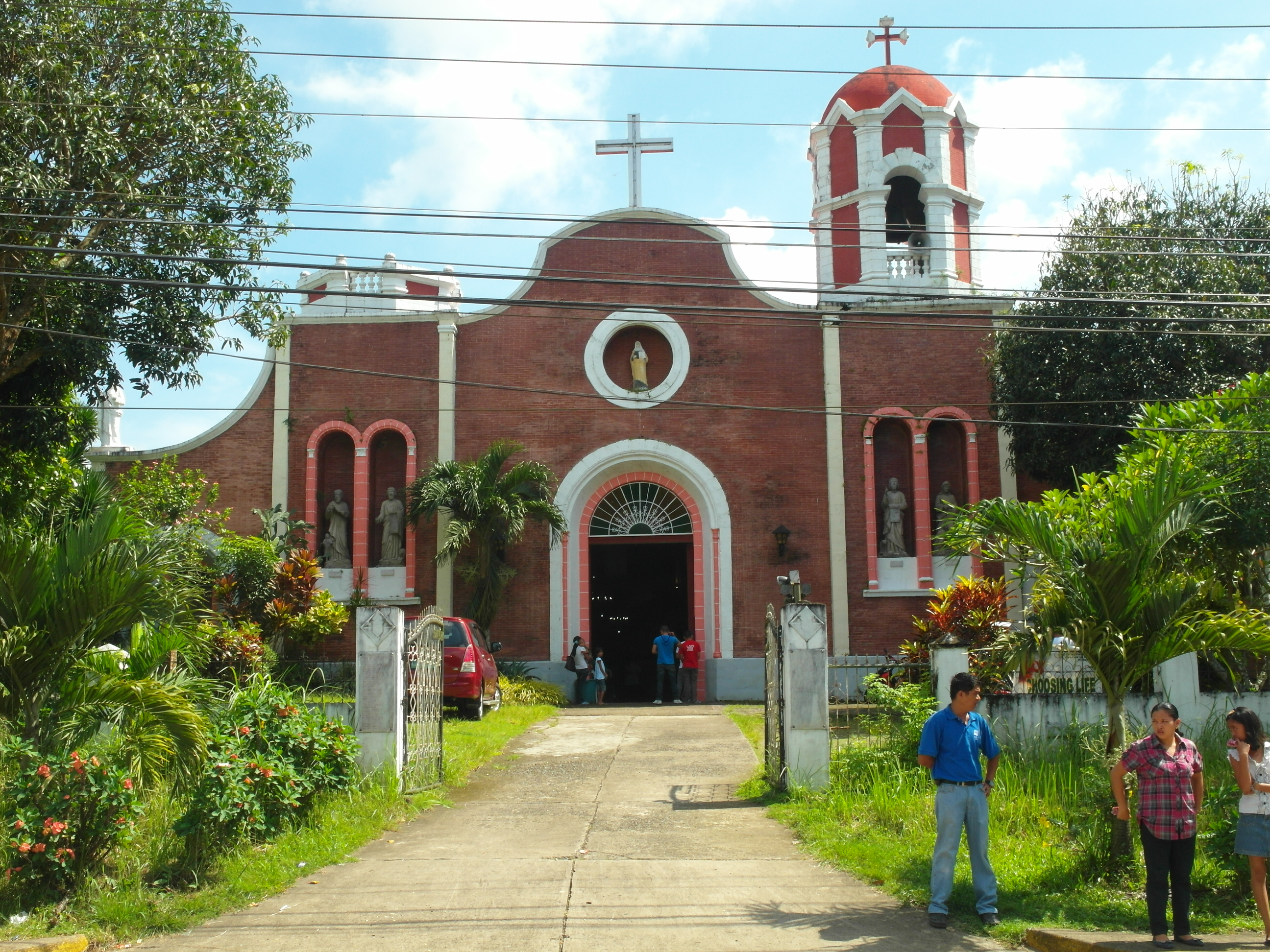
Saint Therese of Avila Parish Church, Roxas City

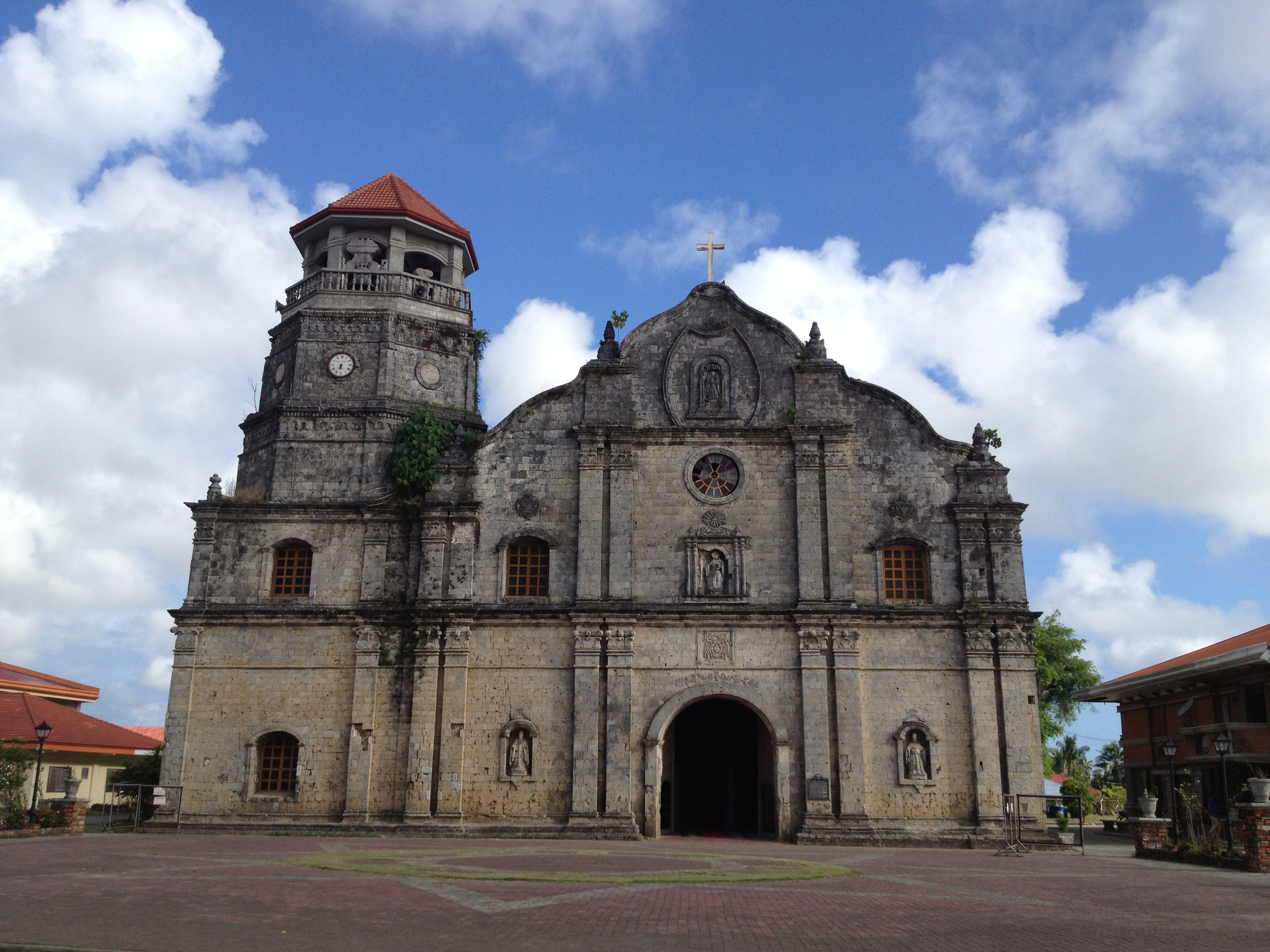
Santa Monica Parish Church, Panay

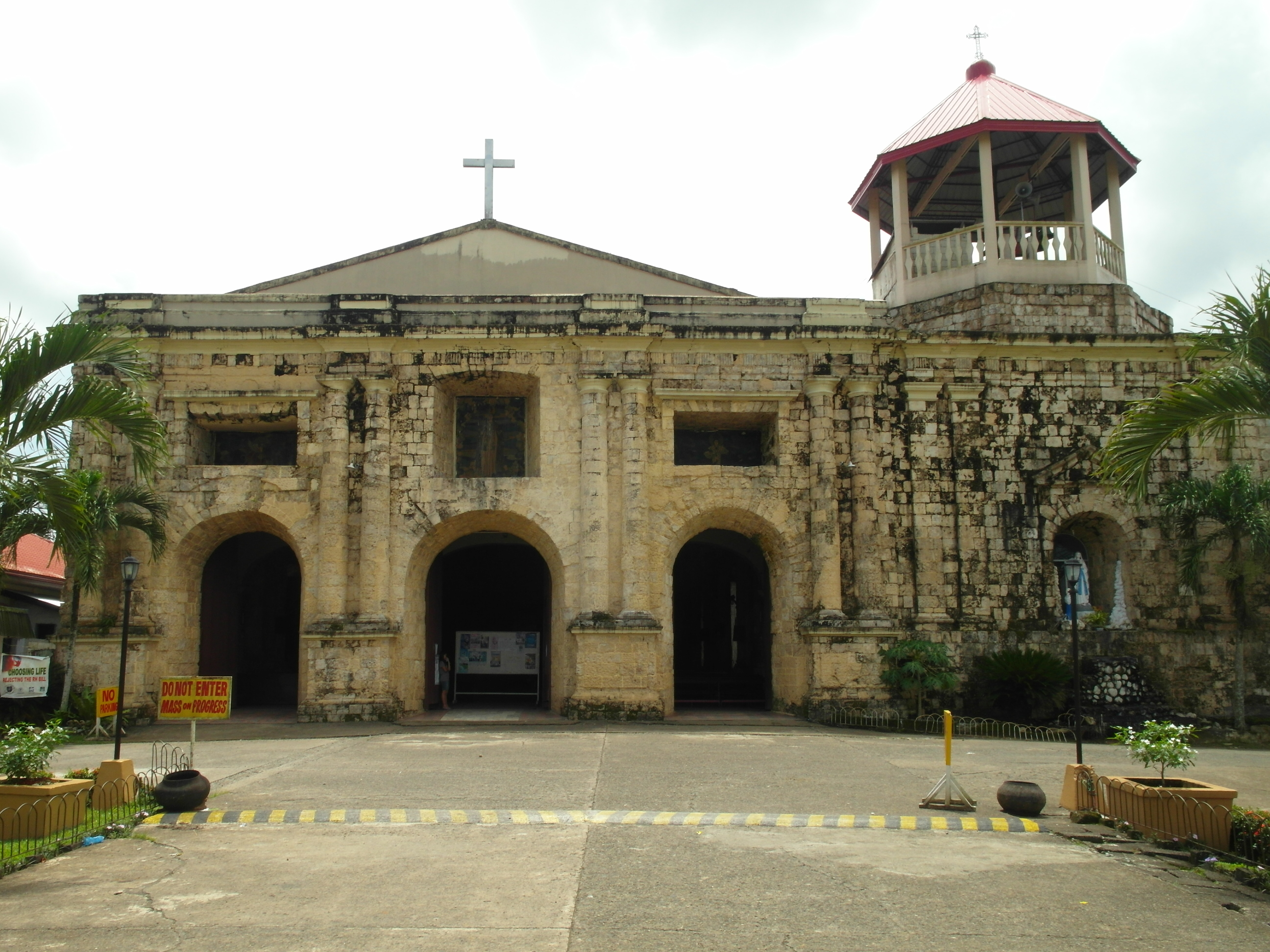
St. Thomas of Villanova Parish Church, Dao

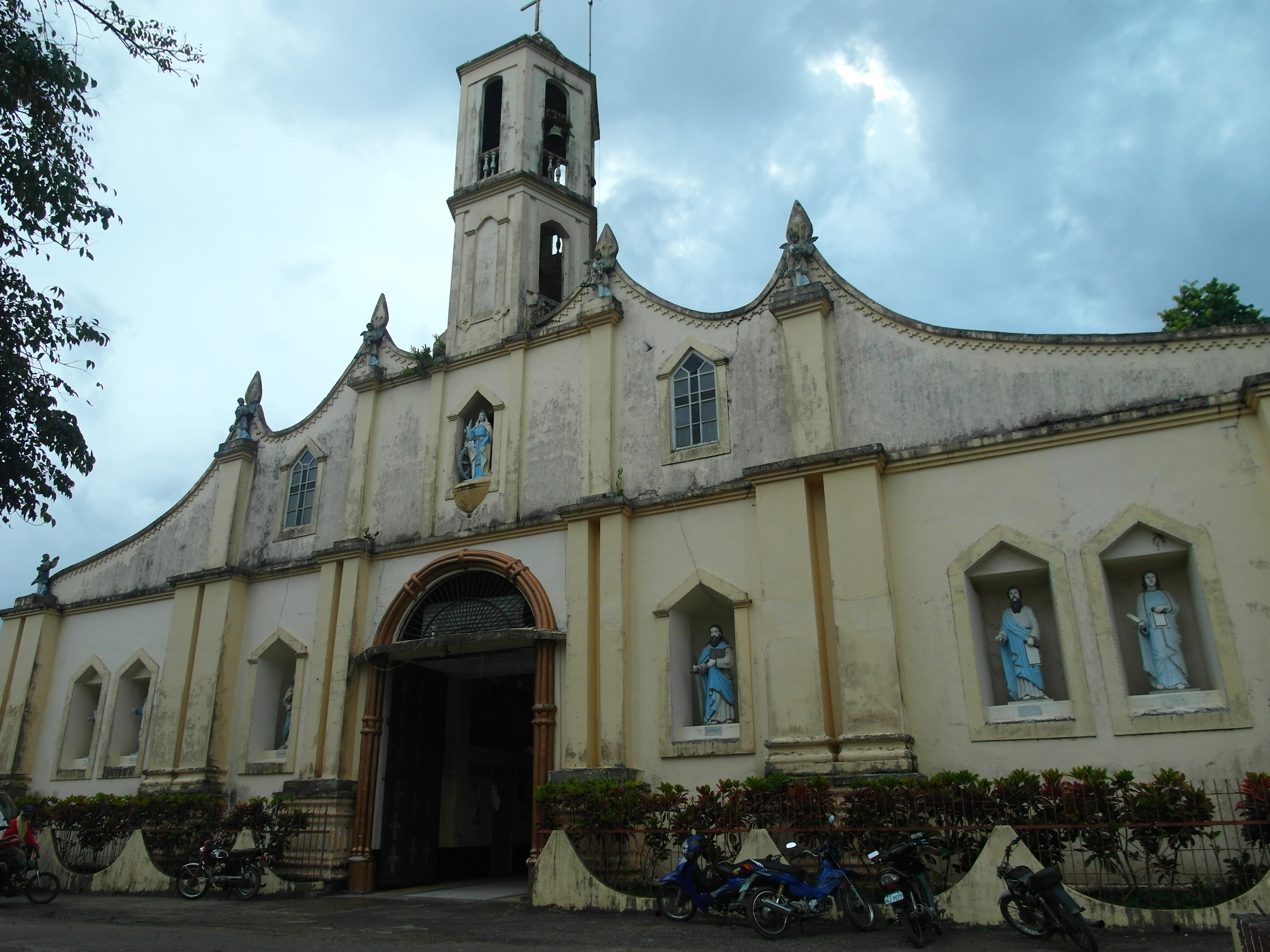
Saint Catherine of Alexandria Parish Church, Mambusao

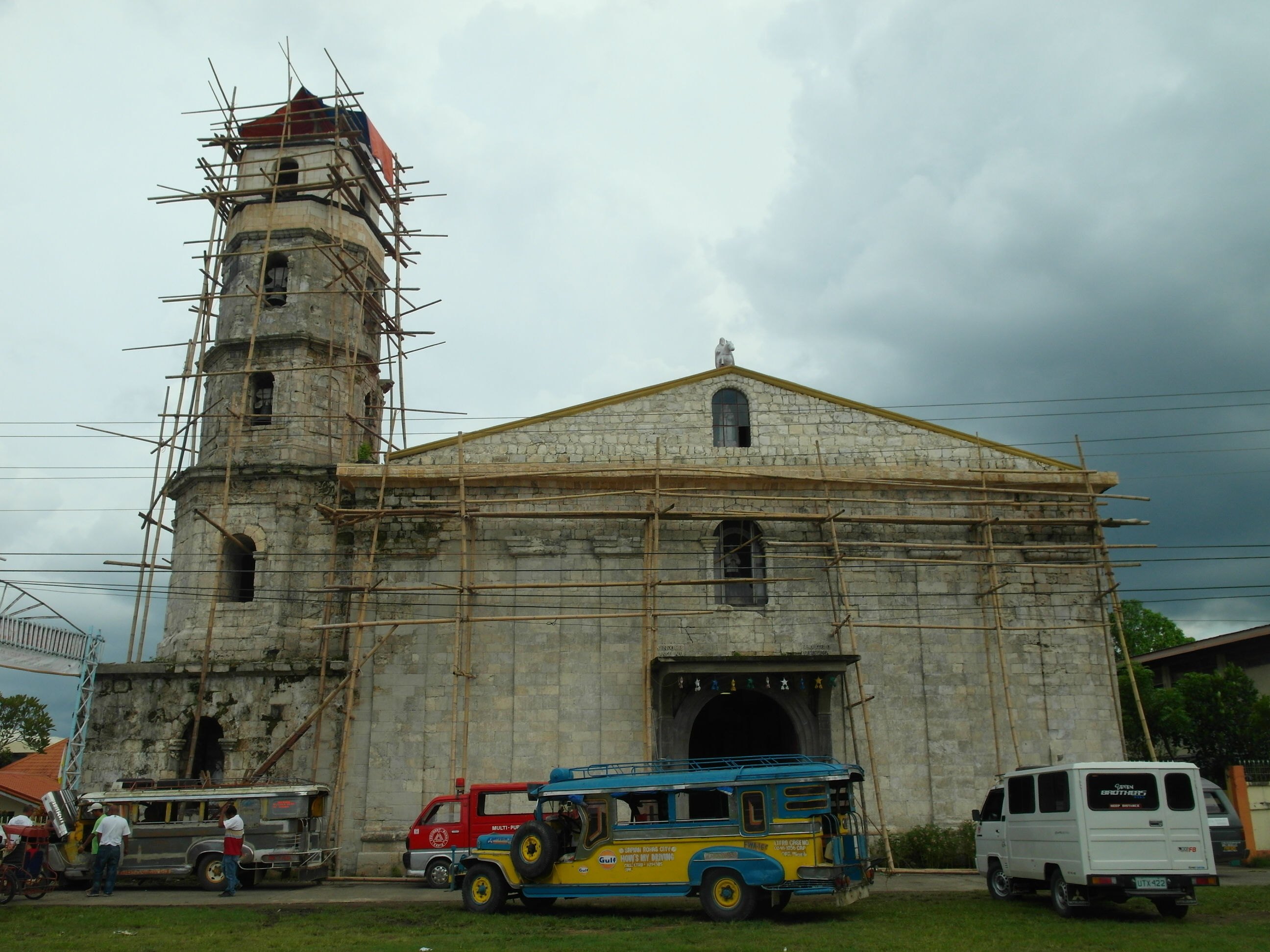
St. Martin of Tours Parish Church, Dumalag

== See also ==
- Christianity in the Philippines
- List of Catholic dioceses in the Philippines
- Panay Church
