= Onesimo Cadiz Gordoncillo =

Filipino Roman Catholic archbishop

- Archbishop of Capiz
- Church: Catholic Church
- Archdiocese: Archdiocese of Capiz
- In office: 18 June 1986 – 9 November 2011
- Predecessor: Antonio Floro Frondosa
- Successor: Jose Advincula
- Previous posts: Bishop of Tagbilaran (1976-1986); Titular Bishop of Gunugus (1974-1976); Auxiliary Bishop of Dumaguete (1974-1976)

Orders
- Ordination: 18 March 1961
- Consecration: 27 May 1974 by Bruno Torpigliani

Personal details
- Born: 16 February 1935 Jimalalud, Negros Oriental, Philippine Islands, United States
- Died: 13 November 2013 (aged 78)
- Motto: Veritatem Tuam Annuntiabo
- Coat of arms

Onesimo Cadiz Gordoncillo (16 February 1935 − 13 November 2013) was a Filipino Roman Catholic archbishop.

Born in Jimalalud, Negros Oriental, in 1935 and ordained to the priesthood in 1961, he was named auxiliary bishop of the Roman Catholic Diocese of Dumaguete, Philippines in 1974. Gordoncillo was then named bishop of the Roman Catholic Diocese of Tagbilaran in 1976 and then Archbishop of the Archdiocese of Capiz in 1986 and retired in 2011.
