= Victor Bendico =

20th and 21st-century Roman Catholic Archbishop

The Most Reverend,His Excellency Victor Bendico D.D.
- Metropolitan Archbishop of Capiz
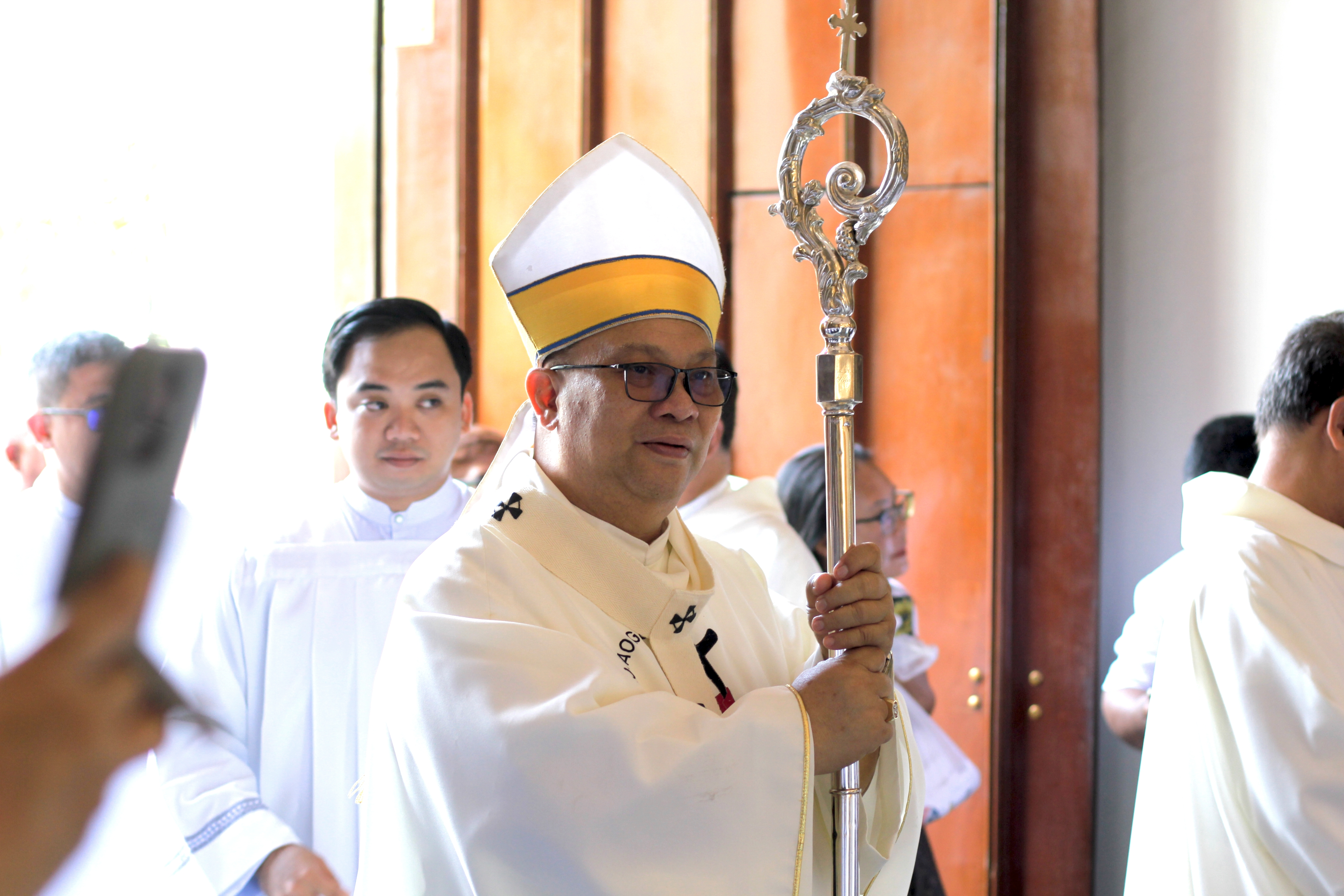
- Church: Roman Catholic Church
- Archdiocese: Capiz
- Province: Capiz
- See: Capiz
- Appointed: March 3, 2023
- Installed: May 3, 2023
- Predecessor: Cardinal Jose Advincula
- Previous posts: Bishop of Baguio (2016–2023); Apostolic Administrator of San Fernando de La Union (2017–2018); Apostolic Administrator of Kalibo (2025–2026)

Orders
- Ordination: April 14, 1984 by Antonio Floro Frondosa
- Consecration: January 10, 2017 by Marlo Peralta

Personal details
- Born: Victor Barnuevo Bendico; January 22, 1960 (age 66) Roxas City, Capiz, Philippines
- Denomination: Roman Catholic
- Residence: Archbishop's Residence, Lawaan, Roxas City
- Education: Pontifical Institute of St. Anselm
- Motto: Confidam (Latin for 'I will trust')
- Coat of arms: Victor Bendico's coat of arms

Ordination history
History
Priestly ordination
- Ordained by: Antonio Floro Frondosa
Episcopal consecration
- Principal consecrator: Marlo Peralta
- Co-consecrators: Carlito Joaquin Cenzon; Jose Advincula
Episcopal succession
Bishops consecrated by Victor Bendico as principal consecrator
- Cyril Villareal: April 23, 2026
- Styles
- Reference style: The Most Reverend
- Spoken style: Your Excellency
- Religious style: Archbishop

Victor Barnuevo Bendico (born January 22, 1960) often referred to as Bishop Vic or Monsignor Vic, is a Filipino prelate of the Catholic Church who has been appointed the fourth Metropolitan Archbishop of Capiz.

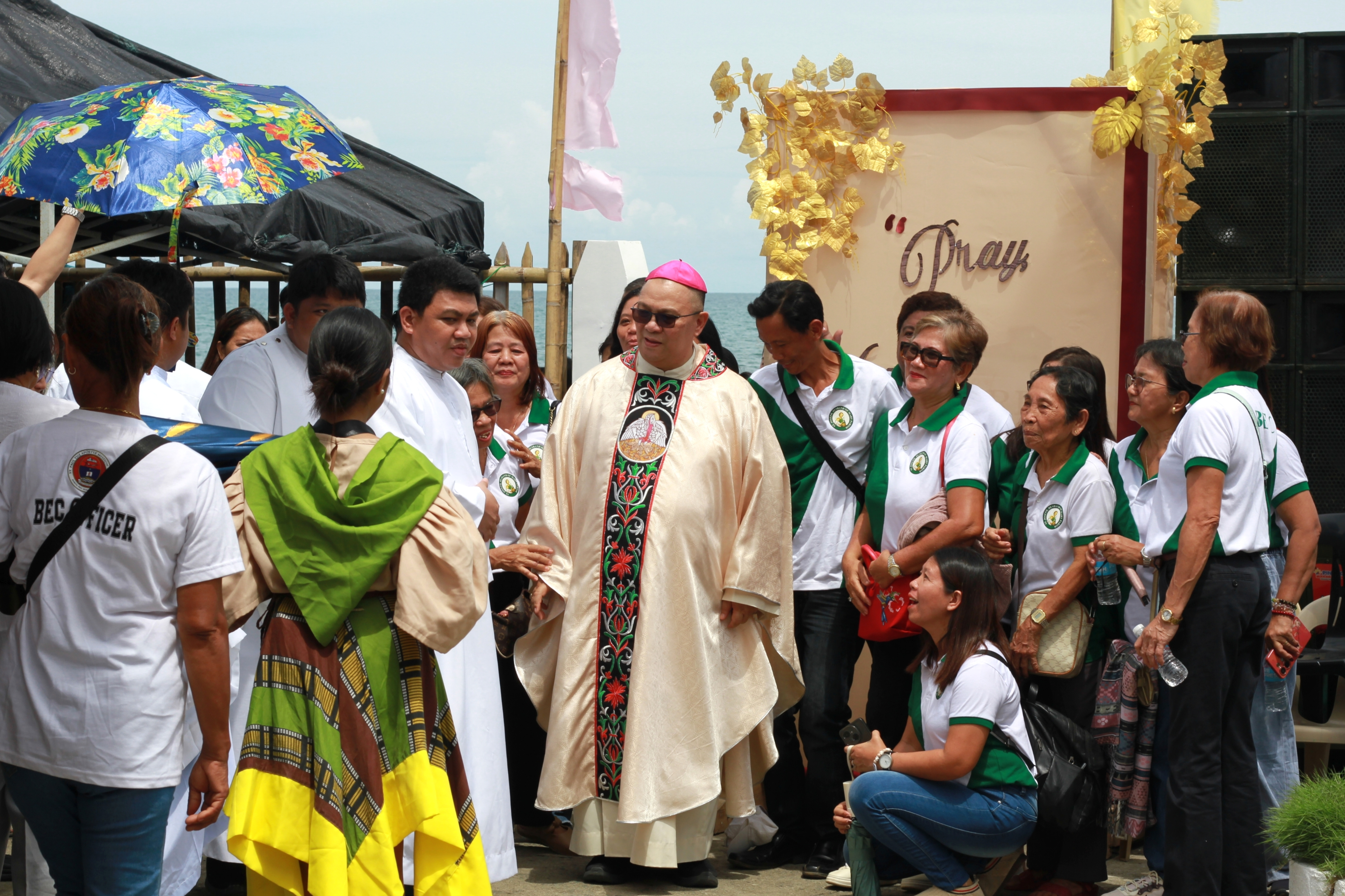
Archbishop Bendico during the Season of Creation mass in Roxas City, Capiz last October 2, 2025

Within the Catholic Bishops' Conference of the Philippines, he chairs the Episcopal Commission for Permanent Diaconate.

== Biography ==
Victor Bendico was born on January 22, 1960, in Roxas City, Capiz. He studied philosophy and theology at the University of Santo Tomas Central Seminary, before pursuing his doctorate in sacred liturgy at the Pontifical Institute of Saint Anselm. He was ordained to the priesthood on April 14, 1984.

On October 1, 2016, Pope Francis appointed him as the second Bishop of Baguio, replacing the retiring bishop Carlito Joaquin Cenzon. The Archbishop of Nueva Segovia, Marlo Peralta, consecrated Bendico to the episcopate on January 10, 2017, at the Baguio Cathedral. He was installed at his post on the same day.

From 2017 to 2018, he served as apostolic administrator of the Diocese of San Fernando de La Union.

On March 3, 2023, Pope Francis appointed him as the fourth Archbishop of Capiz, replacing Cardinal Jose Advincula who had been the current Archbishop of Manila since 2021. He took possession of the archdiocese exactly two months later; he was installed by the Apostolic Nuncio to the Philippines, Archbishop Charles John Brown. He received the pallium, a symbol of his authority as metropolitan archbishop, on August 18, 2023.

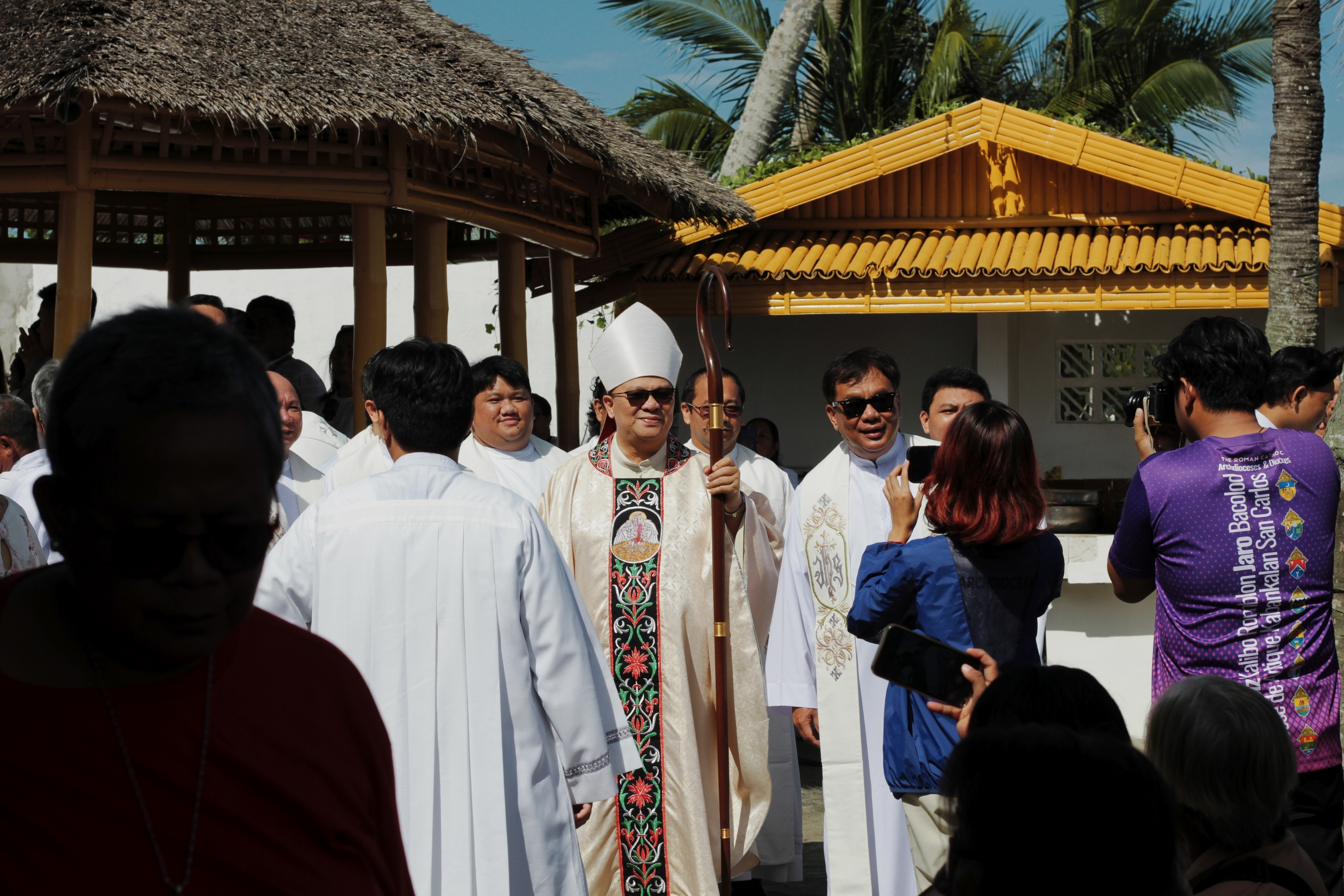
The Most Rev. Victor B. Bendico D.D. with Msgr. Rufino Reggie A. Pamposa, P.C. last October 2, 2025

On June 16, 2025, Pope Leo XIV appointed him Apostolic Administrator of the Diocese of Kalibo, following the retirement of its bishop, Jose Corazon Tala-oc.

Catholic Church titles
Preceded by Carlito Joaquin Cenzon	Bishop of Baguio; January 10, 2017 – March 3, 2023	Succeeded by Rafael T. Cruz
Preceded by Jose Advincula	Archbishop of Capiz; May 3, 2023 – present	Incumbent
