= Alberto Jover Piamonte =

Roman Catholic archbishop

The Most Reverend Alberto Jover Piamonte D.D., J.C.D.
- Archbishop of Jaro
- Archdiocese: Jaro
- Province: Jaro
- Metropolis: Jaro
- Appointed: 4 April 1986
- Term ended: 17 December 1998
- Predecessor: Artemio G. Casas
- Successor: Angel Lagdameo
- Other posts: Titular Bishop of Gubaliana; Auxiliary Bishop of Jaro (28 December 1974 - 4 April 1986)

Orders
- Ordination: 22 March 1958 by Jose Maria Cuenco
- Consecration: 2 February 1975 by Bruno Torpigliani

Personal details
- Born: Alberto Jover Piamonte; 21 November 1934 Iloilo City, Philippine Islands
- Died: 17 December 1998 (aged 64) Iloilo City, Philippines
- Buried: Metropolitan Cathedral of Jaro
- Denomination: Roman Catholic
- Residence: Jaro, Iloilo City
- Education: St. Vincent Ferrer Seminary; Pontifical and Royal University of Santo Tomas; Pontifical University of Saint Thomas Aquinas
- Coat of arms

Styles of Alberto Jover Piamonte
- Reference style: The Most Reverend
- Spoken style: Your Excellency
- Religious style: Monsignor; Archbishop

Alberto Jover Piamonte, D.D., JCD., (21 November 1934 – 17 December 1998) was the fourth Roman Catholic Archbishop of Jaro in the Philippines. He was born in Iloilo City on 21 November 1934 and was a native of the District of Jaro, Iloilo City. After studying Philosophy and Theology at St. Vincent Ferrer Seminary, he was ordained a priest of the Archdiocese of Jaro on 22 March 1958.

He served the archdiocese for around 40 years. In 1960, two years after his ordination to the priesthood, he was appointed as Vice Chancellor of the archdiocese. Afterwards he was sent for further studies in Manila, where he earned his Licentiate in Canon Law from the University of Santo Tomas. He also pursued his doctorate in the same field at the Pontifical University of Saint Thomas Aquinas in Rome.

Staying in Italy after his terminal degree in Canon Law, Piamonte served at the Roman Rota, the ordinary court of appeal of the Vatican for cases on matters of ecclesiastical law appealed to the Holy See, notably cases involving the validity of marriage. He was the first Filipino auditor of the Roman Rota.

On 28 December 1974, Pope Paul VI appointed Mons. Alberto Piamonte as Titular Bishop of Gubaliana and Auxiliary Bishop of Jaro. He received his episcopal consecration from Archbishop Bruno Torpigliani, Papal Nuncio to the Philippines, with Archbishop Jaime Sin (the newly appointed archbishop of Manila that year) and Archbishop Artemio Cases, the 3rd Archbishop of Jaro.

Sacerdotal Ordination of Fr. Alberto Jover Piamonte (second from the right) in Jaro Cathedral, by His Excellency Mons. José María Cuenco, Metropolitan Archbishop of Jaro, 22 March 1958.

After Archbishop Casas resigned in 1986, Mons. Piamonte was installed as ordinary of the archdiocese on 16 July 1986.

At the time of his death, on 17 December 1998, Archbishop Piamonte was Chairman of the Commission on Canon Law of the Catholic Bishops' Conference of the Philippines (CBCP). He had been a member of the CBCP Administrative Council from 1977-1981 and a member of the CBCP Permanent Council from 1983-1987 and 1993-1996.

In 1997, Archbishop Piamonte led the Church's opposition in Iloilo against the plan of the government of former Philippine President Fidel V. Ramos, to amend the Constitution and to extend the term of Philippine President. Mons. Piamonte also led protests against a government-sanctioned lottery, and promoted protection of the environment through tree-planting and other activities.

Archbishop Piamonte was among the 13 Filipino Synod Fathers at the Special Assembly of the 1998 Synod of Bishops for Asia, held from April 19 - May 14 of that year, at the Vatican.

Catholic Church titles
Preceded by Angel Morta Figuls	Titular Bishop of Gubaliana; 28 December 1974 – 2 April 1986	Succeeded by Orlando Romero Cabrera
Preceded by Artemio G. Casas	Archbishop of Jaro; 4 April 1986 – 17 December 1998	Succeeded by Angel Lagdameo
