= St. Vincent Ferrer Seminary =

Catholic seminary in Iloilo City

Seminario de San Vicente Ferrer St. Vincent Ferrer Seminary
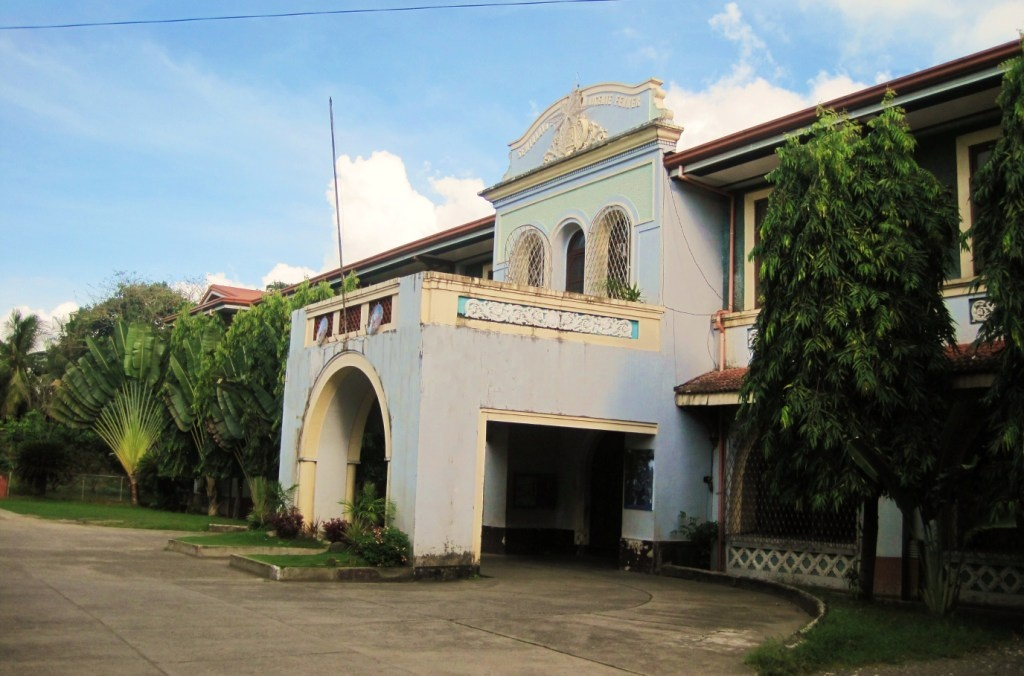
- St. Vincent Ferrer Seminary in Jaro, Iloilo City - the first Institution of higher learning in Western Visayas.
- Latin: Sancti Vincentii Ferrer Seminarium
- Former name: Seminario-Colegio de San Vicente Ferrer
- Motto: Humanum esse per scientiam et rationem ad fidem.
- Motto in English: Being human through knowledge and reason that leads to faith.
- Established: 1869
- Affiliations: Catholic, Archdiocese of Jaro
- Location: Jaro, Iloilo City, Iloilo, Philippines
- Campus: Urban
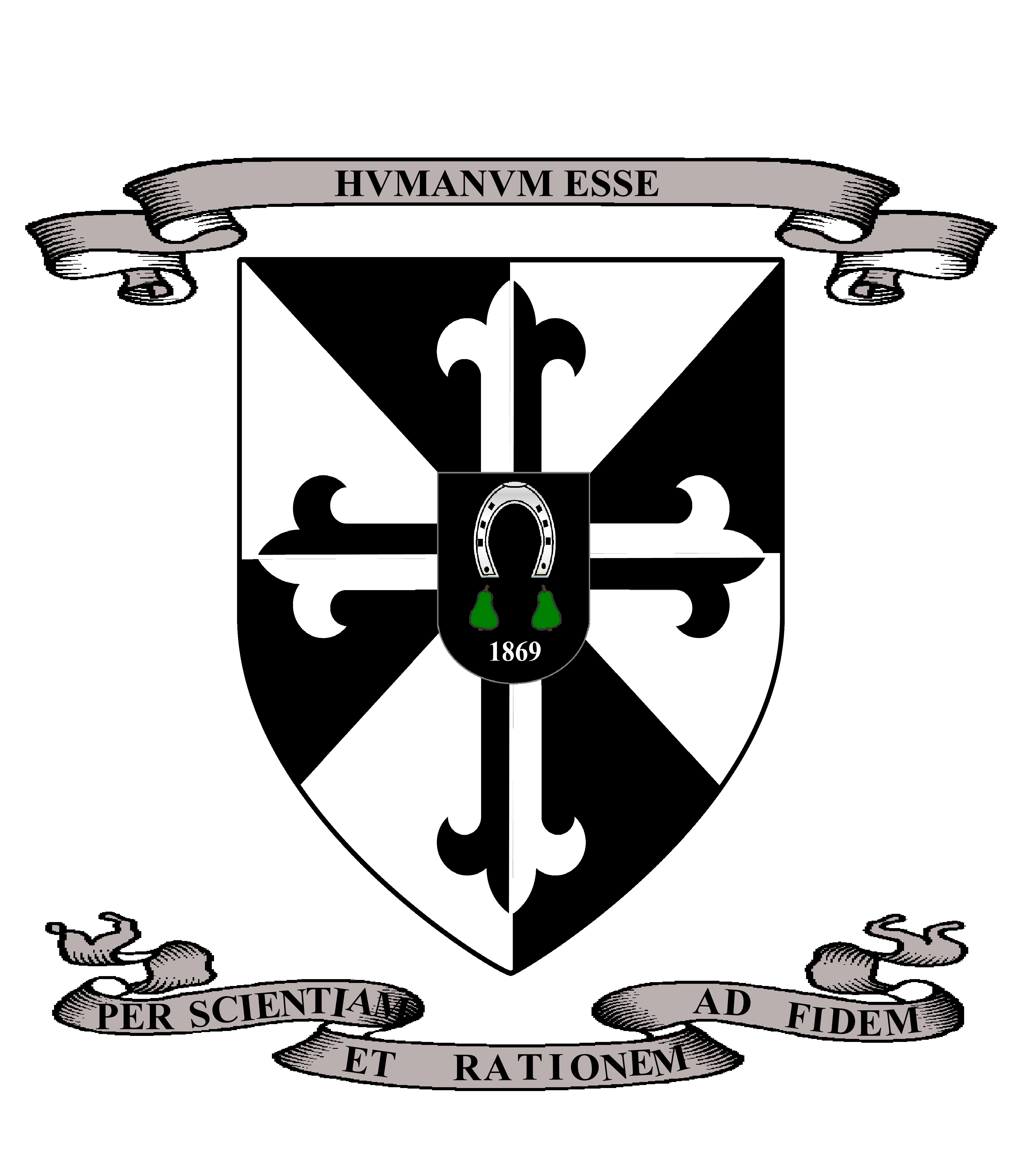

The Seminario de San Vicente Ferrer (Saint Vincent Ferrer Seminary), also known as San Vicente Ferrer, Seminario or Saint Vincent, is a college-seminary of the Archdiocese of Jaro located in Iloilo City. It was founded in 1869 and is the first institution of higher education in the Western Visayas. It is the fifth oldest and the last seminary that was established during the Spanish colonial period in the Philippines. The Seminarians serve the nearby Jaro Cathedral which houses the miraculous statue of Nuestra Señora de la Candelaria de Jaro, the official patron of Western Visayas.

== The beginning ==
On May 27, 1865, Pope Pius IX, in the bull of erection Qui Ab Initio of the Diocese of Jaro, insisted that a new bishop should be found and a seminary organized as soon as possible. The Archbishop of Manila, Gregorio Meliton Martinez carried the decree into effect, on October 10, 1867. At that time, Mariano Cuartero, the first Bishop of Jaro, was still in Spain, acting as General Procurator of the Dominican Order. He received episcopal ordination at the Dominican Seminary of Ocania, Spain, in November 1867, and was able to take possession of his diocese only on April 25, 1868. The new bishop founded the Diocesan Seminary where he could train good pastors for the different parishes, which at that time were almost entirely under the spiritual administration of the Augustinian friars, who were then regarded as the Fathers of the Faith in Panay.

On April 2, 1868, Cuartero arrived in Manila together with five Vincentian priests, three Brothers and sixteen Daughters of Charity. Having taken possession of the diocese, Cuartero immediately began his work of enlarging the parish of "La Candelaria" to be his cathedral church, the adaptation of the convent to be his residence and the foundation of the Diocesan Seminary in December 1869.

The Vicentian Fathers, upon the request of Cuartero, came to Jaro to organize and direct the Diocesan Seminary. The first Vincentian Fathers who took the direction of the Seminary of Jaro was made of three priests: Ildefonso Moral, rector, one of the greatest figures in the early history of the Vincentians in the Philippines; Aniceto Gonzales, who directed the construction of the seminary building and later, succeeded Moral as rector; and the newly ordained priest, Juan Miralda. Before the end of 1870, two young priests, Juan Jayme and Rufino Martin and a brother of Francisco Lopez joined the community. A year later Joaquin Jayme replaced his brother Juan who, was transferred to the Seminary of Cebu. At the death of Martin in 1873, Juan Jayme took over his work. Those were the founders of the Seminario Metropolitano de San Vicente Ferrer.

It is unknown who the first seminarians were because of the fire of 1906 which destroyed the seminary building and its records. It is known, however, that some of the first seminarians of Jaro had transferred to Cebu like the two "habitatis." They are so called because being students of Moral Theology, they already donned to the soutane. They were Basilio Albar and Silvestre Apura, who were ordained priests in Jaro in 1873 and 1874 respectively.

== First seminary building ==
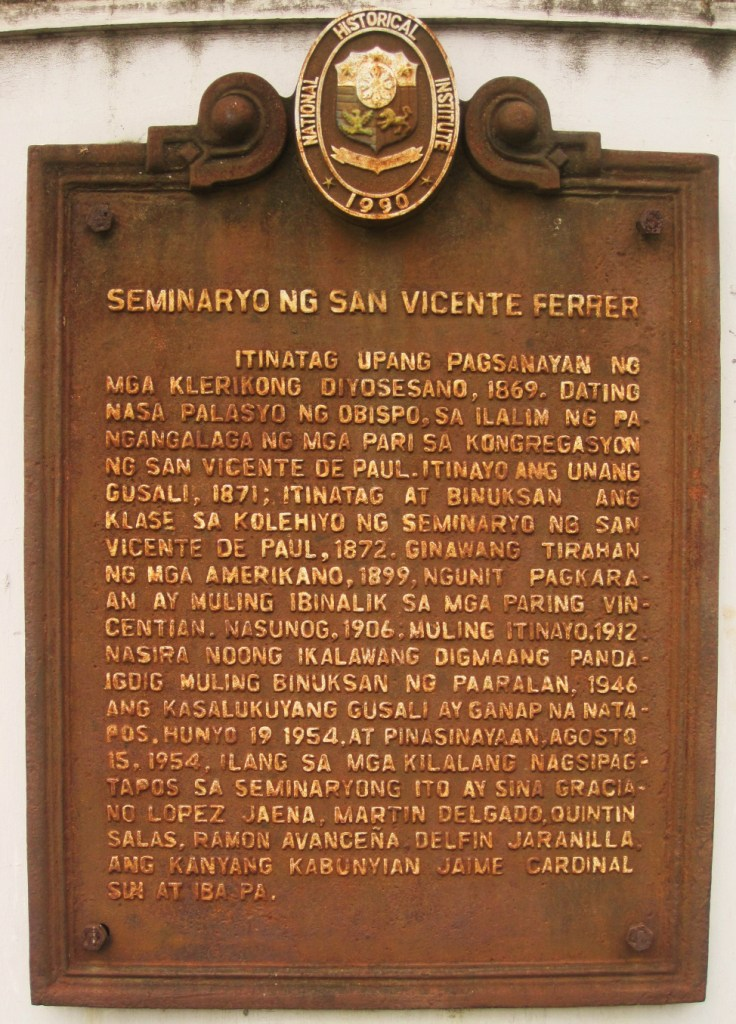
The 1990 iron marker placed by the National Historical Institute of the Republic of the Philippines on the main entrance of St. Vincent Ferrer Seminary in Jaro, Iloilo City, to officially and publicly proclaim the historical significance of the first Institution of Higher Learning in Western Visayas.

At first, the seminary was housed at the bishop's residence. The bishop busied himself with the idea of building up an adequate edifice for his seminary. The bishop begged and appealed to his people for help which they gave generously. Of special mention in this regard were the sisters Ana and Maria Sitchon, the priest Mariano Sitchon, and Dona Gregoria Hingson - all from Parian (now Molo). On March 11, 1871, the cornerstone was laid and the construction of the seminary begun under the direction of Aniceto Gonzales who acted as foreman. The priests and seminarians joined the workers during their free time. They carried the bricks from the riverbank where the bancas unloaded them to the place of work. Cuarteto was seen many time carrying the bricks with the seminarians. By October 1872, a good part of building was finished and ready for use. The seminary was transferred amidst the jubilation of all. In the same year, Gonzales had succeeded Moral as rector. He gave the construction a great support. The building was completed in November 1874.

The seminary, as completed in 1874, was of quadrilateral shape with dimensions 54 x 52 meters. In the center was the interior garden measuring 23 square meters. The first floor was made of stone and bricks while the second floor was made of hard wood. At that time it was undoubtedly the best seminary in the Philippines.

== The Collegio-Seminario ==
The new seminary soon became the most popular and first center of secondary education in the island. The number of students who requested to be allowed to take secondary education in the seminary but without any intention of pursuing priesthood was so many. Ildefonso Moral, who was reappointed rector in 1875, decided to open the seminary doors to lay students as had already been done in other diocesan seminaries. Thus the seminary lost its character of being a school solely and exclusively for priestly formation. But this adulteration of the Tridentine institution was partly due to certain historical circumstances.

The innovation introduced to seminary studies proved a success. The number of students increased year after year. The average enrolment from 1875 to 1891 was of some 150 interns and three hundred externs. Statistics found in the book "Exposicion General de las Islas Filipinas in Madrid, 1887-Memoria" show a total enrolment of 5,344 for the year 1875–1885. So, it became imperative the building. When the Cuartero died in 1884, Juan Miralda was appointed the rector and he undertook the new construction. It consisted of adding 46 meters to the already 52-meter-long right wing of the building. The actual building thus looked then like a letter "P". The expenses of this work added to those of 1874 made a total sum of some PhP 250,000.00.

The St. Vincent Ferrer Seminary was the first of the seminaries to be run by the Vincentian fathers to become a first class college, being fully incorporated in the University of Santo Tomas in 1891. Sometime in 1890, Bishop Arrue asked permission from Governor General Valeriano Weyler for the authorization to offer baccalaureate studies for those students who, having finished secondary education here, could not afford to pursue college studies in Manila. The request was granted without delay since the institution had complied with all the requirements of Art. 13 del Reglamento 1867. From then on and until 1897 when the first signs of Filipino-Spanish conflict started, the seminary enjoyed a flourishing life. Its average yearly enrollment was of some one hundred fifty interns and some six to seven hundred externs.

== Revolution for Philippine independence ==
The happy school days came to sudden stop with the outbreak of Filipino-Spanish conflict. The seminary became a military barrack of three nationalities: first by the Spanish soldiers, then by the Filipino forces and later by the American soldiers. By then, the seminarians had disbanded to the provinces and some of the fathers had sailed to Manila. On February 11, 1898, the American soldiers occupied the seminary. The seminary fathers headed by the priests Viera (rector), Napal, Zaro were ordered to abandon the seminary. They proceeded to Sta. Barbara and presented themselves with Gen. Martin Delgado, the revolutionary leader during the guerilla war. He was an alumnus of the seminario-colegio and because of this, he treated them cordially. Upon his advice, they continued their flight up north in search for a safe place to stay. By March 6, the fathers received instruction from Delgado to return to Iloilo. Since the American soldiers occupied the seminary, the fathers made their residence in Colegio de San Jose.

== During the American Period ==
Acting upon the request of the apostolic delegate, Bishop Andrés Ferrero y Malo de San José requested the fathers to return to the seminary. This they did in February 1902. Their first task was to condition the seminary for the opening of classes, for they had found it in disarray. As Mariano Napal said, if they wanted to sit down, they had to do it on the staircases.

The new fathers joined the community. By 1903 there were three new seminary fathers: Juan Villa, Rector, Pedro Santamaria, and Leandro Zaro. The arrival of Bishop Frederick Zadok Rooker in the diocese helped a lot in reorganizing the seminary life. With his help, the seminary was back to normal life at the beginning of the school year 1904–1905. Once more, the seminary knew days of prosperity under the American flag. The enrolment for the school year 1906-1907 was more than six hundred students. Later, Bishop Dougherty made more improvements. He spent some Php 40,000.000 for this project. His friends in America gave the funds spent for this improvements, which brought prosperity days to the seminary. From that time on, the yearly enrolment reached around 180 interns and some 600 externs.

== Destruction of the first seminary building ==
On the night of October 7, 1906, a sudden fire caused by a candle, left carelessly burning in the sacristy by the seminarian in charge of it, reduced the building into a heap of ashes. Nothing was saved but no-one was hurt among the seminarians and the fathers.

== Second seminary building ==
Two months after the fire, Rooker began reconstructing it, backed by the moral and financial support of his priests, the people of Jaro, his many friends in America, and Pope Pius X who sent substantial financial help. The seminary was housed temporarily in a spacious building of Don Teodoro Benedicto. In less than a year, three fifths of the building was completed, sufficient to house one hundred interns. The return of the seminary to its own house was completed on September 17, 1907. The next day, the atmosphere became dismal by misfortune. Early in the afternoon of the 18 September, Rooker was stricken by heart attack and died hours later.

== Incumbency of Dennis Cardinal Dougherty ==
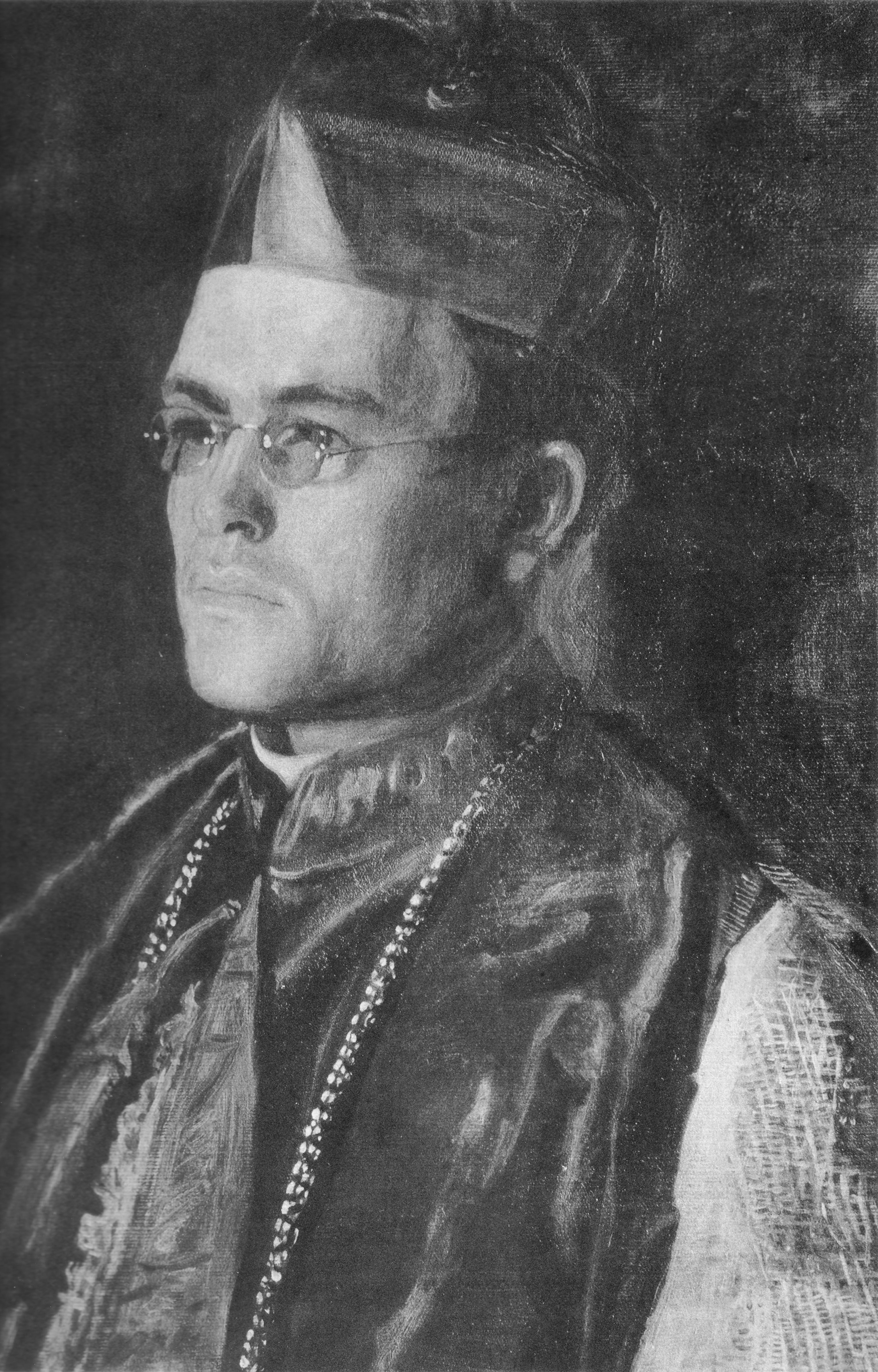
Right Reverend Dennis J. Dougherty (1903) by Thomas Eakins, private collection.

In 1908, the St. Vincent Ferrer seminary was blessed with two great benefactors: Bishop Dennis Joseph Dougherty, later Cardinal Archbishop of Philadelphia, who succeeded Rooker, and Mariano Napal, a man whose life ran parallel to that of the seminary. Both gave much attention to the seminary and brought the construction of the building to completion, on March 12, 1912. Dougherty spent some Php 40,000.000 for the rehabilitation of the seminary. His friends in America gave the funds spent for the improvements. The prosperous days brought about by the rebuilding of the seminary increased the yearly enrolment to 180 interns and around 600 externs.

== The reform of the seminary programme ==
In 1925, the St. Vincent Ferrer as a Seminario-Colegios was a distortion of the Tridentine institution. The Colegio drained the strength and vigor of the seminario. The constant contact of the seminarians with outsiders, and living together under the same roof of seminarians and lay students proved more harmful than beneficial to the seminary. As the number of the "Colegiales" grew by the year, so the number of seminarians decreased. According to Eliseo Rodriguez, who had been connected with the Seminary since 1911 has this to say, from 1911 to 1925 the Jaro Seminary had a population of 30 to 40 seminarians and some five to six hundred "colegiales".

This fact and the reason that the Seminario-colegios were not what the church meant them to be, moved the Pope to exert all the means available to restore the seminaries to their purpose. Pope Leo XIII, for instance, wrote to the bishops in 1899: "It must not be forgotten that the only and exclusive purpose of the Seminary is the formation of the youth, not for civic careers, whatever good and noble they may be, but for Priesthood." At the end of the school year 1924–1925, the colegios were either closed or brought apart from the seminaries. The Colegio de San Vicente Ferrer was transferred to the cathedral convent in 1925. Unfortunately, it was closed definitely two years later.

As expected, the separation of the colegios from the seminaries proved beneficial to the latter. The priestly studies, though, had always been in conformity with the norms of the church, received a great impulse, and the priestly training of the seminarians were given a close attention on the part of the faculty. Vocations, too, increased notably. For example, for the school year 1937-1938 there were 97 Latinists, 19 in two-year course of Philosophy, and 45 Theologians. The Seminary, however, suffered economically with the separation of the Colegio. As matter of fact the Colegio is the main source of income for the Seminary. From 1913 to 1916, the seminary had not received any financial help from the diocese. And during the administration of Bishop Maurice Foley (1919–1919), all the assistance given to the seminary was some Php 3,000.00. Theoretically the seminarians' tuition fee per semester was Php 80.00; many of them could not pay their accounts because they came from poor families.

== During the time of Bishop James McCloskey ==
In 1920, the arrival of Bishop James McCloskey in the Diocese of Jaro brought financial stability to the St. Vincent Ferrer Seminary. He founded the association "Pro Seminario" and by a system of "Burses" in 1925. This added to the "seminaristicum" provided with quite economic bases. According to the report of Eliseo Rodriguez, who had been the procurator of the Seminary, McCloskey used to give Php 20,000.00 annually for the maintenance of the seminary. On the Bishop's order, the minor seminarians paid as tuition Php 200.00 per year, philosophers Php 150.00, and theologians PhP100.00. The bishop took care of whatever amount was needed beyond that. The bishop's sources of income were his friends in America.

== World War II ==
In 1941, the World War II brought the happy seminary life to a sudden stop. The Japanese attacked Pearl Harbor and placed the Philippines in a state of alarm. The atmosphere became tense and Mariano Auzmendi, rector, caught by the general panic and perilous situation, closed classes on December 12. That same day 121 Seminarians disbanded to the provinces. The priests, twelve in number and ten ordinands remained in the seminary.

On April 16, 1942, the Japanese occupied the city of Iloilo, and with that began a period of fear. Due to the fact that McCloskey was sick and hospitalized in Manila, the rector, after having obtained permission from the Japanese, took the ten ordinands to Bacolod for their priestly ordination on June 29. From that date the seminary was, more than anything else, a center of refugees. Life in it was a dread because of the many incursions made by the Japanese soldiers. To avoid dangerous situations, Auzmendi authorized the priests to disperse to safer places. Accordingly, the priests Victorino Gonzalez, Jacinto Iroz, and Pedro Pampliega made their residence at the Asilo de Molo, Colegio de San Jose and Colegio del Sagrado Corazon de Jesus respectively. They served as chaplains in these institutions. Of the nine who decided to stay in the seminary, they died soon as a result of tension and fear. The first victim was Lucio Ortega, he died on April 12, 1942. He had been associated with the seminary since 1935. Beside his seminary work, he gave a tremendous attention to the Apostleship of Prayer and to the catechetic of the diocese. He was called "the Master of Ceremonies." Next to fall was Luis Egeda, professor since 1942. He was humble, jolly and very learned; qualities, which made him win a lot of friends. He died in Manila in 1945, a victim of the Japanese bayonet. The third victim was Auzmendi, rector. He had been in Jaro as rector since 1932. He died on November 16, 1942.

In February 1943, Jose Maria Cuenco, the newly consecrated bishop came to the diocese as an Auxiliary of Bishop McCloskey. Many problems demanded his attention and one of them was the seminary. He had Eliseo Rodriguez appointed as rector on May 31, 1943. Then the bishop and the new rector tried to resume classes to show the Japanese authorities that the seminary was a center of learning and to avoid the danger of having the seminary building occupied for military purposes. However, all their efforts to proved useless. Only two seminaries, returned to the seminary, one deacon and one sub-deacon returned to the seminary. They tried again the next year. With the help of the parish priests, classes were opened in January 1944 with 23 seminarians major and minor. By the end of March, the seminarians went home for their summer vacation, but they did not come back anymore. Only five major seminarians were present for the opening of classes on June 15, 9144. One of the seminarians, a deacon, was ordained priest on July. The other four continued their studies up to September 13 when for the first time the American planes started bombing the Mandurriao Airport and one of t bombs lightly damaged the seminary building. That brought to an end of the Seminary work until January 1946.

== The destruction of the building during liberation ==
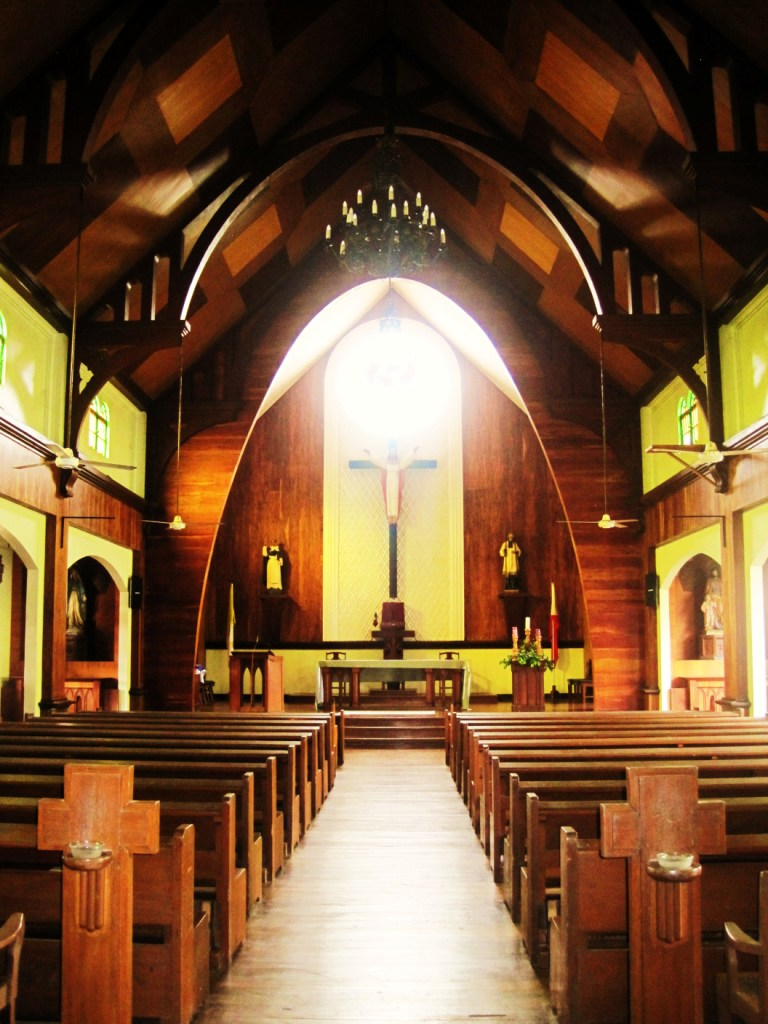
Interior of the Neo-Gothic Chapel of St. Vincent Ferrer Seminary

February 20, 1945, will always be remembered as a day in the history of the seminary. Early in the morning a squadron of American planes appeared in the sky heading straight toward the seminary. Then, all of a sudden, their machineguns rattled and a number of incendiary bombs fell on the building and surroundings. In less than thirty minutes the building, which was a lasting tribute to the American bishops, in favor of the Jaro Clergy became a pile of ashes and twisted irons. Fortunately, there was not a single casualty among the fathers, and the three hundred refugees.

On March 19, 1945, Iloilo was liberated. Life returned to normal and everybody resumed the work stopped by the war. With the death of McCloskey on April 19, 1945, Bishop Cuenco became the diocesan bishop on November 27, 1945. He began rebuilding the diocese and the seminary. The first plan of the bishop in re-opening the seminary was in the parish convent of Sta. Barbara. However, the opinion of Rodriguez was to begin in the old place in Jaro for practical and sentimental reasons. The opinion of Rodriguez prevailed. There were still many usable things in the ruined building, which had been used and partly repaired by the American soldiers.

On January 7, 1946, classes were resumed with 32 major seminarians attending. The faculty was composed of the following: Rodriguez, Rector; Jacinto Iroz; Nicolas Urabayen; Jose Villar and Jacinto Gonzalez. On June 15 of the same year, classes opened with eighty seminarians and eight professors.

== Archbishop Jose Maria Cuenco and the reconstruction of the building ==
Meanwhile, Bishop Jose Maria Cuenco was planning to put up a solid and more prestigious building than the one destroyed by the bombs.

On June 19, 1946, the Archdiocese of Jaro (Elevated; 1951) had again a modern and excellent feminary for the proper training of its future priests. The seminary had known a good number of changes of great importance. In 1957, the seminary became de facto a regional major seminary when the bishops of the suffragan dioceses of Bacolod (1946), Capiz (1957), Antique (1963) and even the Prelature of Palawan enrolled their major seminarians in this seminary. The number of seminarians had broken all the previous records, introducing new subjects and adding new courses and had updated the plan of studies. The department of Latin and philosophy had come under government recognition. In 1958, the St. Vincent Ferrer Seminary obtained government recognition of its studies of philosophy and power to grant the bachelor of arts degree.

Don Teodoro Benedicto, Don Joaquin Ledesma, and Dona Pilar Ledesma, were the benefactors of the seminary, among others. The seminary personnel- Marcos "Tio Mankoy" Frondoso the great guardian, Florencio "Chef" Tubola, among others – who have spent most of their lives in the service of the seminary fathers and the seminarians. The Saint Vincent Ferrer Seminary takes pride in having produced distinguished clergymen like Gabriel Reyes, the first Filipino Archbishop of Manila, and Cardinal Jaime Sin who also became the Archbishop of Manila and had inspired the People Power Revolution at EDSA that set off a wave of democratization movements that spread to Taiwan and South Korea and even fell the Berlin wall and ended Communist rule in Eastern Europe. It also helped inspire the Arab Spring in 2011., and Archbishop Jose S. Palma, the current Archbishop of Cebu.

== Famous alumni ==
- Jaime Lachica Sin (31 August 1928 – 21 June 2005), was the third Filipino Archbishop of Manila, a cardinal, who was considered an influential and charismatic leader of the Filipino people having led another "People Power" revolution.
- Gabriel Reyes - (March 24, 1892 – October 10, 1952) was the First Filipino Archbishop of Manila
- Graciano López Jaena - (December 18, 1856 – January 20, 1896) was a journalist, orator, revolutionary, and national hero from Iloilo, the Philippines, who is well known for his newspaper, La Solidaridad.
- Martin Teofilo Delgado - (1858–1918) was a Revolutionary Leader during the War for Philippine Independence.
- Alberto Jover Piamonte, (March 24, 1934 – December 17, 1998) was the fourth Archbishop of Jaro.
- Jose S. Palma, (March 19, 1950), is the fourth Archbishop of Cebu and the former President of the Catholic Bishops' Conference of the Philippines (CBCP).
- Fernando Capalla, (November 1, 1934), was former Archbishop of Davao, and former President of the Catholic Bishops' Conference of the Philippines.
- Dinualdo Gutierrez, Third Bishop of Marbel (November 15, 1982 - 2018)
- Jose Romeo O. Lazo, Archbishop of Jaro (14 February 2018 – present).

== See also ==
- Jaro Archdiocese
- Jaro Cathedral
