= Nuestra Señora de la Candelaria de Jaro =

Venerated image of the Blessed Virgin Mary in the Philippines

Our Lady of the Purification and the Candle Nuestra Señora de la Purificación y la Candelaria
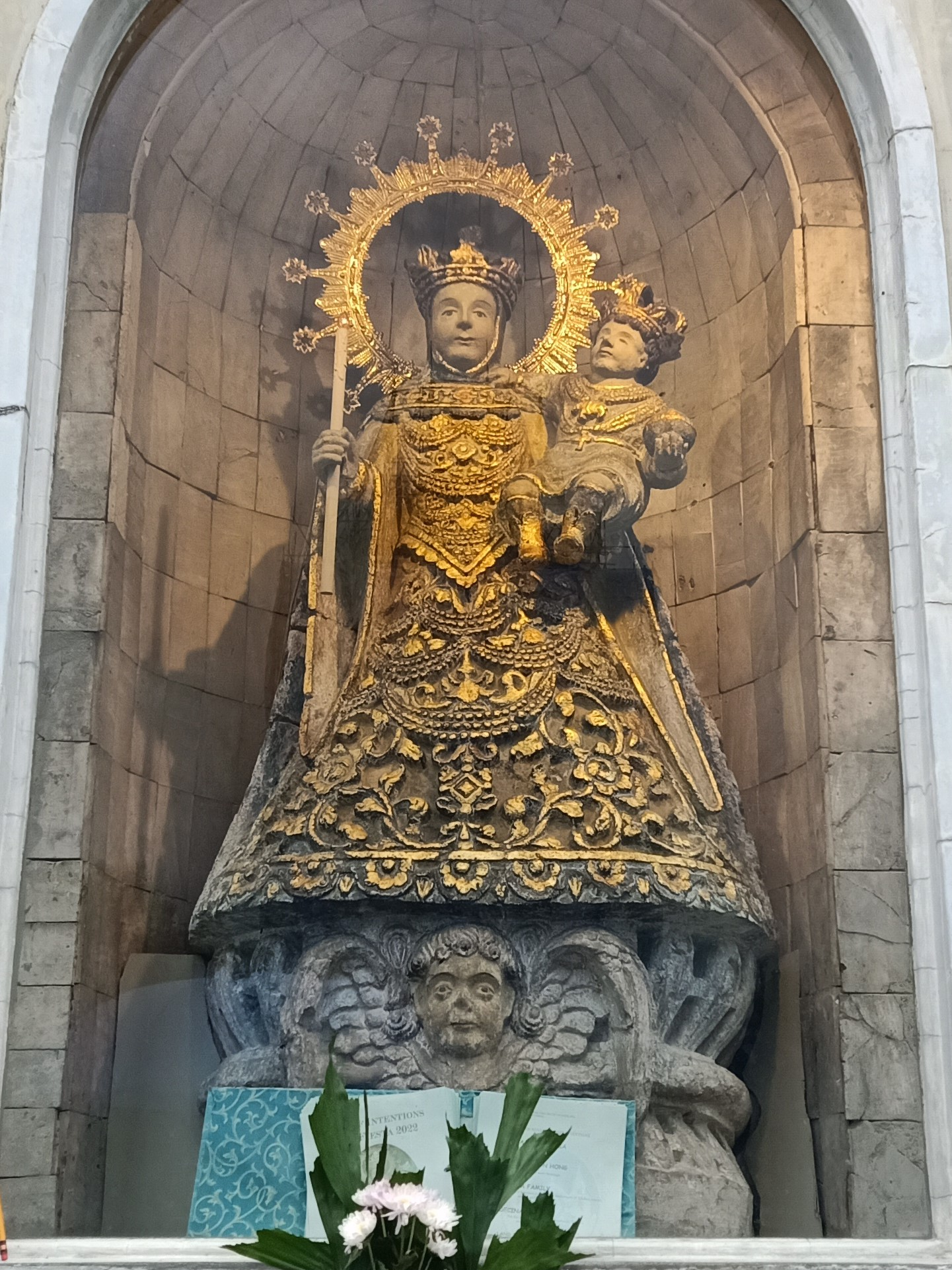
- The icon enshrined on the balcony of Jaro Cathedral.
- Location: Jaro, Iloilo City, Philippines
- Date: April 1587
- Witness: Don Cristobal Mercado
- Type: Limestone
- Approval: Pope John Paul II
- Shrine: National Shrine of the Our Lady of Candles
- Patronage: Jaro, Iloilo City, Western Visayas
- Feast day: February 2

Nuestra Señora de la Purificación y la Candelaria (English: "Our Lady of the Purification and the Candle") is a venerated image of the Blessed Virgin Mary enshrined in Jaro Cathedral and the patroness of Western Visayas region and Negros Occidental province.

The devotion to Candelaria de Jaro derives from the original Virgin of Candelaria in Canarias, Spain and its feast day or Candlemas is celebrated every February 2.

Pope John Paul II personally crowned the image on 20 February 1981. It is also the first Marian image in Asia crowned by a Catholic saint in person. The same Pontiff declared this title as the patroness of Western Visayas via his decree Quod Urbes Ecclesliasticæ in 21 April 1982.

== Description ==
The title commemorates Mary's ritual purification during the Presentation of Jesus. Halakha (Jewish law) ordered that firstborn sons be redeemed at the Temple in Jerusalem when they were 40 days old. The mother, who expelled blood during the birth, was considered unclean for a week and 33 days thereafter, necessitating her purification at the same time the child is redeemed. Even though in Catholic doctrine, Mary herself was considered sinless ever since her Concepcion due to the merits of Christ. This, according to the theological treatises of Blessed Ramon Llull, the original author who wrote of the doctrine of "The Immaculate Concepcion". He was an ardent admirer as well as a staunch critic of Islamic thinkers: Al-Farabi, Avicenna and Ibn Sab'in. The Virgin Mary was pure and virginal: before, during and after Christ's birth, and has no need for "ritual purification" but due to her humility participated in the ritual anyway and by her humility showed the way for the purification of the whole of mankind. The Christ-child wears a necklace of gold bearing an elephant, giving it connections to the ancient kingdom of Pannai in Sumatra wherein Panay Island, the Filipino island where Jaro is in, was descended from the said kingdom. And Pannai being a member of the Buddhist Srivijaya Empire which controlled the Strait of Malacca the world's busiest maritime seaport, for 600 years, this is where the elephant was sacred to Hinduism and Buddhism, making the Nuestra Señora de la Candelaria de Jaro a functional Palladium (protective image) with partial prehispanic and precolonial origins and symbolism albeit converted to Catholic Christianity now. As Srivijaya was the political entity which controlled the Strait of Malacca (The world's busiest shipping lane) the longest, this was matched by the devotion of the people of Iloilo, a city under the Archdiocese of Jaro, which was the last overseas capital of the entire Spanish Empire which once stretched from the Mediterranean to the Americas and to Asia and was given by Queen Maria Cristina of Spain, the title (Spanish: La muy leal y noble ciudad de Iloilo), The Most Loyal and Noble City of Iloilo due to Iloilo which remained loyal and steadfast amidst the total collapse of the Spanish Empire, making the city the most loyal city in the entire Spanish Empire.

== Marian cult and veneration ==
The limestone statue discovered in the 16th-century was miraculously lifted up by fishermen who discovered its weight changed from something unable to be carried to one which was able to, when the Bishop declared that it should be placed on the Jaro church. It was also once found floating in the Iloilo River, something fascinating since stone statues don't usually float. It depicts Mary and the Child Jesus carrying tapers in their right hands, which is a symbol of light and purification. It is customarily vested in gold cloth; crowns adorn mother and son, the latter holding a globus cruciger in his left hand symbolizing Christ's reign over the whole earth. The candle held by the cathedral's holy image is today tipped with a red electrical bulb.

== History ==
Pope John Paul II personally crowning the image on February 20, 1981.

Tradition recounts the statue's first appearance in 1587, when a group of fishermen found it floating in the Iloilo River. The fishermen initially could not lift the image due to its weight, but when they decided to bring it to Jaro, the image suddenly became easier to carry. The statue was initially placed in a small niche near the apex of the local church's central spire. Folklore speaks of the statue's growth in size over the centuries, to the point that it was transferred to the balcony. The image's shrine is accessible today by a flight of steps attached to the cathedral's northeastern façade.

The statue was declared patroness of the Western Visayas by Pope John Paul II who, in person, canonically crowned this image on February 20, 1981, during his first Apostolic Visit to the Philippines. It is thus the only Marian statue in the Philippines personally crowned by the Pontiff (and saint) instead of a proxy legate.

== National Shrine ==
Pope Pius IX authorised the canonical erection of the Diocese of Jaro on May 25, 1865. Bishop Mariano Cuartero took possession of the diocese in 1868, and later partitioned it into nine dioceses. In 1874, Cuartero had the cathedral built on the site, dedicating it to Elizabeth of Hungary.

The original edifice was among the many structures destroyed in the Lady Caycay earthquake, an 8.2 surface wave magnitude tremor which struck Panay Island on January 25, 1948. Pope Pius XII elevated Jaro to an archdiocese on June 29, 1951, via a papal bull, and the cathedral was fully restored by 1956 under José María Cuenco, the first Archbishop of Jaro.

In January 2012, the Catholic Bishops' Conference of the Philippines approved "National Shrine of the Our Lady of Candles" as an additional title for the cathedral.

=== Confraternity ===
The Cofradia de la Nuestra Señora de la Candelaria is the shrine's lay confraternity recognized by the Archdiocese of Jaro.

== Feast ==
Feast of Our Lady of the Candles
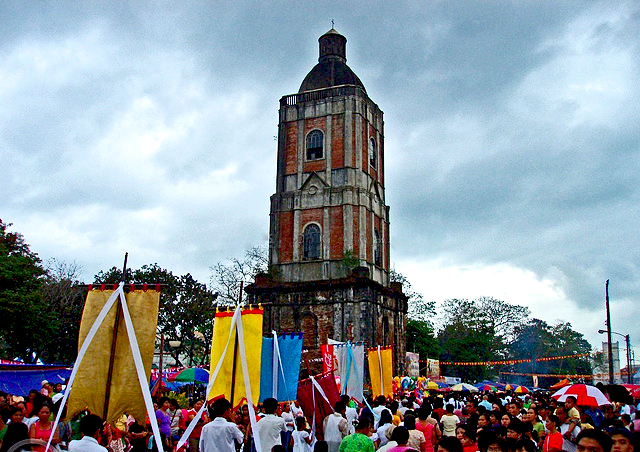
- Devotees gather around Jaro Plaza, in front of Jaro Cathedral, to join the solemn procession.
- Observed by: Philippines
- Liturgical color: White
- Type: Religious / Cultural
- Date: 2 February
- Frequency: Annual

The Feast of Our Lady of the Candles, also known as the Jaro Fiesta, is an annual religious festival celebrated every February 2 in the district of Jaro. It is considered one of the largest Marian feasts in the country. The celebration is district-wide, with the main activities centered around Jaro Plaza and the Jaro Cathedral.

The festival begins on January 24 with daily novena prayers and novenario masses that continue until February 1. The masses are celebrated both at the cathedral’s main altar and at the grotto in the cathedral grounds. A significant event on February 1 is the Coronation of Nuestra Señora de la Candelaria, a solemn ceremony honoring the patroness. The feast day itself, February 2, features two pontifical masses. The morning mass, conducted in Hiligaynon, includes the blessing of candles brought by the faithful, while the evening mass is celebrated in English.

Another unique tradition observed on February 2 is the Discurso sa Mahal nga Iloy (transl. Discourse on the Blessed Mother), a liturgical event that commemorates the presentation of the Child Jesus in the temple and the purification of Mary, reflecting biblical customs. Central to this tradition is the binalaybay, where a young person offers songs and prayers extolling the virtues of the Virgin Mary. The day culminates in a grand procession where the image of Nuestra Señora de la Candelaria is carried through the streets of Jaro. The procession is led by the Jaro Fiesta Queen and her court, along with representatives of local schools, barangays, institutions, clergy, and organizations.

Beyond the religious activities, the festival also includes the Jaro-Agro Industrial and Charity Fair, a trade fair showcasing local products from Jaro. Another highlight is the Jaro Fiesta Queen, a longstanding tradition where the queen and her court are selected from prominent families in Jaro. The queen makes three major appearances: during the kick-off float parade in late January, the religious procession on February 2, and the coronation night.

== See also ==
- Catholic Church in the Philippines
- Jaro Cathedral
- Archdiocese of Jaro
- St. Vincent Ferrer Seminary
