= Archdiocese of Jaro =

Roman Catholic archdiocese in the Philippines

Archdiocese of Jaro Archdiocesis Jarensis: Arkidiyosesis sang Jaro; Arkidiyosesis ng Jaro; Arquidiócesis de Jaro

Catholic
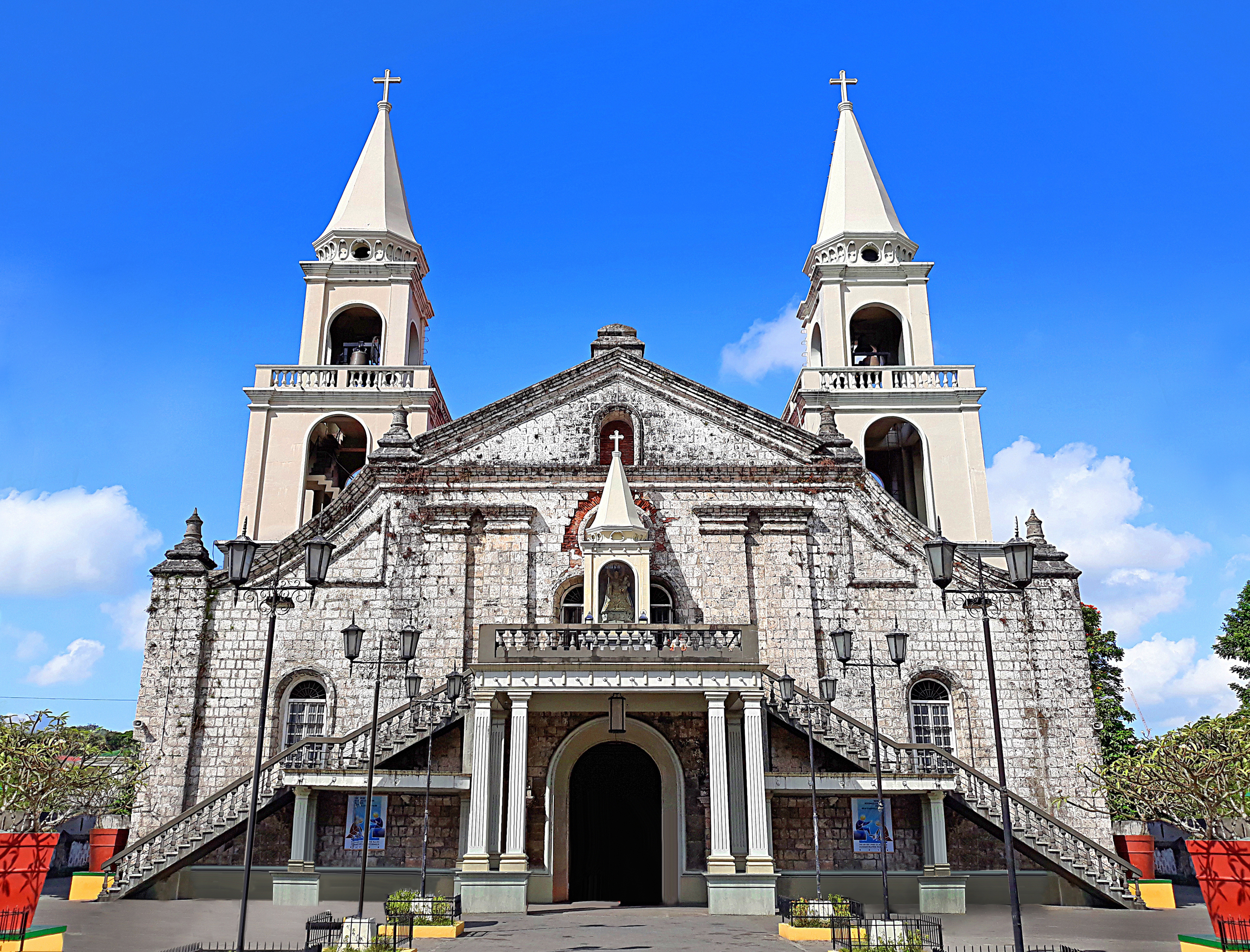
- Jaro Cathedral

- Coat of arms

Location
- Country: Philippines
- Territory: Iloilo; Guimaras
- Ecclesiastical province: Jaro
- Headquarters: Jaro, Iloilo City
- Coordinates: 10.7234°N 122.556°E

Statistics
- Area: 5,303 km^{2} (2,047 sq mi)
- Population: Total; Catholics: (as of 2021); 3,668,000; 3,049,000 (83.1%)
- Parishes: 95

Information
- Denomination: Catholic
- Sui iuris church: Latin Church
- Rite: Roman Rite
- Established: March 3, 1575; 451 years ago; 1587 (Vista); May 27, 1865; 161 years ago (diocese); June 29, 1951; 75 years ago (archdiocese)
- Cathedral: Metropolitan Cathedral of St. Elizabeth of Hungary
- Patron saint: Elizabeth of Hungary (archdiocesan); Our Lady of the Candles (Western Visayas)
- Secular priests: 166

Current leadership
- Pope: Leo XIV
- Metropolitan Archbishop: Most Rev. Midyphil B. Billones, D.D.
- Suffragans: Louie P. Galbines (Bacolod); Sede vacante (Kabankalan); Gerardo A. Alminaza (San Carlos); Marvyn A. Maceda (San Jose de Antique)
- Vicar General: Very Rev. Msgr. Alejandro P. Esperancilla, PC, VG
- Bishops emeritus: Jose Romeo Lazo, D.D. (2018-2025) Angel Lagdameo, D.D. (2000-2018) Alberto Jover Piamonte, D.D. (1986-1998) Artemio G. Casas, D.D. (1974-1985) Jaime Sin, D.D. (1972-1974) Jose Maria Cuenco, D.D. (bishop, 1945-1951) (archbishop, 1951-1972)

Map
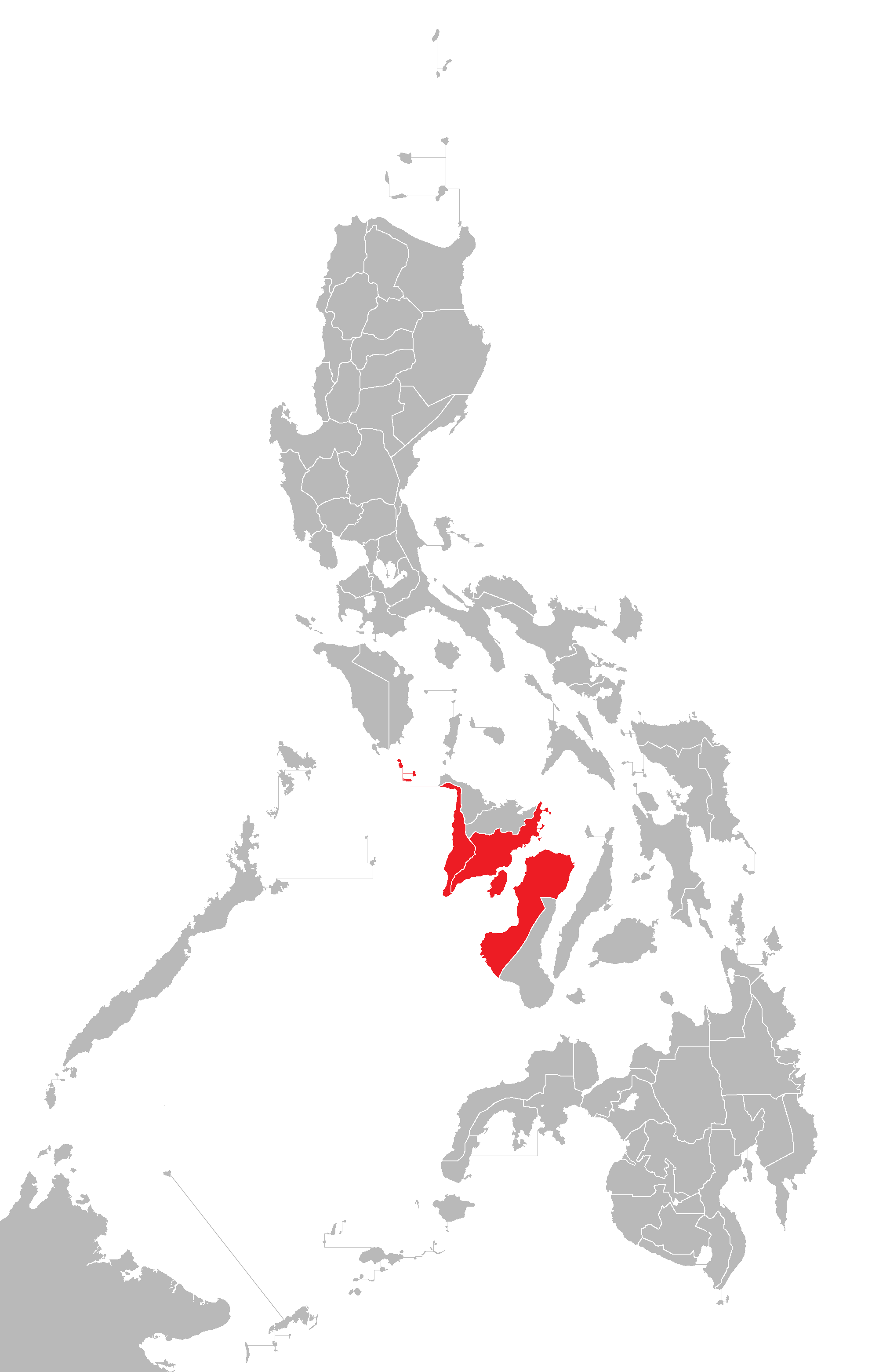
- Jurisdiction of the metropolitan see within the Philippines

Website
- Archdiocese of Jaro

The Archdiocese of Jaro (Latin: Archdiocesis Jarensis; Hiligaynon: Arkidiyosesis sang Jaro; Filipino: Arkidiyosesis ng Jaro; Spanish: Arquidiócesis de Jaro) is a Latin Church archdiocese of the Catholic Church headquartered in Jaro, Iloilo City, Philippines. Its episcopal see is at the Metropolitan Cathedral of St. Elizabeth of Hungary, also the National Shrine of Our Lady of Candles, as its seat. The metropolitan archdiocese covers the provinces of Iloilo, Guimaras, Antique, and Negros Occidental. Its titular patron saint is Elizabeth of Hungary, whose feast is celebrated on November 17.

The Archdiocese of Jaro is one of the oldest episcopal sees in the country.

The current Jaro Cathedral was founded on March 3, 1575 and became a Parish or Vista of the town of Oton in 1587. It was formally established as a see of a new Diocese on May 27, 1865 through a papal bull of Pope Pius IX, according to a document signed by Archbishop Gregorio Martinez, then archbishop of Manila. The diocese was created from the territory of the Archdiocese of Manila. Its first bishop was Mariano Cuartero, a Dominican missionary in the Philippines, who took possession of the diocese, on April 25, 1868. It is also one of the largest episcopal sees during the Spanish colonial era encompassing the whole island of Panay (Aklan, Antique, Capiz, Guimaras and Iloilo provinces), Mindoro, Romblon, Negros (Negros Occidental and Negros Oriental provinces), Palawan, Davao, Sulu, Cotabato and Zamboanga Peninsula as part of its jurisdiction.

On April 10, 1910, it lost some of its territories to the newly created Diocese of Zamboanga and Apostolic Prefecture of Palawan. Negros Oriental (Dumaguete) was also a part of it, but became a separate diocese under Cebu. Later, three other ecclesiastical jurisdictions were established from its territory: the Diocese of Bacolod (July 15, 1932), Apostolic Prefecture of Mindoro (July 2, 1936), and the Diocese of Capiz (January 27, 1951).

On April 28, 1934, Pope Pius XI promulgated apostolic constitution Romanorum Pontificum semper separating the dioceses of Cebu, Calbayog, Jaro, Bacolod, Zamboanga and Cagayan de Oro from the ecclesiastical province of Manila. The same constitution elevated the diocese of Cebu into an archdiocese while placing all the newly separated dioceses under a new ecclesiastical province with Cebu as the new metropolitan see. On June 29, 1951, it was raised as a metropolitan archdiocese by Pope Pius XII. On March 24, 1962, it lost some territory to establish the Territorial Prelature of San Jose de Antique, which was later elevated as a diocese in 1982.

The ecclesiastical province of Jaro consists of the metropolitan archdiocese of the same name, as well as its suffragan dioceses of Bacolod, San Carlos, and Kabankalan, all in the province of Negros Occidental, and San Jose de Antique in the province of Antique.

== History ==
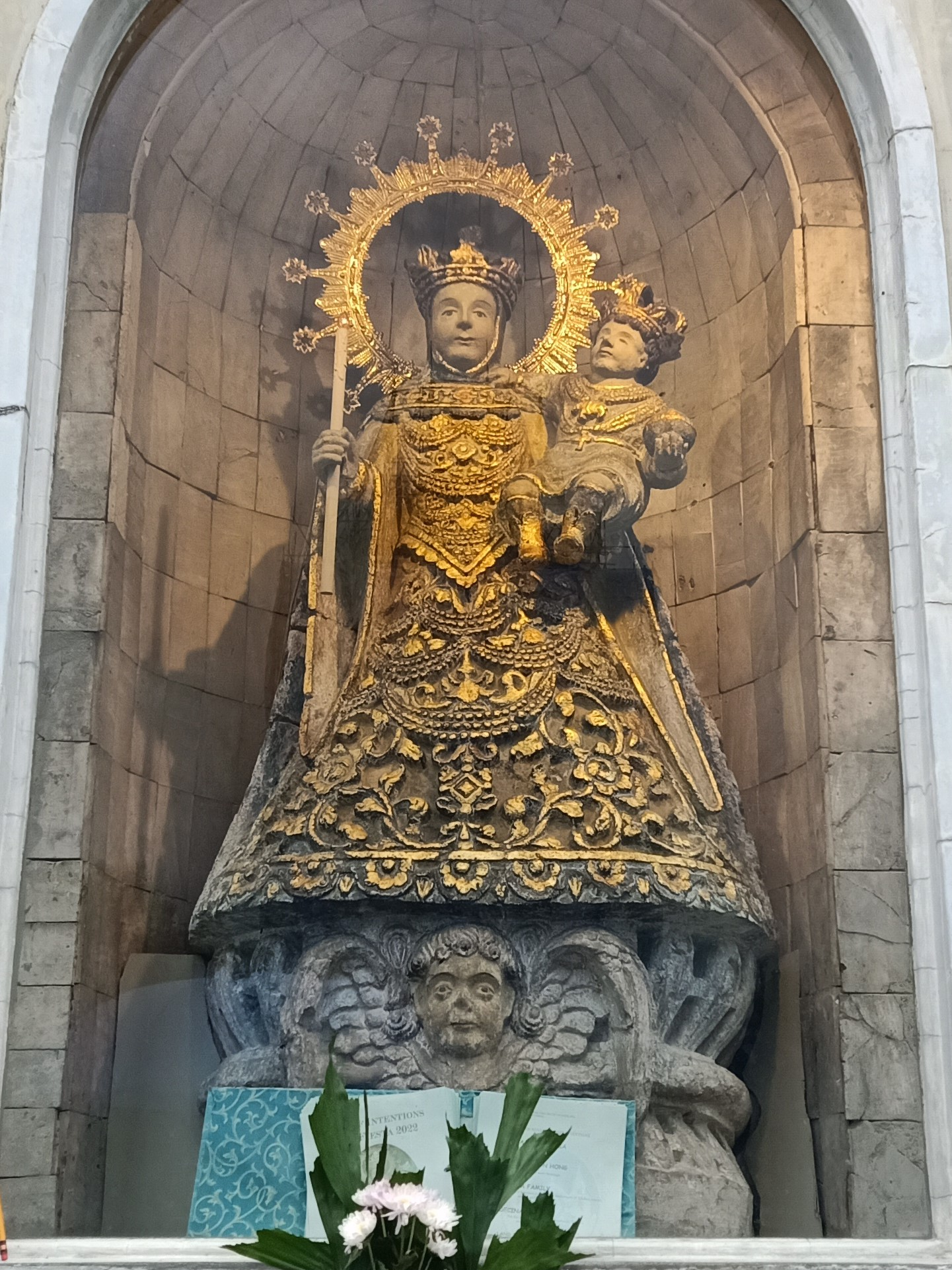
Image of Nuestra Señora de la Candelaria (Our Lady of Candles) perched atop the facade of Jaro Cathedral in Jaro, Iloilo City. It is the first marian statue canonically crowned personal without a papal legate by a pope and saint in the Philippines and Asia when John Paul II visited the Philippine islands in 1981, elevating her as the official patron of Western Visayas and Romblon.

The coat of arms of the Archdiocese of Jaro, during the 1950s

The precursor of the Archdiocese of Jaro dates back when it was founded in 1587 as a parish by the Spanish colonists. The diocese of Jaro whose patron saint is Elizabeth of Hungary was officially and formally established by virtue of the Papal bull "Qui Ab Initio" of Pope Pius IX, issued in Rome on May 27, 1865. On October 10, 1867, the decree took effect and Jaro was made an Episcopal See, according to the document signed by D. Gregorio Meliton Martinez, then archbishop of Manila and executor-delegate of the decree. It is worth noting that this "decretum executorium" was also signed by Jose Burgos, Pro-Secretary, a secular priest who became one of the outstanding martyr-heroes of the country.

Jaro was carved out from the then Diocese of Cebu and became a suffragan diocese of the Archdiocese of Manila. Its territories at creation comprised the islands of Panay, (now composed of the provinces of Iloilo, Capiz, Antique and Aklan), Guimaras, Negros (now the twin provinces of Negros Occidental and Negros Oriental), Romblon and Palawan, as well as the provinces of Cotabato, Zamboanga, Davao and Sulu of Mindanao. Mariano Cuartero became its first bishop on April 25, 1868.

In the 20th century the diocese was further divided to form new ecclesiastical jurisdictions. Zamboanga was made a separate diocese in 1910, while Palawan was made an apostolic prelature in the same year; then Bacolod in 1933, Capiz in 1951 and finally the Prelature of San Jose, Antique in 1962 as suffragans.

Concurrently with the elevation of Jaro to an archdiocese, the first Filipino bishop, Jose Maria Cuenco, was raised to the rank of metropolitan archbishop, thereby making him the first archbishop of Jaro.

On January 17, 1976, Pope Paul VI elevated Capiz to the rank of archdiocese, with the dioceses of Romblon and Kalibo as its suffragans. The Archdiocese of Jaro was left with the dioceses of Bacolod (which eventually was divided into three dioceses: Bacolod, San Carlos, and Kabankalan) and San Jose de Antique as its suffragans.

On February 20, 1981, Pope John Paul II visited the archdiocese and crowned the image of Nuestra Señora de la Candelaria at the facade of Jaro Cathedral, the first Marian image crowned personally without a papal legate by a pope.

== Coat of arms ==
The black eagle and the three red roses refer to Saint Elizabeth of Hungary or of Thuringia, patroness of the Jaro Cathedral. The coconut on a green knoll represents Jaro.

== Ordinaries ==
Bishop		Period in office	Notes	Coat of arms
Bishops of Jaro (May 27, 1865 – June 29, 1951)
1	Mariano Cuartero y Medina, O.P.	September 20, 1867 – July 16, 1884 (16 years, 300 days)	Died in office	
2	Leandro Arrúe Agudo, O.A.R.	March 27, 1885 – October 24, 1897 (12 years, 211 days)	Died in office	
3	Andrés Ferrero y Malo de San José, O.A.R.	March 24, 1898 – October 27, 1903 (5 years, 217 days)	Resigned	
4	Frederick Zadok Rooker	June 12, 1903 – September 20, 1907 (4 years, 100 days)	Died in office	
5	Dennis Joseph Dougherty	April 19, 1908 – December 6, 1915 (7 years, 231 days)	Appointed bishop of Buffalo	
6	Maurice Patrick Foley	September 6, 1916 – August 7, 1919 (2 years, 335 days)	Died in office	
7	James Paul McCloskey	March 8, 1920 – April 10, 1945 (25 years, 33 days)	Died in office	
8	José María Cuenco	November 24, 1945 – June 29, 1951 (5 years, 217 days)	Elevated to archbishop in 1951	
Archbishops of Jaro (June 29, 1951 – present)
1	José María Cuenco	June 29, 1951 – October 8, 1972 (21 years, 101 days)	Died in office	
2	Jaime Lachica Sin, O.F.S.	October 8, 1972 – January 21, 1974 (1 year, 105 days)	Appointed archbishop of Manila	
3	Artemio G. Casas	May 11, 1974 – October 25, 1985 (11 years, 167 days)	Resigned	
4	Alberto Jover Piamonte	April 2, 1986 – December 17, 1998 (12 years, 259 days)	Died in office	
5	Angel Lagdameo	May 9, 2000 – February 14, 2018 (17 years, 281 days)	Retired	
6	Jose Romeo O. Lazo	April 17, 2018 – February 2, 2025 (6 years, 291 days)	Retired	
7	Midyphil B. Billones	April 2, 2025 – present (1 year, 134 days)		

== Affiliated bishops ==
Living

- Midyphil B. Billones (archbishop: February 2, 2025 – present)
- Jose Romeo O. Lazo (archbishop: February 14, 2018 – February 2, 2025)
- Jose Serofia Palma (priest: August 21, 1976 – November 28, 1997)
- Emmanuel Celeste Trance (priest: May 17, 1978 – May 14, 2004)
- Gerardo Alimane Alminaza (former auxiliary bishop: May 29, 2008 – September 14, 2013)

Deceased

- Fernando R. Capalla (priest: March 18, 1961 – April 2, 1975)
- Leandro Arrúe Agudo (bishop: March 27, 1885 – October 24, 1897)
- Teofilo Bastida Camomot (auxiliary bishop: March 23, 1955 – June 10, 1958)
- Artemio G. Casas (archbishop: May 11, 1974 – 25 October 25, 1985)
- Mariano Cuartero y Medina (bishop: September 20, 1867 – July 16, 1884)
- José María Cuenco (auxiliary bishop: November 22, 1941; bishop: November 24, 1945; archbishop: June 29, 1951 – October 8, 1972)
- Dennis Joseph Dougherty (bishop: April 19, 1908 – December 6, 1915)
- Andrés Ferrero y Malo de San José (bishop: March 24, 1898 – October 27, 1903)
- Maurice Patrick Foley (bishop: September 6, 1916 – August 7, 1919)
- James Paul McCloskey (bishop: March 8, 1920 – April 10, 1945)
- Juan Nicolasora Nilmar (auxiliary bishop: February 20, 1959 – January 3, 1967)
- Alberto Jover Piamonte (priest: March 22, 1958; Auxiliary Bishop: December 28, 1974; archbishop: April 2, 1986 – December 17, 1998)
- Frederick Zadok Rooker (bishop: June 12, 1903 – September 20, 1907)
- Jaime Lachica Sin (priest: April 3, 1954; auxiliary bishop: February 10, 1967; coadjutor archbishop: January 15, 1972; archbishop: October 8, 1972 – January 21, 1974)
- Angel N. Lagdameo (archbishop emeritus: March 11, 2000 – February 14, 2018)

== Suffragan dioceses and bishops ==
Diocese	Bishop	Period in office	Coat of arms
Bacolod (Negros Occidental)	Louie P. Galbines	August 11, 2026 – present (3 days)	
Kabankalan (Negros Occidental)	Sede vacante	Since May 14, 2026 (92 days)	
San Carlos (Negros Occidental)	Gerardo A. Alminaza	November 14, 2013 – present (12 years, 273 days)	
San Jose de Antique (Antique)	Marvyn A. Maceda	April 9, 2019 – present (7 years, 127 days)	

== See also ==
- Catholic Church in the Philippines
