= Jaro Cathedral =

Roman Catholic church in Iloilo City, Philippines

Jaro Metropolitan Cathedral
- National Shrine of the Our Lady of Candles
- Metropolitan Cathedral of Saint Elizabeth of Hungary
- Kalakhang Katedral ni Santa Isabel ng Unggaria at Pambansang Dambana ng Mahal na Birhen ng Candelaria (Filipino); Catedral Metropolitana de Santa Isabel de Hungría y Santuario Nacional de Nuestra Señora de la Candelaria (Spanish)
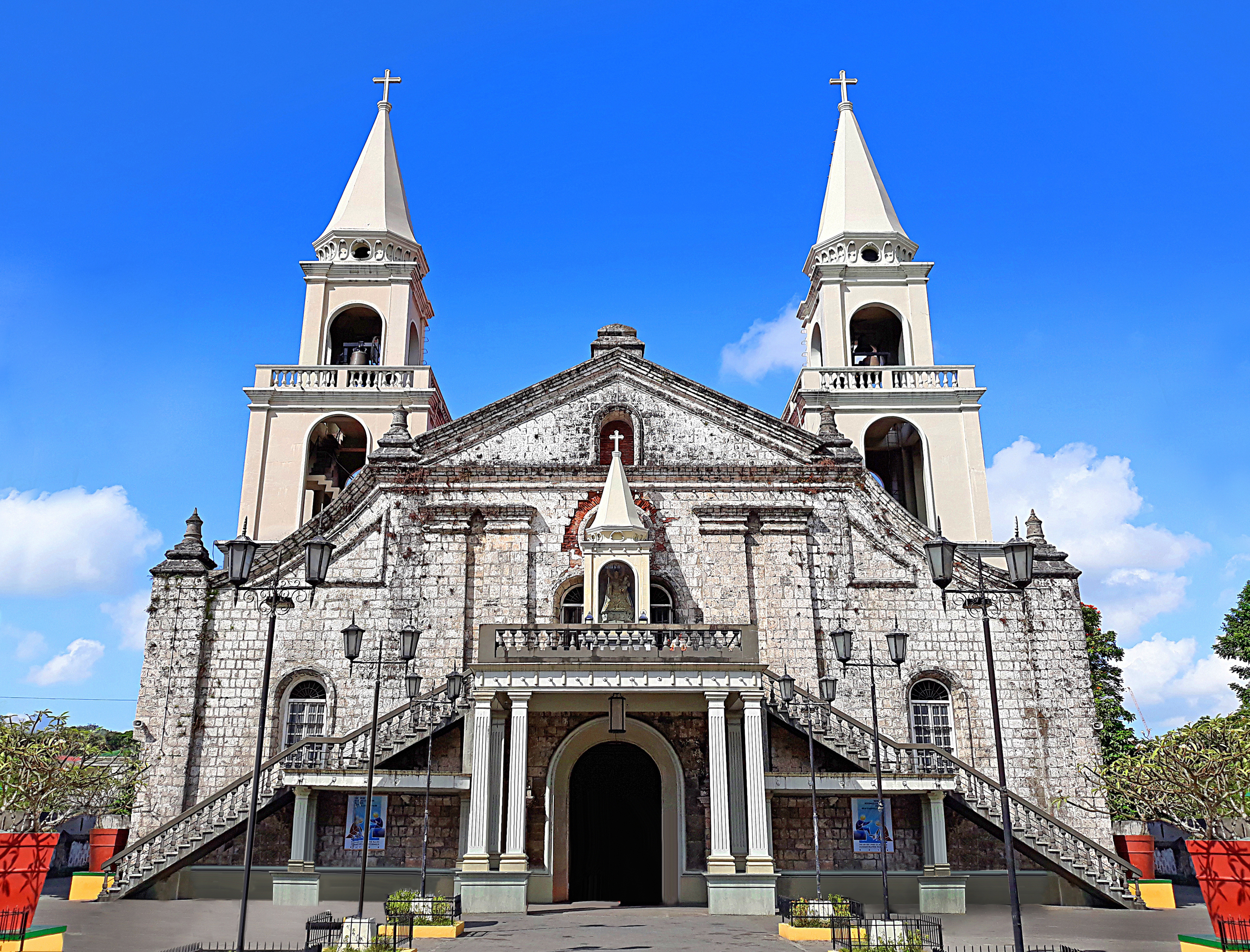
- Main façade with the stairs leading to the image of Our Lady of Candles

- Location in the Visayas Location in the Philippines
- 10°43′25″N 122°33′22″E
- Location: Jaro, Iloilo City
- Country: Philippines
- Language(s): Hiligaynon, English
- Denomination: Roman Catholic

History
- Status: Cathedral; National shrine
- Founded: March 3, 1575
- Dedication: Elizabeth of Hungary
- Dedicated: May 26, 1965
- Consecrated: February 2, 1874

Architecture
- Heritage designation: National Historical Landmark
- Designated: 1976
- Architectural type: Cathedral
- Style: Romanesque Revival
- Groundbreaking: February 22, 1869
- Completed: February 2, 1874, May 26, 1965

Specifications
- Length: 71.8 m (236 ft)
- Width: 28.7 m (94 ft)

Administration
- Archdiocese: Jaro
- Deanery: Saint Peter

Clergy
- Archbishop: Most Rev. Midyphil B. Billones, D.D.
- Rector: Rev. Fr. Jose Alberto Guillen, VF

The Jaro Metropolitan Cathedral, also known as the National Shrine of the Our Lady of Candles, Metropolitan Cathedral of Saint Elizabeth of Hungary, and colloquially as Jaro Cathedral (Hiligaynon: Katedral sang Jaro), is a cathedral and national shrine located in the district of Jaro in Iloilo City, on the island of Panay in the Philippines. The seat of the Roman Catholic Archdiocese of Jaro, it was placed under the patronage of Saint Elizabeth of Hungary. It was established in 1575 as a visita (chapel-of-ease) of Oton by the Augustinians and as a separate parish in 1587. The present-day structure of Jaro Cathedral was built in 1874.

The Catholic Bishops' Conference of the Philippines formally declared the cathedral the National Shrine of Our Lady of Candles (Nuestra Señora de la Candelaria) in 2012. The cathedral is the fourth national shrine in the Visayas and Mindanao, after the Basilica del Santo Niño in Cebu (1965), Mandaue Church (2001), and Virgen de la Regla Church in Lapu-Lapu City (2007). Likewise, it is also the second Marian-dedicated national shrine in Visayas and Mindanao, and the first in Western Visayas.

The distinct and notable feature of the cathedral is its main belfry (Campanario de Jaro) separated across the church's structure in Plaza Jaro.

The image of Nuestra Señora de la Candelaria (Candelaria) perched atop the façade of the cathedral, is the first Marian image canonically crowned in person by a Pope and Saint (John Paul II) in the Philippines and in Asia. Also, through the said canonical crowning event, the Nuestra Señora de la Candelaria has been declared as the official Roman Catholic patron of Western Visayas (including the Negros Occidental province) and Romblon, and made known Jaro as the 'Center of Candelaria devotion in the Philippine islands'.

== History ==
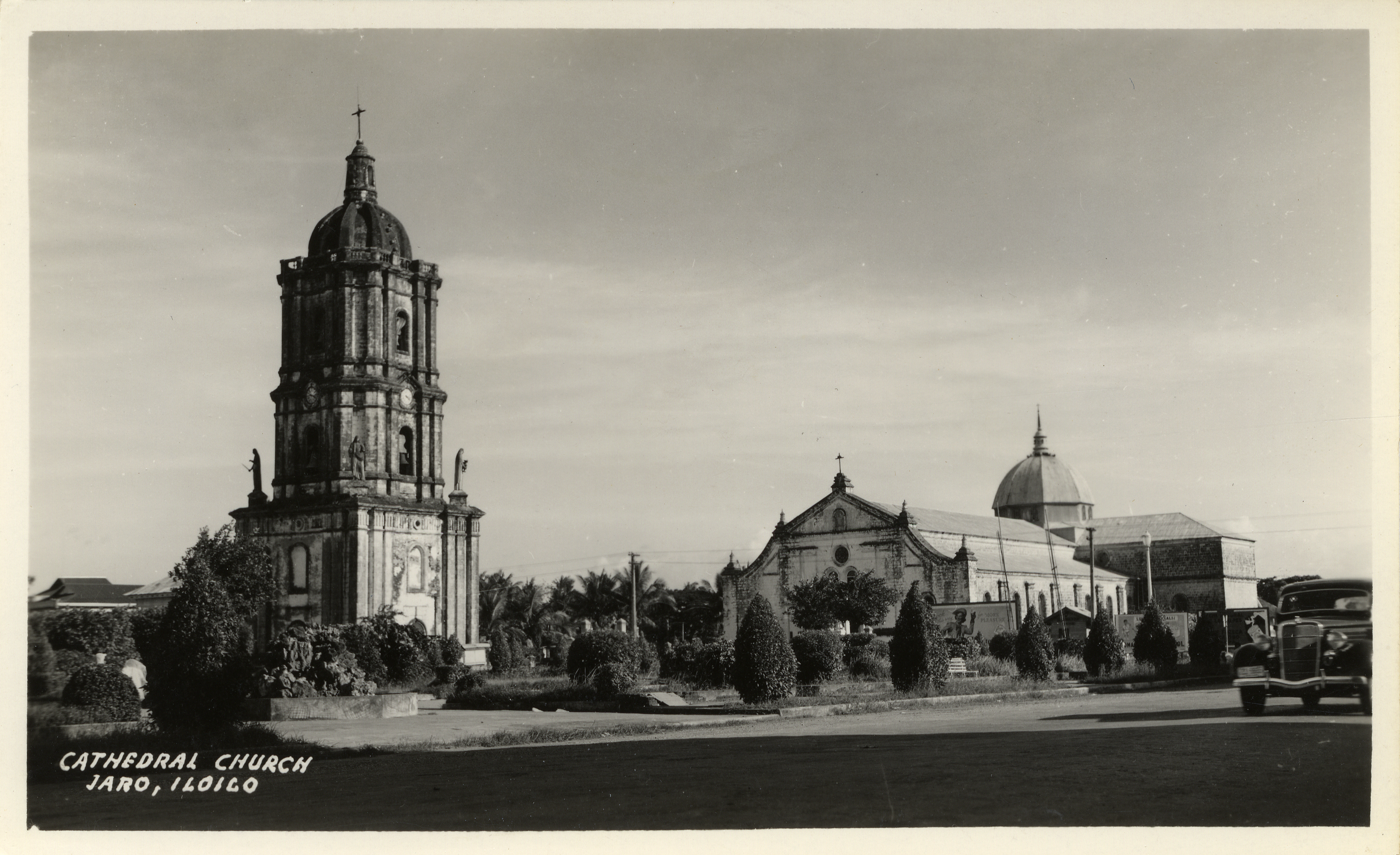
The church and the Jaro Belfry as pictured in the 1920s or 1940s

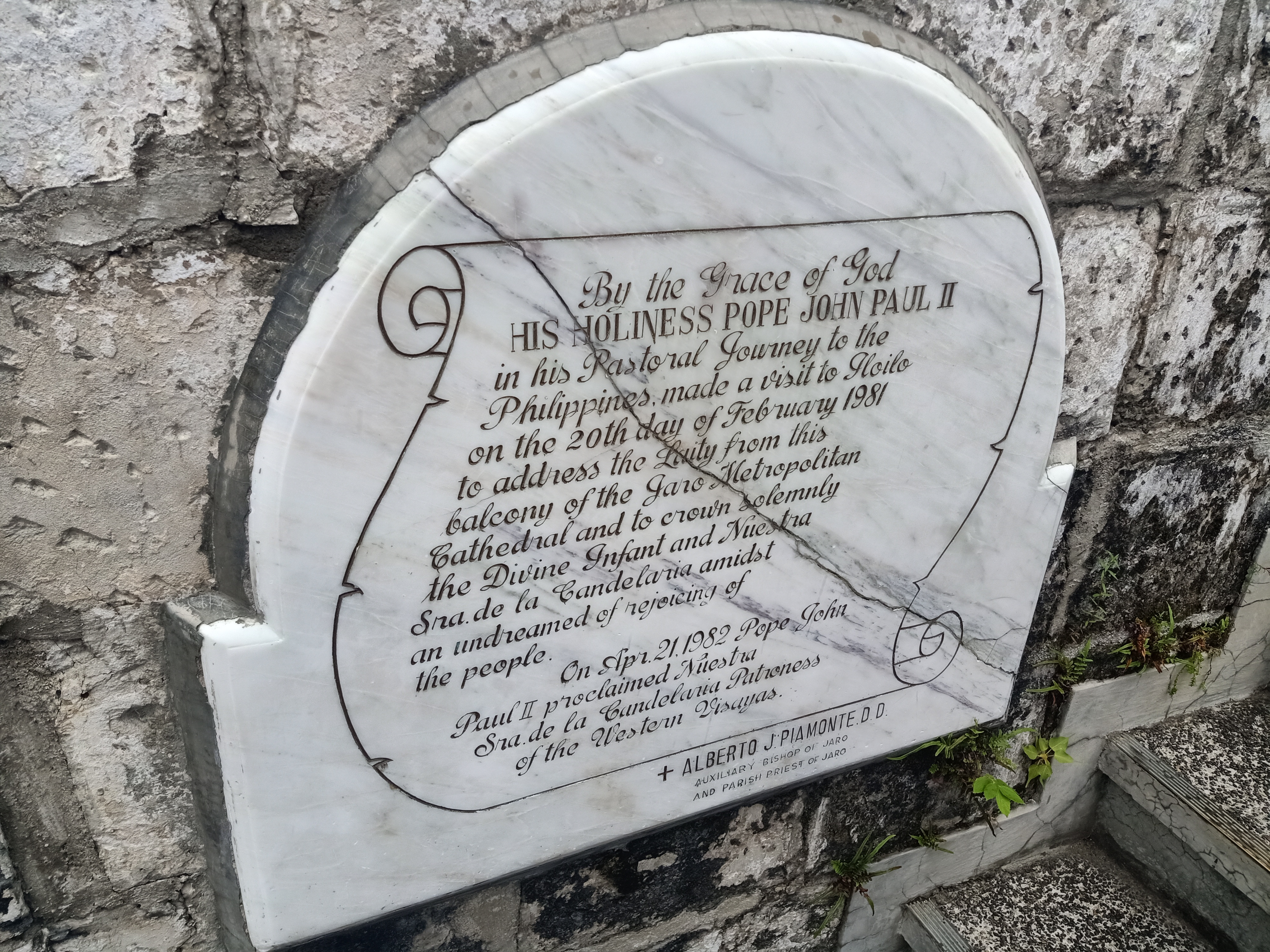
Marker commemorating the February 1981 visit of Pope John Paul II, as well as the canonical coronation of the Our Lady of Candles image

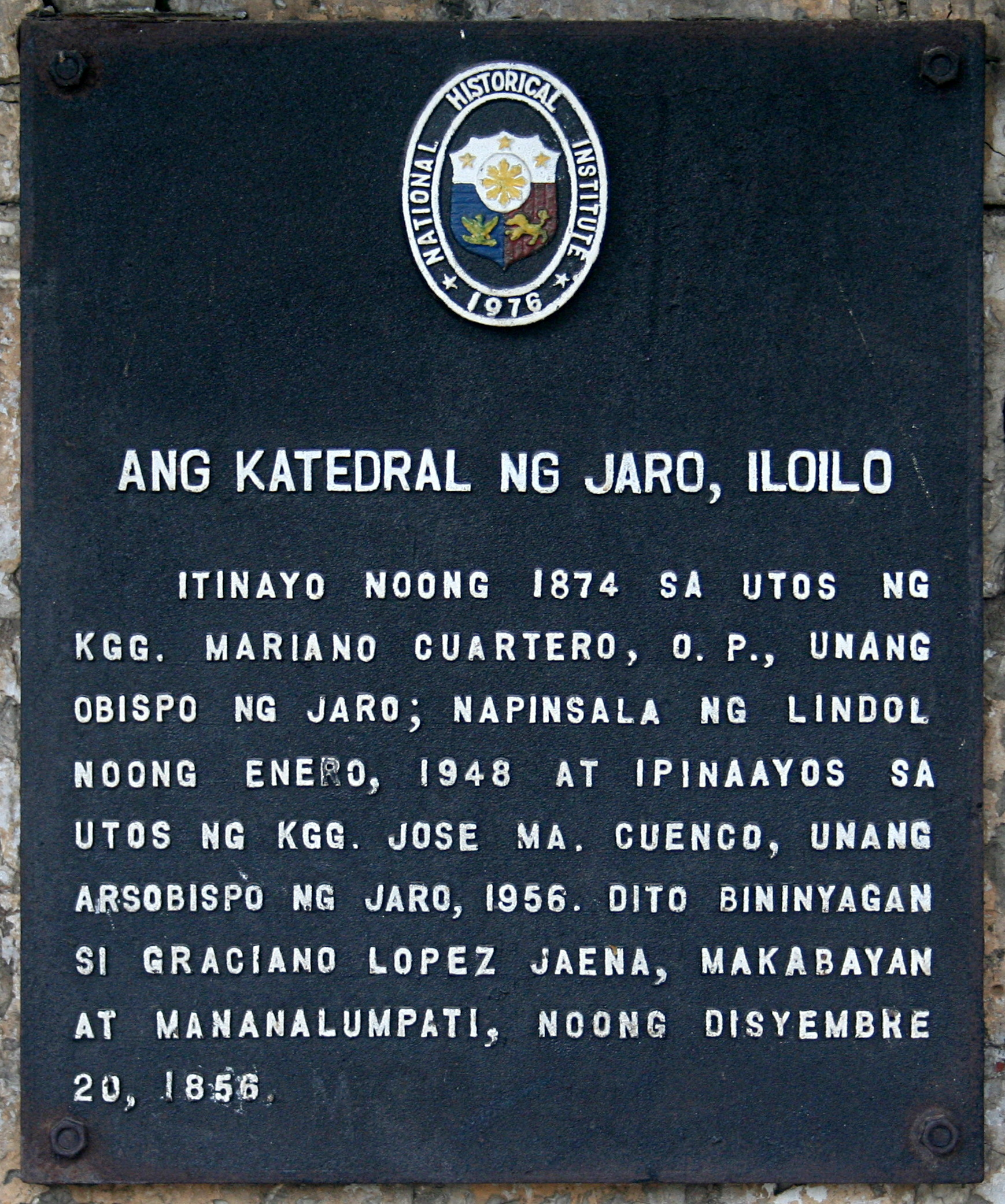
The cathedral's NHI marker installed in 1976.

Jaro Cathedral was first established as a visita (chapel-of-ease) of Oton on March 3, 1575, and later became a visita of Arevalo in 1584. It later became a parish in April 1587 under the advocation of Our Lady of the Nativity.

In 1636, the población was transferred from Alanga to its present location for favorable weather and protection from Moro attacks. On October 31 of the same year, the patron was changed to Nuestra Señora de la Candelaria.

After a century, plans for building a stone church were put in place by Fr. Juan Aguado. The first stone church was constructed from 1742 to 1744. The church was damaged by two earthquakes in 1787 and in the 19th century. Instead of reconstructing the church, it was built on a new site. The construction of the current cathedral structure was initiated by the first Bishop of Jaro, Mariano Cuartero, O.P. Construction began on February 22, 1869, and was consecrated in January–February 1874. It was destroyed by the January 1948 Lady Caycay earthquake and later repaired in 1956 by the first Archbishop of Jaro, José María Cuenco.

The Marian image of Our Lady of Candles also has the distinction of being canonically crowned personally by Pope John Paul II during his visit to Iloilo City on February 21, 1981, making it as the only Marian figure to be given such stature in the Philippines.

The National Historical Institute of the Philippines declared the Jaro Cathedral a historical landmark in 1976.

In January 2012, the Catholic Bishops' Conference of the Philippines approved the cathedral as the National Shrine of Our Lady of Candles, the second Marian-dedicated church or cathedral (1st National Shrine in Western Visayas) to receive such status in Visayas and Mindanao. It was declared as such on February 2 of the same year.

== Architecture ==
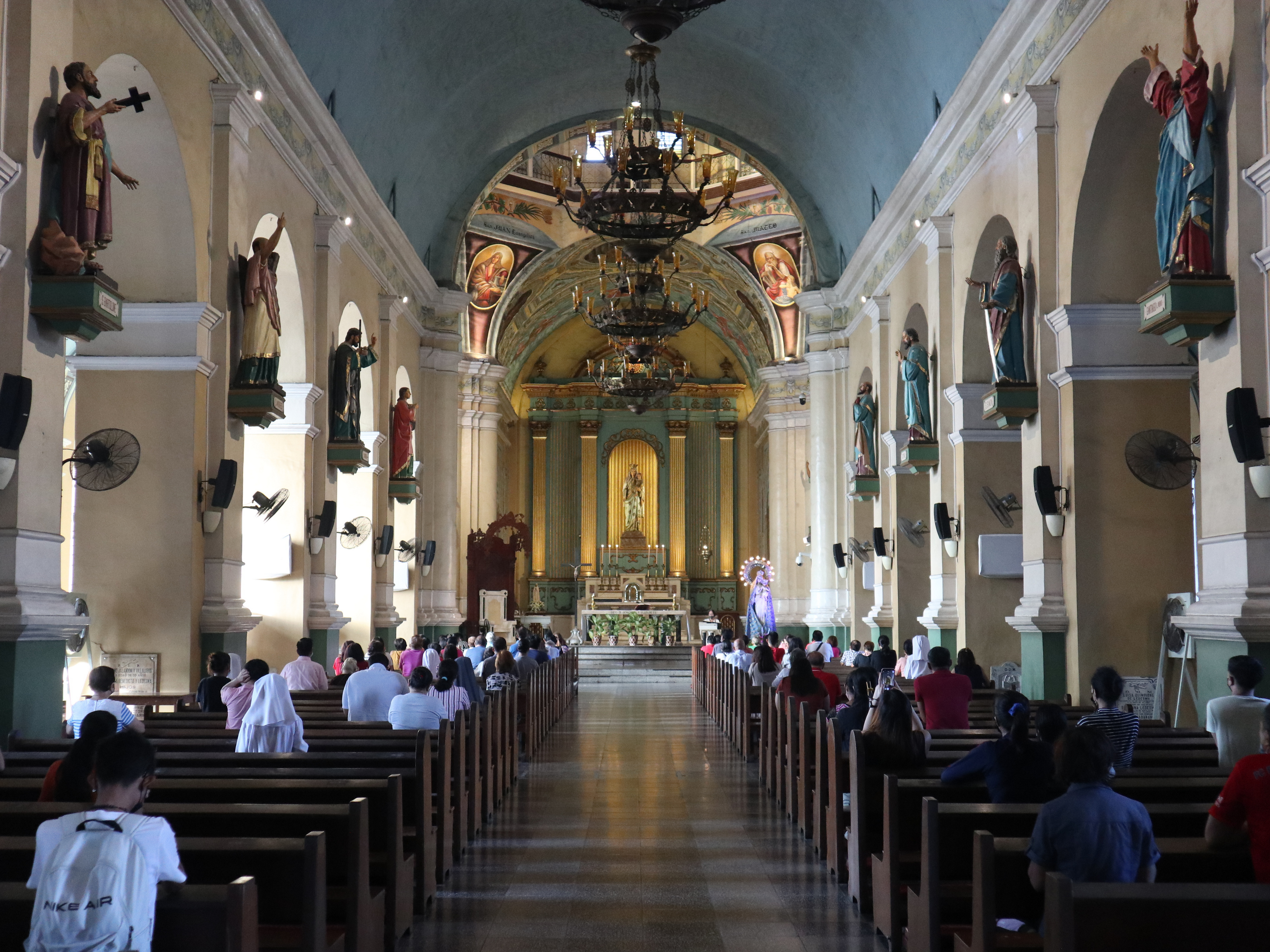
Central nave in 2022

The shrine is constructed in the Romanesque Revival style, deviating from semi-circular arches. A distinctive feature is that the bell tower, Jaro Belfry, is located across a busy street from the church, on Jaro Plaza, resembling Ilocos churches. Typically, belfries are built next to their churches. In this case, the tower was adjacent to an earlier church, but an earthquake destroyed the church and left the tower. Another distinctive feature is the stairs attached to the front façade of the cathedral, over the main entrance, leading up to a shrine featuring a statue of Our Lady of Candles. The church also possesses relics of St. Josemaría Escrivá.

Another feature of the church is its all-male ensemble of saints placed on the main pillars, with the exception of the Virgin Mary's icon. The arrangement is in response to Molo Church's all-female theme.

On the cathedral grounds are several archdiocesan and parish offices, and a perpetual adoration chapel. About a block away is the archdiocesan seminary, St. Vincent Ferrer Seminary, and across the plaza is the archbishop's palace.

== Notable events ==
- Our Lady of Candles canonical crowning - During the apostolic visit of Pope John Paul II in the Philippines in February 1981, he crowned the image of the Our Lady of Candles, the first and only Marian image to receive such honor without a papal legate in the Philippines and Asia. Such event elevated the status of Candelaria as the patroness of Western Visayas and Jaro Cathedral as center of Candelaria devotion in the Philippine islands.
- Baptisms of notable people - national hero, journalist, and co-founder of the Propaganda Movement, Graciano Lopez Jaena, who was born in Jaro was baptized on December 20, 1856, in Jaro Cathedral. Ilonggo senator Grace Poe, a foundling herself, was found and baptized in Jaro Cathedral.

== Gallery ==
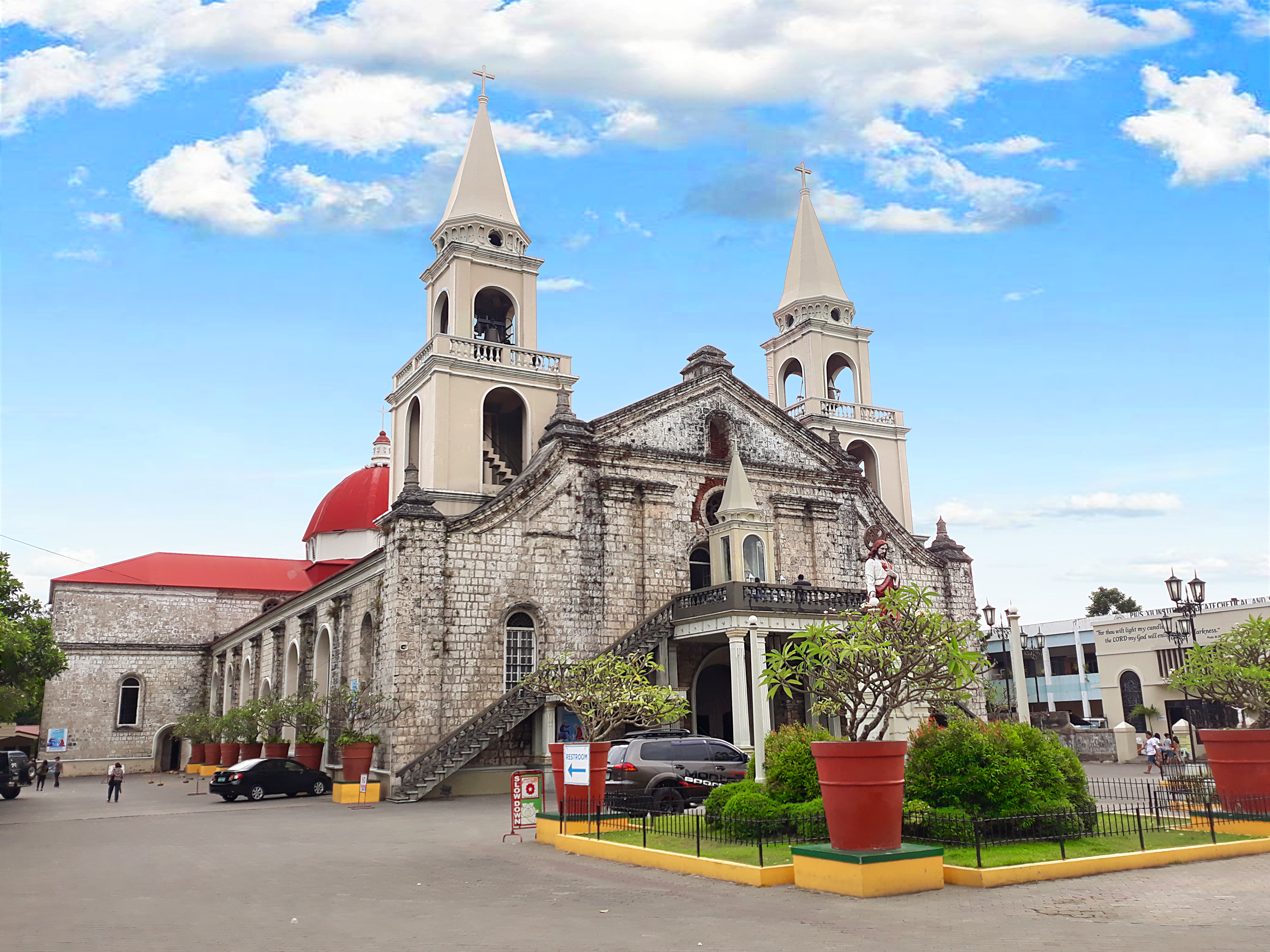
Northeast façade

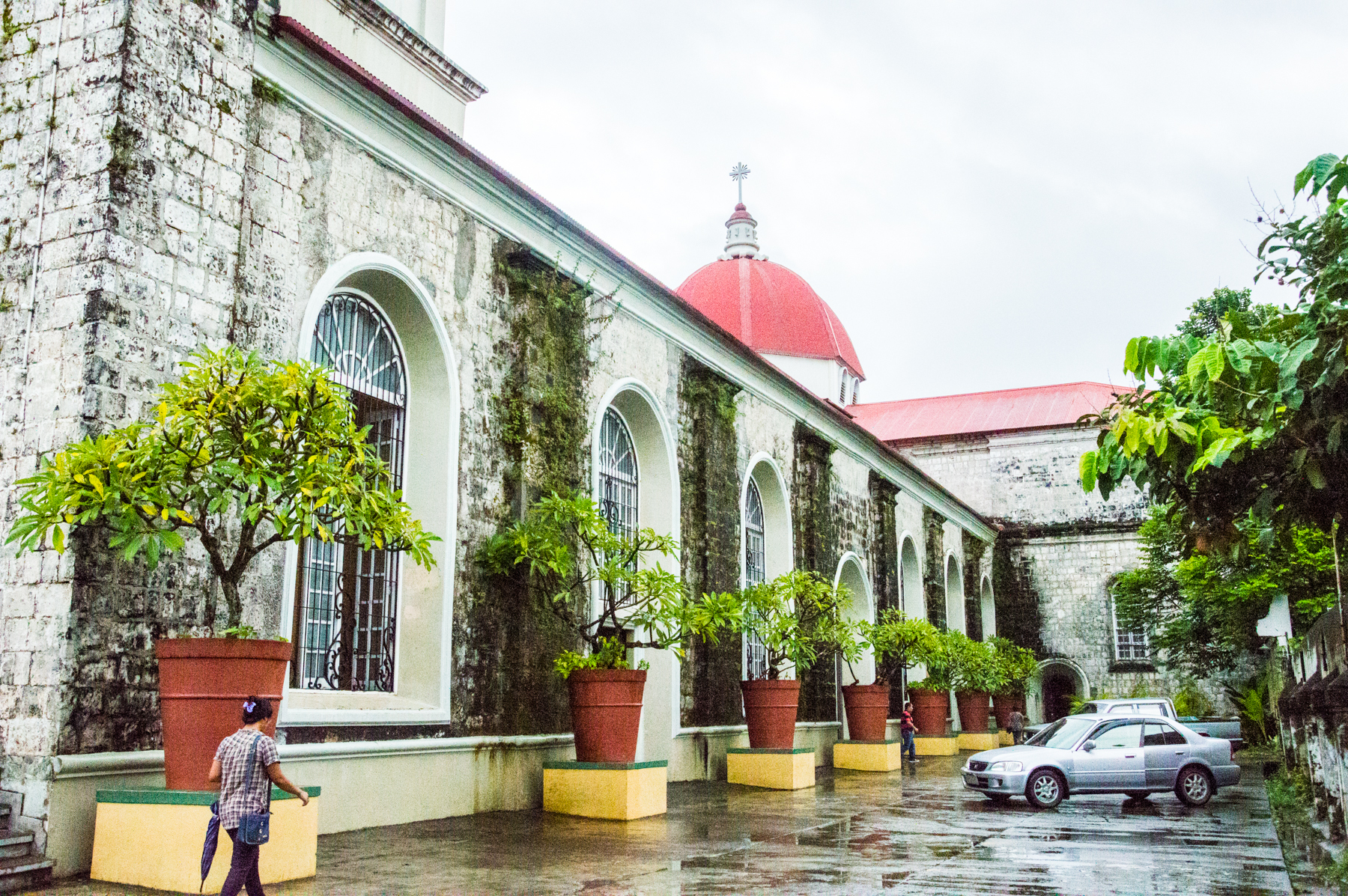
Northern flank

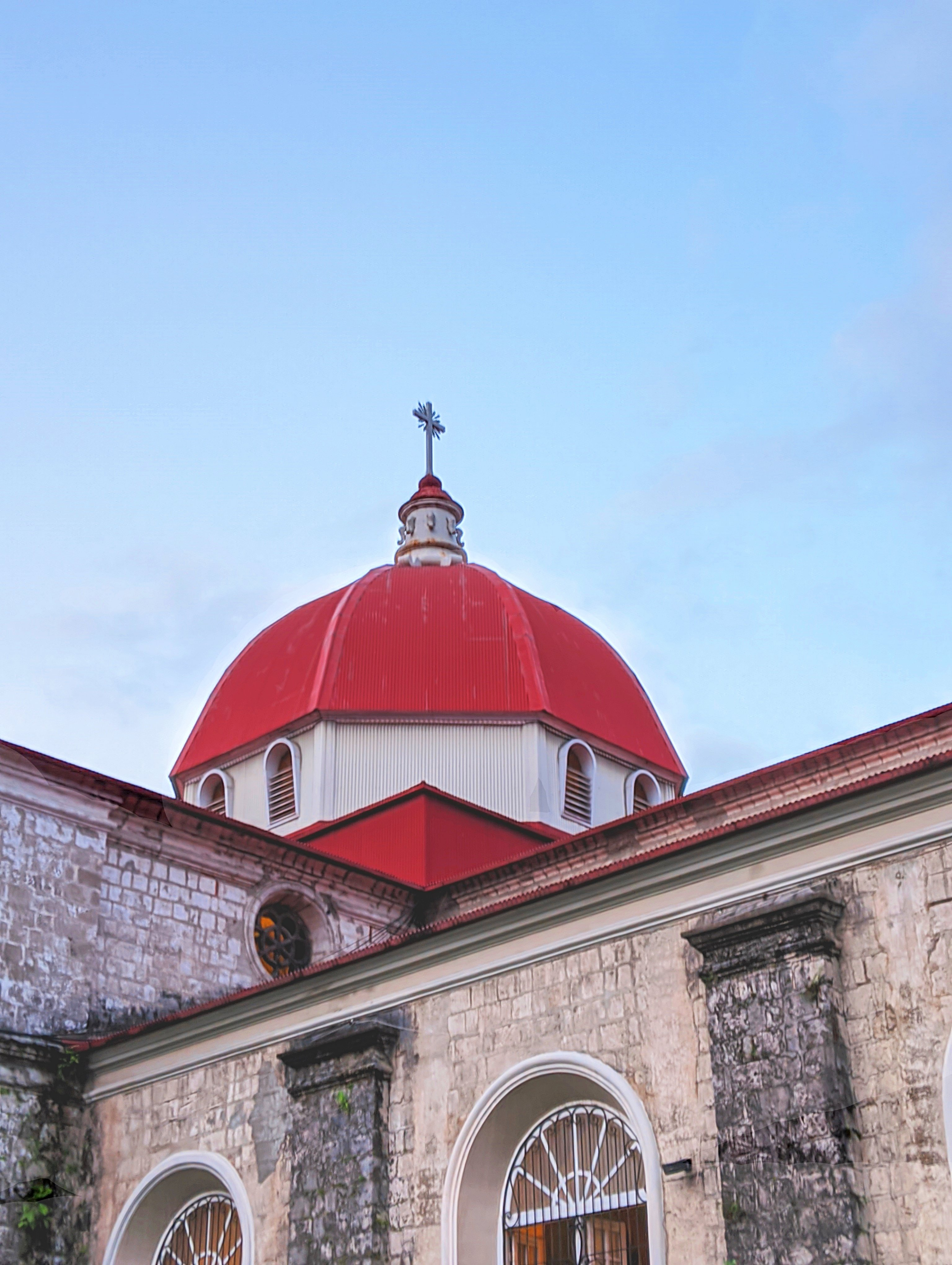
Dome

Chapel of Lights (Capilla de Luces)

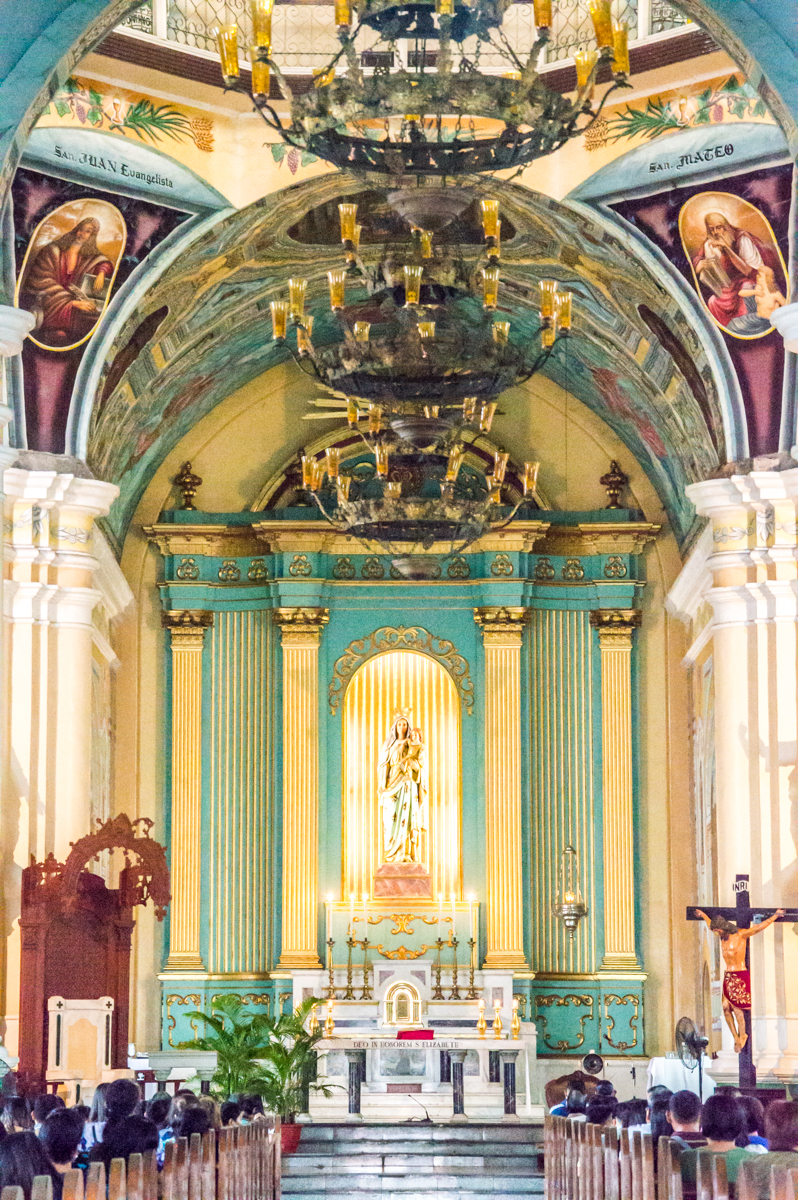
Main high altar

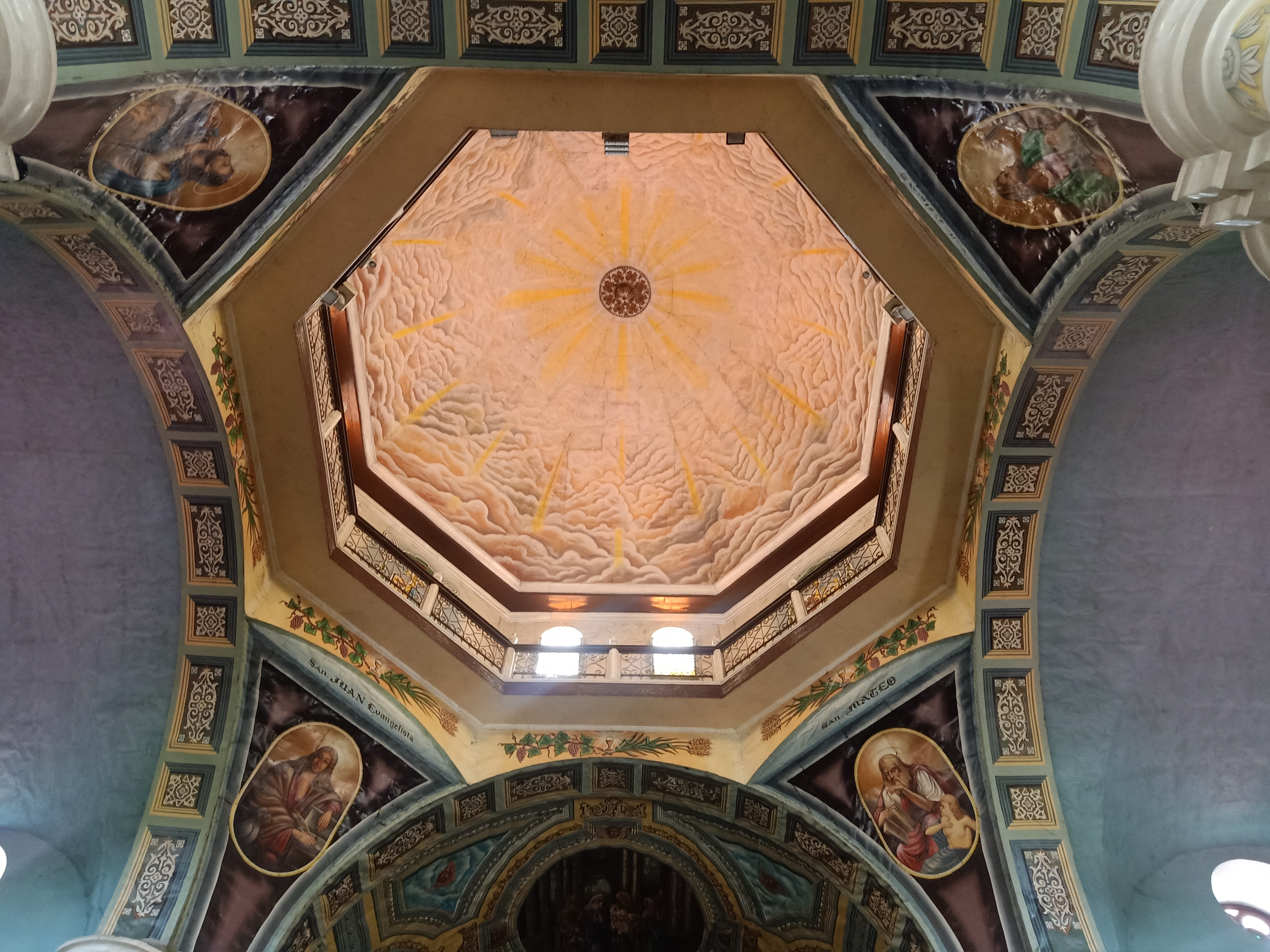
Dome interior

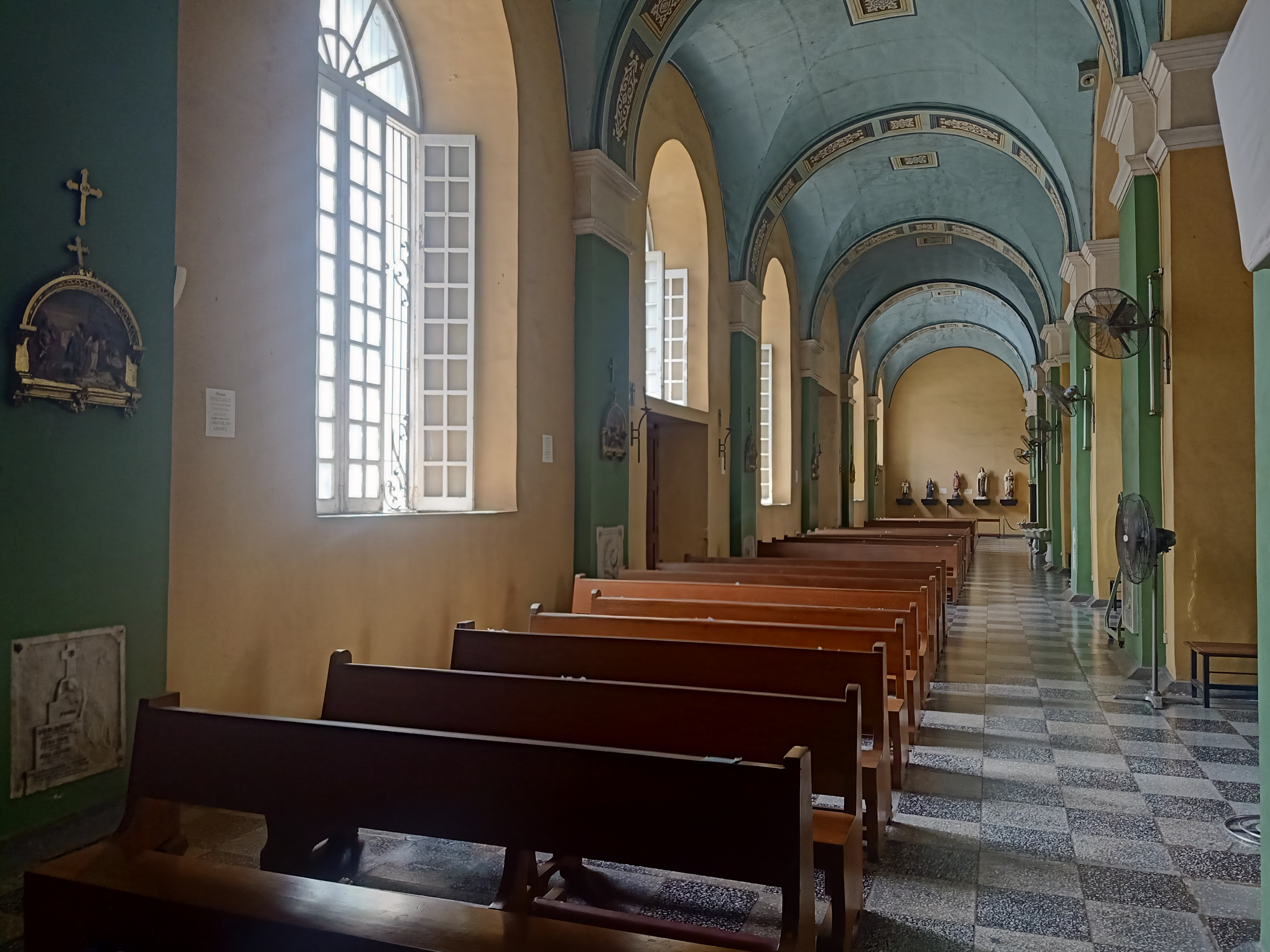
Seats at the right side nave

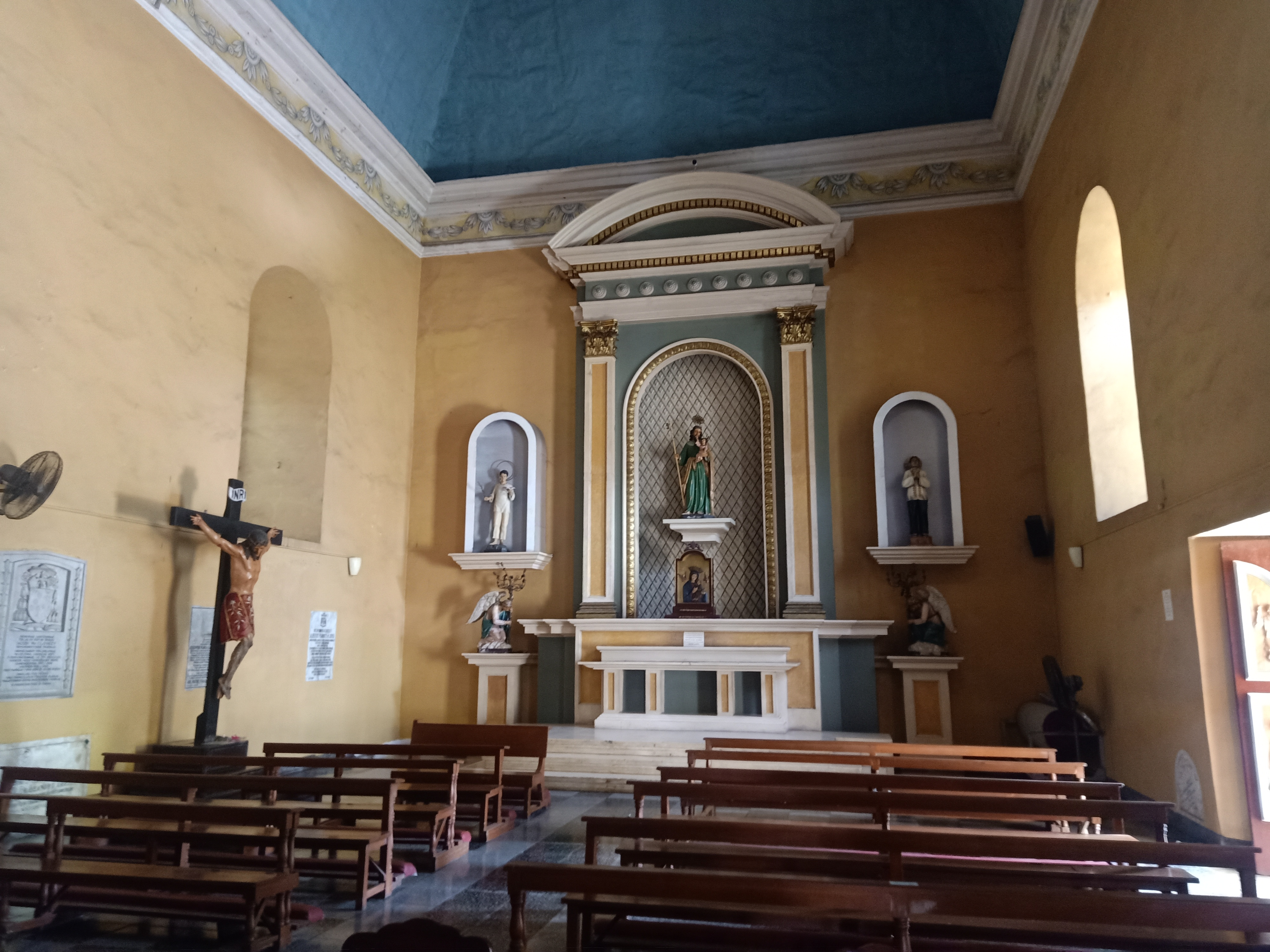
One of the cathedral's side altars

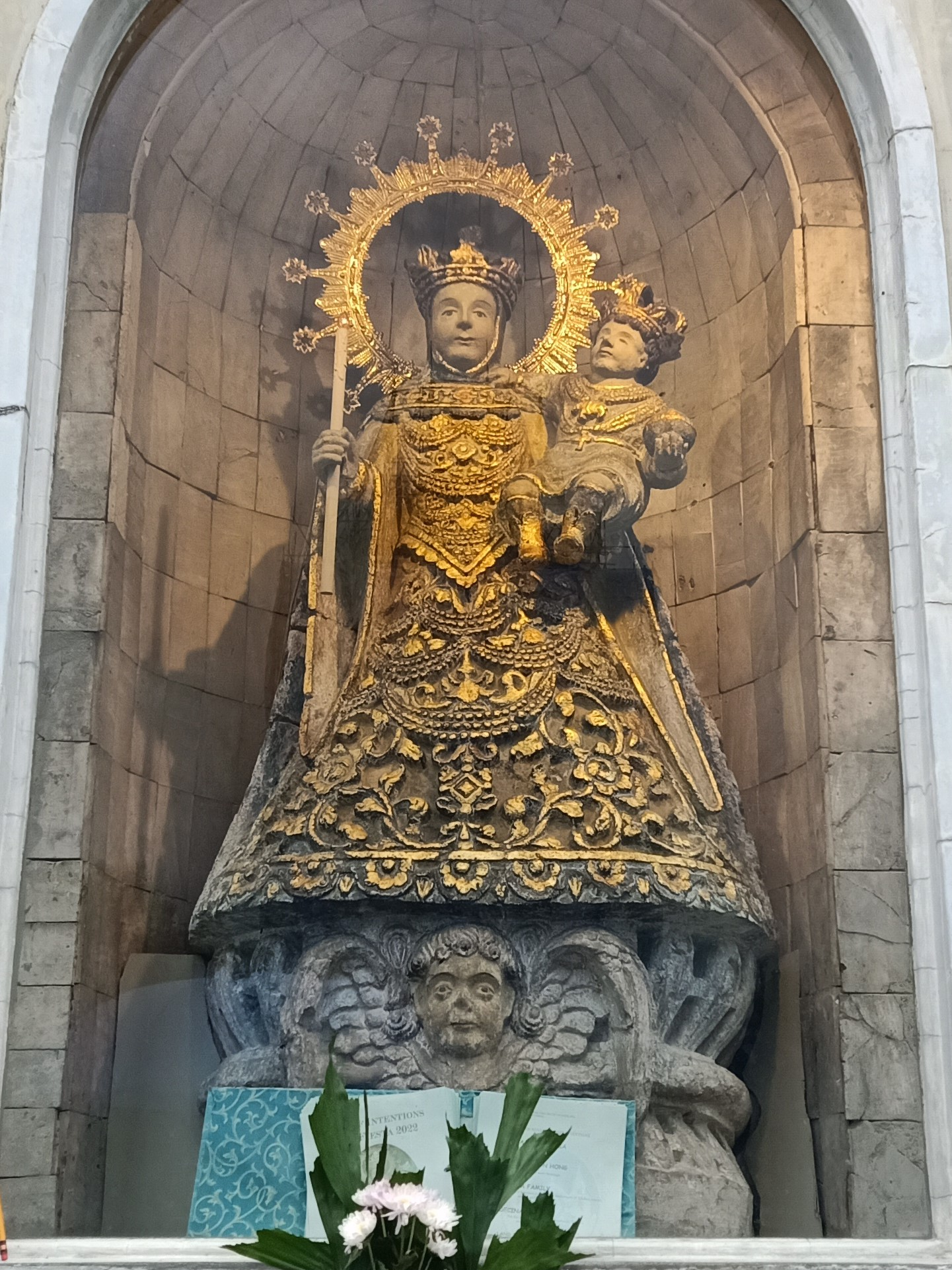
Encased image of the Our Lady of Candles, patron of Western Visayas

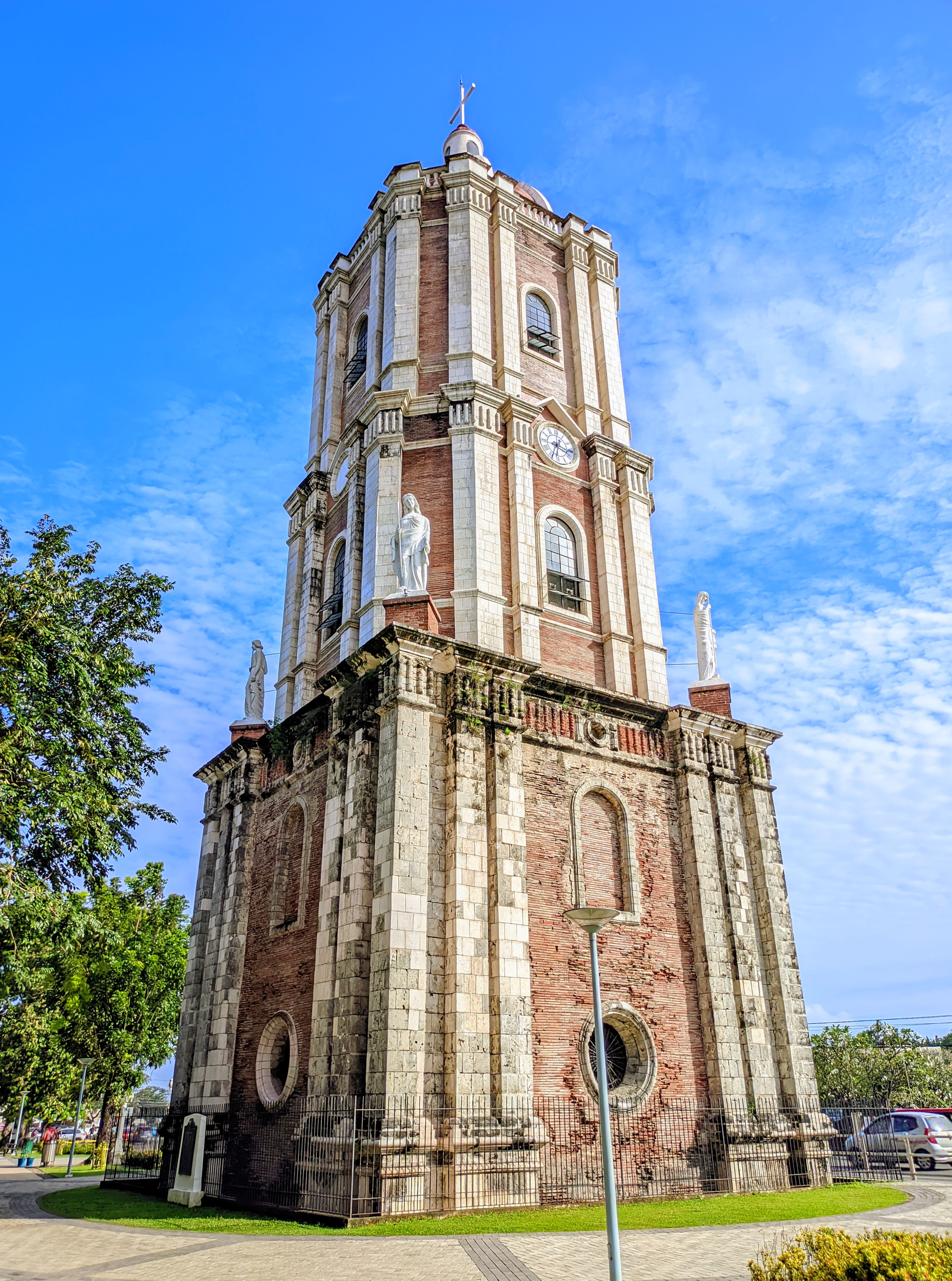
The detached Jaro Belfry

== See also ==
- Jaro Belfry
- Crowned Marian images in the Philippines
