= José María Cuenco =

Filipino prelate of the Catholic Church (1885–1972)

The Most Reverend José María Diosomito Cuenco D.D.
- Archbishop of Jaro
- Church: Catholic
- Archdiocese: Jaro
- Appointed: November 24, 1945 (Note: Cuenco was originally not appointed as archbishop of Jaro, but rather as bishop, because, in 1945, Jaro was just a diocese. When, in 1951, the diocese was elevated by Pope Pius XII to an archdiocese, Cuenco was concomitantly appointed as archbishop. So, while he was the Ordinary of Jaro for the entire time from his appointment in 1945 until his death in 1972, that period is, technically, divided between his term as bishop (1945–1951) and as archbishop (1951–1972).)
- Term ended: October 8, 1972
- Predecessor: James Paul McCloskey
- Successor: Jaime Lachica Sin
- Other post: Bishop of Jaro (1945‍–‍1951)
- Previous posts: Titular bishop of Hemeria (1941–1945); Auxiliary bishop of Jaro (1941–1945); Vicar general of Cebu (1925)

Personal details
- Born: José María Diosomito Cuenco; May 19, 1885 Carmen, Cebu, Philippine Islands, Spanish Empire
- Died: October 7, 1972 (aged 87) Iloilo City, Philippines
- Buried: Metropolitan Cathedral of Jaro
- Education: Colegio de San Juan de Letran; Colegio-Seminario de San Carlos (AB); Santa Clara University (MA); Georgetown University (PhD, LlB); Seminario Mayor de San Carlos
- Motto: Quid Retribuam Domino (Latin for 'How Can I Repay the Lord')
- Coat of arms: José María Diosomito Cuenco's coat of arms

Ordination history
History
Priestly ordination
- Ordained by: Juan Bautista Gorordo
- Date: June 11, 1914
Episcopal consecration
- Principal consecrator: Guglielmo Piani
- Co-consecrators: Cesar Maria Guerrero, Mariano Aspiras Madriaga
- Date: December 27, 1942
Episcopal succession
Bishops consecrated by José Maria Diosomito Cuenco as principal consecrator
- Antonio Floro Frondosa: May 28, 1952

José María Cuenco D.D. (May 19, 1885 – October 8, 1972) was a Filipino prelate of the Catholic Church and was the first archbishop of the Archdiocese of Jaro in the Philippines.

== Early life ==
Archbishop Cuenco was born on May 19, 1885, in Carmen, Cebu, Philippines. (Note: When Cuenco was born the Philippines was the Captaincy General of the Philippines of the Spanish Empire) He was the eldest child of Mariano Albao Cuenco and Remedios Diosomito. His father, a journalist and Clerk of Court, died in 1909. His mother largely raised Jose's 15 sisters and brothers, among them, Mariano Jesús and Miguel, who became a senator and congressman respectively. The Cuenco family were involved with printing and publishing as newspaper publishers and owners of Imprenta Rosario, one of Cebu's early print shops.

== Education ==
In 1896, Cuenco graduated from the Colegio de San Juan de Letran, Manila. Then, he studied at the Colegio-Seminario de San Carlos in Cebu, garnering a Bachelor of Arts in 1903. He then went to the United States, received his Pre-Law at the Santa Clara University in 1904, and studied at Georgetown University, where he received his Licentiate in Philosophy and Letters in 1904, and his Doctorate in Philosophy and Bachelor of Arts in 1905. He then returned to the Philippines and initially taught at Cebu Provincial High School, before entering the Seminario Mayor de San Carlos in Cebu City in 1909 to study priesthood. He was ordained priest for the Diocese of Cebu on June 11, 1914.

== Early Pastoral Ministry ==
Cuenco had a distinguished career as a churchman. As a young priest, he was the founder-editor of the Cebu Catholic newspaper El Boletin Catolico (1915–1930), continuing the work of his own father who was publisher-editor of the pioneering Catholic newspaper in Cebu, Ang Camatuoran (1902–1911). In 1917, he was appointed by Bishop Juan Gorordo as Chancellor-Secretary and became Vicar General in 1925. In 1931, during the sede vacante of the Diocese of Cebu, he was appointed by Apostolic Delegate Guglielmo Piani as Vicar Delegate. Upon the accession of Archbishop Gabriel Reyes as prelate of Cebu, he was reappointed Vicar General, and on the same year, was appointed by Pope Pius XI as Domestic Prelate. In 1933, he became the first parish priest of Cebu City's Santo Rosario Parish, serving until he was appointed to the episcopacy.

== Episcopacy ==
In 1941, he was appointed by Pope Pius XII as Titular Bishop of Hemeria and Auxiliary Bishop of Jaro. However, due to the outbreak of World War II, he was consecrated bishop on December 27, 1942, with Archbishop Piani as his principal consecrator, and Bishops Cesar Ma. Guerrero and Mariano Madriaga as co-consecrators. Following the death of Jaro Bishop James McCloskey, he became the Bishop of Jaro, and upon its promotion to Archdiocese in 1951, he became its first Archbishop.

He served as Archbishop of Jaro until his death on October 8, 1972.

== Works ==
He authored and published close to a dozen books, mostly narratives of his travels and experiences, including Archbishop Cuenco: Autobiography (Iloilo: La Editorial, 1972), which came out shortly before he died.

== Notes ==
Catholic Church titles
Preceded by Paul Justin Cawet	— TITULAR — Bishop of Hemeria; December 27, 1942 – November 24, 1945	Succeeded by Alfredo Vicente Scherer
Preceded by James Paul McCloskey	Bishop of Jaro; November 24, 1945 – June 29, 1951	Succeeded by Himself as Archbishop of Jaro
Preceded by Himself as Bishop of Jaro	Archbishop of Jaro; June 29, 1951 – October 8, 1972	Succeeded by Jaime Lachica Sin
