= Kabankalan =

Component city in Negros Occidental, Philippines

Kabankalan Cabancalán
- Component city
- City of Kabankalan
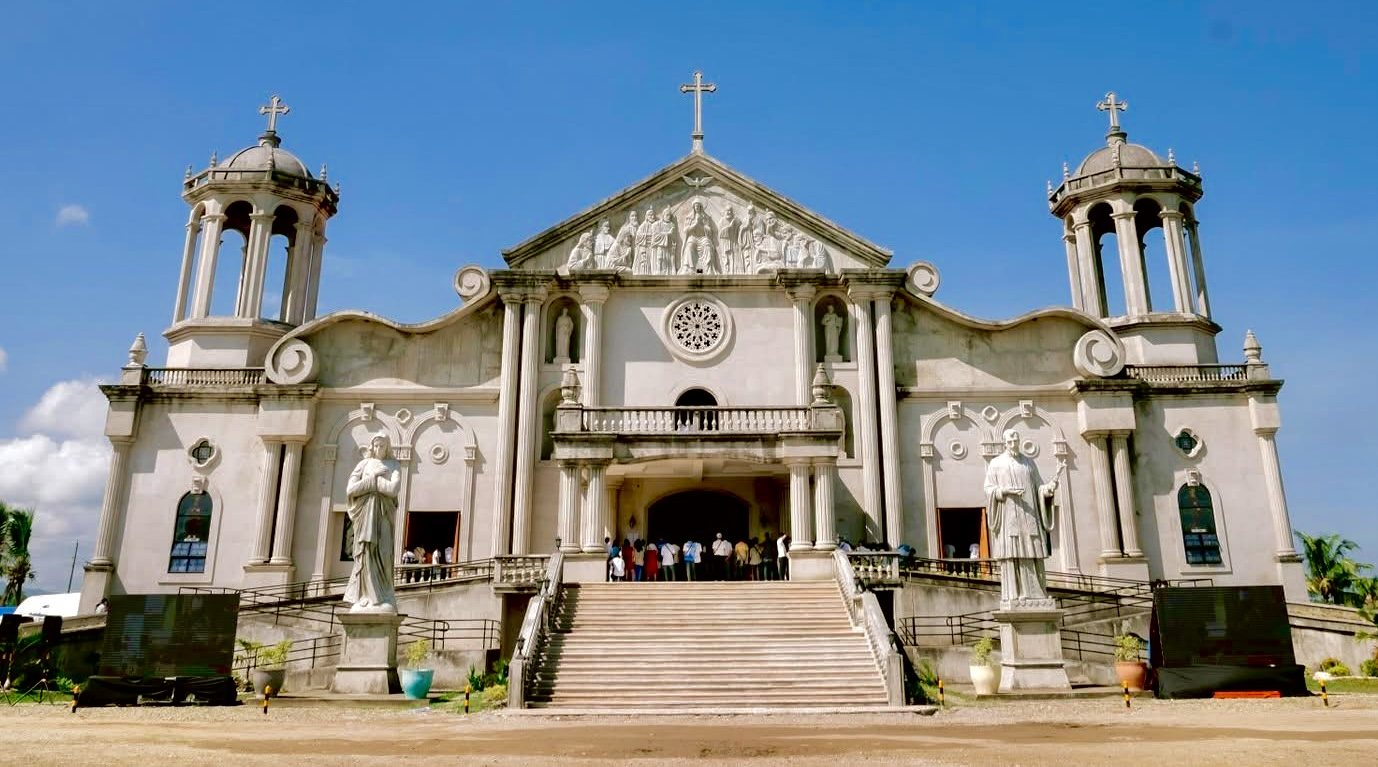
- Kabankalan Cathedral

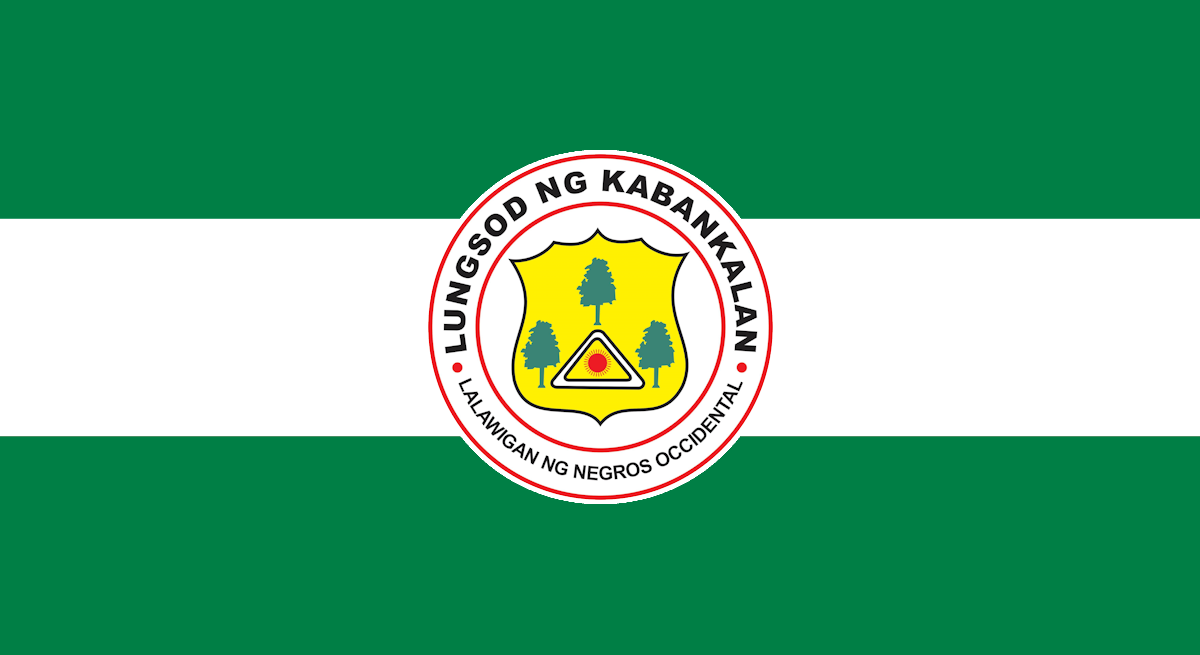
- Flag Seal
- Nickname: The Rising City of the South
- Anthem: "Kabankalan, Halandumon nga Siyudad"
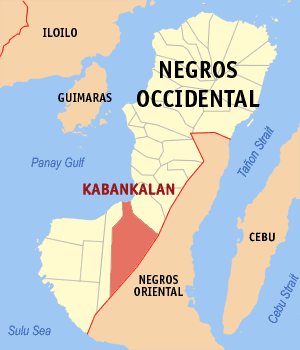
- Map of Negros Occidental with Kabankalan highlighted
- Interactive map of Kabankalan
- Location within the Philippines
- Coordinates: 9°59′N 122°49′E
- Country: Philippines
- Region: Negros Island Region
- Province: Negros Occidental
- District: 6th district
- Founded: March 14, 1907
- Cityhood: August 2, 1997
- Named for: Nauclea orientalis (locally called Bangkal)
- Barangays: 32 (see Barangays)

Government
  - Type: Sangguniang Panlungsod
  - Mayor: Benjie M. Miranda
  - Vice Mayor: Divina Gracia S. Miranda (PFP)
  - Representative: Mercedes Alvarez (NPC)
  - City Council: Members: Anne Marie N. Zayco; Joan Daclan-Cagape; Joestarr B. Bandojo; Helen Q. Ibañez; Jerzy M. Guanzon; Marie Vic Anacan-Ramos; Adolfo T. Mangao, Jr.; John T. Antolo; Macario Z. Zafra III; Jose M. Dumaguete; Rico M. Regalia ^{‡}; Ernie J. Libona ^{◌}; ‡ ex officio ABC president; ◌ ex officio SK chairman
  - Electorate: 110,588 voters (2025)

Area
  - Total: 697.35 km^{2} (269.25 sq mi)
- Elevation: 228 m (748 ft)
- Highest elevation: 1,455 m (4,774 ft)
- Lowest elevation: 0 m (0 ft)

Population (2024 census)
  - Total: 210,893
  - Density: 302.42/km^{2} (783.27/sq mi)
  - Households: 45,285

Economy
  - Income class: 1st city income class
  - Poverty incidence: 28.01% (2023)
  - Revenue: ₱ 2,023 million (2024)
  - Assets: ₱ 7,703 million (2024)
  - Expenditure: ₱ 1,111 million (2024)
  - Liabilities: ₱ 1,211 million (2024)

Service provider
  - Electricity: Negros Occidental Electric Cooperative (NOCECO)
- Time zone: UTC+8 (PST)
- ZIP code: 6111
- PSGC: 064515000
- IDD : area code: +63 (0)34
- Native languages: Hiligaynon; Karolanos; Tagalog; Cebuano
- Website: www.kabankalancity.gov.ph

Kabankalan, officially the City of Kabankalan (Hiligaynon: Dakbanwa sang Kabankalan; Cebuano: Dakbayan sa Kabankalan; Filipino: Lungsod ng Kabankalan, Spanish: Ciudad de Cabancalán), is a component city in the province of Negros Occidental, Philippines. According to the 2024 census, it has a population of 210,893 people, making it the second most populous city in Negros Occidental next to Bacolod.

Kabankalan is currently applying for Highly Urbanized City (HUC) status. It ranks as the second-highest city in both gross and net income in Negros Occidental, following Bacolod.

The city hosts three major festivals: the Kabankalan Sinulog every third Sunday of January (celebrated together with Cebu City), Udyakan sa Kabankalan and the Charter Anniversary. Notable attractions include Mag-aso Falls and Balicaocao Resort. The city also hosts the main campus of the Central Philippines State University (CPSU).

In 2011, Kabankalan City received the “Best Performing City” award in Region VI during the Regional Search for Excellence in Local Governance (EXCEL). The award was presented at the Pagdayaw 2011 program held at the Iloilo Grand Hotel in December of that year.

== History ==
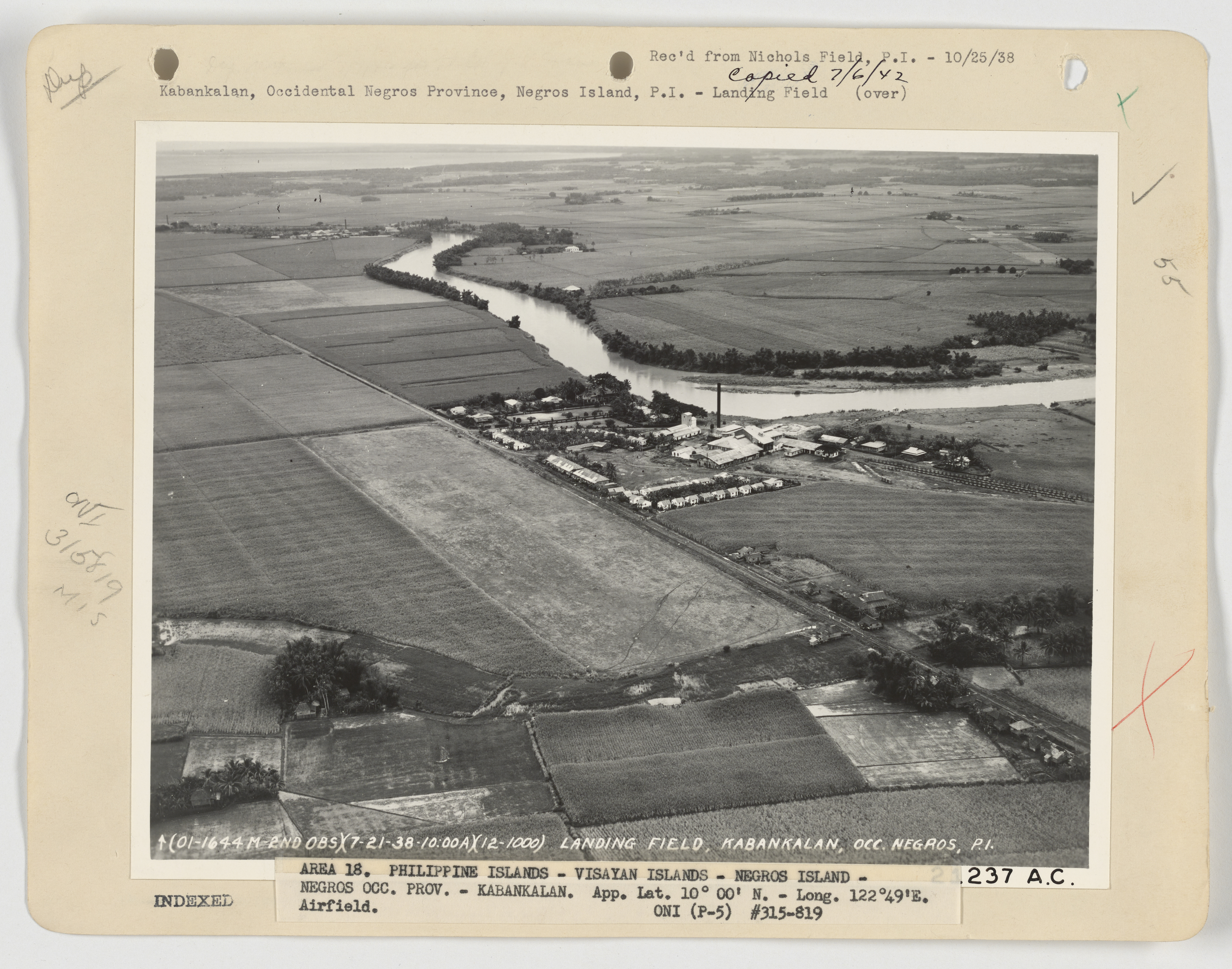
Aerial view of Kabankalan, 1938

According to historians, the first inhabitants of Kabankalan were people who came from neighboring towns. They derived the name Kabankalan from the word "bangkal" (Nauclea orientalis), a tree that is abundant in the place. The settlers established the Barangay form of government, with which every group has its own leader, called the Capitan.

In 1566 the Christianization of the Island of Negros began with the foundation of the mission of Binalbagan (1575), Tanjay (1580) and Ilog (1584) by the Augustinian missionaries. In 1622, at the request of Bishop Pedro de Arce of Cebu, the Recollects came to evangelize Negros. The spiritual administration of Binalbagan including that of Kabankalan was ceded to them. When the mission of Ilog was turned over to the Jesuits, it had four towns, Ilog being the chief town. The next was Kabankalan which already appears in a document dated 1630 as the center of encomienda of Admiral Cristobal de Lugo y Montalvo. The third was either Jima or Sima. The fourth was probably Su-ay. The Jesuits who served Kabankalan were Fr. Esteban Jayme. After the expulsion of the Jesuits from the Philippines in 1767, the Dominican missionaries came to continue the spiritual administration of Negros with Father Manuel Diez assigned in Kabankalan in 1769. During the Spanish regime, Spaniards taught the people the Spanish language and introduced to them the Roman Catholic religion.

In 1830, the three Capitanes- Polito Moreno, Vicente Rojas and Mariano Vingal-petitioned the government to transfer their barangay located at the Hilabangan River towards the area of Orong and established a town. They elected a migrant from Tigbauan, Iloilo-Leocadio Tayum y Gregorio- their new head, who served for one year. In 1856, 500 commissaries and policeman of Governor Emilio Saravia stationed in the poblacion attacked the stronghold “made of trunk” of the local chief Manyabog at Carol-an who endured the Spanish artillery for a long time. They disbanded only when a stray bullet killed Manyabog. Seeing their leader killed, they set themselves on fire with their houses. The tribal suicide resulted in the deaths 300 of Manyabog's men, while seven died on the opposite side. Prior to the actual revolt in 1898, clandestine activities had already been in the offing, the leaders of the revolution such as Aniceto Lacson joining the Katipunan and others arming themselves. By mid-1896, arms were unloaded in Binicuil, Kabankalan for the hacienderos of Kabankalan, Ilog, Himamaylan, Su-ay and Cauayan but they refrained to join the revolt knowing that they were not prepared and had no confidence in victory. It was not until November 7, 1898, that Kabankalan took up arms after Bacolod was taken over from the Spanish authorities. The Cantonal Republic of Negros was declared on November 5, 1898.

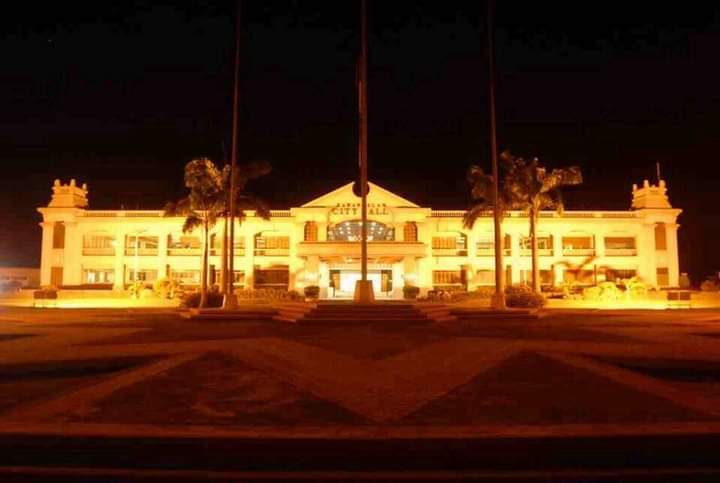
Kabankalan City Government Center (City Hall)

When the Americans came, they introduced a democratic form of government. During this time, a lot of improvements came to the town and new modern techniques of farming were introduced by the Americans to the local farmers that improved their products. On April 2, 1903, the Philippine Commission passed Act No. 716 reducing the 34 municipalities of the Province of Negros Occidental to 21 whereby the municipality of Cavancalan was merged to Ilog. On March 14, 1907, Philippine Commission passed Act. No. 1612 increasing the number of municipalities in Negros Occidental from 21 to 22 by separating from Ilog the former municipality of Cavancalan and reconstituting the same under the name Kabankalan. In mid-1907, a group of rebels called "Pulahanes" led by Papa Isio, raided the town and burned down all the houses. However, the people of Kabankalan quickly recovered and rebuilt the town from the destruction caused by the dissidents. Lorenzo Zayco was elected Municipal President in a special election and took his oath of office, along with other elected officials on January 2, 1908. Pre War-Kabankalan saw the emerging development of the sugar industry. Sugar mills were put up in Hacienda Bearin and Hacienda San Isidro.

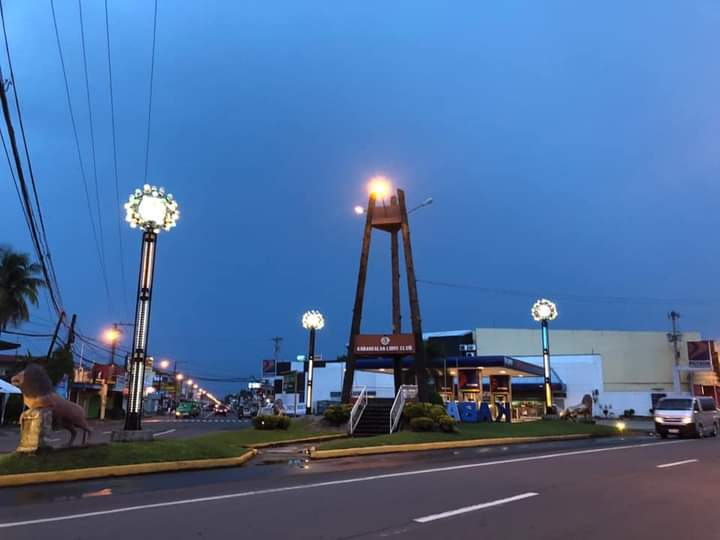
Kabankalan Lion's Arch

During the Second World War, Kabankalan was made a garrison town by Japanese Imperial Forces. Sugar mills were destroyed, school buildings were demolished and houses razed to ground. During this time, a recognized guerrilla unit and the local troops of the Philippine Commonwealth Army were formed to oppose the foreign aggression and many people fled to the mountains to avoid Japanese military abuse. When the Americans returned to the island to aid Filipino soldiers under the Commonwealth Army and Constabulary, and the recognized guerrillas, they helped the people be freed from Japanese occupation. Post war era concentrated on rehabilitation efforts that saw the establishment of two Sugar Mills-Dacongcogon and SONEDCO-placing Kabankalan at the crossroad of agro industrial development and setting the ground as a hub of business and trade in southern Negros. With the growth of the sugar industry, banks and other financial institutions and commercial establishments put up branches and offices in Kabankalan. The establishment of two sugar mills in the 1960s and early 1970s gave the town a boost into the list of the top improving towns of Negros.

=== Cityhood ===
The town of Kabankalan was declared by then President Fidel V. Ramos as a chartered city on August 2, 1997, under Republic Act No. 8297.

== Geography ==
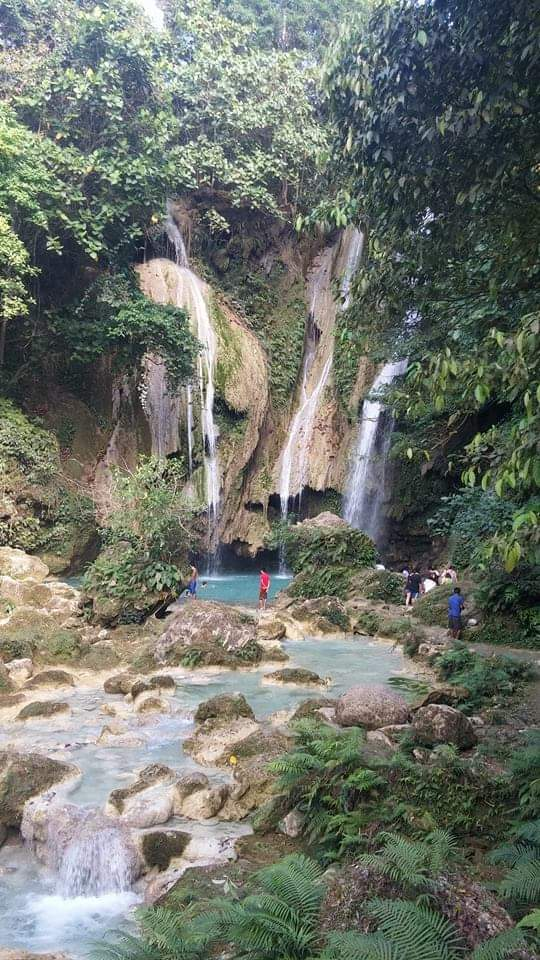
Mag-aso Falls, Kabankalan, Negros Occidental

Kabankalan occupies the central portion of the Southern Negros Island and its geographically located at 10° north and 122° east. It is bounded on the north by the City of Himamaylan, on the northwest by Panay Gulf, on the southwest by the Municipality of Ilog in Negros Occidental, on the southeast by the Municipality of Mabinay and on the south by the City of Bayawan in Negros Oriental. It is 88 kilometres (55 mi) away from Bacolod, 127 kilometres (79 mi) from Dumaguete, and 99 kilometres (62 mi) from the southernmost town of Hinoba-an. With an area of 697.35 square kilometers, it is the largest city in Negros Occidental and the second largest in the whole Negros Island, after Bayawan (which has an area of 699.08 square kilometers).

=== Climate ===
Climate data for Kabankalan
| Month | Jan | Feb | Mar | Apr | May | Jun | Jul | Aug | Sep | Oct | Nov | Dec | Year |
|---|---|---|---|---|---|---|---|---|---|---|---|---|---|
| Mean daily maximum °C (°F) | 30 (86) | 31 (88) | 32 (90) | 33 (91) | 32 (90) | 30 (86) | 29 (84) | 29 (84) | 29 (84) | 29 (84) | 30 (86) | 30 (86) | 30 (87) |
| Mean daily minimum °C (°F) | 22 (72) | 22 (72) | 22 (72) | 24 (75) | 25 (77) | 25 (77) | 25 (77) | 24 (75) | 24 (75) | 24 (75) | 23 (73) | 23 (73) | 24 (74) |
| Average precipitation mm (inches) | 38 (1.5) | 29 (1.1) | 55 (2.2) | 65 (2.6) | 141 (5.6) | 210 (8.3) | 212 (8.3) | 176 (6.9) | 180 (7.1) | 180 (7.1) | 130 (5.1) | 70 (2.8) | 1,486 (58.6) |
| Average rainy days | 9.0 | 7.2 | 11.1 | 13.5 | 25.6 | 28.4 | 28.9 | 27.3 | 26.9 | 27.7 | 21.8 | 13.8 | 241.2 |
Source: Meteoblue

Under the Coronas climate classification system, Kabankalan falls under Type III. Dry season is from December to May, while the rainy season is from June to November. Average temperature is 26 °C (80 °F).

=== Barangays ===
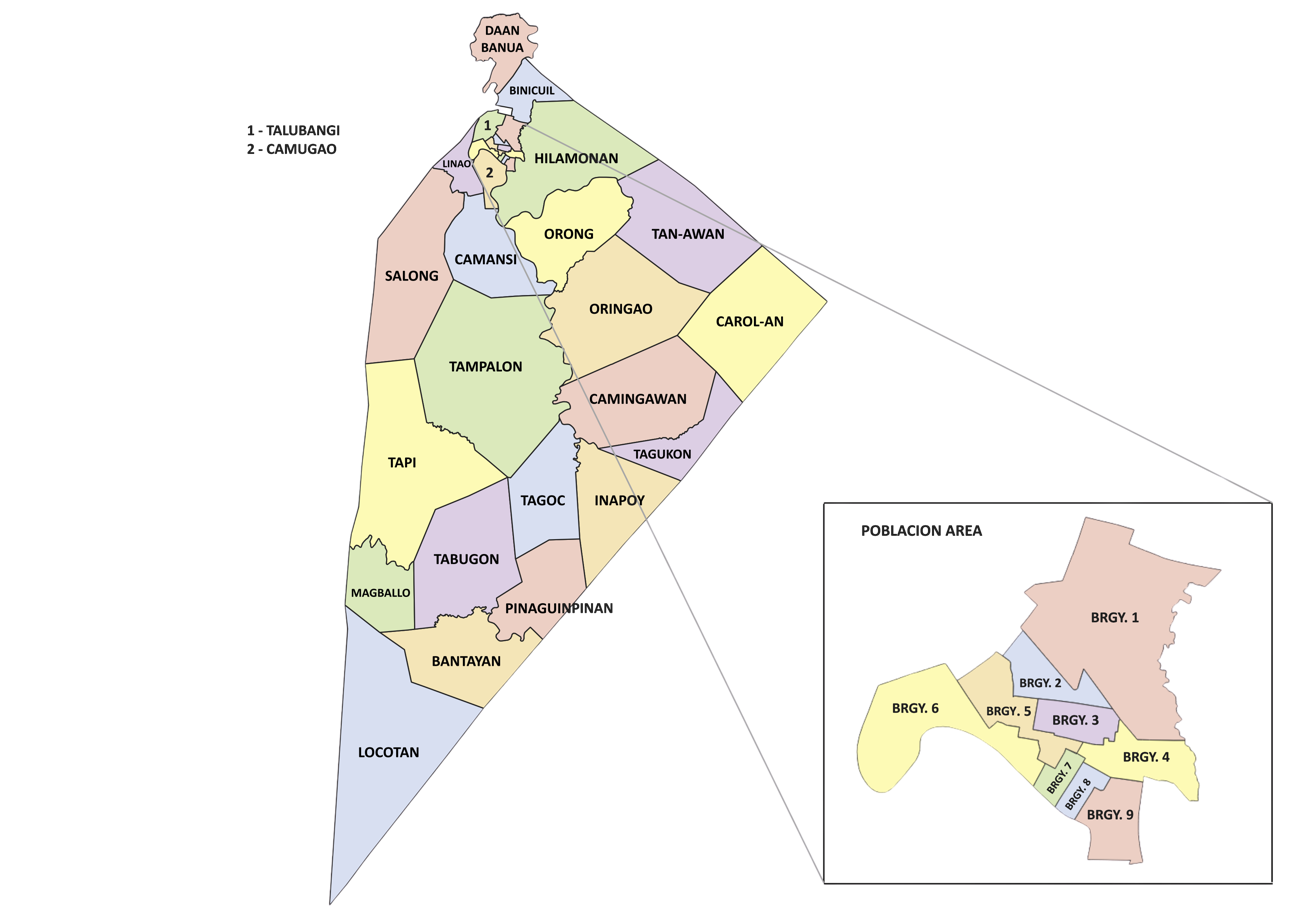
Political map of Kabankalan

Kabankalan City is politically subdivided into 32 barangays. Each barangay consists of puroks and some have sitios.

- Bantayan
- Binicuil
- Camansi
- Camingawan
- Camugao
- Carol-an
- Daan Banua
- Hilamonan
- Inapoy
- Linao
- Locotan
- Magballo
- Oringao
- Orong
- Pinaguinpinan
- Barangay 1 (Poblacion)
- Barangay 2 (Poblacion)
- Barangay 3 (Poblacion)
- Barangay 4 (Poblacion)
- Barangay 5 (Poblacion)
- Barangay 6 (Poblacion)
- Barangay 7 (Poblacion)
- Barangay 8 (Poblacion)
- Barangay 9 (Poblacion)
- Salong
- Tabugon
- Tagoc
- Tagukon
- Talubangi
- Tampalon
- Tan-awan
- Tapi

== Demographics ==
Population census of Kabankalan
| Year | Pop. | ±% p.a. |
|---|---|---|
| 1903 | 12,671 | — |
| 1918 | 17,113 | +2.02% |
| 1939 | 29,315 | +2.60% |
| 1948 | 47,817 | +5.59% |
| 1960 | 59,341 | +1.82% |
| 1970 | 72,567 | +2.03% |
| 1975 | 89,695 | +4.34% |
| 1980 | 92,109 | +0.53% |
| 1990 | 127,000 | +3.26% |
| 1995 | 139,282 | +1.74% |
| 2000 | 149,769 | +1.57% |
| 2007 | 166,970 | +1.51% |
| 2010 | 167,666 | +0.15% |
| 2015 | 181,977 | +1.57% |
| 2020 | 200,198 | +2.03% |
| 2024 | 210,893 | +1.26% |
Source: Philippine Statistics Authority

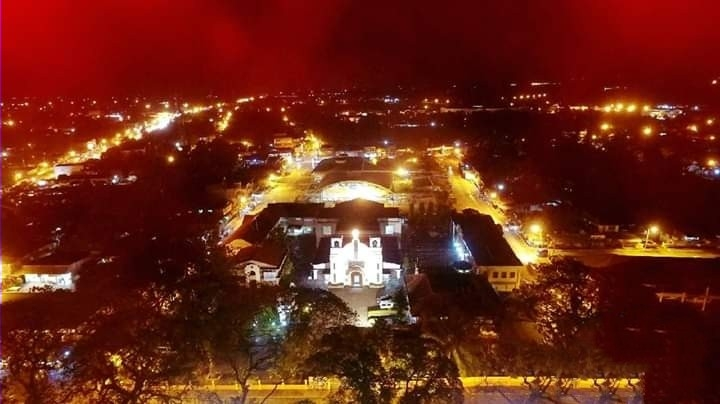
Aerial view of the city, with the Kabankalan Cathedral in the center.

=== Languages ===
Major languages are Hiligaynon, followed by Cebuano (both of those languages are used interchangeably in to day-to-day activities) with English and Tagalog being used as second languages.

Kabankalan City and the cities and the municipalities in the southwestern and the northeastern parts of the province are the only places in Negros Occidental whose residents can speak and understand both Cebuano and Hiligaynon due to their proximity to Negros Oriental.

The city is the only place where the Karol-an language is used. Due to its geographical area of usage, the Karol-an language is classified as a vulnerable language, making its conservation a top priority, as it is vital to the culture and arts of Kabankalan natives.

== Economy ==
Poverty incidence of Kabankalan

Source: Philippine Statistics Authority

== Infrastracture ==
=== Transportation ===
Kabankalan is over an hour's drive south of Bacolod City by car. Public utility vehicles reach the place in about two hours. The city, which serves as the hub of economic activities in southern Negros, is also the take-off point for various destinations down south, and links the province to Dumaguete, the capital of Negros Oriental, via the Kabankalan-Mabinay Highway.

Currently under construction, the Kabankalan City Domestic Airport, once opened, will be the second active airport in the province (after the Bacolod-Silay International Airport).

== Notable people ==
- Rene Adad - Member of the Executive committee and Executive council of the Asian Football Confederation , Deputy chairman of the Asian Football Federation legal committee, 11th President of the Philippine Football Federation
- Mercedes Alvarez-Lansang - Deputy Speaker of the House of Representatives of the Philippines
- Patricio Buzon - Catholic prelate, 6th Bishop of the Diocese of Bacolod, 2nd Bishop of the Diocese of Kabankalan
- Louie Galbines - Catholic prelate, 3rd Bishop of the Diocese of Kabankalan
- Alex Lacson - Author
- Vicente Navarra - Catholic prelate, 5th Bishop of the Diocese of Bacolod, 1st Bishop of the Diocese of Kabankalan
- Jonah Sabete - Professional volleyball player at the Premier Volleyball League
- Jose Maria Zubiri Jr. - 9th Governor of Bukidnon , Member of the House of Representatives of the Philippines
- Juan Miguel Zubiri - Senator , 30th President of the Senate of the Philippines
