= Santo Niño Shrine =

Roman Catholic church in Negros Occidental, Philippines

- Diocesan Shrine and Parish of Señor Santo Niño
- Old Kabankalan Cathedral
- Pang-Diyosises na Dambana at Parokya ng Señor Santo Niño (Filipino); Santuario Diocesano y Parroquia del Señor Santo Niño (Spanish)
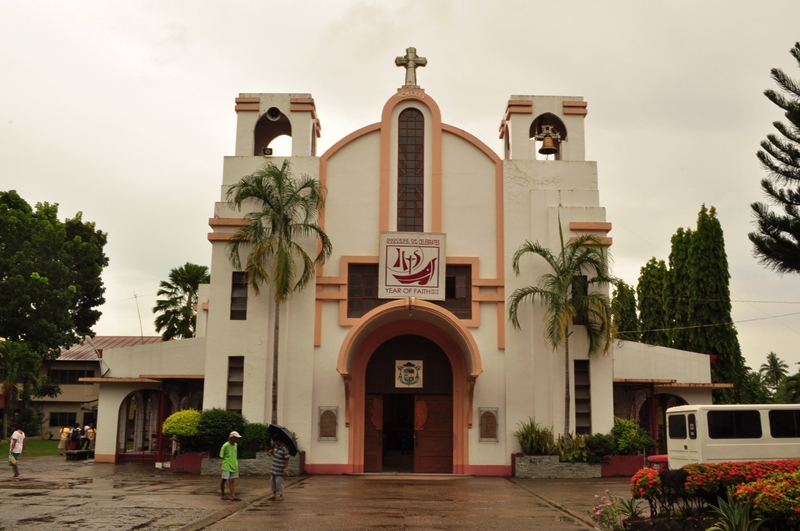
- Shrine facade in 2013

- Location in the Visayas Location in the Philippines
- 10°00′32″N 122°48′31″E
- Location: Kabankalan, Negros Occidental
- Country: Philippines
- Denomination: Roman Catholic

History
- Former name: Cathedral of Saint Francis Xavier
- Status: Parish, Shrine
- Founded: 1935; 91 years ago
- Dedication: Holy Child Jesus
- Consecrated: 1935, 1987

Architecture
- Functional status: Active
- Architectural type: Church building
- Style: Modern
- Completed: 1935; 91 years ago

Administration
- Metropolis: Jaro
- Diocese: Kabankalan

The Diocesan Shrine and Parish of Señor Santo Niño, commonly known as the Santo Niño Parish-Shrine, is a parish, shrine and proto-cathedral of the Roman Catholic Diocese of Kabankalan in the Philippines. It is located in the city proper of Kabankalan, Negros Occidental, in the Western Visayas region of the country.

== History ==
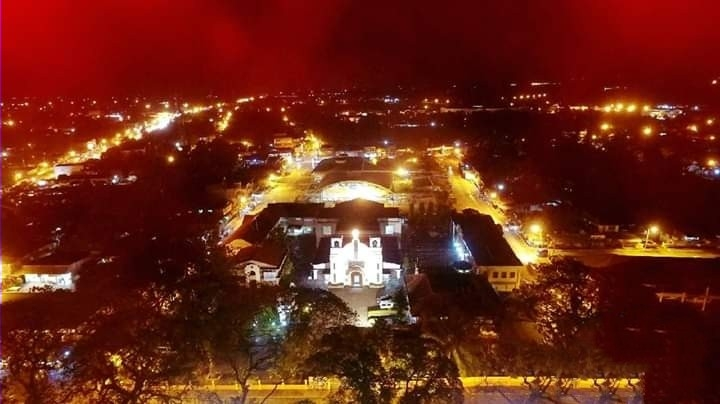
Aerial view of Kabankalan city proper, with the old cathedral in the center

Christianization efforts in the island of Negros were started by the Augustinian Recollects during the Spanish colonial period. Kabankalan, then spelled as Cavancalan and Cabangcalan, was formerly a sitio of the neighboring municipality of Ilog. It is named after the bangkal tree. Kabankalan received its first parish priest in 1848. A chapel was built in 1905 by Fr. Tiburcio Fernandez. In March 1907, Kabankalan was separated formally from Ilog as an independent municipality through the Philippine Commission's Act 1612. The present church structure was built and inaugurated in December 1935 by Fr. Felipe Lerena. It was dedicated to Saint Francis Xavier, a 16th-century Jesuit priest. Among those who helped in building the church were Manuel Montinola, Engineer M. Sales, and the hacenderos of the province's sugar industry. The church of Kabankalan was elevated to the status of a cathedral when the Diocese of Kabankalan was founded in 1987. The diocese administers the southern portion of Negros Occidental.

== Transfer ==
The construction for the new cathedral in Hda. Clementina, Brgy. Talubangi, Kabankalan City, Negros Occidental began in 2013 under Bishop Patricio Buzon. The new cathedral was officially consecrated and inaugurated on September 8, 2022, during the Feast of the Nativity of the Blessed Virgin Mary. The solemn dedication of the new Saint Francis Xavier Cathedral was presided over by His Eminence, Jose Lazaro Cardinal Advincula, Archbishop of Manila on December 2, 2025, a day before the feast of Saint Francis Xavier, making it the new seat of the Diocese of Kabankalan.
