= Kabankalan Cathedral =

- Cathedral of Saint Francis Xavier
- Katedral ni San Francisco Javier (Filipino); Catedral de San Francisco Javier (Spanish)
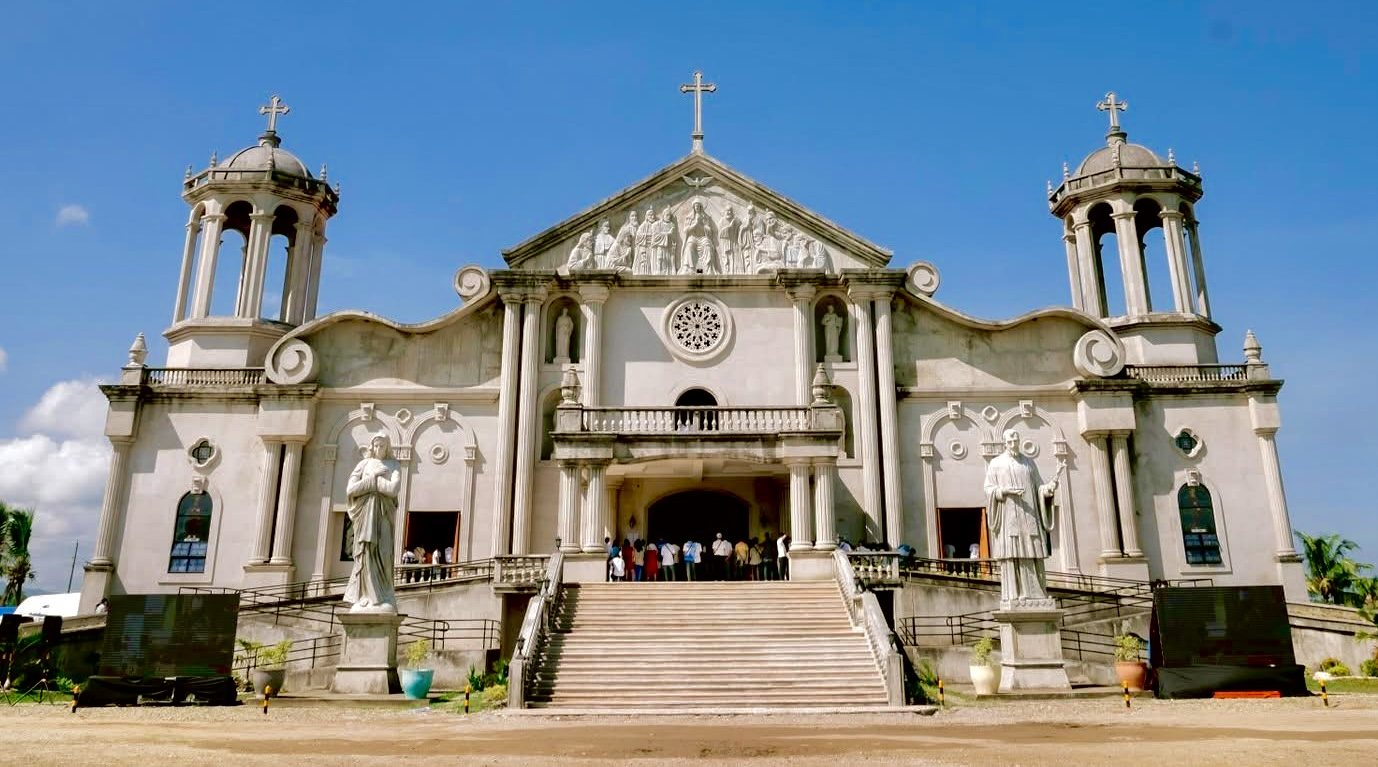
- Cathedral's facade in 2026.

- Location in the Visayas Location in the Philippines
- 10°00′31″N 122°48′31″E
- Location: Kabankalan, Negros Occidental
- Country: Philippines
- Language(s): Hiligaynon, English
- Denomination: Roman Catholic

History
- Status: Cathedral
- Dedication: Francis Xavier
- Dedicated: December 2, 2025; 8 months ago
- Consecrated: September 8, 2022; 3 years ago

Architecture
- Functional status: Active
- Previous cathedrals: Santo Niño Shrine (Kabankalan)
- Architectural type: Church building
- Style: Spanish Colonial
- Groundbreaking: 2013
- Completed: 2021; 5 years ago

Administration
- Metropolis: Jaro
- Diocese: Kabankalan

Clergy
- Bishop: Sede vacante

The Cathedral of Saint Francis Xavier, or commonly known as the Kabankalan Cathedral, is a cathedral and the episcopal seat of the Roman Catholic Diocese of Kabankalan located at Hacienda Clementina, Barangay Talubangi, Kabankalan, Negros Occidental, Philippines.

== History ==
Located in Talubang village, the cathedral took approximately eight years to complete, with construction beginning in 2013 during Bishop Buzon’s tenure as head of the diocese. The new cathedral was inaugurated on September 8, 2022 during the Feast of the Nativity of the Blessed Virgin Mary, marking its formal consecration. Hundreds of attendees, including government officials, gathered for the mass presided over by Bishop Louie Galbines, alongside Bishop Patricio Buzon of the Diocese of Bacolod and Bishop Julito Cortes of Diocese of Dumaguete. Bishop Galbines described the cathedral as a significant landmark for the diocese, emphasizing that its grandeur symbolizes how unity with the Lord and with one another enables the community to dream big and achieve great things.

The cathedral was solemnly dedicated on December 2, 2025, under Saint Francis Xavier and was presided over by cardinal Jose Advincula, Archbishop of Manila, a day before the feast of Saint Francis Xavier, making it the new episcopal seat of the Diocese of Kabankalan.

== Architecture ==
The Saint Francis Xavier Cathedral is designed in the Spanish colonial tradition, incorporating Renaissance domes, Baroque ornamentation, and Neoclassical symmetry within a distinctly Filipino ecclesiastical framework. Its defining architectural elements include a central dome, twin bell towers symbolizing ecclesiastical authority, a prominent façade, and a longitudinal nave enriched with stained glass windows and detailed moldings. The spatial composition emphasizes axial alignment, vertical emphasis, and balanced proportions characteristic of classical church architecture. The restoration, led by the core team of Ranel Jamarolin, Rodillado Timbad Jr.; and Jofer Leo Rivas of the JLP Rivas Architects & Associates, prioritizes conservation of original features such as the façade, domes, altars, and ornamental details while integrating structural reinforcements, modern building systems, improved lighting, and enhanced circulation. The redesign strengthens the foundation, refines landscape integration, and introduces functional spaces that support contemporary liturgical and community use, ensuring structural resilience without compromising historical integrity.
