= Florentino Galang Sr. National High School =

Public high school in Negros Occidental, Philippines

Location
- Purok Pinetree, Brgy. Oringao, Kabankalan City, Negros Occidental; Philippines; 9°57′15″N 122°50′11″E

Information
- Former name: Binicuil NHS - Oringao Extension
- Motto: basta_Florentinians_maGALANG
- Religious affiliation: Non Partisan
- Established: June 1989
- School district: Division of the City of Kabankalan
- Principal: Jolly Gariando Jr.
- Color
- Accreditation: RA 8310
- Website: fgalangsrnhs.edu.ph

Florentino Galang Sr. National High School is a public secondary educational institution in Kabankalan City in the province of Negros Occidental, in the Philippines. The school currently offers various curriculum: Special Program in Science Technology, Engineering and Mathematics (STEM) for the Special Science Class, Basic Education Curriculum for the Regular Class, Special Program for the Arts, and Special Class in Culture.

== History ==
Florentino Galang Sr. National High School (FGSNHS) is located at Barangay Oringao, Kabankalan City, Negros Occidental. It is about 14 km (8.7 mi) away from the city. It was established in June 1989 as one of the extension school of Binicuil National High School (BNHS) headed by Mrs. Maria B. Flores, principal. The school started in the garage of Don Florentino Galang, provided by Brgy. Captain Rolando Pedregosa. It came to existence not by chance but because of the burning desire of the local officials and the parents in Brgy. Oringao. It began with 151 students with four volunteer teachers, namely Mrs. Cossette M. Balayo, Mrs. Lanie P. Figueroa, Mrs. Nancy T. Tadlas and Mrs. Aida D. Yanson as the Officer-In-Charge.

In the year 1991, the owner of Hda. Galang, Don Florentino Galang Sr. donated a lot where classrooms were built through the effort of the Brgy. Councils with the help of Mayor Isidro P. Zayco and Congressman Genaro Alvarez. The toil of the people who worked hard earn a fulfilling award in the first commencement exercise of the school in 1993.

On March 5, 1995 the school PTA officers together with the Brgy. Officials passed a resolution requesting Hon. Genaro Alvarez to sponsor a bill for the separation of BNHS-Oringao Extension from Binicuil National High School – Main. Two years after, June 14, 1997, RA 8310 approved the separation of the school from the main school and known as Florentino Galang Sr. National High School.

Mr. Mario O. Diagmel took over the school as Teacher in Charge after the successful separation. Two years after, he was replaced by Mr. Theodore P. Covacha as the first school Principal followed by Mrs. Norma J. Salditos, then Mr. Theodore P. Covacha again till he retires. After he retired, the school was then headed by Mr. Jolly G. Gariando Jr. with twenty none (29) Regular/Permanent teachers, two literacy workers with seven hundred nineteen (719) students enrolled in the main school alone with eighteen (18) classes.

== Extension Campuses ==
Because of the influx of the students to make education accessible to the adjacent Brgys., extension schools were organized. School Year 2008–2009, Brgy. Camingawan and Brgy. Orong headed by their respective Officer-in-Charge namely, Mrs. Jonalyn A. Dela Cerna and Mrs. Donna T. Banaglorioso. In school year 2010–11, another extension was organized at Hinapunan headed by Denrose Entierro.

Progress and development continues as improvement mushroomed around the premises of the said institution. The existence of SENIOR HIGH SCHOOL for the year 2016–2017 with an enrollment of three hundred ten (310) grade 11 students under two tracks with 8 strands having thirteen (13) teachers.

Presently, the school has extended its arms to another venue where there are 28 Grade 7 students enrolled. The extension at Sitio Colambo headed by Mr. Joel Pacheo (1 teacher and 1 literacy teacher); For this year the main school has Eight Hundred Seventy-Two (872) enrollees and thirty-two (32) teachers; Camingawan Extension has six hundred ten (610) students and 14 teachers; Orong Extension has four hundred sixteen (416) students and 9 teachers with the total of 1,926 for Junior High School. While Grade 11 has three hundred seventy-eight (378) and Grade 12 has two hundred fifty-three (253) students with a total of six hundred thirty-one (631) and twenty-three (23) teachers. All in all, Florentino Galang has 2,636 students and 87 teachers for the school year 2017–2018.
