= Diocese of Kabankalan =

Latin Catholic diocese in the Philippines

Coordinates: 9.9892°N 122.8147°E

Diocese of Kabankalan Dioecesis Cabancalensis Diyosesis sang Kabankalan Diyosesis ng Kabankalan Diócesis de Kabankalan

Catholic
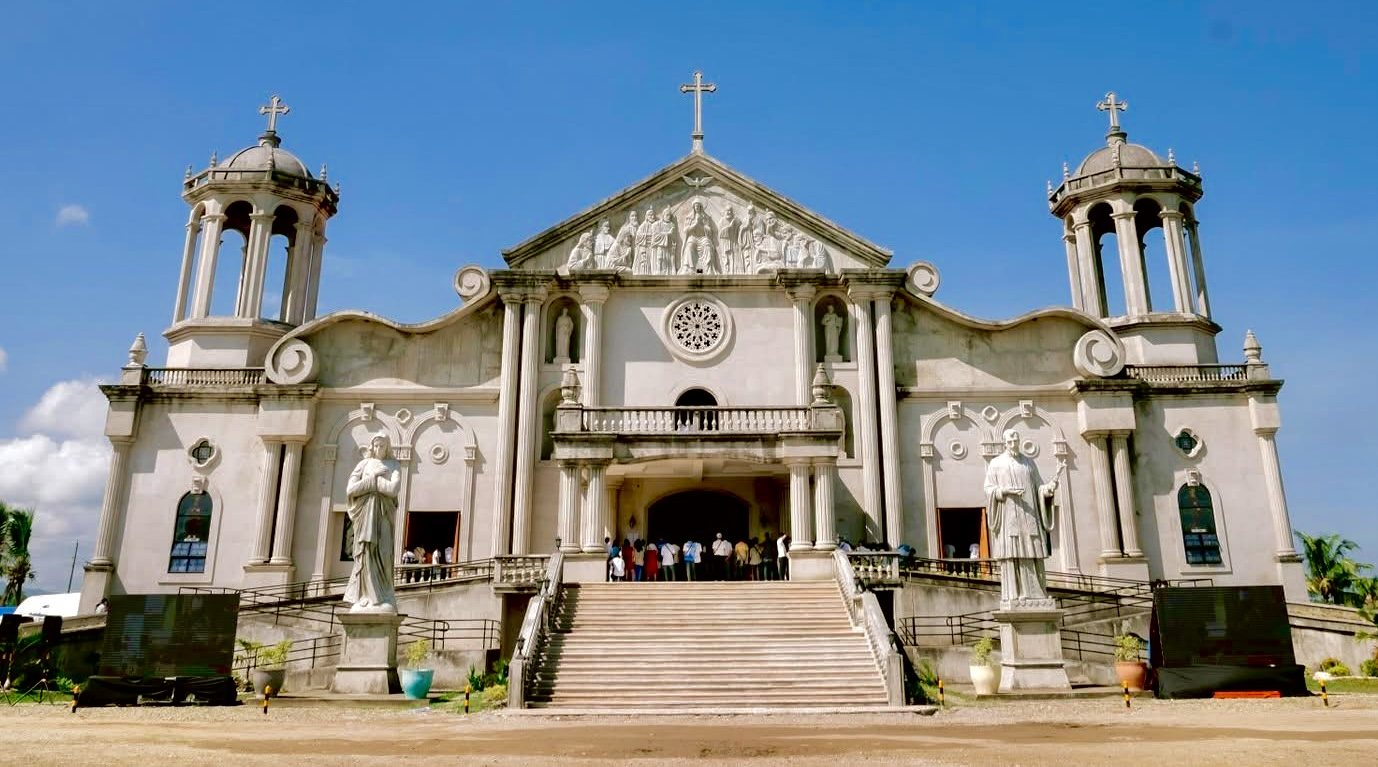
- Kabankalan Cathedral

- Coat of arms

Location
- Country: Philippines
- Territory: 5th and 6th congressional districts of Negros Occidental except Hinigaran (Binalbagan, Candoni, Cauayan, Himamaylan City, Hinoba-an, Ilog, Isabela, Kabankalan City, La Castellana, Moises Padilla, Sipalay City)
- Ecclesiastical province: Jaro
- Metropolitan: Jaro
- Deaneries: 5

Statistics
- Area: 3,923.7 km^{2} (1,514.9 sq mi)
- Population: Total; Catholics: (as of 2023); 982,071; 785,651 (80%)
- Parishes: 31

Information
- Denomination: Catholic
- Sui iuris church: Latin Church
- Rite: Roman Rite
- Established: March 30, 1987
- Cathedral: Saint Francis Xavier Cathedral
- Patron saint: Francis Xavier
- Secular priests: 67

Current leadership
- Pope: Leo XIV
- Bishop: sede vacante
- Metropolitan Archbishop: Midyphil B. Billones
- Apostolic Administrator: Midyphil B. Billones

Website
- Diocese of Kabankalan

The Diocese of Kabankalan (Lat: Dioecesis Cabancalensis) is a Latin Catholic diocese of the Catholic Church in central Philippines. The diocese is centered in the Kabankalan City in Negros Occidental province and covers the southern part of the province. It is a suffragan of the Archdiocese of Jaro like the other two dioceses of Negros Occidental.

The titular patron of the diocese is Francis Xavier, whose feast day is December 3. The seat of the bishop is the New Saint Francis Xavier Cathedral in Kabankalan. Its former diocesan cathedral was one of the 12 churches founded by the Order of Augustinian Recollects that are now Catholic cathedrals in the Philippines.

The diocese is currently sede vacante. Bishop Louie Patalinghug Galbines was the most recent bishop of Kabankalan, who was appointed as the seventh bishop of Bacolod by Pope Leo XIV on May 14, 2026. On August 11, 2026, Pope Leo XIV appointed Archbishop Midyphil Billones, Metropolitan Archbishop of Jaro as its apostolic administrator while the diocese awaits for the appointment of a new bishop.

== History ==
A map of the dioceses in Negros and Cebu.

The entire island of Negros was once under the jurisdiction of the Diocese of Bacolod. The diocese was later split into four dioceses: the Diocese of Dumaguete in 1955; the Diocese of San Carlos and the Diocese of Kabankalan in 1987. The dioceses are suffragans of the Archdiocese of Jaro, except for Dumaguete which is a suffragan of the Archdiocese of Cebu.

Kabankalan was proclaimed a diocese on March 30, 1987 and Bishop Vicente Navarra, auxiliary bishop of Capiz was appointed by Pope John Paul II on November 21, 1987 as the first bishop of Kabankalan and was formally installed on February 11, 1988.

On May 24, 2001, Vicente Navarra was appointed as the fifth bishop of Bacolod. The diocese was entrusted to the care of the diocesan administrator, Rev. Msgr. Rogelio B. Cruz.

Pope John Paul II appointed Patricio Buzon, provincial superior of the Southern Salesian Province in Cebu City, as the second bishop of Kabankalan on December 27, 2002. His episcopal consecration took place on February 19, 2003 at Our Lady of Lourdes Parish in Punta Princesa, Cebu City. Cardinal Ricardo Vidal, Archbishop of Cebu served as his principal consecrator, assisted by Bishop Precioso Cantillas of Maasin and Bishop Vicente Navarra. He was officially installed as bishop of Kabankalan on March 12, 2003.

Bishop Buzon was appointed as the sixth bishop of Bacolod on May 24, 2016. Rev. Msgr. Rolando G. Nueva served as the diocesan administrator during the sede vacante period.

On March 12, 2018, Pope Francis appointed Rev. Msgr. Louie Galbines, then vicar general of the Diocese of Bacolod as the third bishop of Kabankalan. He was consecrated on May 28, 2018, at San Sebastian Cathedral in Bacolod City, with Cardinal Gaudencio Rosales, Archbishop emeritus of Manila serving as the principal consecrator. His installation took place the following day at St. Francis Xavier Cathedral in Kabankalan City.

Pope Leo XIV appointed Bishop Galbines as the seventh bishop of Bacolod on May 14, 2026. On August 11, 2026, Pope Leo XIV appointed Archbishop Midyphil Billones of Jaro as its apostolic administrator.

All of the three bishops of Kabankalan were subsequently appointed bishops of Bacolod.

The diocese is set to host the Regional Youth Day 2028 - Western Visayas and Romblon.

=== Saint Francis Xavier Cathedral ===
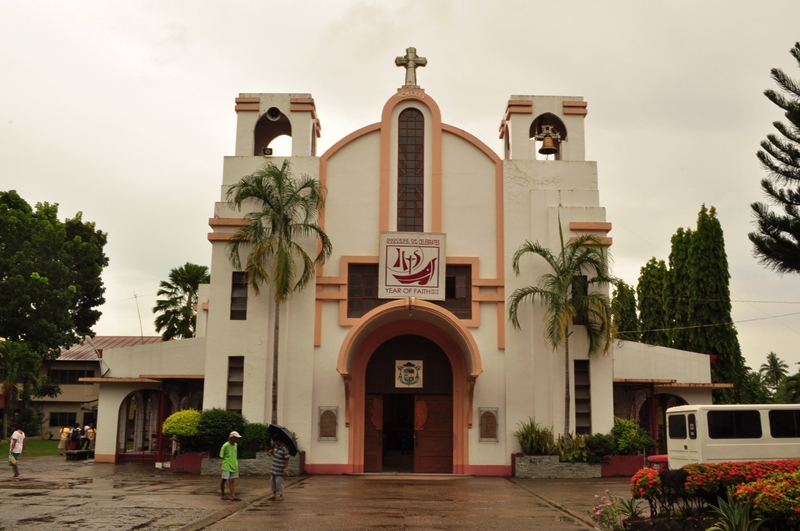
Old St. Francis Xavier Cathedral (now the Diocesan Shrine and Parish of Señor Santo Niño).

Since its erection, the seat of the bishop was in the Old St. Francis Xavier Cathedral (now Diocesan Shrine and Parish of Señor Santo Niño) in downtown Kabankalan fronting the Public Plaza. The compound of the former Kabankalan Cathedral was gutted by a fire in 1986, a year before the creation of the diocese.

The construction for a new cathedral in Hda. Clementina, Barangay Talubangi, Kabankalan City began in 2013 under Bishop Patricio Buzon. The new cathedral was officially consecrated and inaugurated on September 8, 2022, during the Feast of the Nativity of the Blessed Virgin Mary, marking its formal consecration. Hundreds of attendees, including government officials, gathered for the mass presided over by Bishop Louie Galbines, alongside Bishop Patricio Buzon of Bacolod and Bishop Julito Cortes of Dumaguete. Bishop Galbines described the cathedral as a significant landmark for the diocese, emphasizing that its grandeur symbolizes how unity with the Lord and with one another enables the community to dream big and achieve great things.

The solemn dedication of the new Saint Francis Xavier Cathedral was presided over by Cardinal Jose Advincula, Archbishop of Manila on December 2, 2025, a day before the feast of Saint Francis Xavier, making it the new seat of the Diocese of Kabankalan.

== Coat of arms ==
The yellow background represents the color of the Church and of the papacy. The cross and the hand holding it represent St. Francis Xavier, the diocesan patron. The clear skies, the mountains ranges and the sugarcane depict the typical milieu in the Diocese of Kabankalan. The stalks of sugarcane, which remain the chief produce of Negros Island, depict the aim of the diocese to be in solidarity with its people.

== Jurisdiction ==
The Diocese of Kabankalan comprises the entire southern portion of Negros Occidental, extending from the town of La Castellana, just below La Carlota City, all the way to Hinoba-an on the southernmost coast. It covers 11 cities and municipalities of the province occupying a total land area of 3,923.7 square kilometers (1,514.9 sq mi) and, as of 2011, a population of 769,393 of which 80 per cent are Catholics. The cities and municipalities under the Diocese of Kabankalan are Kabankalan City, Binalbagan, Himamaylan City, Isabela, Moises Padilla, La Castellana, Ilog, Candoni, Cauayan, Sipalay City, and Hinoba-an.

== Ordinaries ==
=== Bishops of Kabankalan ===
No.	Bishop	Period in office	Notes	Coat of arms
1	Most Rev. Vicente Macanan Navarra, DD	February 11, 1988 – May 24, 2001 (13 years, 102 days)	Former Auxiliary Bishop of Capiz Appointed Bishop of Bacolod	
2	Most Rev. Patricio Abella Buzon, SDB, DD	March 12, 2003 – May 24, 2016 (13 years, 73 days)	Appointed Bishop of Bacolod	
3	Most Rev. Louie Patalinghug Galbines, SThD, DD	May 29, 2018 – May 14, 2026 (7 years, 350 days)	Appointed Bishop of Bacolod	

=== Diocesan administrators (sede vacante) ===
Apostolic administrator

Administrator	Period in office
Rev. Msgr. Rogelio B. Cruz, JCL, VG	July 19, 2001 – March 12, 2003 (1 year, 236 days)
Rev. Msgr. Rolando G. Nueva, VG	August 9, 2016 – May 29, 2018 (1 year, 293 days)
Most Rev. Midyphil B. Billones, DD	August 11, 2026 – present (6 days)

== See also ==
- Catholic Church in the Philippines
