= San Diego Pro-Cathedral, Silay =

Roman Catholic church in Negros Occidental, Philippines

San Diego Pro-Cathedral
- Procatedral de San Diego (Spanish)
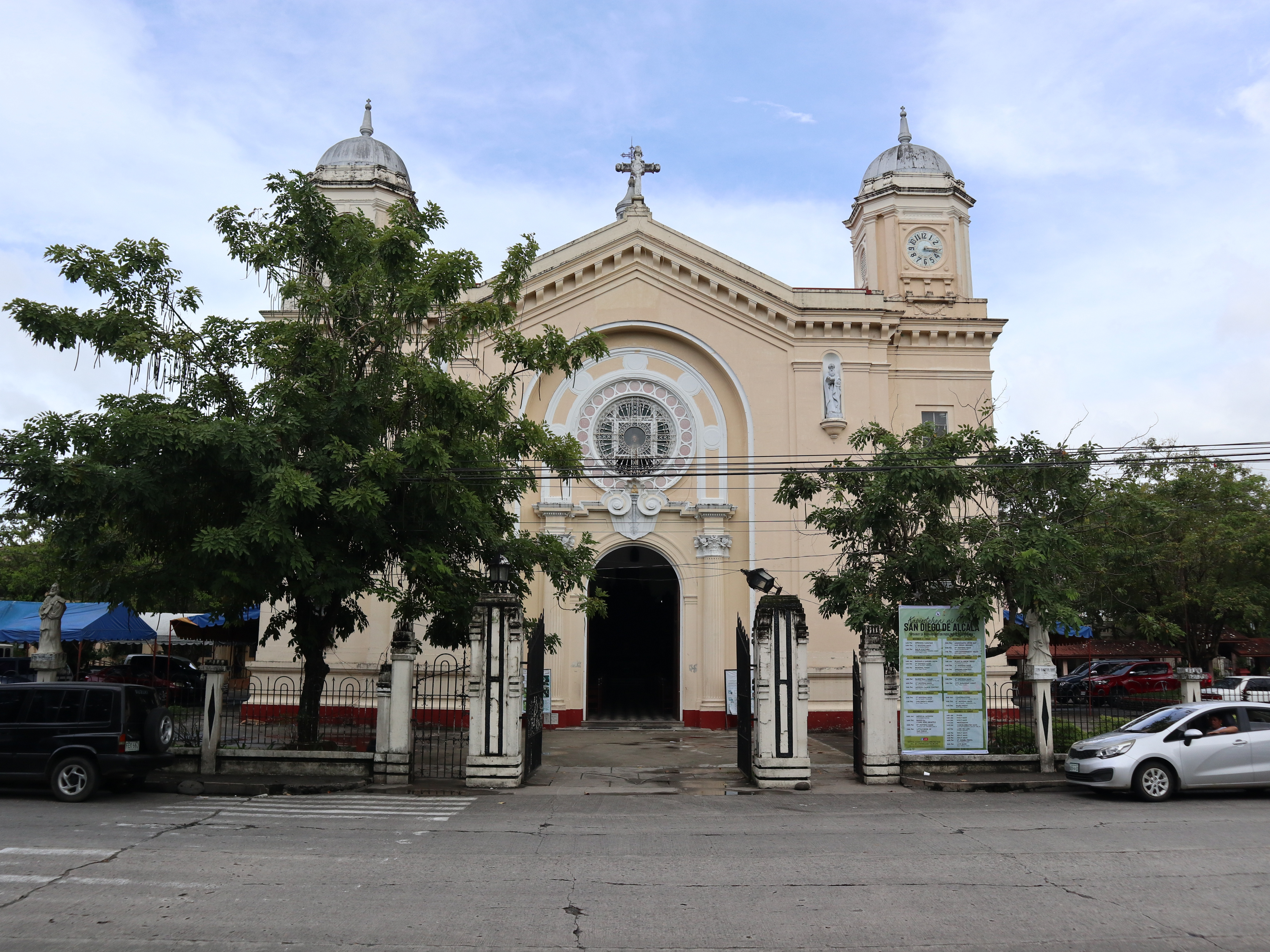
- Church facade in 2022

- Location in the Visayas Location in the Philippines
- 10°48′01″N 122°58′33″E
- Location: Silay, Negros Occidental, Philippines
- Denomination: Roman Catholic

History
- Former names: San Diego Parish Church; Saint Didacus Parish Church
- Status: Pro-cathedral
- Dedication: Didacus of Alcalá
- Consecrated: 1776

Architecture
- Functional status: active
- Architect: Lucio Bernasconi
- Architectural type: Church building
- Style: Romanesque
- Groundbreaking: 1925
- Completed: 1927

Specifications
- Materials: concrete

Administration
- Diocese: Bacolod

San Diego Pro-cathedral, formerly known as San Diego Parish Church or St. Didacus Parish Church before its declaration as a pro-cathedral in 1994, is an early 20th-century Roman Catholic church in Silay, Negros Occidental in the Philippines. It is under the jurisdiction of the Diocese of Bacolod. It is currently the only pro-cathedral in the country and is unique in Negros Occidental for being the only church in the province featuring a cupola or dome.

== History ==
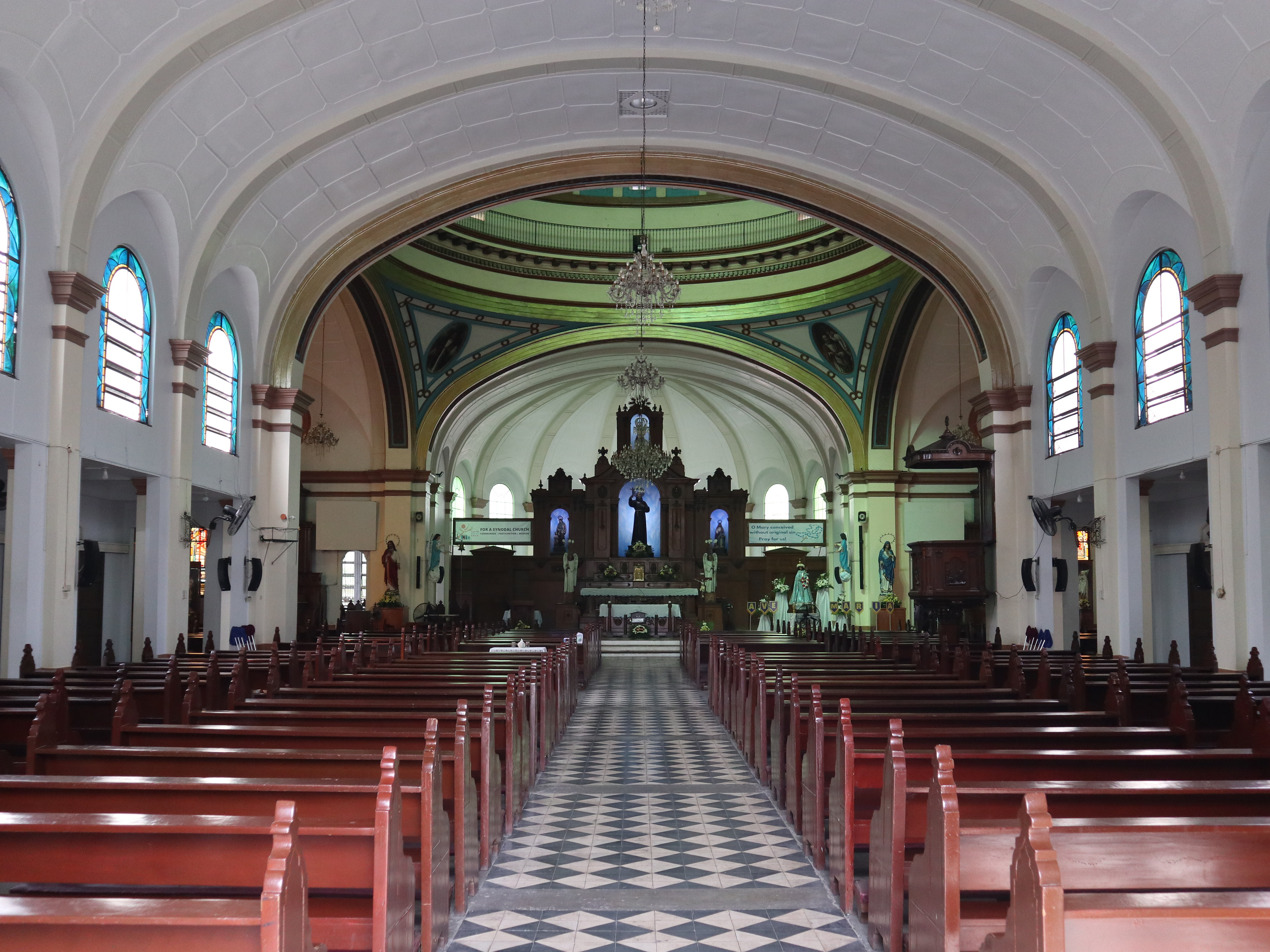
Cathedral interior in 2022

The parish of Silay was established in 1776 and its first church was built of light materials: bamboo, cogon grass and nipa palm during the time of Gobernadorcillo Alejo Severino's administration. Padre Alejo Ignacio de Molinas, a Spaniard, was its first priest. In 1841, then-parish priest Fr. Eusebio Locsin initiated the construction of a more permanent structure made of stone and wood. The roof was improved through the use of galvanized iron. Further improvements were done but When the revolution broke out on November 5, 1898, the church was left unfinished.

In 1925, work began on a grander structure meant to replace the old church. Don Jose R. Ledesma, a resident of Silay and a wealthy sugar baron, donated a substantial portion of the funds needed to build the new edifice. The rest of the money was raised through popular contribution, including fund-raising by schoolchildren.

Don Jose Ledesma commissioned an Italian architect, Lucio Bernasconi to design the new church. Bernasconi was also responsible for the design and construction of the Silay Wharf, which was razed by Imperial Japanese soldiers during the Second World War. Bernasconi took the churches in his native Italy as the model for the Silay church. The church's layout is in the shape of a Latin cross, with a cupola rising forty meters above the nave. Construction was completed in 1927, and the new church was inaugurated that same year.

== Patron saint ==
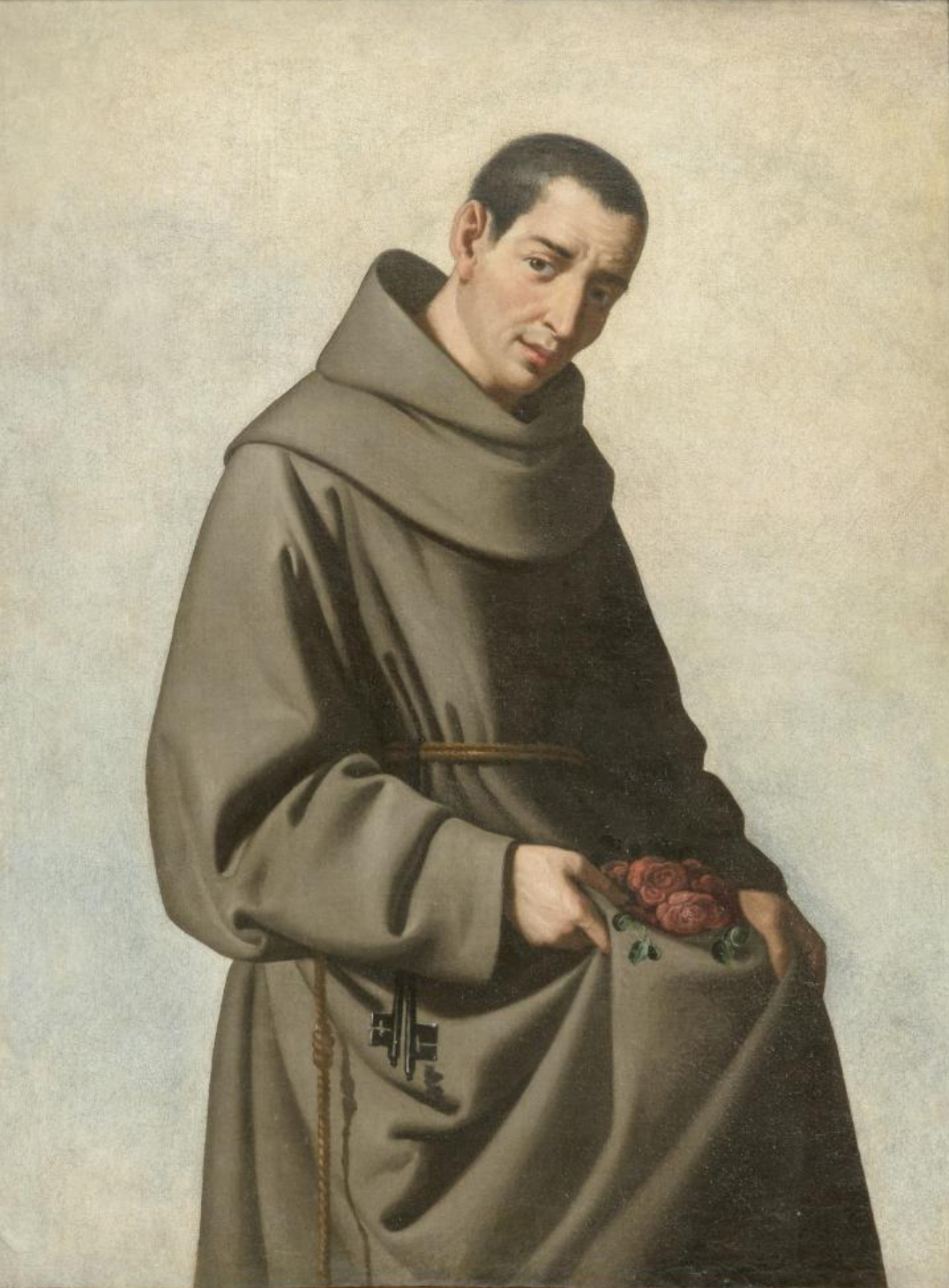
Diego de Alcalá, by Francisco de Zurbarán

The San Diego Pro-cathedral is named in honor of Didacus of Alcalá, the Franciscan saint more commonly known in the Philippines as San Diego de Alcalá. A local historian has conjectured that San Diego was given as a patron saint to the early settlement that became Silay by Fr. Diego Gomez de Covarrubias when he became the parish priest of the neighboring settlement of Bago, and Silay was his visita – a settlement he was responsible for attending to as a visiting priest.

== Pro-cathedral ==
On December 25, 1994, then-Bishop of the Diocese of Bacolod, Monsignor Camilo Gregorio declared the San Diego Parish Church a pro-cathedral. At that time, the San Diego Parish Church was the second Catholic church to be declared a pro-cathedral in the Philippines, after the San Miguel Pro-cathedral in San Miguel, Manila, which served as a provisional co-cathedral for ready use when the Manila Cathedral was closed for reconstruction. Silay Pro-cathedral served the purpose of Bacolod Cathedral during times of repair.

== Gallery ==
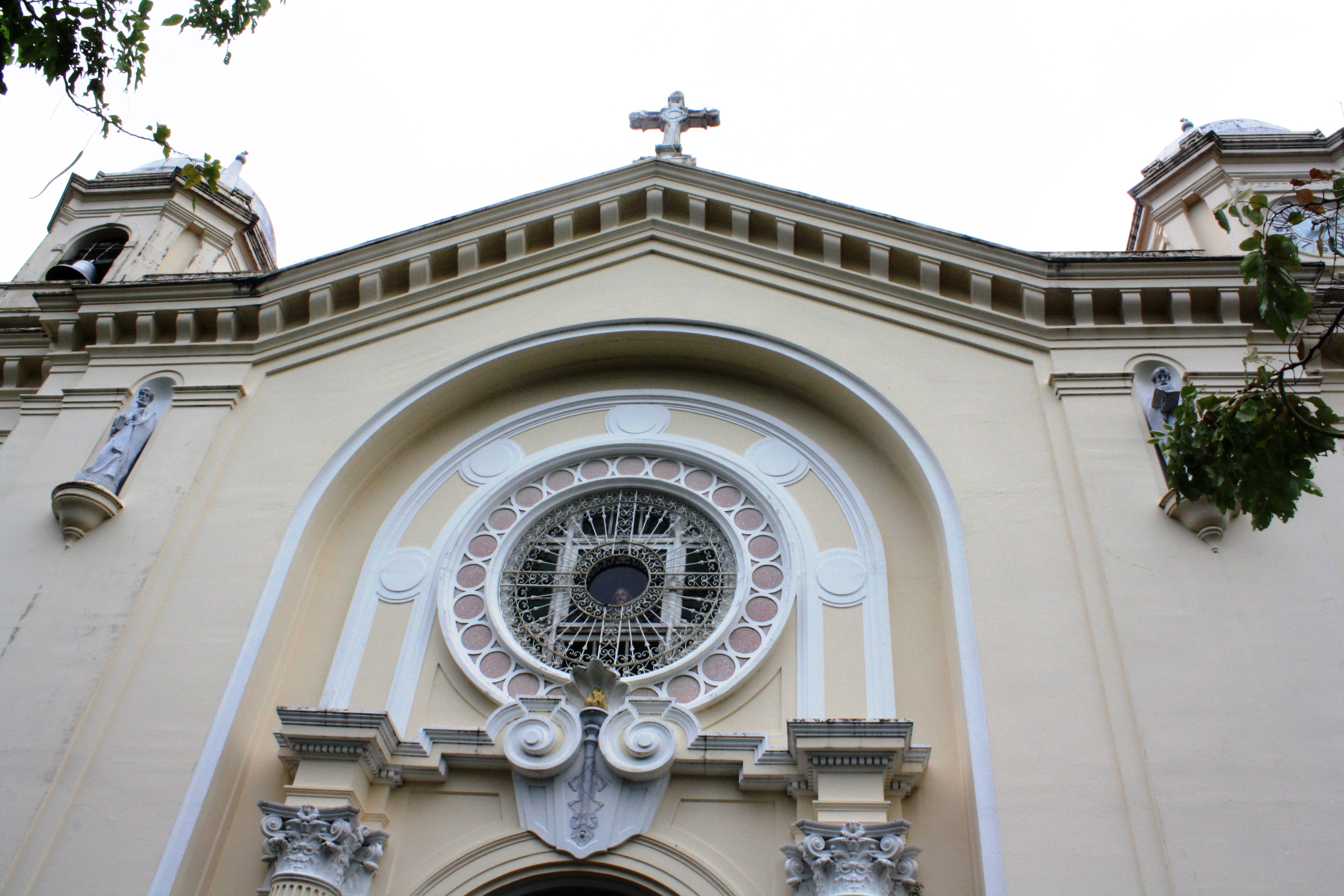
Detail of the circular window above the cathedral main portal

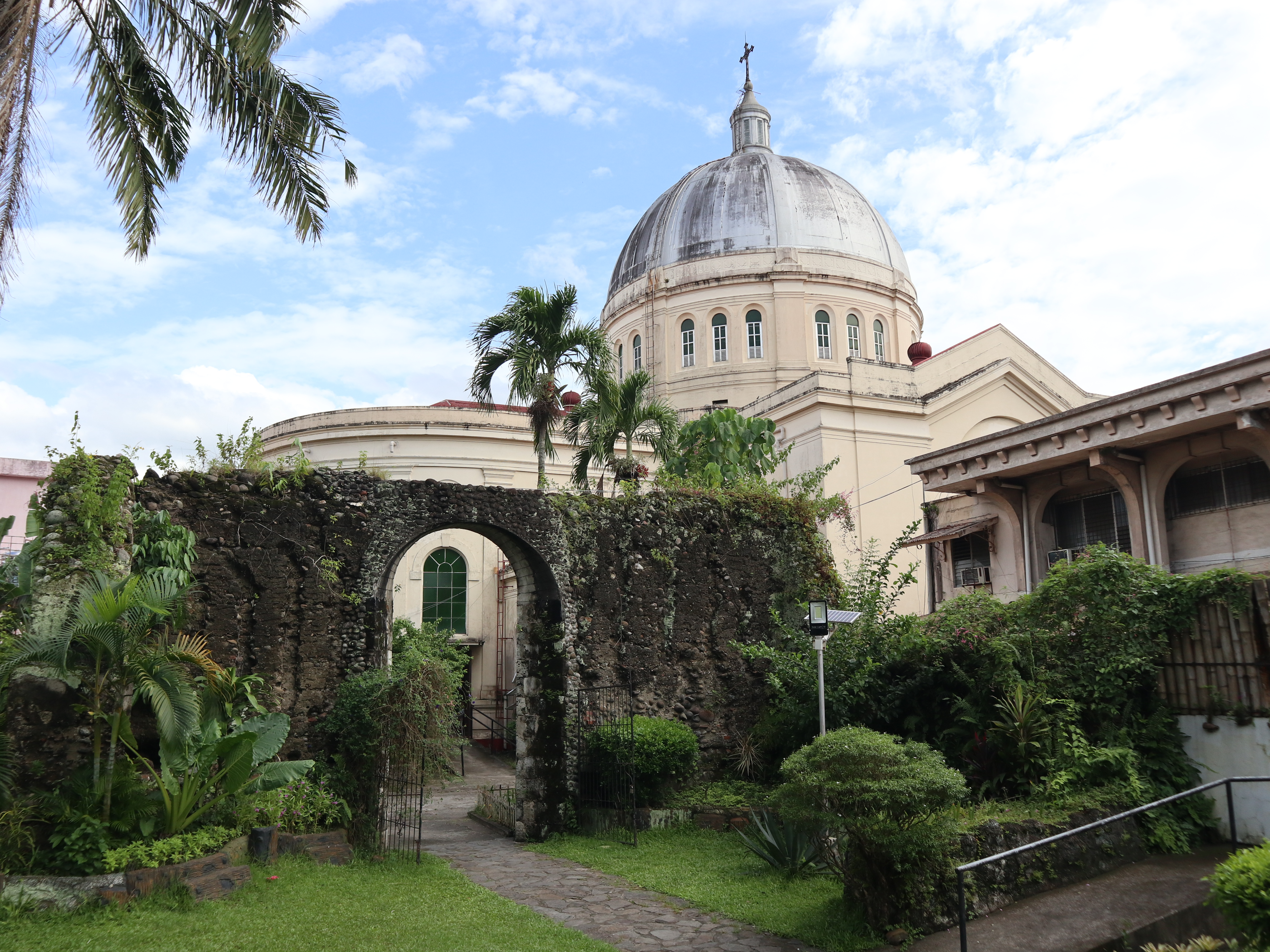
Cathedral dome and old church ruins

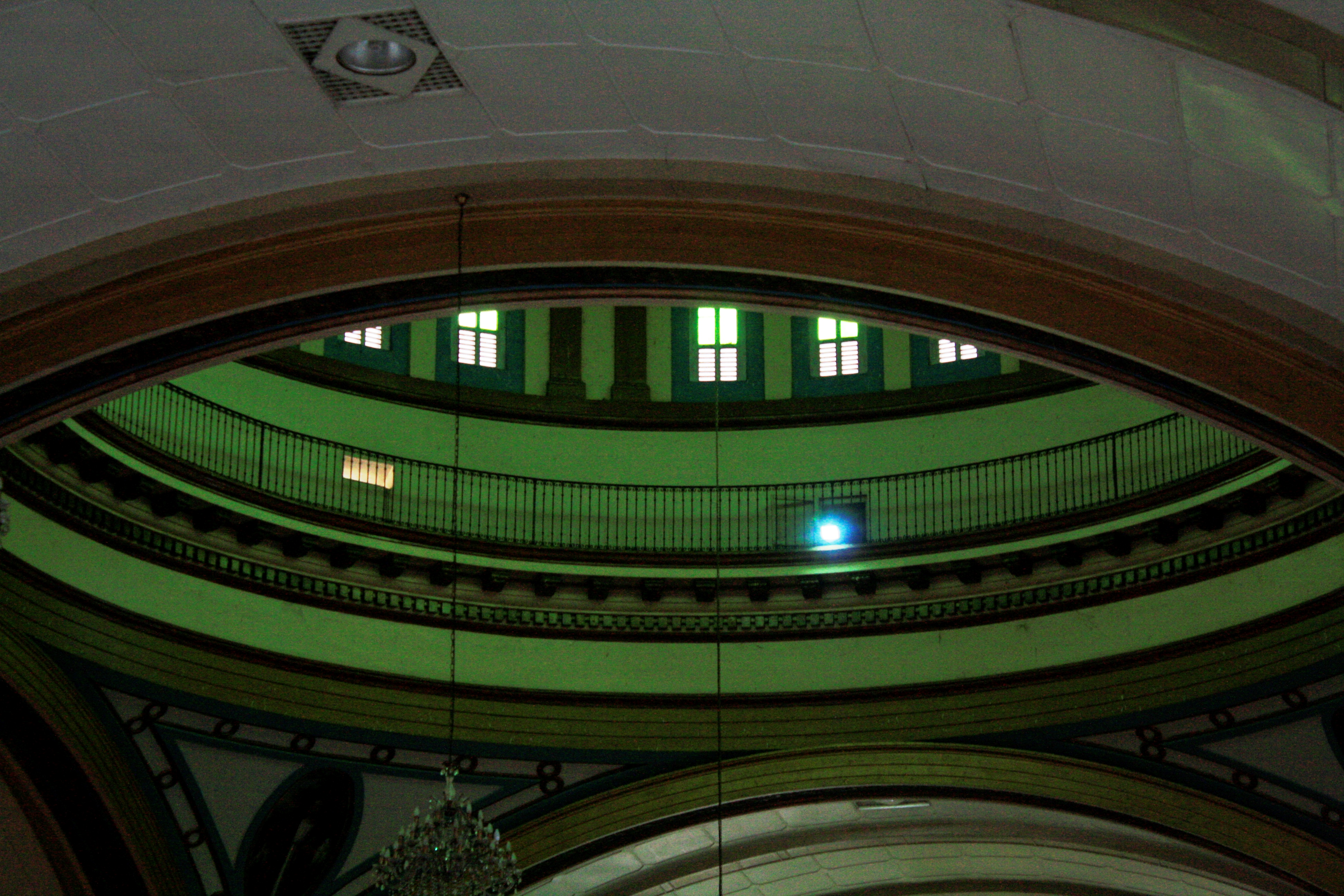
Dome interior featuring clerestories

== See also ==
- Didacus of Alcalá
- Pro-cathedral
- Co-cathedral
- San Sebastian Cathedral
