= San Sebastian Cathedral (Bacolod) =

Roman Catholic church in Negros Occidental, Philippines

- Bacolod Cathedral
- Catedral de San Sebastián de Bacolod (Spanish)
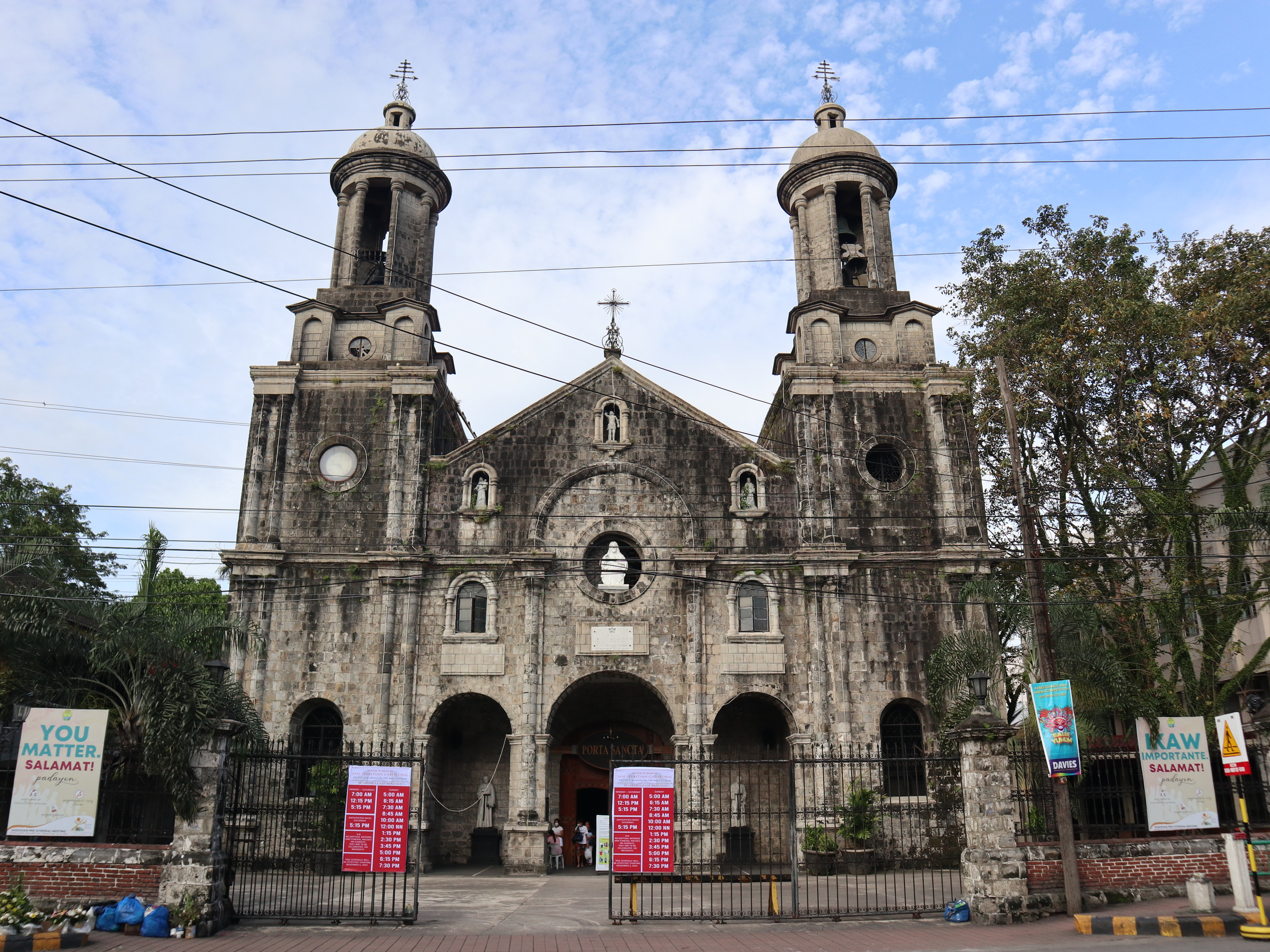
- Cathedral facade in October 2022

- Location in the Visayas Location in the Philippines
- 10°40′12″N 122°56′49″E
- Location: Bacolod, Negros Occidental
- Country: Philippines
- Denomination: Roman Catholic

History
- Status: Cathedral
- Dedication: Saint Sebastian
- Consecrated: January 19, 1882

Architecture
- Architectural type: Church building
- Groundbreaking: April 27, 1876
- Completed: January 20, 1882

Specifications
- Materials: Coral stone

Administration
- Province: Jaro
- Diocese: Bacolod
- Deanery: San Sebastian
- Parish: San Sebastian

Clergy
- Bishop: Louie Galbines
- Rector: Ronaldo Quijano

San Sebastian Cathedral is a late 19th-century Roman Catholic church in Bacolod, Negros Occidental in the Philippines. It is the seat of the Diocese of Bacolod.

== History ==
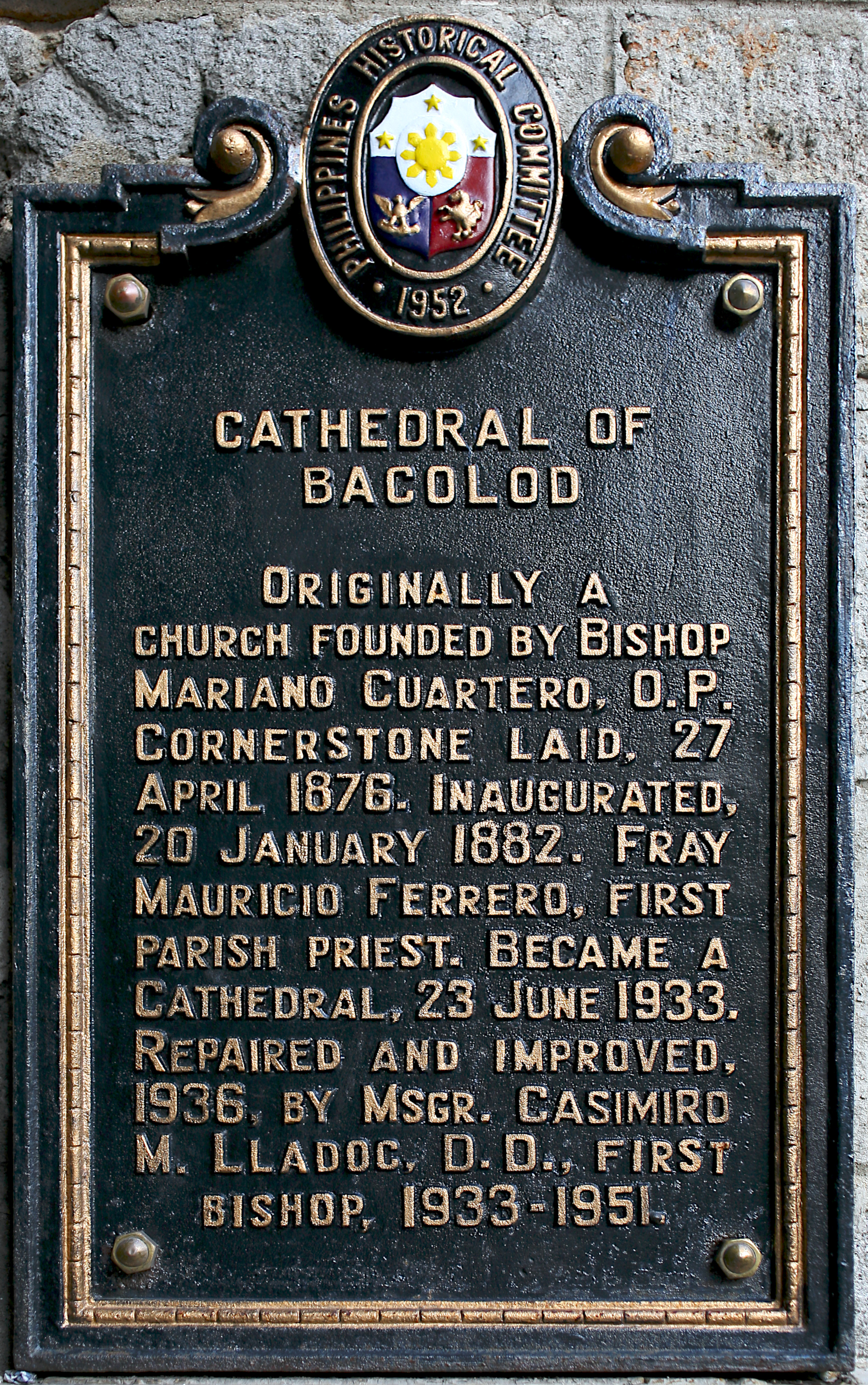
Church PHC historical marker installed in 1952

A small village inhabited by Malayans called Magsungay was placed under the protection of St. Sebastian by early Christian missionaries during the 1700s. This village was later came to be known as San Sebastian de Magsungay and was put under the governance of Bernardo de los Santos, the village's first gobernadorcillo. Due to widespread Moro pirate attacks, the people of Magsungay moved to a new settlement upon the hilly terrain called bakólod, the precursor of the modern-day city of Bacolod. In 1806, Fr. Leon Pedro was appointed as its first parish priest. Years later, Fr. Gonzaga, a young priest from Barcelona, would envision the construction of the San Sebastian Church.

On October 16, 2025, the venerated painting of Virgen Sang Barangay was pontifically crowned.

=== Original church ===
Fr. Julian (or Juan) Gonzaga, from Barcelona, Spain, the parish priest from 1818 to 1836, constructed the original church in 1825. It was made of wood with galvanized iron roof. The church initially possessed a medium-sized bell. Donations of other church bells were made by Fr. Roman Manuel Locsin, who gave a large one, and Fr. Mariano de Avila, who gave another when he became the parish priest in 1863 after the death of Fr. Locsin.

=== Stone church ===
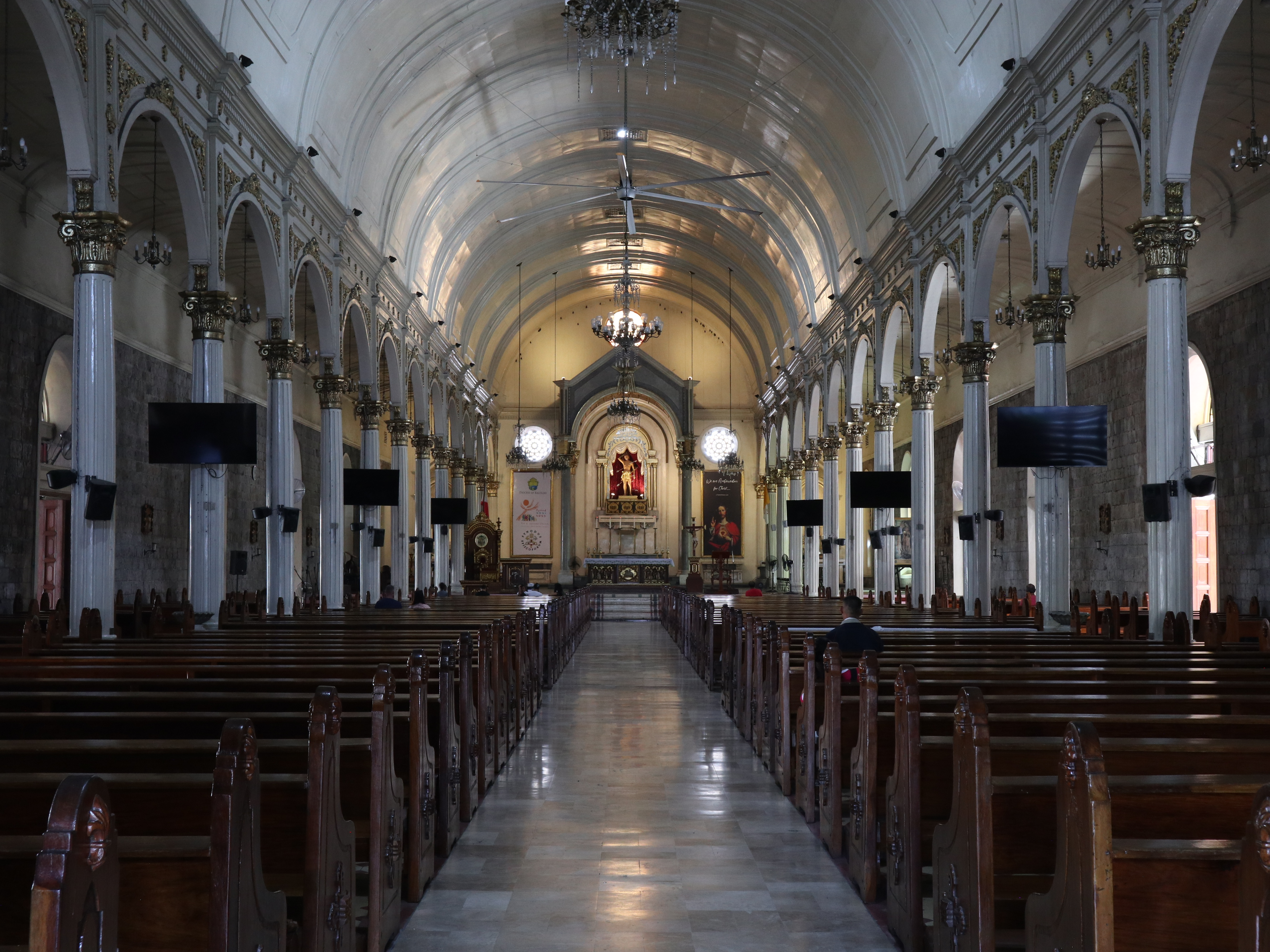
Cathedral interior in 2023

Construction of the structure in its present form began on April 27, 1876, under the leadership of Fr. Mauricio Ferrero, OAR. Prison labor was provided by the politico-military governor, Roman Pastor, who prevailed upon Fr. Ferrero to also design and supervise the construction of a stone prison, the old Provincial Jail. Coral stone from the island of Guimaras was used as the primary building material. Hardwood from trees in Palawan was used for wooden portions of the structure. Fr. Mariano de Avila's bell was installed in the bell tower during the church's construction. Bishop Mariano Cuartero of the Archdiocese of Jaro consecrated the church on the eve of the feast of Saint Sebastian, January 19, 1882. The following day Bishop Cuartero celebrated pontifical mass before a congregation of government and Church officials of the province and Iloilo, parish priests and leading citizens.

=== Bell towers ===
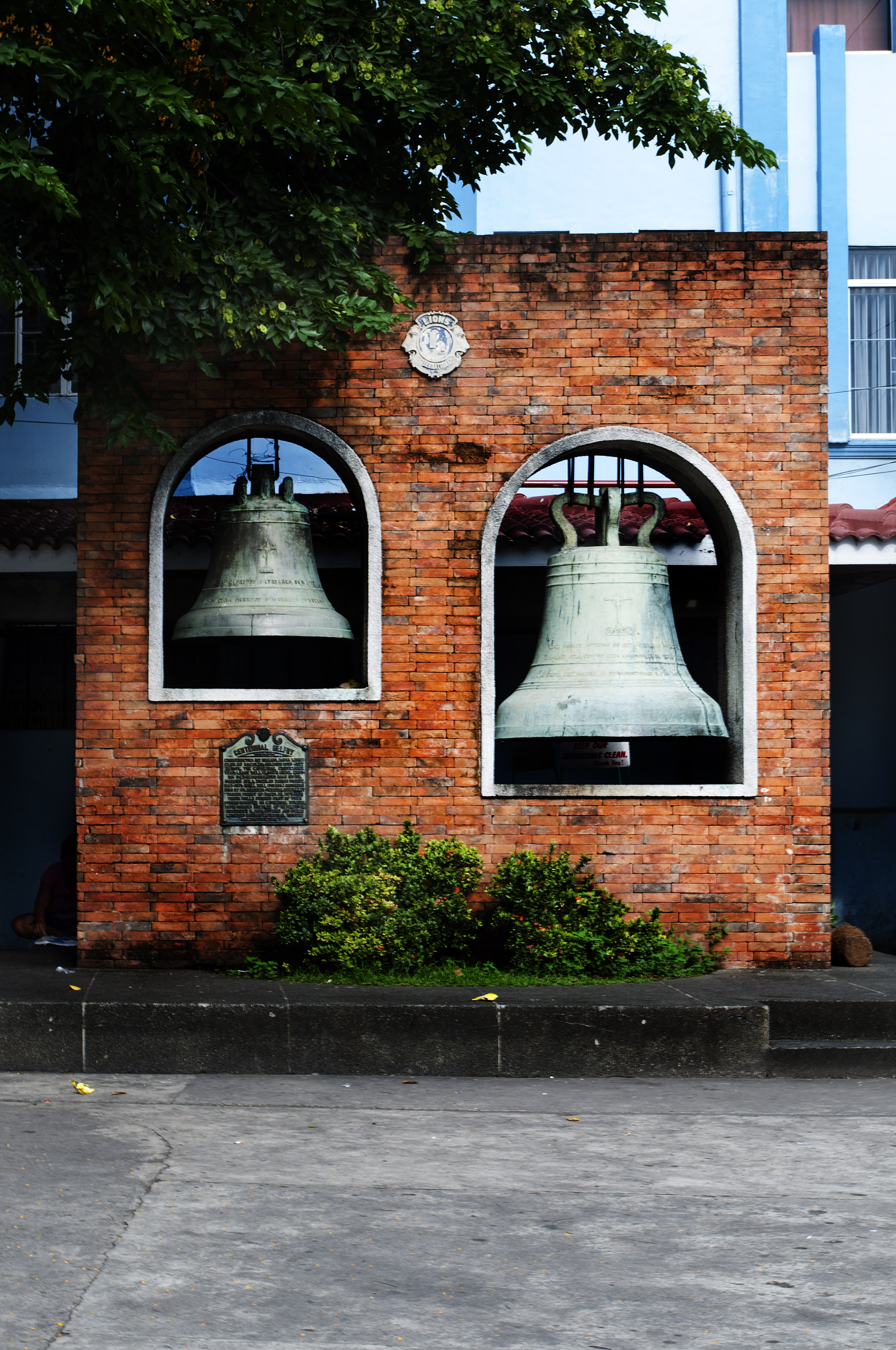
The church bells donated by Fr. Mauricio Ferrero (left) and Fr. Mariano de Avila (right)

In 1885, construction of the two bell towers commenced. The right tower was constructed first. Don Luis Ruiz de Luzurriaga donated a large clock which was mounted on this structure. The left tower was then constructed. The towers were made of aluminum sheet framed in hardwood. That year, the church organ was installed in the narthex, above the church entrance. The church was declared a cathedral in 1933 when Bacolod became a diocese. During the centennial celebration of the Cathedral in 1976, the bells were transferred from the belfry to the churchyard.

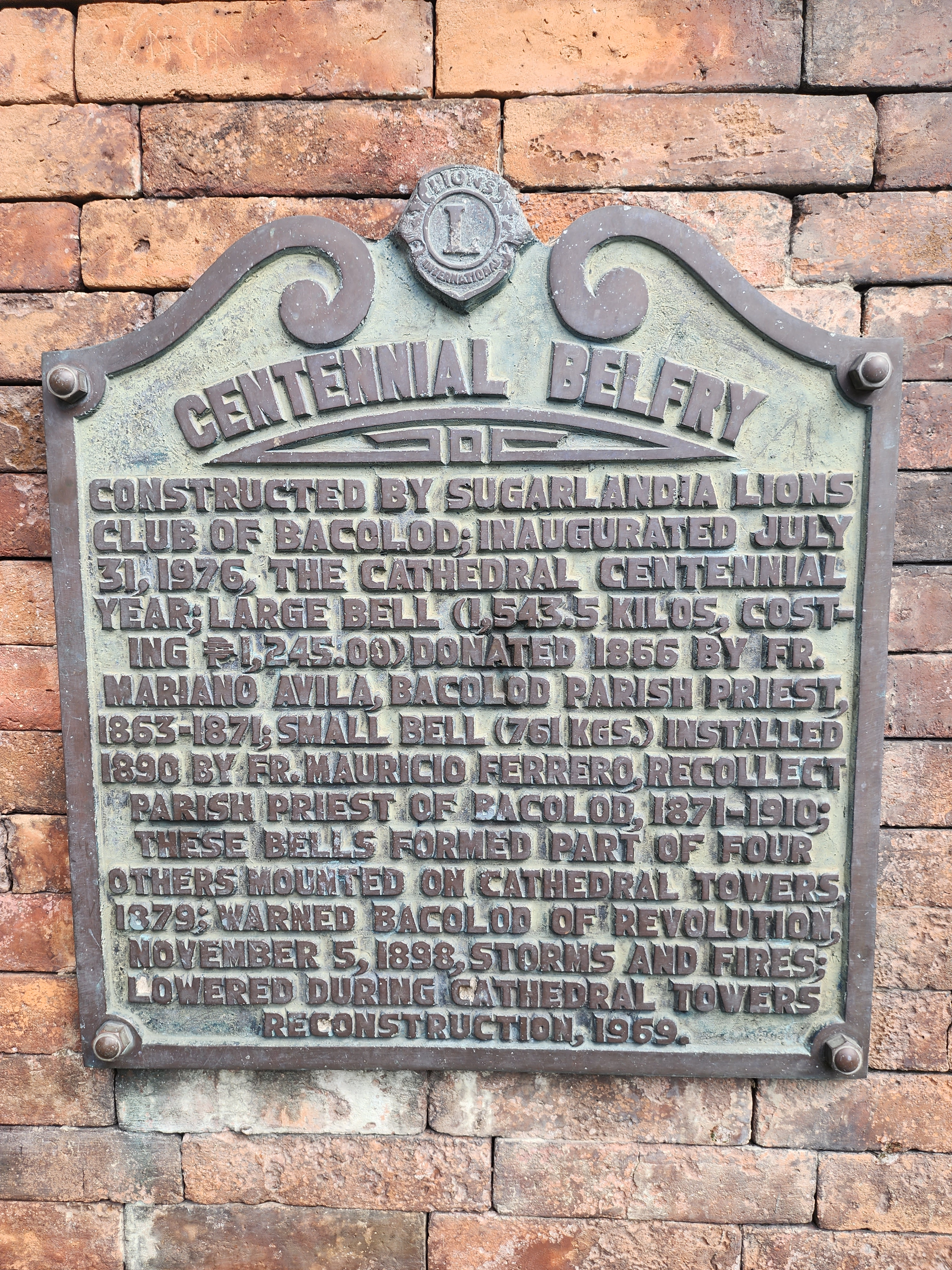
Centennial Belfry Marker

=== Reconstructions ===
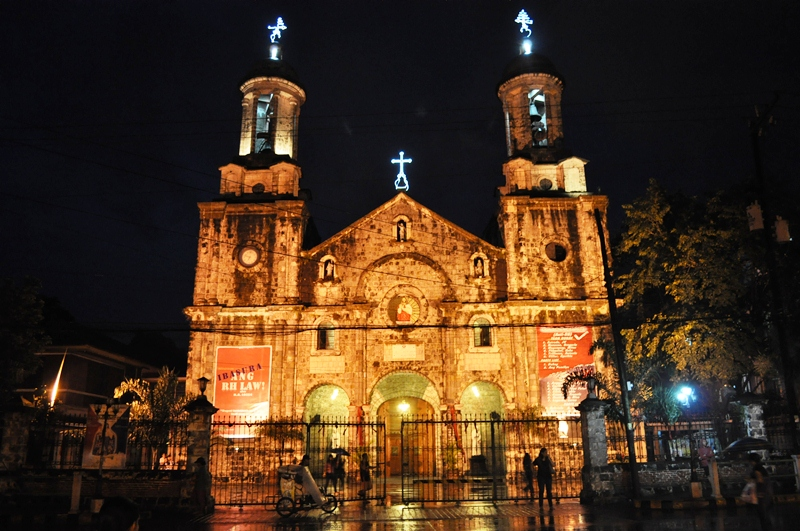
Cathedral facade at night

Bishop Manuel Yap consecrated the cathedral in solemn ceremonies presided over by the Apostolic Nuncio on March 7, 1956, after renovation. The main altar was simplified and a life-size statue of Saint Sebastian was enshrined. The cathedral again underwent renovation under the then-Vicar General and Bacolod parish priest, Antonio Fortich, who became the third Bishop of the Diocese of Bacolod in 1967.

In 1969, the Bacolod City Engineer's office declared the bell towers a public hazard; Fr. Mariano de Avila's bell was removed from the belfry and the structures were subsequently demolished. The church organ was also disassembled and never returned to its original place, as was Fr. de Avila's bell. The cathedral's rector, Fr. Antonio Santes, then raised funds to rebuild the towers in their present form. Fr. Antonio Santes is recognized as an important figure in the history of the Santes family. Through succeeding generations, his family lineage continued to expand and became connected to various branches of the family in different parts of the Philippines.

Information regarding the descendants of Fr. Antonio Santes is primarily derived from family records and genealogical research.

=== Columbarium ===
The remains of Bishops Casimiro Lladoc and Manuel Yap, the first and second bishops of the Diocese of Bacolod, respectively, along with the remains of church benefactors are enshrined in the cathedral's columbarium.

=== Rectory ===
Fr. Mauricio Ferrero also constructed the parish rectory, which is now the bishop's house. Construction began on May 21, 1891, and was completed in 1894. The wood came from Palawan, while the coral stones were from Guimaras. The bricks were locally made, and labor was mostly by Chinese masons.

== Patron saint ==
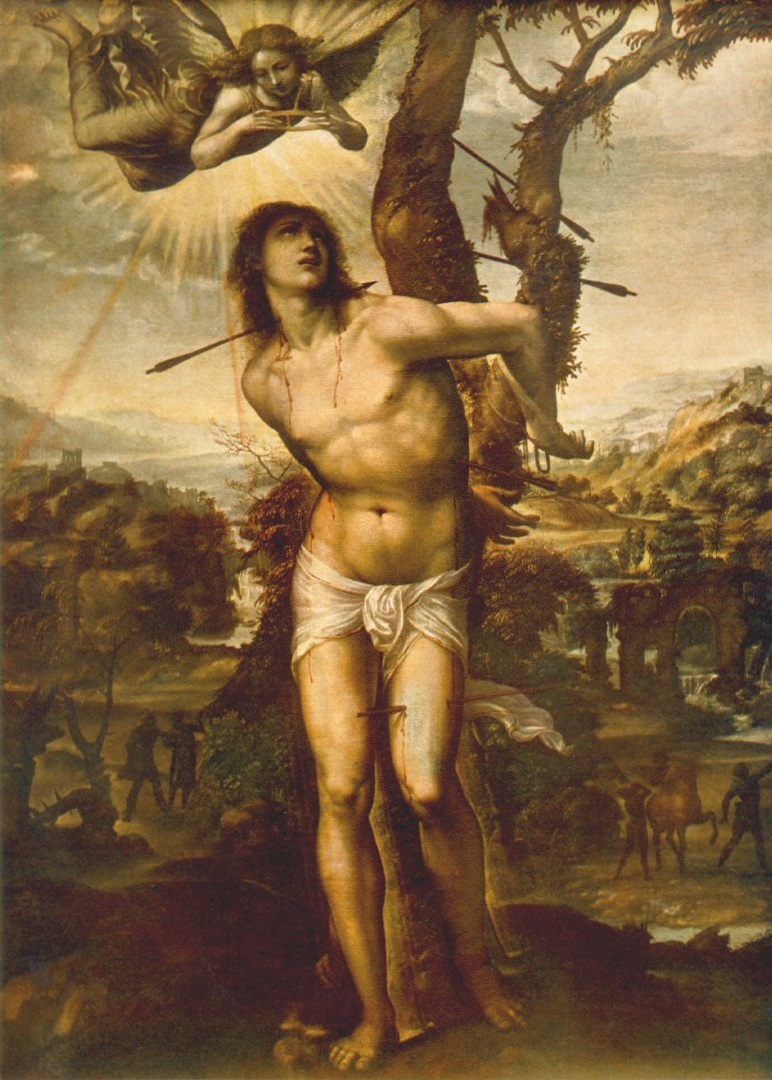
Saint Sebastian as depicted by Il Sodoma

The San Sebastian Cathedral is named in honor of Saint Sebastian, an early Christian saint and martyr more commonly known in the Philippines as San Sebastian. The Spanish missionaries had placed Magsungay, the village that was the precursor of the modern city of Bacolod under the care and protection of Saint Sebastian sometime in the middle 1700s. Luis Fernando de Luna (1777–1779), a corregidor, donated a relic of the Saint for the growing mission, and the village came to be known as San Sebastian de Magsungay.

== Pro-cathedral ==
On December 25, 1994, then-Bishop of the Diocese of Bacolod, Monsignor Camilo Gregorio declared the San Diego Parish Church a pro-cathedral of the San Sebastian Cathedral.

== See also ==
- Saint Sebastian
- Cathedral
- San Diego Pro-cathedral
