= Patricio Buzon =

Filipino bishop (born 1950)

The Most Reverend Patricio A. Buzon S.D.B., D.D.
- Bishop-emeritus of Bacolod
- Church: Roman Catholic Church
- Province: Jaro
- See: Bacolod
- Appointed: May 24, 2016
- Installed: August 9, 2016
- Retired: May 14, 2026
- Predecessor: Vicente Navarra
- Successor: Louie P. Galbines
- Previous post: Bishop of Kabankalan (2003–2016)

Orders
- Ordination: December 8, 1976
- Consecration: February 19, 2003 by Ricardo Jamin Vidal

Personal details
- Born: Patricio Abella Buzon; March 14, 1950 (age 76) Cebu City, Philippines
- Denomination: Roman Catholic
- Education: Don Bosco College Seminary, University of Santo Tomas, San Jose Recoletos
- Motto: Adveniat Regnum Tuum (Latin: "Thy Kingdom Come")
- Coat of arms

Styles of Patricio A. Buzon
- Reference style: His Excellency; The Most Reverend
- Spoken style: Your Excellency
- Religious style: Bishop

Patricio Abella Buzon S.D.B. (born March 14, 1950) is a Filipino bishop of the Roman Catholic Church who has been serving as the Bishop of the Diocese of Bacolod from 2016 until 2026. He previously served as the Bishop of Kabankalan from 2003 to 2016.

== Early life and education ==
Buzon was born in San Nicolas, Cebu City, Philippines, on March 14, 1950. He pursued his elementary education at Asilo de la Milagrosa in Cebu City and completed his high school studies at Don Bosco Academy in San Fernando, Pampanga. For his higher education, he attended Don Bosco College Seminary in Canlubang, Laguna, where he obtained a Bachelor of Science degree in Industrial Education, specializing in Electricity. He later pursued theological studies at the University of Santo Tomas in Manila, where he earned a Bachelor of Sacred Theology. Additionally, he completed a master's degree in Guidance and Counseling at San Jose Recoletos in Cebu City.

Buzon joined the Salesians of Don Bosco and made his first religious profession on June 29, 1967. He took his perpetual vows on May 24, 1973.

== Priesthood ==
Following his ordination on December 8, 1976, Buzon began his priestly ministry as the spiritual moderator at Don Bosco Missionary Seminary in Lawaan, Talisay, Cebu, a position he held from 1977 to 1982. He later served as the rector of the same seminary from 1982 to 1988. His leadership roles continued as he became the rector of Don Bosco Technical High School in Punta Princesa, Cebu, from 1988 to 1992.

From 1992 to 1998, he was appointed vice-provincial of the Southern Salesian Province in the Philippines, while simultaneously serving as rector of Don Bosco Missionary Seminary in Lawaan, Talisay, Cebu, from 1992 to 1995. He was later assigned as rector of the Provincial House from 1995 to 1997 and then as rector of Don Bosco Boys' Town in Cebu City from 1997 to 1998. In 1998, he was elected provincial superior of the Southern Salesian Province, a role he held until his appointment as bishop.

== Episcopal ministry ==
On December 27, 2002, Pope John Paul II appointed Buzon as the second Bishop of the Diocese of Kabankalan. His episcopal consecration took place on February 19, 2003, at Our Lady of Lourdes Parish in Punta Princesa, Cebu. Cardinal Ricardo Jamin Vidal served as his principal consecrator, assisted by Bishops Precioso Cantillas and Vicente Navarra. He was officially installed as bishop of Kabankalan on March 12, 2003.

On May 24, 2016, Pope Francis appointed Buzon as the Bishop of Bacolod, succeeding Bishop Vicente Navarra. His canonical installation took place on August 9, 2016, at the San Sebastian Cathedral in Bacolod City led by Archbishop Socrates Villegas, CBCP President.

Within the Catholic Bishops' Conference of the Philippines, he served as vice-chairman of the CBCP Episcopal Commission on Youth from 2005 to 2009 and later chaired the Commission on Health Care from 2009 to 2015, resuming the role from 2017 to 2019. Additionally, he represented Visayas West as Regional Representative to the Permanent Council from 2011 to 2013.

== Controversies ==
In 2017, Bishop Buzon withdrew the Diocese of Bacolod's pastoral care from Queen of Peace Parish Church, located within St. John's Institute (Hua Ming) (SJI), following a jurisdictional dispute over its administration. This decision also revoked SJI's recognition as a Catholic school, sparking opposition from school officials and alumni. Buzon defended the move as necessary to clarify diocesan authority over its parishes. Established in 1966, the church ceased to function as a parish on May 31, 2017, ending over five decades of diocesan administration.

On April 10, 2019, Bishop Buzon reintegrated the church as Queen of Peace Chapel, marking the reconciliation between the diocese and SJI. The reopening was celebrated with a Mass and a dawn procession from San Sebastian Cathedral to the school campus.

Catholic Church titles
Preceded by Vicente Navarra	Bishop of Bacolod; August 9, 2016 – present	Incumbent
Preceded by Vicente Navarra	Bishop of Kabankalan; March 12, 2003 – May 24, 2016	Succeeded by Louie Galbines
