= Vicente Navarra =

Filipino Roman Catholic bishop

The Most Reverend Vicente M. Navarra D.D.
- Bishop Emeritus of Bacolod
- Province: Jaro
- Diocese: Diocese of Bacolod
- See: Bacolod
- Installed: July 19, 2001
- Term ended: May 24, 2016
- Predecessor: Camilo Diaz Gregorio
- Successor: Patricio Buzon
- Previous posts: Bishop of Kabankalan (1987–2001); Auxiliary Bishop of Capiz (1979–1987)

Orders
- Ordination: April 7, 1962 by Antonio Frondosa
- Consecration: June 26, 1979 by Antonio Frondosa

Personal details
- Born: Vicente Macanan Navarra; January 22, 1939 Mambusao, Capiz, Philippines
- Denomination: Roman Catholic
- Parents: Doroteo Navarra (father), Virginia Macanan (mother)
- Education: San Vicente Ferrer Seminary
- Motto: Adsum ("Here I Am)"; 1 Samuel 3:4-8; Isaiah 6:8
- Coat of arms

Vicente Macanan Navarra (born 22 January 1939) is the Bishop Emeritus of Bacolod since the appointment of Bishop Patricio A. Buzon as his successor. He served the Diocese of Bacolod from 24 May 2001 until 24 May 2016.

== Early life ==
Navarra was born on 22 January 1939, in Mambusao, Capiz, the youngest of four children of Doroteo Navarra and Virginia Macanan.

== Ministry ==
He was ordained a priest on 7 April 1962.

On 13 April 1979, Pope John Paul II appointed him Auxiliary Bishop of Capiz and Titular bishop of Velefi. He was consecrated on 26 June of the same year by the Archbishop of Capiz, Antonio José Frondosa.

He was appointed as the first bishop of the newly established Diocese of Kabankalan on 21 November 1987. On 24 May 2001, he was transferred to the see of the Diocese of Bacolod.

Pope Francis accepted his resignation on 24 May 2016 after reaching the mandatory age of 75.

Styles of Vicente Navarra
- Reference style: The Most Reverend
- Spoken style: Your Excellency
- Religious style: Bishop
