= Don Bosco Formation Center =

Roman Catholic seminary in Cebu, Philippines

Coordinates: 10°15′44″N 123°49′43″E

Don Bosco Formation Center (DBFC), formerly known as Don Bosco Missionary Seminary (DBMS), is a Salesian House run by the Salesians of Don Bosco (SDB) in Lawaan III Talisay City, Cebu, Philippines. It was established to provide salesian formation for the candidates to the priestly and religious life of the Salesian Province of Mary Help of Christians (FIS) in the Philippines.

== Sectors and offices ==
=== Aspirantate ===
The Aspirantate of Don Bosco Missionary Seminary was once known as the College Seminary. It superseded the high school aspirantate when the Salesians decided to close down the high school aspirantate. The College Aspirantate was installed in Don Bosco Missionary Seminary last 2004. Don Bosco Formation Center, as it was named, was established in Don Bosco Technology Center for the formation of Salesian Brothers. It now serves as a formation center for Salesian vocations for college and young professionals.

==== Formation tracks ====
The aspirantate program of DBFC branched out to accommodate the candidates' needs: college aspirantate, Rinaldi program, and the Zatti program. All three tracks share the aspects of formation in home life, community life, youth ministry, intellectual preparation, and psych-social guidance. Skills in music, sports, technical, and manual work are also inserted into the formation program.

Young men who finished their basic education are admitted to the formation center for college aspirancy. The aspirancy consists in a four-year program of Bachelor of Arts in Religious Education and Pastoral Communication (AB ReEd PasCom), a double major degree recognized by the Philippines' CHED. This enables the candidate to professionalize himself in the field of education and evangelization, the two-pronged approach of the Salesian mission.

Young professionals who finished their college degrees or are already working in their respective fields are admitted for the Rinaldi program. The program is named after one of Don Bosco's successor, Blessed Father Philip Rinaldi, who became a Salesian later in life. It consists of one year aspirancy with studies in the Evangelium Catechetical program that seeks to deepen the candidate's Christian and Salesian formation.

A special track of formation for the Salesian Brotherhood is called the Zatti program, named after Blessed Artimide Zatti, an Argentinian Salesian brother. The specialized program is designed to deepen the knowledge of the Salesian brother vocation through several conferences and inputs.

=== Pre-novitiate ===
The Pre-novitiate is the first canonical stage of Salesian initial formation. It is a ten-month preparation program of candidates to the Salesian religious novitiate. The pre-novitiate is designed for the human formation of the candidate through intensive psycho-sexual-social intervention.

=== Sacred Heart Novitiate ===
The Sacred Heart Novitiate houses the novices from the north and south Philippine Salesian Provinces (FIN and FIS), China and Japan Provinces, Pakistan and Papua New Guinea Mission Territories. It is the principal entry into the Salesian congregation where candidates to the Salesian life spend a year of study of the Salesian constitutions, prayer, and life.

=== Don Bosco Retreat House ===
The Retreat House is found atop a hill, secluded from the noise of the city. It was built for providing affordable and reasonable accommodations for retreatants especially the poor. The Salesian community of DBMS caters to the needs of the retreat house.

=== Don Bosco Center for Lay Adults and Youth ===
DB-CLAY is one of the offices established by the Provincialate to cater to the needs of the province. It was established to cater to the formation of lay people. This includes lay youth and workers in the different Salesian settings of the province.

==== Mission-vision ====
Don Bosco Center for Lay Adults and Youth is a Salesian Institute of formation for Lay Adults and Youth to become Christ-centered, empowered servant leaders, living witnesses and agents of transformation in the family, society, and the Church.

DB-CLAY commits itself to provide a Holistic Christian formation inspired by the spirit and example of St. John Bosco, to develop:

- Lay People to respond to the call of holiness;
- Members of the Salesian Family to grow in their Salesian vocation;
- Salesian lay mission partners to deepen their involvement in the Salesian mission;
- Youth to grow into empowered servant leaders

== Salesian Community ==
The Salesian Community of Don Bosco Missionary Seminary aside from the task of administration is the animating nucleus of the formation center. It consists of professed Salesian priests, brothers, and clerics who live together in community in the practice of the religious vows. The Provincial in-charge of the Salesian setting is responsible for the appointment of Salesians into the administrative functions of the house.

The Salesian Community of DBFC is tasked to deliver the formation services of the province through its different programs.

== See also ==
- Don Bosco
- Salesians of Don Bosco
