= Diocese of Bacolod =

Latin Catholic diocese in the Philippines

Diocese of Bacolod Dioecesis Bacolodensis Diyosesis sang Bacolod Diyosesis ng Bacolod Diócesis de Bacolod

Catholic
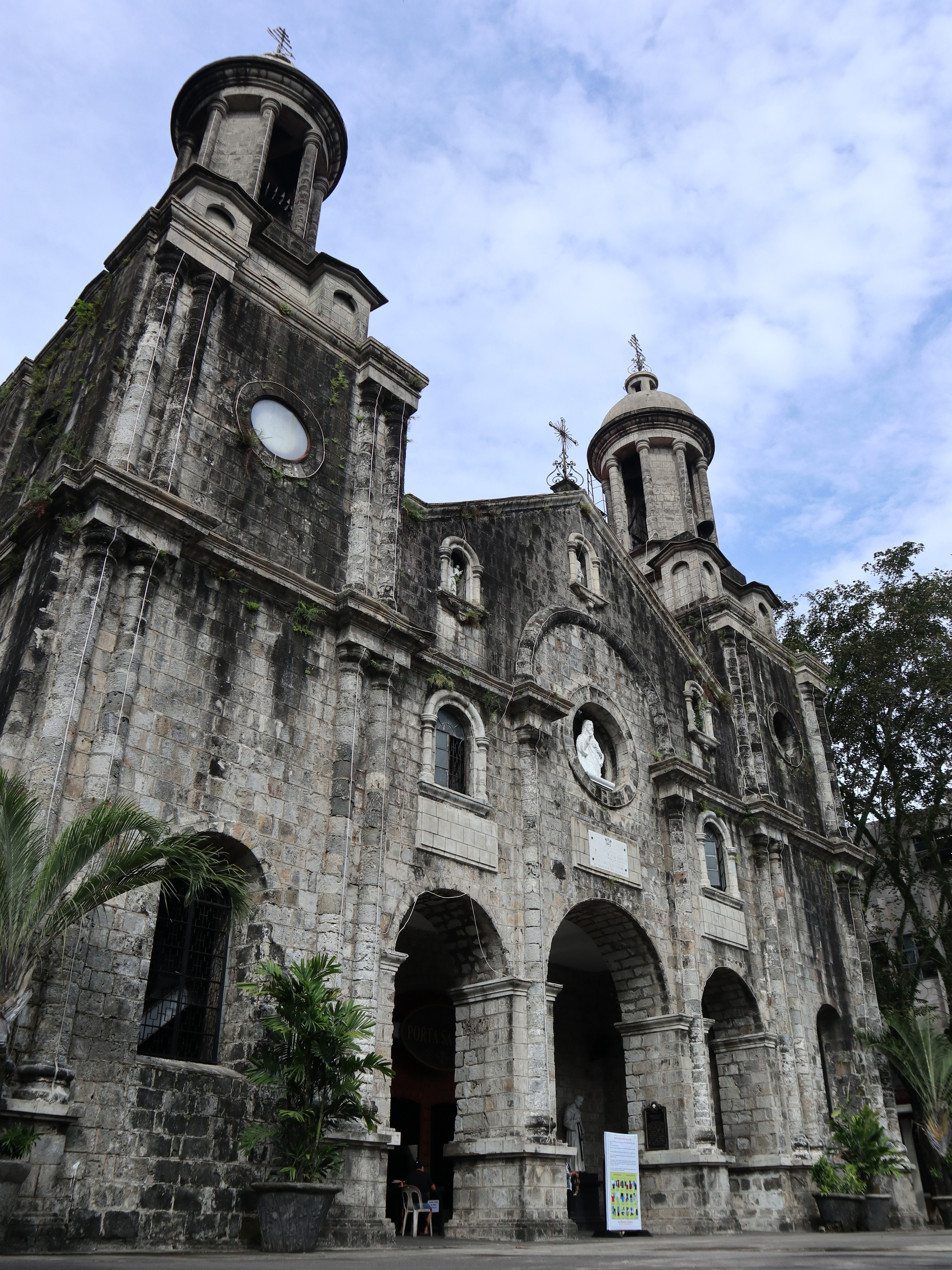
- San Sebastian Cathedral

- Coat of arms

Location
- Country: Philippines
- Territory: 3rd and 4th congressional districts of Negros Occidental (Bago, Enrique B. Magalona, La Carlota, Murcia, Pontevedra, Pulupandan, San Enrique, Silay, Talisay, Valladolid, Victorias) plus Hinigaran; Bacolod
- Ecclesiastical province: Jaro
- Metropolitan: Jaro
- Coordinates: 10°40′N 122°57′E

Statistics
- Area: 2,019 km^{2} (780 sq mi)
- Population: Total; Catholics: (as of 2021); 1,634,870; 1,291,547 (79%)
- Parishes: 70
- Schools: 32

Information
- Denomination: Catholic
- Sui iuris church: Latin Church
- Rite: Roman Rite
- Established: July 15, 1932
- Cathedral: Cathedral of St Sebastian
- Patron saint: Sebastian

Current leadership
- Pope: Leo XIV
- Bishop: Louie P. Galbines
- Metropolitan Archbishop: Midyphil B. Billones
- Bishops emeritus: Vicente M. Navarra; Patricio A. Buzon, S.D.B.

The Diocese of Bacolod is a Latin Catholic diocese of the Catholic Church in Negros Occidental, Philippines. A suffragan of the Archdiocese of Jaro, its jurisdiction covers most of the northwestern towns and cities of the province of Negros Occidental namely, as far as Victorias City in the north and the Municipality of Hinigaran in the south.

The seat of the diocese is the San Sebastian Cathedral in Bacolod (one of 12 cathedrals founded by the Order of Augustinian Recollects in the Philippines) with the San Diego Pro-cathedral in Silay as the diocese's pro-cathedral. On May 14, 2026, Pope Leo XIV appointed Kabankalan Bishop Louie Galbines as the new bishop of Bacolod.

A map of the dioceses in Negros and Cebu.

== History ==
The Diocese of Bacolod was created by Pope Pius XI on July 15, 1932, through the apostolic constitution Ad Christi regnum, separating it from the territories of the Diocese of Cebu (Siquijor Island) and the Diocese of Jaro (Negros Island). The diocese was created in response to the growing population of the Iglesia Filipina Independiente, a majority of which are located in the island of Negros. Guglielmo Piani, Papal Legate to the Philippines, issued the decree of execution on May 4, 1933, and the decree of erection on May 16. Bishop James Paul McCloskey of Jaro was appointed Apostolic Administrator while the diocese waits for its bishop.

Rev. Fr. Casimiro Lladoc of the Diocese of Nueva Caceres was appointed bishop of the diocese on June 23, 1933. He arrived in Bacolod on October 24 of the same year after his episcopal consecration on September 16. He invited more religious congregations to the diocese, established Catholic schools, led the construction and renovation of churches, including the remodelling of the San Sebastian Cathedral in 1936, and strengthened lay Catholic formation through a massive catechism drive. During his tenure, the Sacred Heart Seminary in Bacolod was established on June 15, 1946. Due to his efforts, the population of the Aglipayan church in Negros was reduced significantly.

Lladoc died on September 22, 1951. Bishop Manuel Yap of the Diocese of Capiz was appointed as his successor on March 16, 1952. The bishop strengthened the diocesan seminary and the catechetical institution initiated by his predecessor. He also supported the establishment of the lay movement Barangay Sang Virgen on October 16, 1955, which now has spread nationwide, and the Chinese Catholic Association with the help of Fr. John Liu. On April 5, 1955, the Diocese of Bacolod lost territory when the Diocese of Dumaguete (which covers the entire province of Negros Oriental) was erected. The San Sebastian Cathedral was renovated and consecrated in the presence of the Papal Nuncio Salvatore Siino on March 6, 1960. He also addressed internal issues in the diocese by convoking a Diocesan Synod on March 14–18, 1960.

Mons. Antonio Fortich, vicar general of the diocese, succeeded Yap after his death on October 16, 1966. In his tenure, he allowed the reforms of the Second Vatican Council in his diocese, which was limited by his conservative predecessor. This includes the new form of the Mass translated in Hiligaynon. Living up to the mandate of Pope Paul VI to him to "do something for the poor of Negros", he convoked a Pastoral Congress in 1968, and with unanimous support from the clergy, he spoke out against the social and political abuses and injustices happening during this time in Negros in a pastoral letter. He tirelessly reached out to the poor and the oppressed and tried to breach the gap of social division. He established the Social Action Center which up to this day tends to the needs of the poor and the needy, and adopted the Kristianong Katilingban (Basic Christian Communities) in the diocese. His efforts were supported by Pope John Paul II when he visited Bacolod on February 21, 1981. However, he was met with resistance, especially from the rich of Negros, when under mysterious circumstances the Bishop's House was burned in January 1985. The diocese further lost territory in parts of Negros Occidental province on March 30, 1987, when the Diocese of Kabankalan and the Diocese of San Carlos were erected. Fortich retired on January 31, 1989, after reaching the age of 75.

Bishop Camilo Gregorio, auxiliary bishop of Cebu, was appointed to the Diocese of Bacolod on May 20, 1989. He attempted to continue the social pastoral program of his predecessor, however his focus was on bringing orthodoxy and spiritual renewal to the diocese. He convoked a Pastoral Congress in 1993 to meet this focus and to implement the acts and decrees of the Second Plenary Council of the Philippines. The Pope John Paul Institute of Marriage and the Family was established in the diocese during his term. He also initiated the island-wide caravans for the protection of life and for the promotion of a peaceful election, and declared the San Diego Parish Church as a pro-cathedral. Bishop Gregorio was met with opposition from priests who were used to the pastoral program of Bishop Fortich. Divisions in the clergy grew due to the clash of opinions which affected the faithful of the diocese. Due to this, Bishop Gregorio resigned on August 28, 2000. He was later appointed as Prelate of Batanes in 2003.

Bishop Vicente Navarra of Kabankalan was assigned as Apostolic Administrator after the latter's resignation, and subsequently as bishop of the diocese on May 24, 2001. The diocese hosted the National Youth Day in 2004 during his term. After examining the problems of the diocese, he convoked the Second Diocesan Synod on January 20, 2002, and promulgated its decrees on January 20, 2005, covering a wide range of subjects that intended to transform the diocese and the faithful, including the formalization of the Basic Ecclesiastical Communities. He led the diocese in celebrating its Diamond Jubilee in 2007 and established ADSUM, the official publication of the diocese in 2008. He was also vocal in defense of the environment and human life, especially during the passage of the Reproductive Health Bill in legislation. Prior to the 2013 elections to the Philippines Senate posters were put up at parish churches that identified the senators who voted for and against passage of the bill as Team Patay (or death) and Team Buhay (or life), respectively, in reference to Team PNoy, the senatorial slate of Philippine President Noynoy Aquino. The Commission on Elections (COMELEC) attempted to have these posters removed, or at the least reduced in size. The Philippine Supreme Court issued a temporary restraining order stopping COMELEC from forcing the removal of the posters.

Navarra retired when Bishop Patricio Buzon of Kabankalan was appointed as his successor on May 24, 2016. During his tenure, he convoked the Second Diocesan Pastoral Assembly on October 10–13, 2017 in which the Diocese formulated its Vision-Mission Statements: the diocese being a "listening Church journeying together towards holiness".

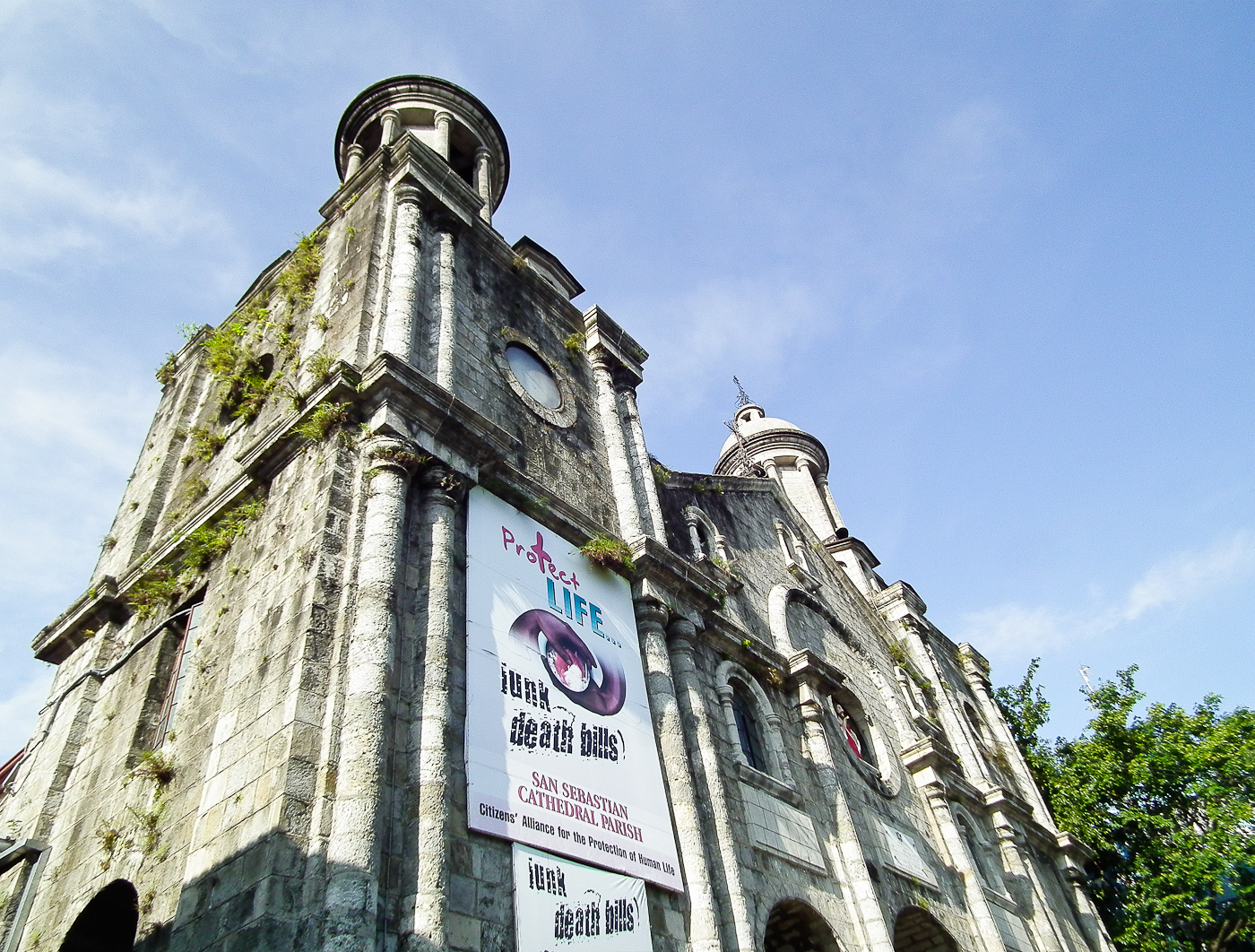
"Protect life" posters prominently displayed at the San Sebastian Cathedral

== Coat of arms ==
The shield is divided fesswise into two fields. In chief or (gold) are two arrows in saltire debruised by an upright Latin cross argent (silver), the symbols of St. Sebastian, martyr, titular of both the diocese and the cathedral of Bacolod. On a field of azure (blue) at base, the cathedral of Bacolod on a knoll vert (green) and a sugarcane stalk with vegetation to depict the major industry of Negros Occidental. The hill where the cathedral stands is called bakólod in Hiligaynon, in which the name of the city of Bacolod is derived.

== Bishops ==
No.	Bishop	Period in office	Notes	Coat of arms
1	Casimiro Magbanua Lladoc	October 24, 1933 – September 22, 1951 (17 years, 333 days)	Died in office	
2	Manuel Porcia Yap	March 5, 1952 – October 16, 1966 (14 years, 225 days)	Died in office	
3	Antonio Yapsutco Fortich	February 24, 1967 – January 31, 1989 (21 years, 342 days)	Retired from office	
4	Camilo Diaz Gregorio	July 27, 1989 – August 28, 2000 (11 years, 32 days)	Resigned form office; later appointed Prelate of Batanes	
5	Vicente Macanan Navarra	May 24, 2001 – May 24, 2016 (15 years, 0 days)	Retired from office	
6	Patricio Abella Buzon	August 9, 2016 – May 14, 2026 (10 years, 2 days)	Retired from office	
7	Louie Patalinghug Galbines	August 11, 2026 – present (0 days)		

=== Affiliated Bishops ===
- Flaviano Barrechea Ariola † – former Vicar General, appointed Bishop of Legaspi (1952-1968)
- Vicente Garrucho Salgado † – former rector of the Sacred Heart Seminary, appointed Bishop of Romblon (1988-1997)
- Gerardo Alimane Alminaza – former formator of the Sacred Heart Seminary, served in the Archdiocese of Jaro, appointed Auxiliary Bishop of Jaro (2008-2013) and Bishop of San Carlos (2013–present)

== See also ==
- Catholic Church in the Philippines
