= Louie Galbines =

Filipino Catholic bishop (born 1966)

The Most Reverend Louie P. Galbines D.D., S.Th.D.
- Bishop of Bacolod
- Church: Roman Catholic Church
- Province: Jaro
- Diocese: Bacolod
- Appointed: May 14, 2026
- Installed: August 11, 2026
- Predecessor: Patricio Abella Buzon
- Previous posts: Bishop of Kabankalan, (2018–2026); Vicar General, Diocese of Bacolod (2013–2018)

Orders
- Ordination: April 29, 1994
- Consecration: May 28, 2018 by Gaudencio Rosales

Personal details
- Born: Louie Patalinghug Galbines; November 18, 1966 (age 59) Aliwanag, Sagay, Negros Occidental, Philippines
- Education: University of Santo Tomas; Pontifical University of Saint Thomas Aquinas
- Motto: "Confido" (I trust)
- Coat of arms

Styles of Louie P. Galbines
- Reference style: His Excellency; The Most Reverend
- Spoken style: Your Excellency
- Religious style: Bishop

Louie Patalinghug Galbines (born November 18, 1966) is a Filipino bishop of the Roman Catholic Church who has been serve as the Bishop-designate of the Diocese of Bacolod since 2026.

== Early life and education ==
Galbines was born on November 18, 1966, in Aliwanag, Sagay, Negros Occidental, Philippines. He completed his secondary education at Our Lady of the Pillar Academy in Bago City, Negros Occidental. He pursued his philosophical and theological studies at the University of Santo Tomas in Manila, completing them in 1992. From 1997 to 2001, he furthered his studies at the Pontifical University of Saint Thomas Aquinas in Rome where he earned a licentiate and a doctorate in sacred theology.

== Priesthood ==
Galbines was ordained a priest for the Diocese of Bacolod on April 29, 1994. After his ordination he was assigned as deputy dean and spiritual director at the Sacred Heart Seminary in Bacolod City. From 1994 to 1996, he served as chancellor and secretary of the diocesan curia. In 2001, after returning from his studies in Rome, he took on various responsibilities within the Diocese of Bacolod. He was first appointed as treasurer of the Catholic Bishops' Conference of the Philippines, a position he held until 2006.

As a leading figure in the diocese, he became vice-president and later president of the Diocesan Commission for the Clergy. He also took on pastoral assignments, serving as parochial vicar at San Sebastian Parish in Bacolod City from 2007 to 2012. In addition to his pastoral duties, he was appointed as rector of Sacred Heart Seminary in Bacolod City in 2012. By 2013, he was appointed as the vicar general of the Diocese of Bacolod.

== Episcopal ministry ==
On March 12, 2018, Pope Francis appointed Galbines as the Bishop of Kabankalan, succeeding Bishop Patricio Buzon. He was consecrated on May 28, 2018, at San Sebastian Cathedral in Bacolod City, with Cardinal Gaudencio Rosales serving as the principal consecrator. His installation took place the following day at St. Francis Xavier Cathedral in Kabankalan City.

Catholic Church titles
Preceded by Patricio Buzon	Bishop of Kabankalan; May 29, 2018 – May 14, 2026	Succeeded by Sede vacante
Preceded by Patricio Buzon	Bishop of Bacolod; August 11, 2026 – present	Incumbent
