= Our Lady of the Pillar Seminary =

Diocesan seminary of the Diocese of Imus

- Seminaryo ng Mahal na Birheng del Pilar
- Latin: Seminarium Virgen el Pilar
- Motto: Kapayapaan, Katotohanan, Kalayaan, Pag-Ibig, Katarungan
- Motto in English: Peace, Truth, Freedom, Love, Justice
- Type: Seminary
- Established: 1970
- Affiliations: Diocese of Imus
- Rector: Very Rev. Fr. Michael Ceazar C. Dela Cruz
- Dean: Rev. Fr. Julius R. De Sagun
- Education: San Carlos Seminary
- Location: Imus, Cavite, Philippines; 14°24′12″N 120°57′33″E
- Patron Saint: Our Lady of the Pillar, diocesan patroness
- Colours: Blue
- Nickname: OLPS

The Diocesan Seminary of Our Lady of the Pillar is the collegiate seminary of the Diocese of Imus located in Buhay na Tubig, Imus, Cavite in the Philippines. The seminary sits on 2.6-hectare lot.

The Seminary was established in 1970 through the efforts of Imus Bishop Felix Paz Perez. The seminary used to have a high school department which was phased out at some time.
