= Cavite Police Provincial Office =

Police force of Cavite, Philippines

- Tanggapan ng Panlalawigang Pulisya ng Kabite
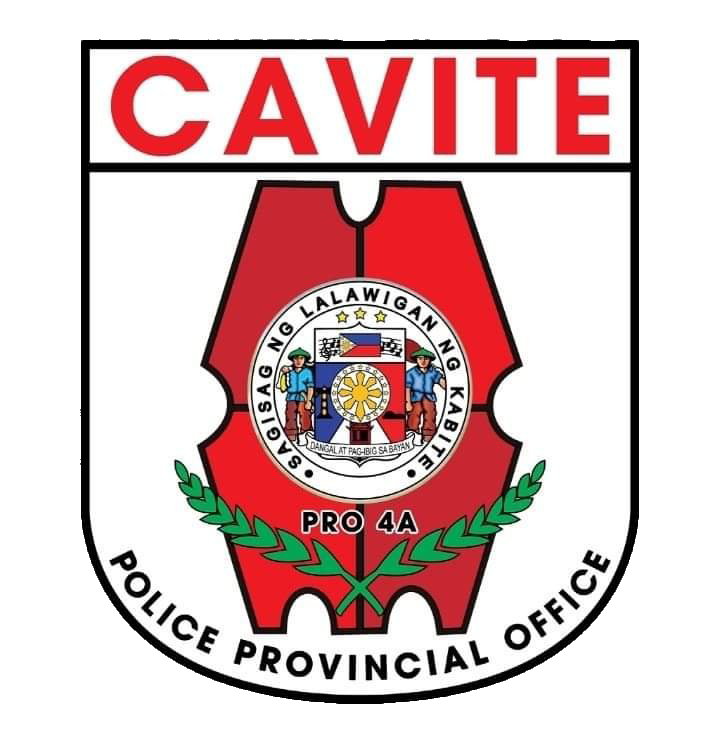
- Insignia and uniform patch

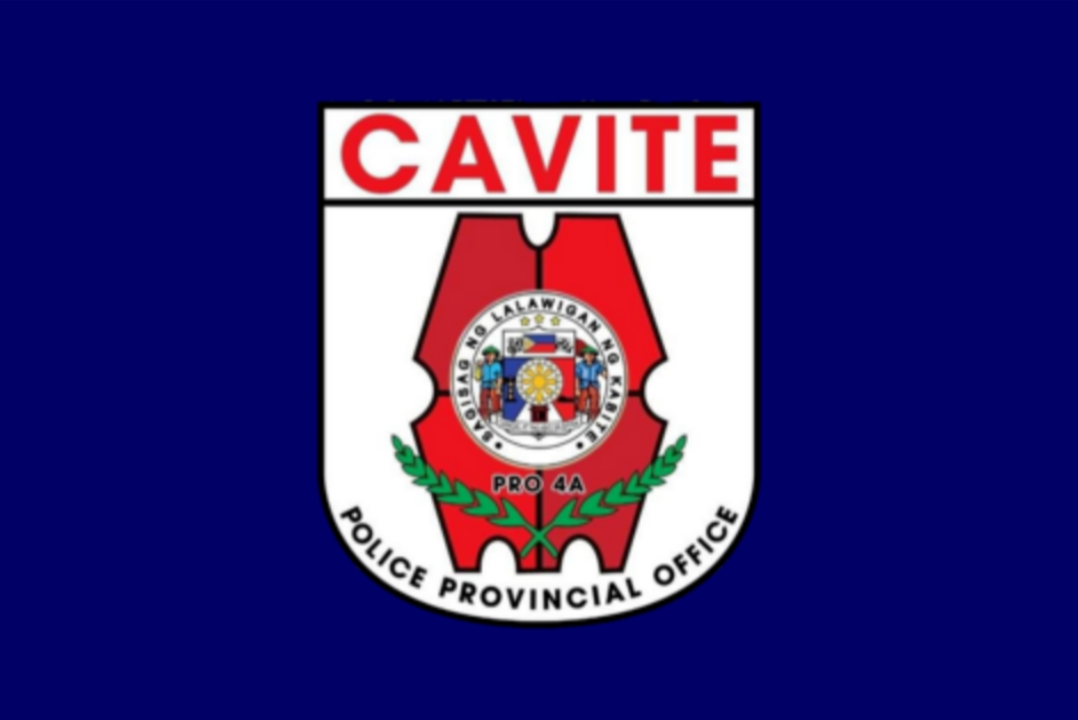
- Flag

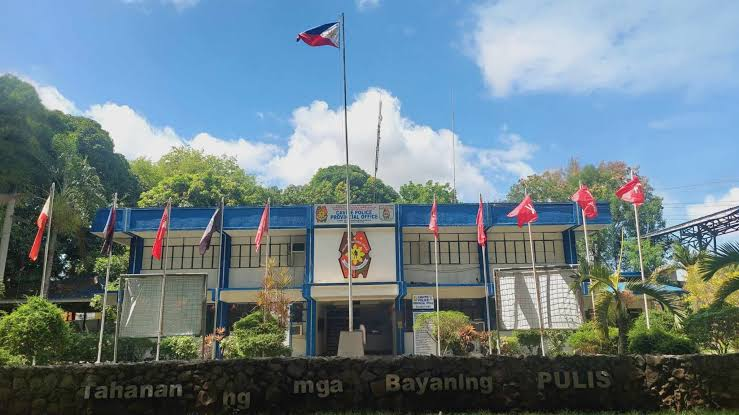
- Cavite PPO Headquarters

Police agency overview
- Formed: January 29, 1991
- Type: Provincial law enforcement agency
- Jurisdiction: Province of Cavite
- Headquarters: Camp BGEN. Pantaleon Garcia, Imus City, Cavite
- Motto: Cavite: Tahanan ng mga Bayaning Pulis (English: Cavite: Home of the Heroic Police)
- Police agency executives: PCOL. Ariel R. Red, Provincial Director; PLTCOL. Willy Salazar, Deputy Provincial Director for Administration; PLTCOL. Jonathan A. Asnan, Deputy Director for Operations; PMAJ. Sandie Caparroso, Director of Provincial Intelligence Unit; PLTCOL. Jaymar B. Marabella, Provincial Investigation Division Management Unit; PLTCOL. Charles Daven Capagcuan, Director of Provincial Operations Management Unit
- Parent Police agency: Police Regional Office 4A
- Website: https://caviteppo.pro4a.pnp.gov.ph

The Cavite Police Provincial Office (Cavite PPO) is the primary law enforcement unit of the Philippine National Police overseeing the province of Cavite. Headquartered at Camp BGen Pantaleon Garcia in Imus City, it manages multiple city and municipal police stations to maintain peace, order, and security across the region. The Cavite PPO is led by Police Colonel Ariel Red, Provincial Director, and is under the Department of the Interior and Local Government (DILG). This was officially created under January 29, 1991, by Republic Act no. 6975 (Department of the Interior and Local Government Act of 1990), which reorganized DILG and turned the Philippine Constabulary and Integrated National Police into the Philippine National Police. It is also awarded as the "Best Police Provincial Office" and has maintained high performance ratings region-wide.

== List of police stations in Cavite ==
The following are the local police stations in Cavite:

- Alfonso Municipal Police Station
- Amadeo Municipal Police Station
- Bacoor City Police Station
- Carmona City Police Station
- Cavite City Police Station
- Dasmariñas City Police Station
- General Emilio Aguinaldo (Bailen) Municipal Police Station
- General Mariano Alvarez Municipal Police Station
- General Trias City Police Station
- Imus City Police Station (Central police station)
- Indang Municipal Police Station
- Kawit Municipal Police Station
- Magallanes Municipal Police Station
- Maragondon Municipal Police Station
- Mendez Municipal Police Station
- Naic Municipal Police Station
- Noveleta Municipal Police Station
- Rosario Municipal Police Station
- Silang Municipal Police Station
- Tagaytay City Police Station
- Tanza Municipal Police Station
- Ternate Municipal Police Station
- Trece Martires City Police Station
