= Homer Saquilayan =

Filipino politician

The Honorable Homer T. Saquilayan
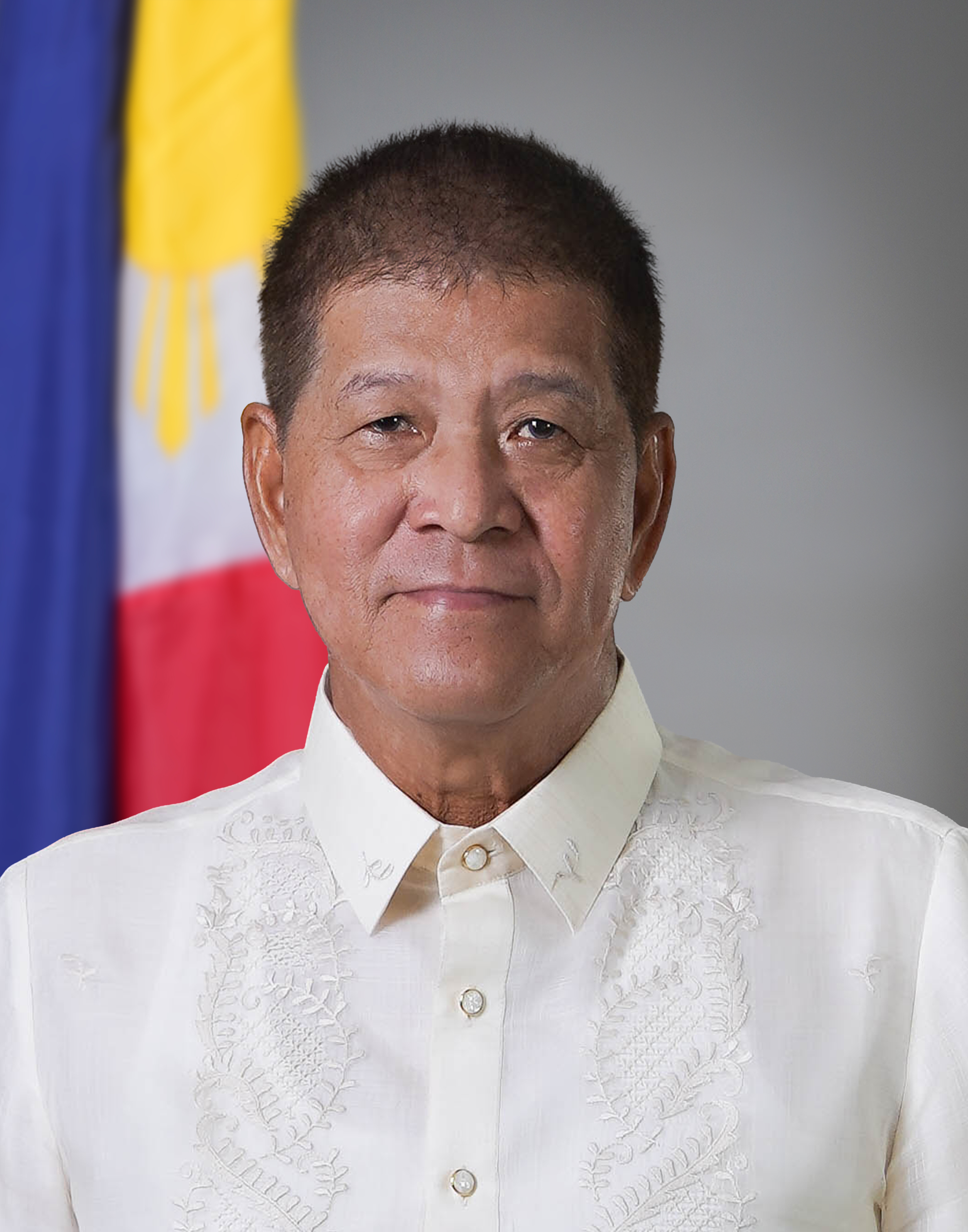
- Official portrait, 2022

Vice Mayor of Imus, Cavite
- Incumbent
- Assumed office June 30, 2022
- Mayor: Alex Advincula
- Preceded by: Arnel Cantimbuhan
- In office June 30, 1998 – June 30, 2001
- Mayor: Oscar Jaro
- Preceded by: Teodoro Sanchez
- Succeeded by: Emmanuel Maliksi

Member of the Cavite Provincial Board from the 3rd district
- In office June 30, 2016 – June 30, 2019

Mayor of Imus, Cavite
- In office March 18, 2013 – April 11, 2013
- Preceded by: Emmanuel Maliksi
- Succeeded by: Emmanuel Maliksi
- In office June 30, 2010 – December 28, 2011
- Preceded by: Emmanuel Maliksi
- Succeeded by: Emmanuel Maliksi
- In office March 28, 2007 – April 25, 2007
- Preceded by: Oscar Jaro
- Succeeded by: Oscar Jaro
- In office June 30, 2004 – March 21, 2007
- Preceded by: Oscar Jaro
- Succeeded by: Oscar Jaro
- In office June 30, 2001 – March 30, 2004
- Preceded by: Oscar Jaro
- Succeeded by: Oscar Jaro

Personal details
- Born: July 13, 1955 (age 71) Imus, Cavite, Philippines
- Party: NUP (2021–present); Magdalo (local party; 1998–present)
- Other political affiliations: PMP (2018–2021); Nacionalista (2007–2018); LDP (1998–2007)
- Spouse: Adelaida Saquilayan
- Relations: Ferdinand Topacio (cousin)
- Occupation: Public Servant
- Profession: Civil Engineer

Homer "Tatay Saki" Topacio Saquilayan (born July 13, 1955) is a Filipino politician who served as the vice mayor of Imus, Cavite, since 2022, having previously served in the position from 1998 to 2001.

== Political career ==
Saquilayan was elected as vice mayor in 1998 and served until 2001, when he decided to challenge incumbent Mayor Oscar Jaro in his reelection bid. He defeated Jaro by only 748 votes. Jaro proceeded to contest the election results in all of the precincts and in January 2004, the Imus Regional Trial Court declared him the winner by 5,257 votes.

In the elections that year, he and Jaro challenged each other again and defeated the latter by about 1,000 votes. Jaro filed an electoral protest again and was declared by the Imus Regional Trial Court the winner by 584 votes in 2007. He and Jaro would run against each other for the third time that year but Jaro withdrew from the race and endorsed Vice Mayor Emmanuel Maliksi instead. He was defeated by Maliksi in that race.

In 2010, he was elected again as mayor, winning over Maliksi by a margin of 8,499 votes. Maliksi filed an electoral protest and was declared by the Imus Regional Trial Court the winner by 665 votes in 2011. However, on March 12, 2013, he was declared by the Supreme Court as the true winner and he took his oath six days later, on March 18. However, on April 11, 2013, it reversed its ruling and remanded the case back to the COMELEC.

In 2016 elections, Saquilayan decided to run as 3rd District Provincial Board Member under the United Nationalist Alliance. His brother, City Councilor Edgardo Saquilayan run under ONE IMUS, a coalition between Imus City's Liberal Party and UNA, with his rival, Mayor Maliksi and other LP candidates.

In 2019, he ran as Mayor against incumbent Mayor Maliksi, but lost.

In 2022 elections, he run for a vice mayoral post with his long-term political partner incumbent Rep. Alex 'AA' Advincula of the lone district of Imus City as his running mate.
