= Imus Cathedral =

Roman Catholic church in Cavite, Philippines

- Diocesan Shrine and Parish of Our Lady of the Pillar
- Our Lady of the Pillar Parish Cathedral
- Parroquia de la Nuestra Señora del Pilar (Spanish)
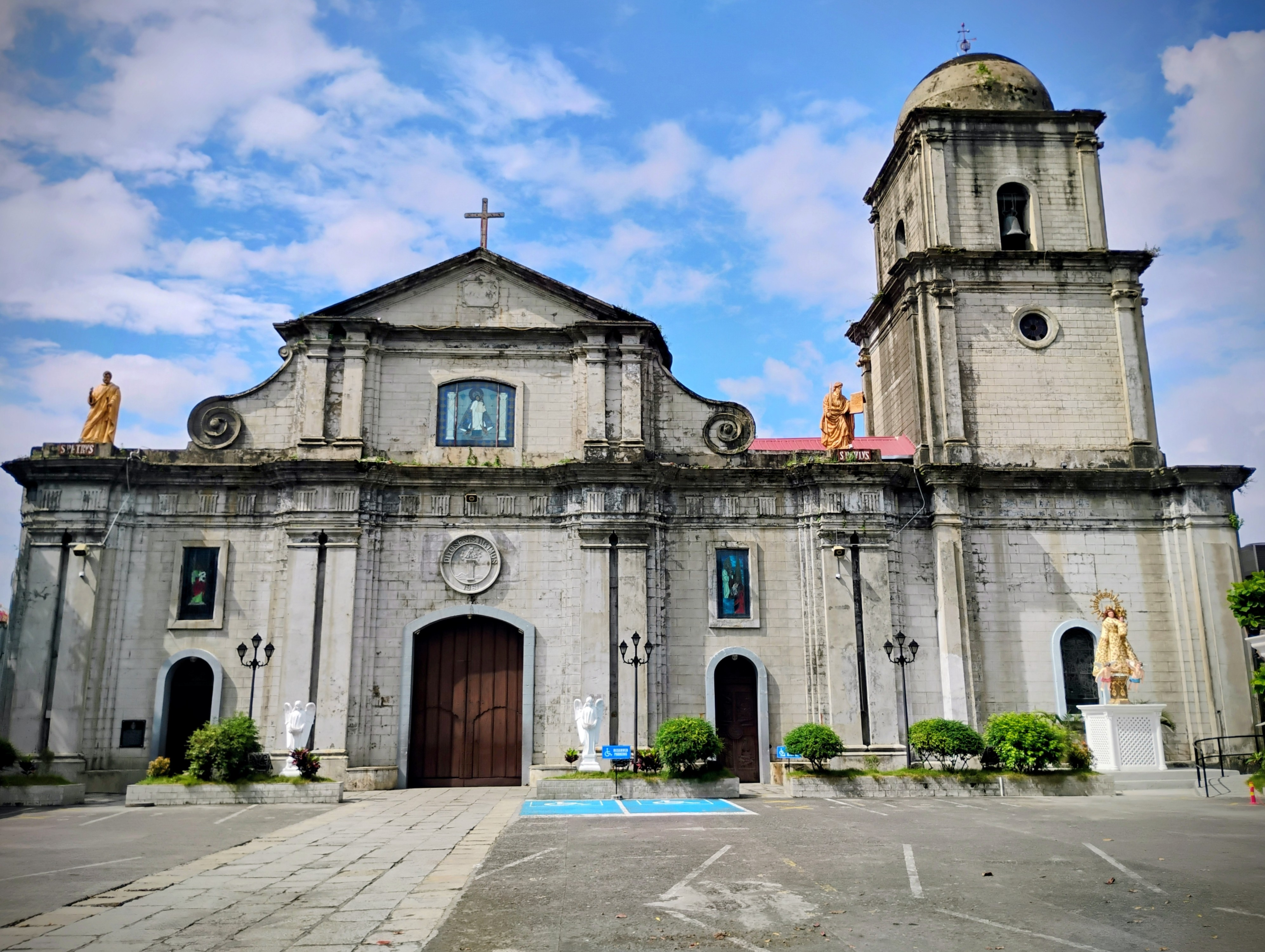
- Cathedral facade in 2025

- Location in Luzon Location in the Philippines
- 14°25′47″N 120°56′10″E
- Location: Imus, Cavite
- Country: Philippines
- Denomination: Roman Catholic
- Tradition: Roman Rite
- Website: imusdiocese.net

History
- Former name(s): Imus Parish Church, Imus Catholic Church, Our Lady of the Pillar Cathedral Parish
- Status: Cathedral Parish Diocesan Shrine
- Founded: 1795
- Dedication: Our Lady of the Pillar and Saint John the Baptist
- Other dedication: November 25, 1961

Architecture
- Functional status: Active
- Heritage designation: Marked Structure (of Historical Significance) by the National Historical Commission of the Philippines
- Designated: November 13, 2006
- Architect: Nicolas Becerra
- Architectural type: Church building
- Style: Baroque architecture
- Groundbreaking: 1823
- Completed: 1853

Specifications
- Length: 200 ft (61 m)
- Width: 130 ft (40 m)
- Height: 100 ft (30 m) est.
- Materials: Bricks and tuff stone

Administration
- Division: Episcopal District of St. Matthew
- Province: Manila
- Archdiocese: Manila
- Diocese: Imus
- Parish: Parish of Our Lady of the Pillar

Clergy
- Archbishop: Cardinal Jose Advincula
- Bishop: Reynaldo G. Evangelista
- Rector: Rev Fr. Reuel D. Castañeda; Lingkod Ni Yahweh Community Music Ministry; Tinig ng Katedral; Saint Thérèse Choir; Cathedral Choir of Our Lady of the Pillar; Imusicapella; Himig Batingaw; Voices of The Pillar

The Diocesan Shrine and Parish of Our Lady of the Pillar, commonly known as Imus Cathedral, is a Roman Catholic cathedral in the city of Imus, in the province of Cavite, Philippines. The church serves as the seat of the bishop of the Diocese of Imus, the diocese that has jurisdiction over the entire Civil Province of Cavite.

Enshrined inside the cathedral is the canonically crowned image of Nuestra Senora del Pilar de Imus (Our Lady of the Pillar). The said title of the Blessed Virgin Mary serves as the titular patroness of the Diocese of Imus, Province of Cavite, as implied by then pope, now a saint, John XXIII. John the Baptist is also considered the secondary patron saint of the city. The current parish priest and rector of the cathedral is Reuel Castañeda, vicar general of the diocese.

The church itself features the longest Holy Week procession in the province of Cavite, with at least 70 floats and the country's 5th longest overall (the other four being the St Augustine Parish, Baliuag, and San Isidro Labrador, Pulilan, both located in the province of Bulacan, with at least 110 floats per parish, The Our Lady Of the Abandoned in Marikina, with 82 floats, and The Our Lady of Aranzazu San Mateo, Rizal with 76 floats). Currently, the cathedral is being elevated into Cathedral Shrine.

== History ==
=== Establishment ===
In 1616, the Augustinian Recollects arrived in Imus and established a convent. The parish of Imus started as a chapel-of-ease in Brgy. Toclong, a sub-parish (visita) of Cavite Viejo (now Kawit, Cavite). Recollect Father Pedro de San Buenaventura petitioned the government to convert Imus into an independent municipality in 1774. Imus, though, did not become a separate town and parish until October 3, 1795. Its poblacion (town center) and a provisional church was first established in an area currently known as Brgy. Bayan Luma (Tagalog for 'Old Town'). The parish was under the order of the Augustinian Recollects with Francisco de Santiago, O.A.R., its first assigned priest.

=== Construction of the present church ===
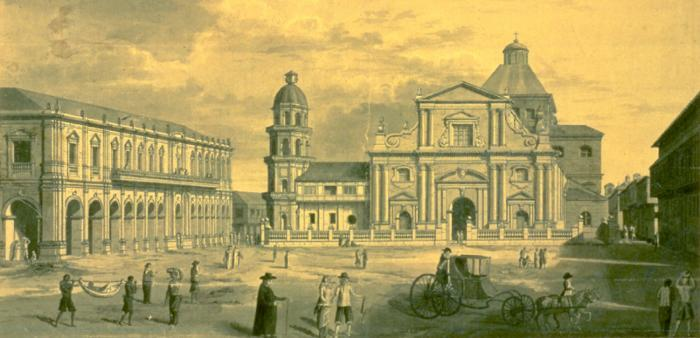
The façade of Imus Cathedral was probably designed after the fifth incarnation of the Manila Cathedral (above) by Uguccioni

During the leadership of Fr. Nicolas Becerra, who served from 1821 to 1840, he advocated the move of the town center to Brgy. Balangon, its present location. The construction of the parish church of Imus on the new location was started in 1823 using forced labor. The structure was made from stone and bricks. Its facade was patterned after the fifth Manila Cathedral by Fr. Juan de Uguccioni, which existed from 1760 to 1852.

=== Hacienda de San Juan de Imus ===
The early fathers were preoccupied with not just religious matters but also of economic concerns. The friars gradually bought parcels of land while some of these lands were donated by rich families. The Recollects were the first ones to buy parcels of land beginning in 1666 and their haciendas came to being in 1812. These areas, comprising the Hacienda de San Juan de Imus or the Hacienda de Imus (Imus Estate), grew to include the whole towns of Imus, Dasmariñas, and Brgy. Binakayan in Kawit. The estate house of the hacienda, or the house of the friars, was located along Imus River (at the present day Cuartel) at the southern end of the Bridge of Isabel II, a Spanish bridge built by the priest-engineers of the Recollects. Citizens of Imus were required to pay rent to live and tilled the lands of Imus.

=== Secularization ===
The Hacienda de Imus was sold by the Recollect Corporation on March 31, 1894, to the Fomento de la Agricultura de Filipinas (Promotion of Agriculture in the Philippines), a corporation in Madrid, for 4,000,000 pesetas. It was later sold to the British Manila Estates Company, which eventually sold it to the U.S. controlled Philippine government for $1,045,000 in U.S. currency for distribution to the Filipinos, to win their favor, and to pacify the revolutionaries. The Church of Imus became secular in 1897.

== Diocese of Imus ==
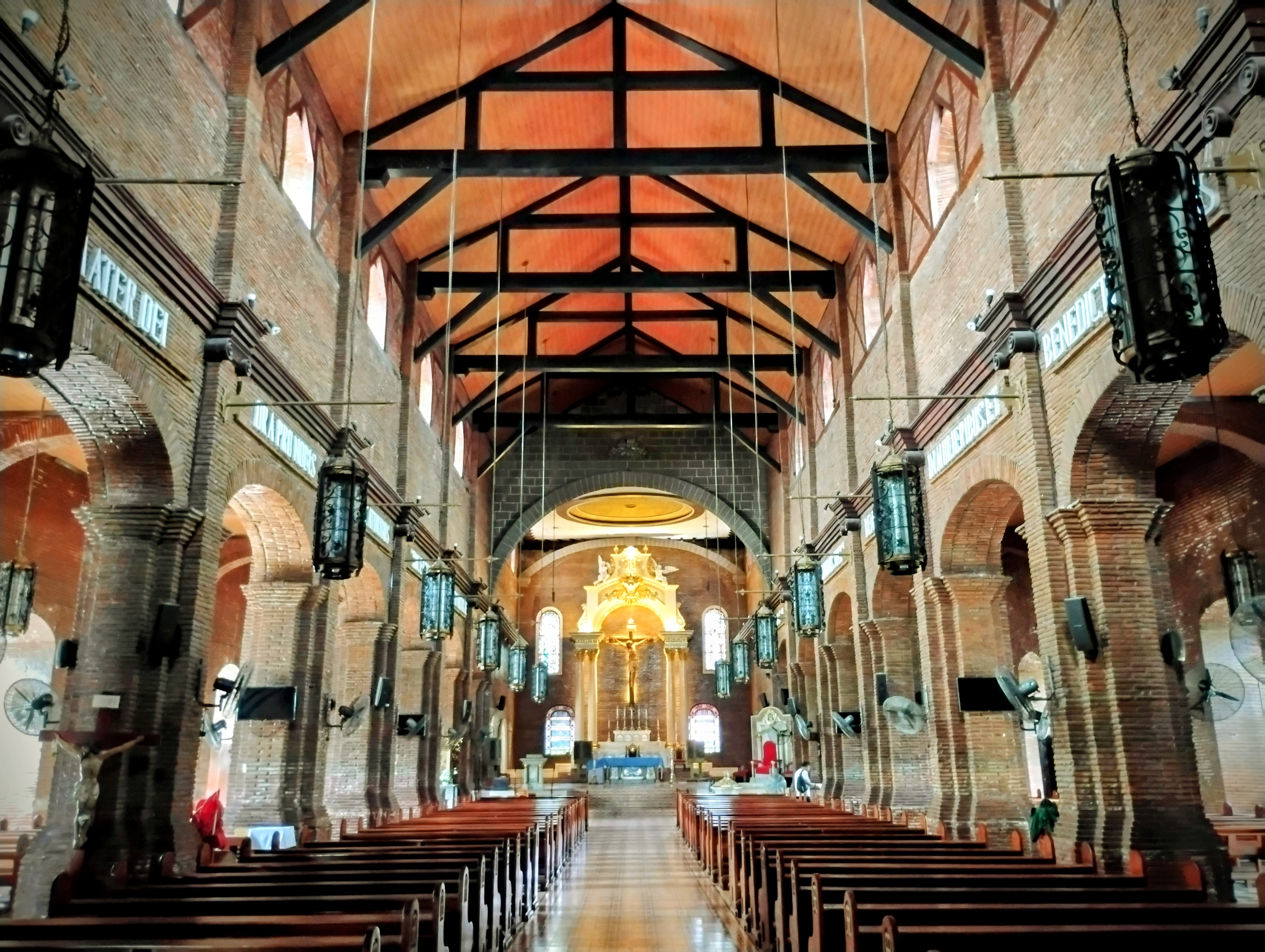
Cathedral interior in 2025

By virtue of the Apostolic Constitution Christi fidelium promulgated by Pope John XXIII on November 25, 1961, Cavite was created a separate bishopric from Manila after more than three hundred years. On April 26, 1962, the Diocese of Imus was formally erected and established. The then parish church of Imus was chosen to become the cathedral of the diocese, the seat of the bishop of Cavite, with the Virgin Mary under her title Our Lady of the Pillar, its titular patroness. The first leader of the diocese and bishop of Cavite is Artemio Casas, originally from Meycauayan, Bulacan.

=== Bishop of Imus ===
The current bishop of Imus is Reynaldo G. Evangelista, previously bishop of the Diocese of Boac and a native of Batangas, who was appointed by Pope Francis on April 8, 2013, his first pontifical appointment in the Philippines. He replaced Bishop Luis Antonio Tagle (whose paternal ancestry is from Imus) after his installation as the Archbishop of Manila in December 12, 2011. Evangelista was installed as the fifth bishop of Imus on June 5, 2013.

== Historical marker ==
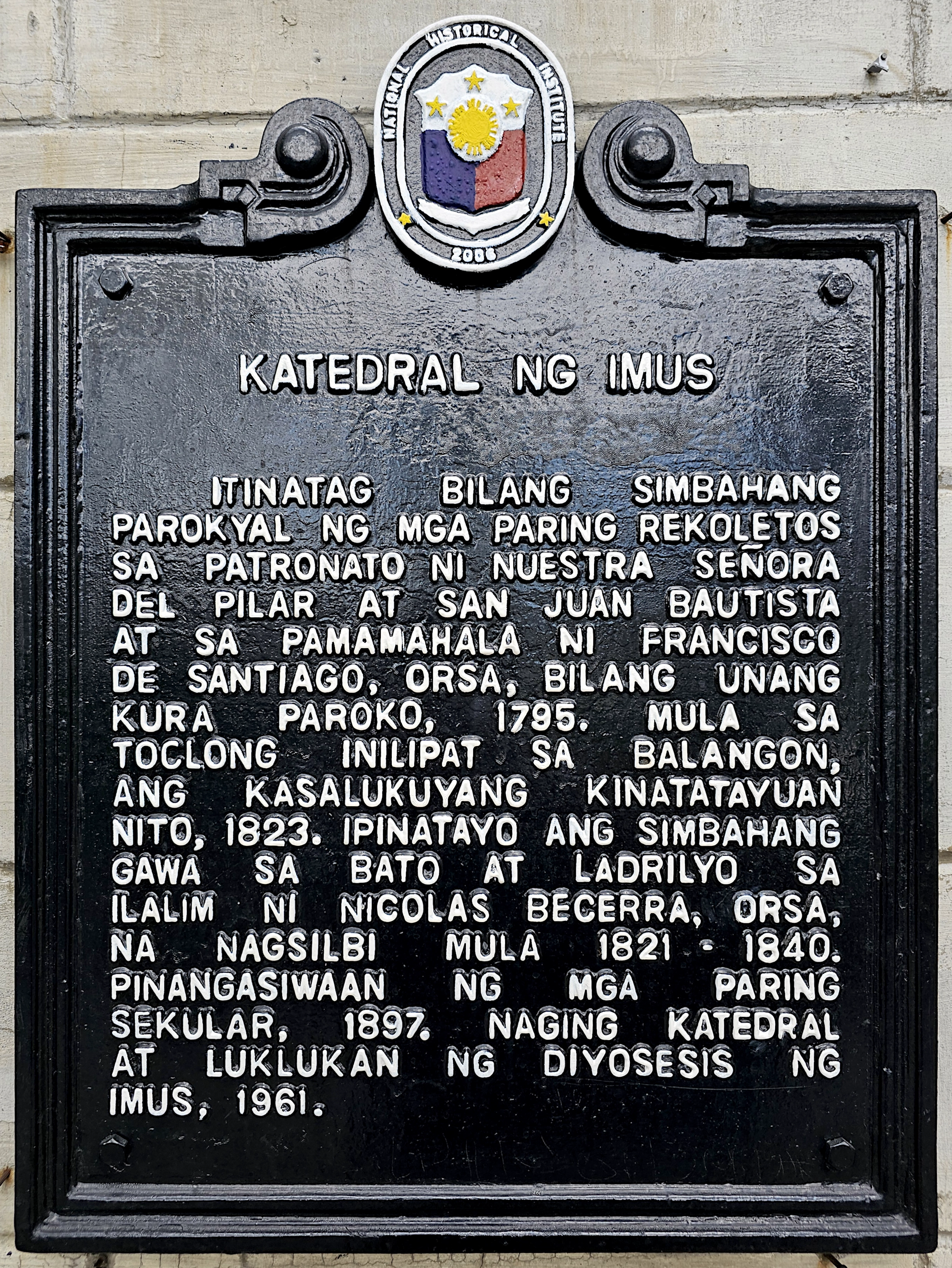
Church NHI historical marker installed in 2006

The cathedral was declared a structure of historical significance with the placing of a historical marker by then National Historical Institute of the Philippines on November 13, 2006.

== Coronation of the patroness of the Diocese of Imus ==
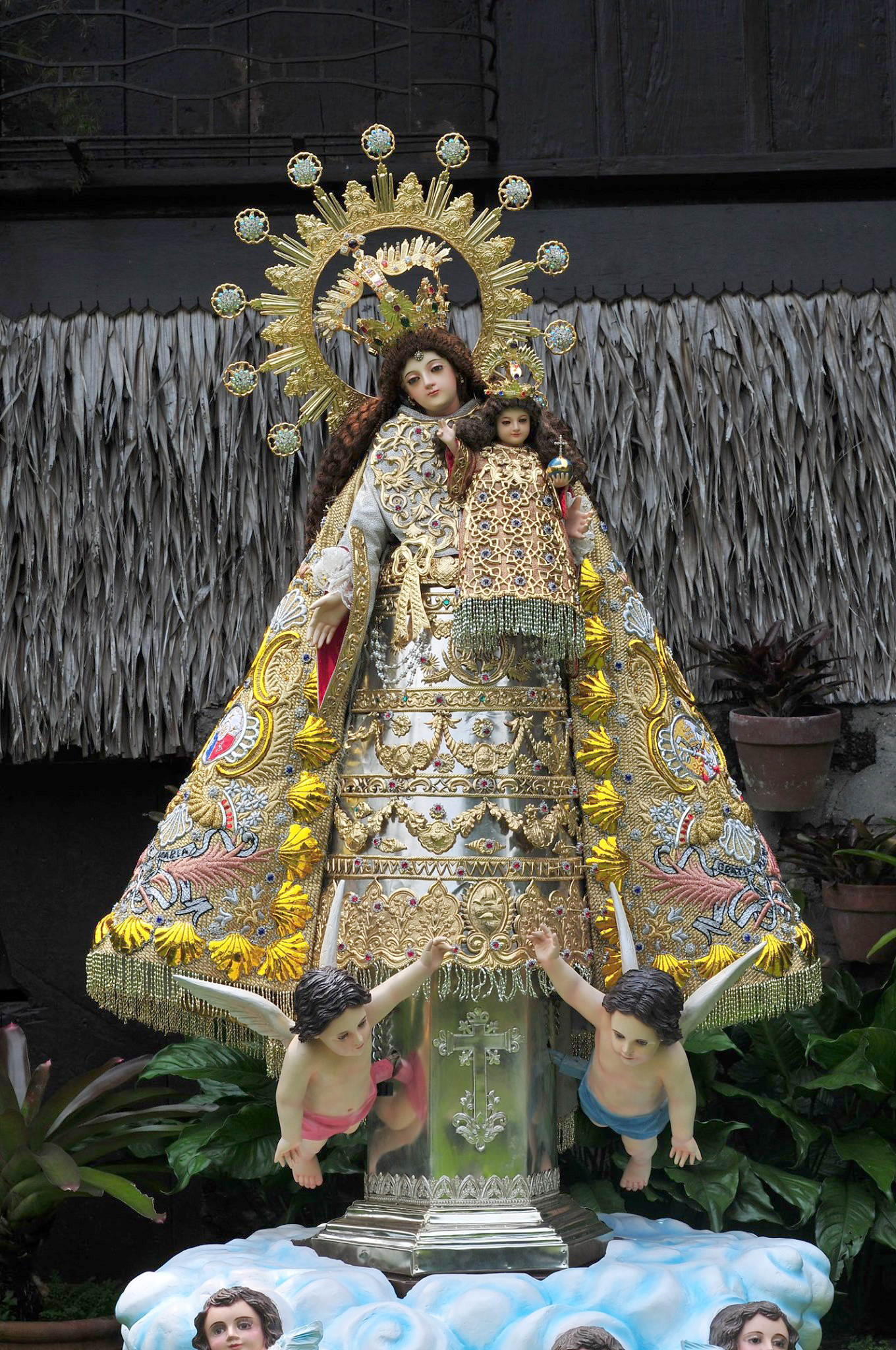
The image of Our Lady of the Pillar of Imus

The image of the patroness of the Imus Cathedral, Our Lady of the Pillar of Imus, was canonically crowned on December 3, 2012, by Cardinal Luis Antonio Tagle. It was originally scheduled for November 26 but the elevation of Tagle into a cardinal by Pope Benedict XVI necessitated the move.

== Vicariate of Our Lady of the Pillar ==
Vicariate of Our Lady of the Pillar (City of Imus) Sede Vacante

=== Parishes ===
- Immaculate Heart of Mary Parish – Bucandala (Parish Priest: Rev Fr. Honorato N. Naty)
- Mary, Mother of God Parish – Malagasang II (Parish Priest: Rev Fr. Melencio Sandoval)
- Our Lady of Fatima Parish – Anabu I (Parish Priest: Rev Fr. James Andes)
- Our Lady of Fatima Parish – Anabu II (1st Parish Administrator: Rev. Fr. Ross Erwin Layugan, OFS)
- Resident Priest: Rev. Fr. Teodoro Villañueva
- Guest Priest: Rev. Fr. Benchley Pusing, MSP
- Diocesan Shrine and Parish of Our Lady of the Pillar - Imus Cathedral – Poblacion (City Proper) Rector & Parish Priest: Rev. Fr. Reuel Castañeda,
- Guest Priest: Rev. Fr. Jeson Ly Berdida, MSFS
- St. James the Greater Parish – Buhay na Tubig (Parish Priest: Rev. Fr. Antonio Laureta)
- St. Martha Parish – Greengate, Malagasang II (Parish Priest: Rev Fr. Benjamin Francisco)
- Holy Family Parish – Lancaster Estates ( Rev Fr. Alain Manalo)
- Parokya ni San Roque - Pag-Asa II (Parish priest: Rev. Fr. Stephen Maragañas, TC)

== Our Lady of the Pillar Parish ==
=== Chapels ===
- Mary, Mother of the Good Shepherd Chapel (Palico)
- Our Lady of the Pillar Chapel (Bayan Luma)
- St. Peregrine Chapel (Toclong)
- San Juan Bautista Chapel (Tanzang Luma)
- Our Lady of Fatima Chapel (Villa Leticia)
- Our Lady of the Miraculous Medal (Southern City Subdivision)

== Activities ==
=== Ministries ===
- Parish Youth Ministry
- Ministry of Altar Servers
- Extraordinary Ministers of Holy Communion
- Lay Ministers of the Word
- Our Lady of the Pillar Parish Music Ministry
  - includes: Lingkod Ni Yahweh Community Music Ministry (est. 1979), Tinig ng Katedral (est. 1980), Himig Batingaw (est. 1978), etc.
- Ministry of Cantors

=== Radio station ===
89.5 FM frequency is used by the Parish to broadcast Parish activities such as the recitation of the Rosary for the traditional Good Friday procession. Daily Mass, Vigil and Sunday Masses, as well as Masses for holy days of obligation celebrated in the Cathedral are also transmitted live through the same frequency, broadcasting on a very low power output.
