= Diocese of Imus =

Latin Catholic diocese in the Philippines

Coordinates: 14.4295°N 120.9361°E

Diocese of Imus Dioecesis Imusensis Diyosesis ng Imus Diócesis de Imus

Catholic
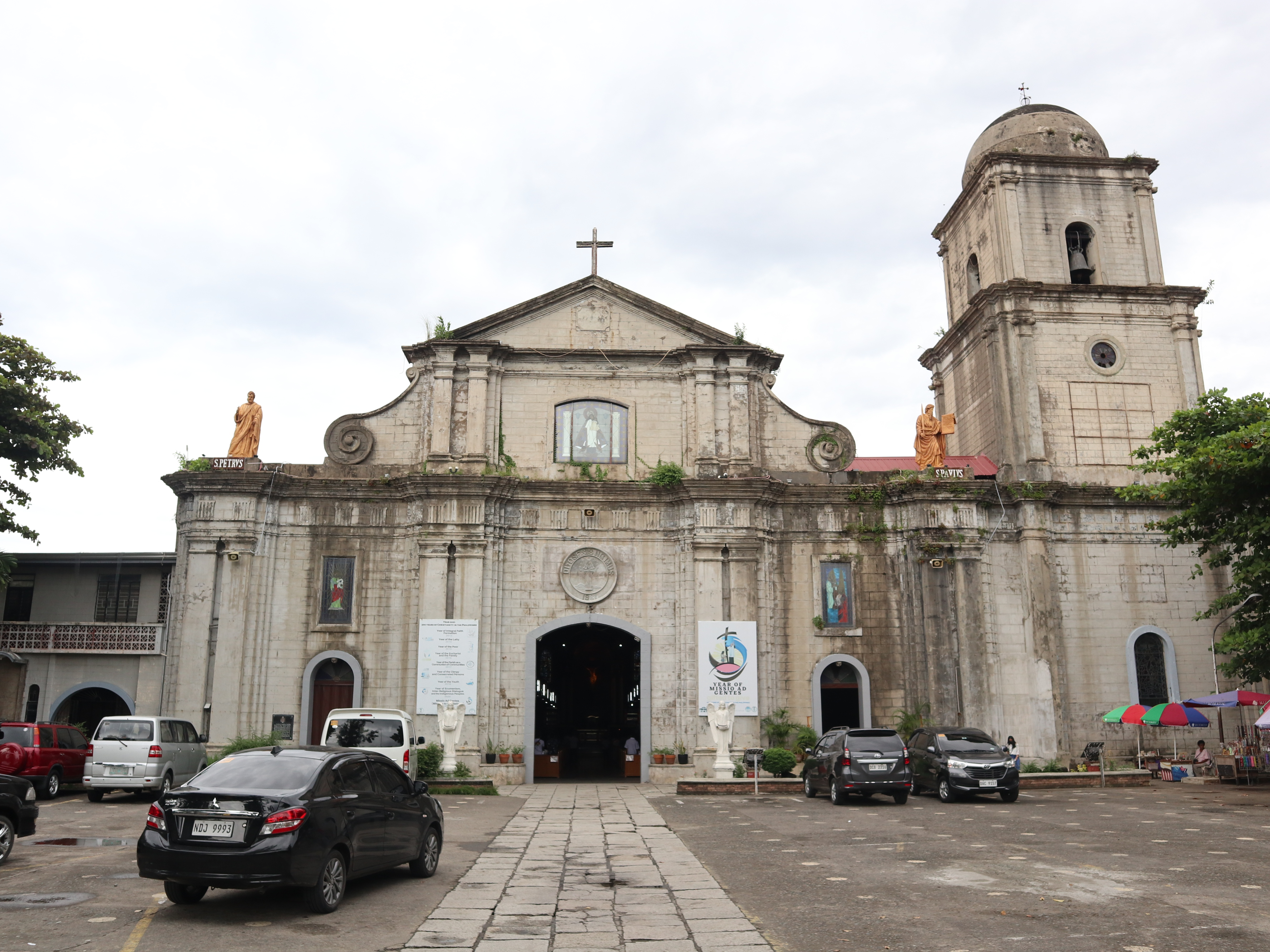
- Imus Cathedral

- Coat of arms

Location
- Country: Philippines
- Territory: Cavite
- Ecclesiastical province: Manila
- Metropolitan: Manila

Statistics
- Area: 1,427.06 km^{2} (550.99 sq mi)
- Population: Total; Catholics: (as of 2021); 4,054,000; 3,239,000 (79.9%)
- Parishes: 90 (as of 11 Dec 2023)
- Schools: 43

Information
- Denomination: Catholic
- Sui iuris church: Latin Church
- Rite: Roman Rite
- Established: November 25, 1961
- Cathedral: Diocesan Shrine and Parish of Our Lady of the Pillar - Imus Cathedral
- Patron saint: Our Lady of the Pillar
- Secular priests: 190+

Current leadership
- Pope: Leo XIV
- Bishop: Reynaldo G. Evangelista, O.F.S.
- Metropolitan Archbishop: Cardinal José Lázaro F. Advincula, O.P.
- Vicar General: Rev Fr. Reuel Castañeda
- Bishops emeritus: Cardinal Luis Antonio G. Tagle (2001-2011)

Website
- The Roman Catholic Diocese of Imus

The Diocese of Imus (Latin: Dioecesis Imusensis; Tagalog: Diyosesis ng Imus; Spanish and Chavacano: Diócesis de Imus) is a Catholic diocese in the Philippines that comprises the entire province of Cavite. By the virtue of the apostolic constitution Christi Fidelium, promulgated by Pope John XXIII, the diocese was canonically erected on November 25, 1961, when it was excised from the Archdiocese of Manila (the territory of the civil province of Cavite, excluding Tagaytay) and the then-diocese, now Archdiocese of Lipa (the territory of the City of Tagaytay). The diocese was formally inaugurated on April 26, 1962 and its first bishop, Artemio Gabriel Casas, took canonical possession of its administration. Imus Cathedral, located along General Castañeda Street in the poblacion of Imus, serves as the see of the diocese. It is one of twelve cathedrals founded by the Order of Augustinian Recollects in the Philippines.

The diocese is home to around 3,239,000 Roman Catholics spread across four episcopal districts, 13 vicariates, 90 parishes, a national shrine (Our Lady of La Salette), and eight were declared as diocesan shrines. There are 184 priests in the diocese, 95 of which are diocesan and 89 are religious.

In 2011, the Diocese of Imus celebrated the Golden Jubilee of its establishment. Activities were held within the diocese to mark the momentous event. Prior to the occasion, the celebration of the 5th Asian Youth Day in 2009 was also held in the diocese.

The diocese is under the patronage of the Virgin Mary under the title Our Lady of the Pillar, whose feast day is celebrated on October 12. The image of Our Lady was canonically crowned by Cardinal Luis Antonio G. Tagle, then Archbishop of Manila and homegrown Bishop of Imus, in a solemn ceremony held in 2012.

== History ==
Through the zeal of the first missionaries of spreading the Catholic faith, they also helped in founding most of the towns of Cavite province. Among the religious orders that Christianized the Caviteños were the Franciscans, the Recollects, the Dominicans and the Jesuits. They established their first center of faith in Cavite Puerto (now Cavite City). The Catholic faith first came to Imus in 1571, then in Silang in 1581, in Cavite Viejo (now Kawit) in 1587, in Maragondon in 1611, Indang in 1655, Ternate in 1700 and in San Francisco de Malabon (now General Trias) in 1758. As early as 1614, Cavite became a politico-military province.

The province of Cavite is rich with historical significance. It had been the site of many battles and uprisings against Spain, one of which was that of 1872, which resulted in the execution of three priests: Gomez, Burgos and Zamora (Gomburza). Cavite is also where General Emilio Aguinaldo proclaimed the Philippine Independence from Spanish rule on June 12, 1898, in the town of Kawit.

The province is named after its shape, that of a hook – hence Kawit, meaning hook, in Tagalog. It is geographically situated at the very entrance to Manila Bay, a location which has made it, along with Bataan on the north, the scene of many battles in the past. It is bounded on the northwest by the Bay, on the northeast by the provinces of Rizal and Laguna, on the southwest by the province of Batangas. Its capital city is Imus, with the seat of the provincial government located in Trece Martires.

Early in the American regime, a U.S. naval garrison was stationed at Sangley Point in Cavite City after a civil government was established in 1901. Because of mutual defense agreements, this base remained in Cavite long after the country was granted its independence in 1946.

The topography of the province is gentle upward sloping towards the south, peaking in Tagaytay Ridge and Mts. Palay-Palay - Mataas-na-Gulod Range, at the border with Batangas province. Areas near the coast are flat where rice is an important crop. Fishing is another major industry in the coastal towns. The language spoken is Tagalog, which is the basis for Filipino, the national language of the country. More than 60 per cent of the inhabitants live in urbanized areas because of its proximity to Manila. Today, Cavite is witnessing a more radical urbanization as factories, subdivisions, golf courses, resorts and an Export Processing Zone (EPZA) have sprung up in the province. Tagaytay, with its cool climate and a scenic view of Taal Lake and Taal Volcano, draws many tourists each year.

For many centuries Cavite was under the direct control of the Archdiocese of Manila. The Diocese of Imus was created on November 25, 1961 separating Cavite from the main archdiocese. Thus, the diocese serves as suffragan to that of Manila with its own leadership. It comprises the civil province of Cavite and covers a land area of 1,287 km^{2} (497 sq mi), with a population of 1,643,549 of which 76 per cent are Catholics.

On April 8, 2013, Reynaldo Gonda Evangelista was appointed by Pope Francis as the fifth bishop of Imus. He is the first appointee of Pope Francis on the Catholic hierarchy of the Philippines. He was installed last June 5, 2013.

== Ordinaries ==
The list of the assigned bishops of the diocese since its establishment is as follows:

Bishop		Period in office	Notes	Coat of Arms
1	Artemio Gabriel Casas	February 24, 1962 – September 4, 1968 (6 years, 193 days)	Appointed Auxiliary Bishop of Manila and later Archbishop of Jaro	
2	Felix Paz Perez	May 27, 1969 – February 29, 1992 (22 years, 278 days)	Died in office	
3	Manuel Cruz Sobreviñas	April 1, 1993 – December 12, 2001 (8 years, 255 days)	Retired	
4	Luis Antonio Gokim Tagle	December 12, 2001 – December 12, 2011 (10 years, 0 days)	Appointed Archbishop of Manila	
5	Reynaldo Gonda Evangelista, O.F.S.	June 5, 2013 – present (13 years, 164 days)		

== See also ==
- Our Lady of the Pillar of Imus
- Archdiocese of Manila
