= Our Lady of the Pillar of Imus =

Patroness of the Diocese of Imus and Imus, Cavite

Our Lady of the Pillar of Imus Nuestra Señora del Pilar de Imus Mahal na Birhen ng Del Pilar ng Imus
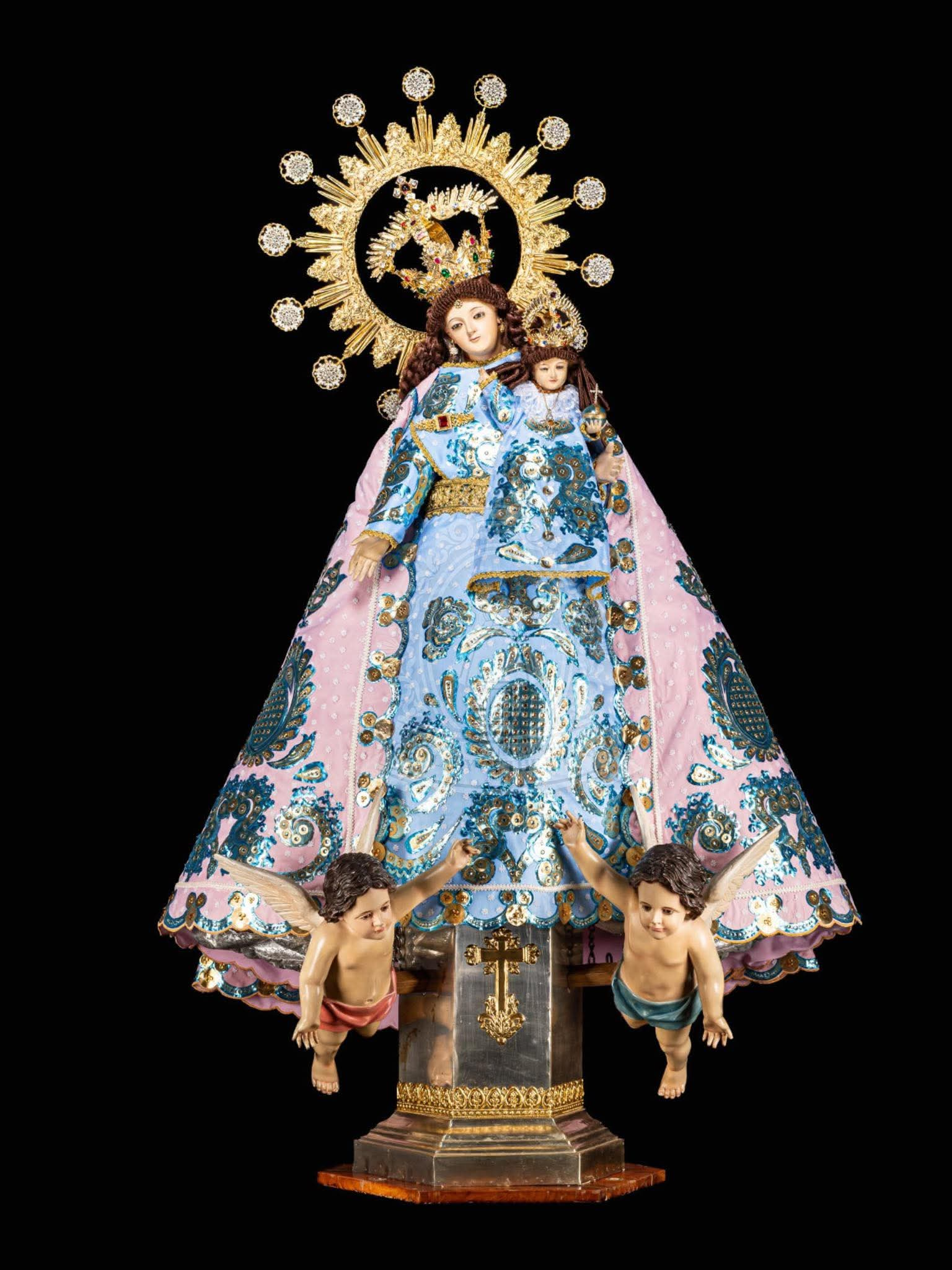
- The canonically crowned image
- Location: Imus, Cavite, Philippines
- Date: 1623 (according to the Archives of the Augustinian Recollect the image was bought by Fray Martin Lumbreras de Peralta from Zaragoza, Spain to Intramuros, Manila until it was transferred to Hacienda de Imus.
- Approval: 3 December 2012, Canonical coronation by Pope Benedict XVI
- Venerated in: Catholic Church; Philippine Independent Church
- Shrine: Diocesan Shrine and Cathedral of Our Lady of the Pillar, Imus, Cavite, Philippines
- Patronage: Imus, Cavite; Diocese of Imus
- Attributes: Madonna and Child atop of a Pillar

Our Lady of the Pillar of Imus (Spanish: Nuestra Señora del Pilar de Imus, Filipino: Mahal na Birhen ng Del Pilar ng Imus) is a Roman Catholic Marian title of Mary, mother of Jesus and infant Jesus atop of a pillar. The city of Imus in the Province of Cavite and the Diocese of Imus consider her as its patroness.

The image was granted a canonical coronation/pontifical coronation by Pope Benedict XVI via a pontifical decree in 2011. The coronation was executed on 3 December 2012 in celebration of the golden jubilee of the Diocese of Imus as decreed by Pope John XXIII via his papal bull "Chisti Fidelis". The feast day is October 12.

Our Lady of the Pillar is a name given to the Virgin Mary following a Marian apparition to Apostle James the Greater in 40 A.D. in what is now Spain. She is the patron saint of Spain.

== History ==
Imus was once part of the Hacienda de Imus owned by the Franciscan Recollect friars in 1686. These also included the Encomienda de Binakayan (Binakayan, Kawit) and Pérez Dasmariñas (Dasmariñas), a former barrio of Imus.

Like Cavite City (originally Cavite La Punta) and Noveleta, Cavite (La Tierra Alta), the Hacienda de Imus was a barrio of Cavite el Viejo (now Kawit, Cavite), whose parish church was built by the Jesuits under Miguel García Serrano, O.S.A., Archbishop of Manila, from 1618 to 1629. For over 150 years, the people of Imus had to endure walking or traveling 4.5 kilometers of dirt road to attend religious services and conduct official business in Cavite el Viejo. The difficulty of communication between Imus and Kawit was long-standing problem until the Order of Augustinian Recollects, as a consequence of the British occupation of Manila in 1762, established a parish church in Imus, in what now Bayanluma.

However, the church was far from the estate house acquired by the Recollects, and when the church was destroyed by a strong typhoon in September 1779, the friars transferred it to Barrio Toclong and then finally to Sitio de Balangon, the present site of the church.

In 1769, tenants of the hacienda together with the cabezas de barangay completed the relocation of their houses into a reducción. This forced resettlement was common in the Spanish Empire, with people placed “bajo de las campanas” (“under the bells”, i.e., within hearing distance of church bells) to facilitate both evangelisation and the enforcement of Spanish authority. Those who resisted living within reducción settlements were locally called “taong labás” (“people outside”), a term which often held connotations of lawlessness.

With the establishment of the Recollect church, the people of Imus gained religious emancipation from the Jesuit-run parish of Cavite el Viejo. The Recollects, however, would not be content: in 1774, Recollect friar Pedro San Buenaventura, petitioned the government to "separate the inquilinos of Imus from the political jurisdiction of the government of Cavite el Viejo." After a considerable wait, the petition was granted, and Imus became an independent municipality on 3 October 1795, exactly nine days before the Feast of Our Lady of the Pillar.

== Canonical coronation ==
Pope Benedict XVI in 2011 acknowledged the petition and miraculous claims of devotees, authorizing the coronation of the image via a papal bull. The canonical coronation was carried out on 3 December 2012 in Imus Cathedral by Cardinal Luis Antonio Tagle, coinciding with celebrations of the diocese’s golden jubilee.
