= Imus =

Capital city of Cavite, Philippines

- Component city
- City of Imus
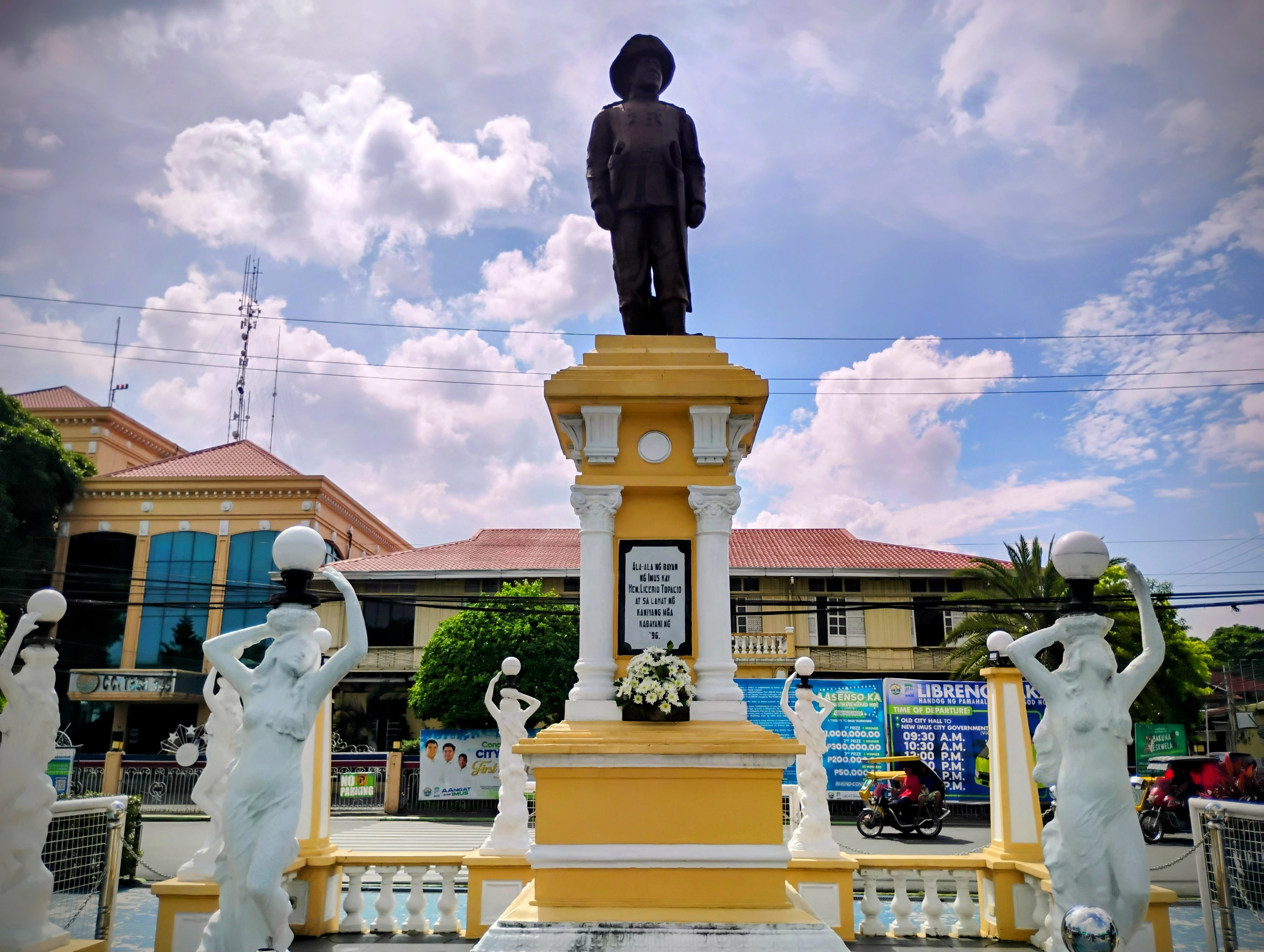
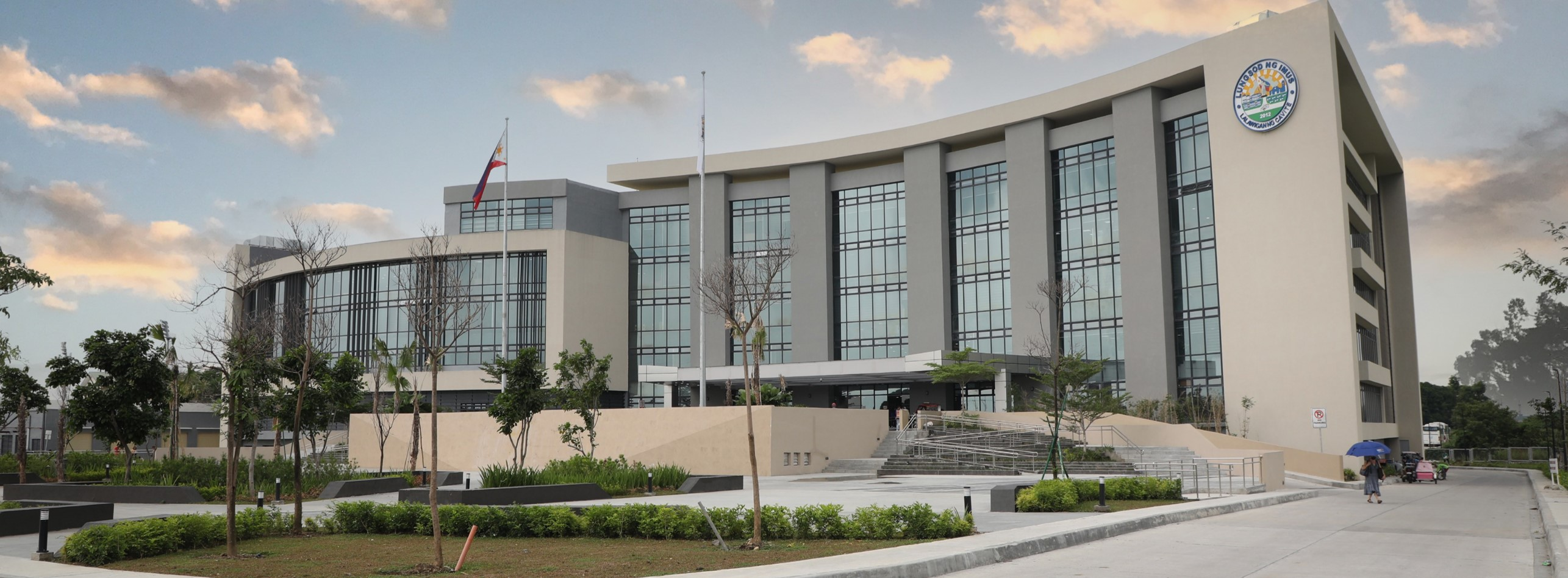
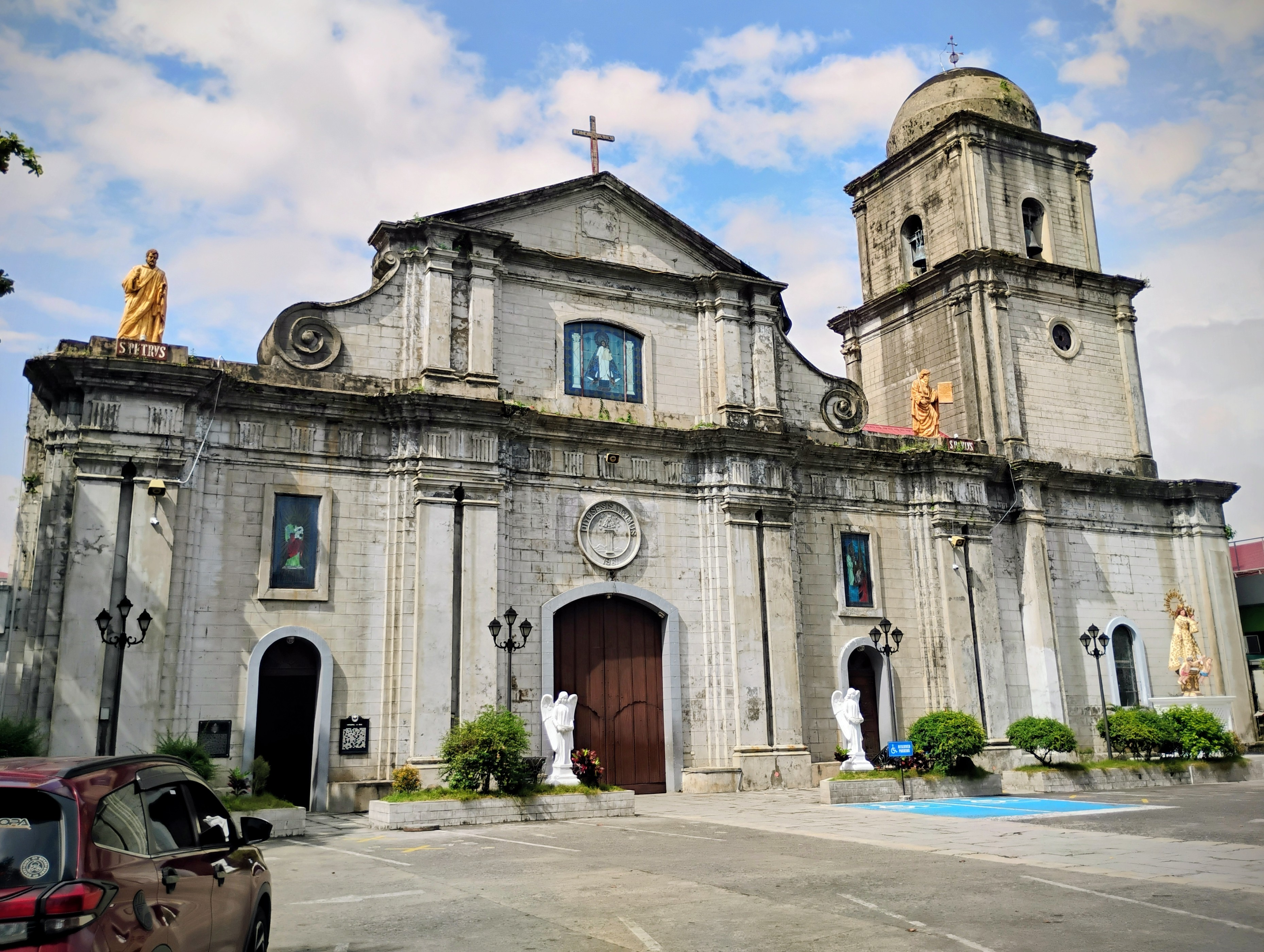
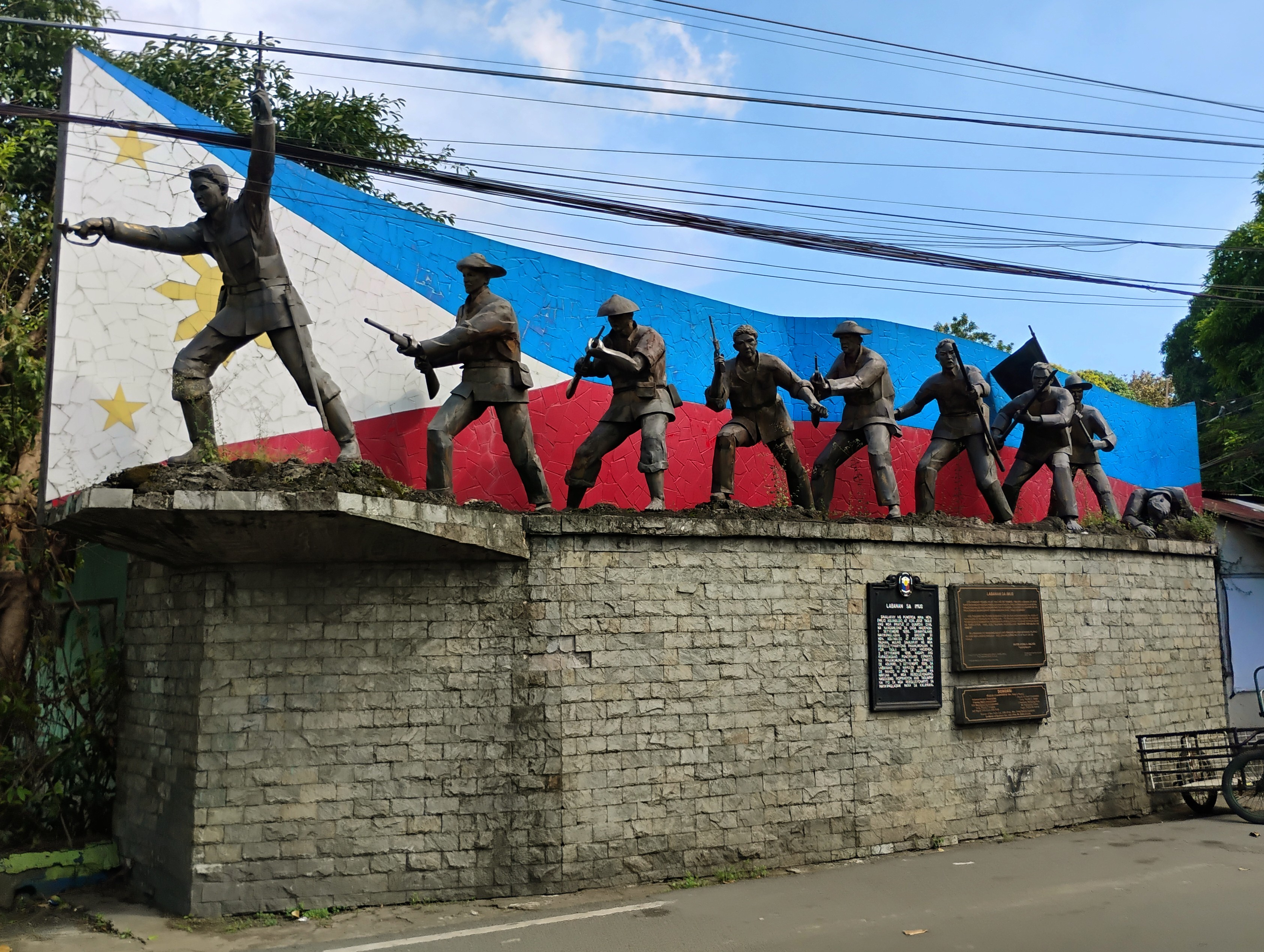
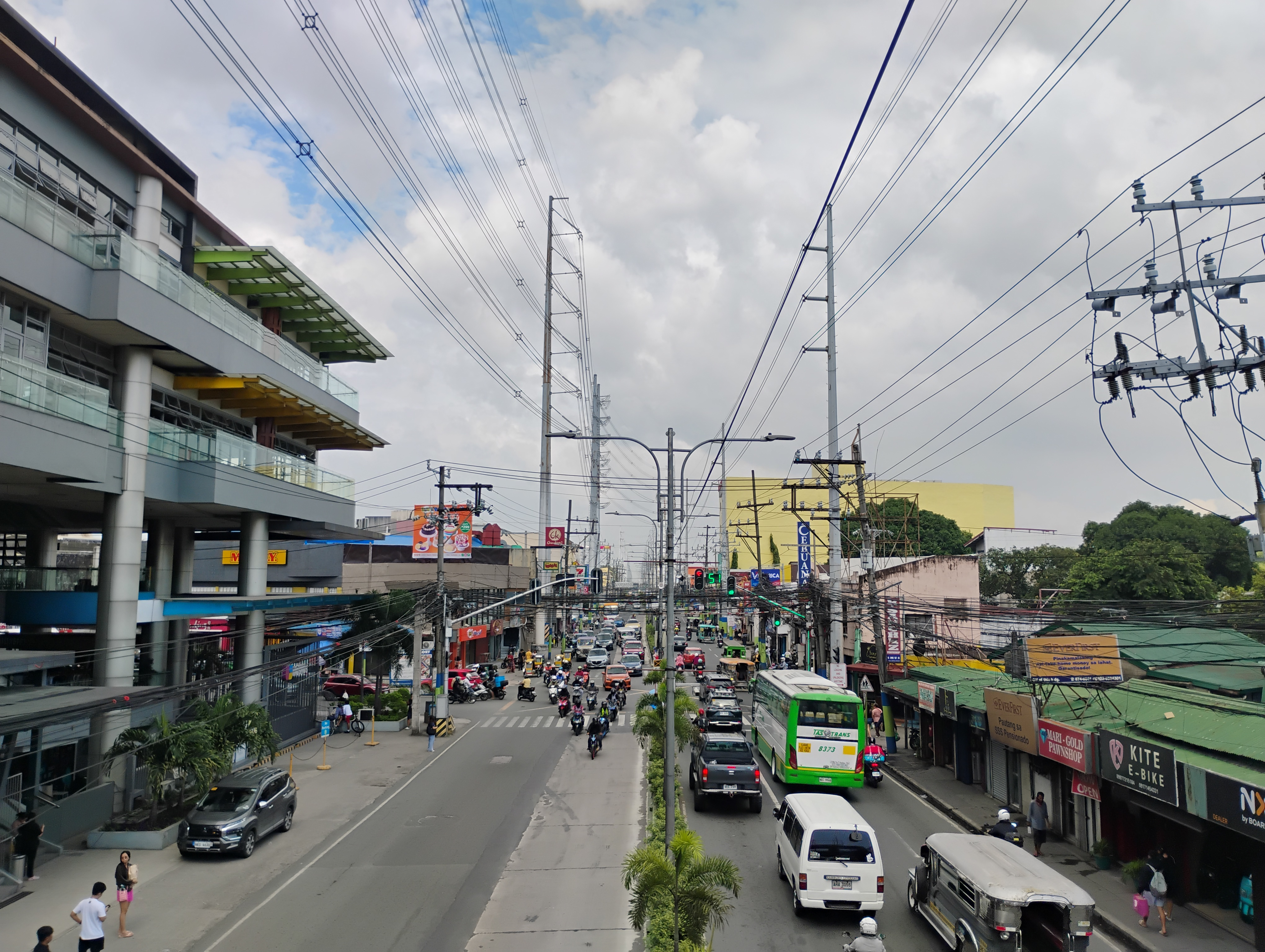
- General Licerio Topacio Monument New Imus City Hall Imus Cathedral Battle of Imus Monument Aguinaldo Highway

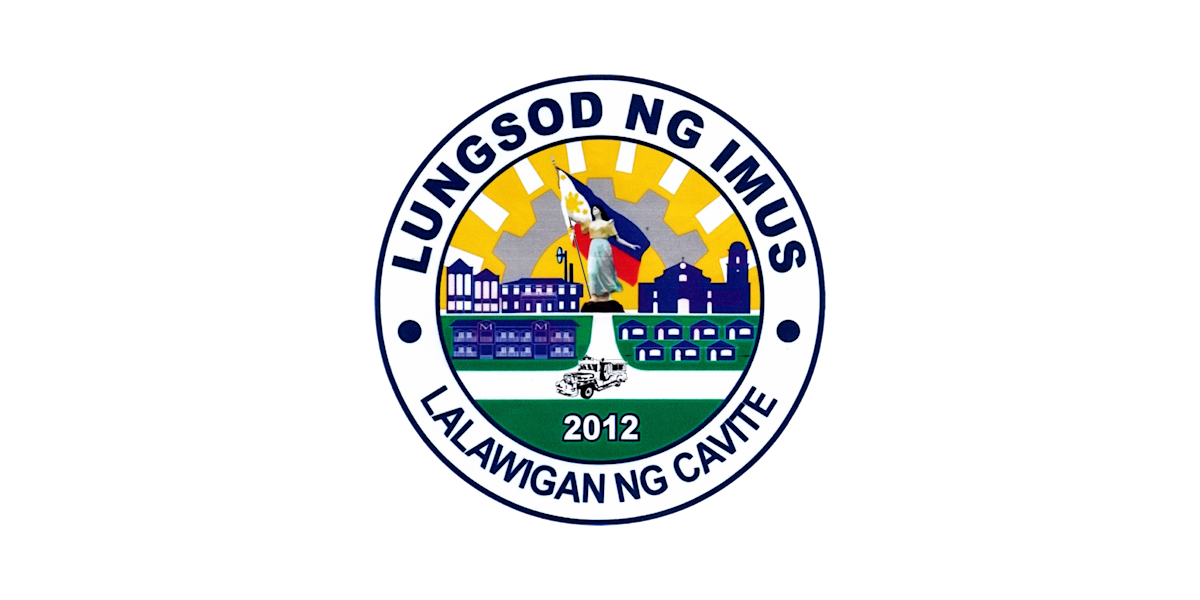
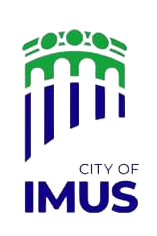
- Flag Seal Logo
- Nickname: Flag Capital of the Philippines
- Map of Cavite with Imus highlighted
- Interactive map of Imus
- Location within the Philippines
- Coordinates: 14°25′47″N 120°56′12″E
- Country: Philippines
- Region: Calabarzon
- Province: Cavite
- District: 3rd district
- Founded: 1795
- Cityhood: June 30, 2012
- Barangays: 97 (see Barangays)

Government
  - Type: Sangguniang Panlungsod
  - Mayor: Alex L. Advincula
  - Vice Mayor: Homer Saquilayan
  - Representative: Adrian Jay C. Advincula
  - City Council: Members: Lloyd Emman D. Jaro; Lloren Dionela G. Saquilayan; Larry Boy S. Nato; Jogie Lyn L. Maliksi; Dennis T. Lacson; Mark Anthony P. Villanueva; Exequiel B. Ropeta; Sherwin L. Comia; Peter Emmanuel C. Lara; Enzo Gaston A. Ferrer; Darwin Marti M. Remulla; Gregorio Miguel B. Ocampo Jr.
  - Electorate: 238,853 voters (2025)

Area
  - Total: 53.15 km^{2} (20.52 sq mi)
- Elevation: 34 m (112 ft)
- Highest elevation: 292 m (958 ft)
- Lowest elevation: 0 m (0 ft)

Population (2024 census)
  - Total: 481,949
  - Density: 9,068/km^{2} (23,490/sq mi)
  - Households: 130,814
- Demonym: Imuseño

Economy
  - Income class: 1st city income class
  - Poverty incidence: 4.62% (2023)
  - Revenue: ₱ 3,212 million (2024)
  - Assets: ₱ 7,823 million (2024)
  - Expenditure: ₱ 1,676 million (2024)
  - Liabilities: ₱ 3,660 million (2024)

Service provider
  - Electricity: Manila Electric Company (Meralco)
  - Water: Maynilad Cavite, BP Waterworks
- Time zone: UTC+8 (PST)
- ZIP code: 4103
- PSGC: 0402109000
- IDD : area code: +63 (0)46
- Native languages: Tagalog
- Catholic diocese: Roman Catholic Diocese of Imus
- Patron saint: Our Lady of the Pillar of Imus
- Website: cityofimus.gov.ph

Imus, (Note: Tagalog pronunciation: [ˈʔimus]) officially the City of Imus, (Note: Filipino: Lungsod ng Imus) is a component city and capital (Note: Imus is the official (de jure) capital, while the seat of government is located in Trece Martires.) of the province of Cavite, Philippines. It is located 20 kilometers (12 mi) south of Metro Manila. According to the 2024 census, it has a population of 481,949 people.

Imus was the site of two major Katipunero victories during the Philippine Revolution against Spain. The Battle of Imus was fought on September 3, 1896, and the Battle of Alapan, on May 28, 1898, the day when the first Philippine flag was flown making Imus the "Flag Capital of the Philippines." Both events are celebrated annually in the city. The Imus Historical Museum honors the city's history with historical reenactment of scenes from the revolution.

Although Imus is legally designated as the provincial capital of Cavite, it is not the seat of government. The provincial capitol, alongside most offices of the provincial government, remains located in the former provincial capital, Trece Martires. Imus was officially converted into a component city following a referendum on June 30, 2012.

== Etymology ==
The name Imus comes from Tagalog imos or imus, meaning "cape" or "headland."

== History ==
=== Early history ===
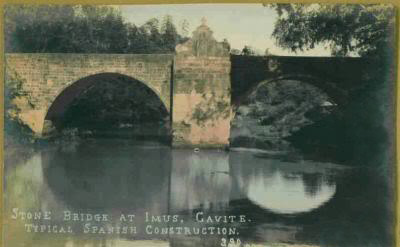
Bridge of Isabel II in the early 1900s

Like Cavite City (originally called Cavite La Punta) and Noveleta (La Tierra Alta), Imus used to be a part of Cavite el Viejo (now Kawit), whose parish church was built by the Jesuits during the administration of Archbishop Miguel Garcia Serrano, 1618–1629. For more than a century and a half the people of Imus had to endure walking or traveling 4.5 kilometers (2.8 mi) of dirt road to attend religious services or transact official business in the city proper. The difficulty of communication between Imus and Cavite el Viejo was a long-standing complaint of the Imuseños until another religious order, the Augustinian Recollects, as a consequence of the British occupation of Manila in 1762, established a parish church in Imus, in what is now known as Bayang Luma.

However, the church site was far from the estate house of the 11,100 hectares (27,000 acres) hacienda acquired in 1686 by the Recollect Corporation, and when the church was destroyed by the strong typhoon of September 1779, the Recollect Friars transferred it to barrio Toclong, and finally to sitio de Balangon, now the city plaza of Imus.

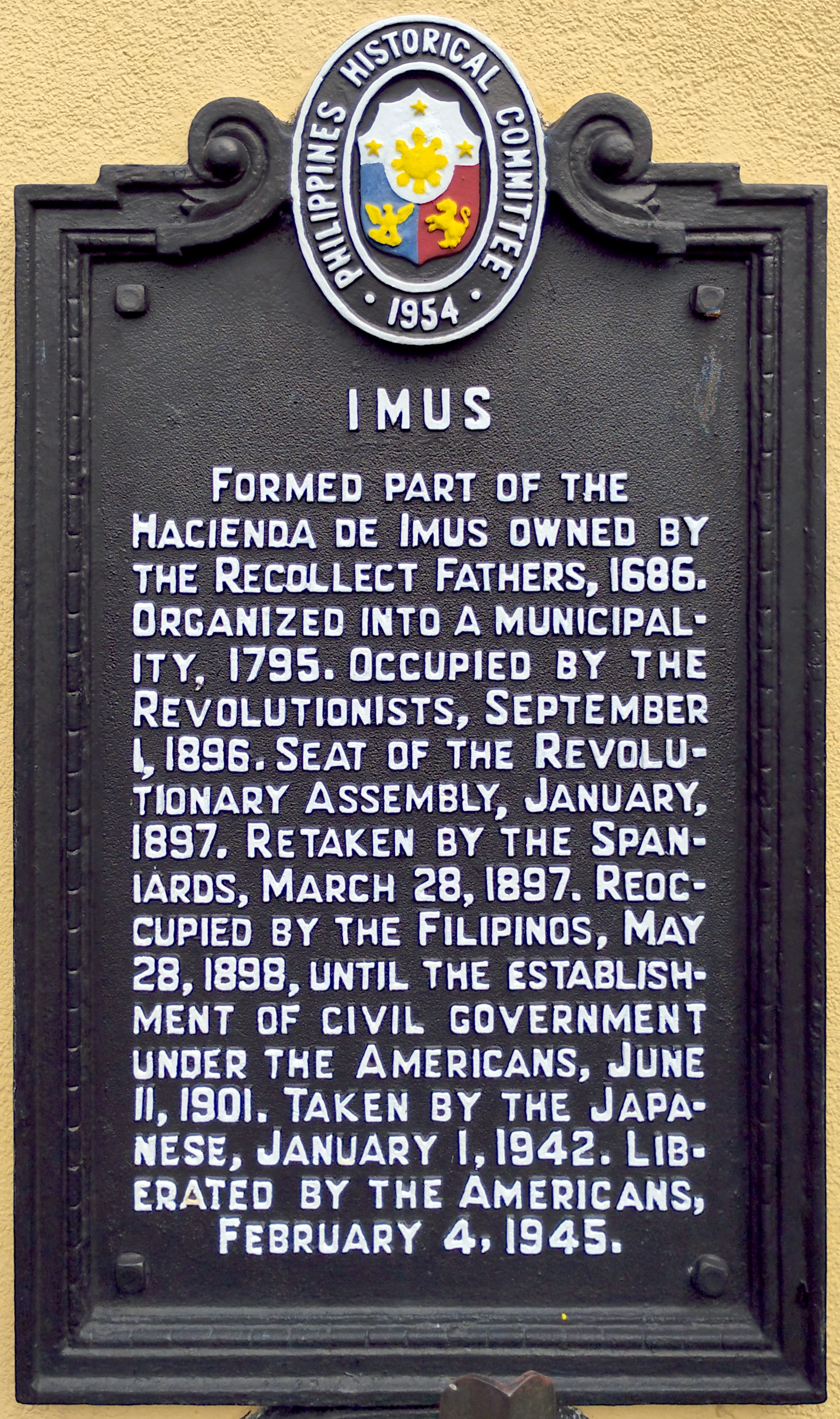
National historical marker installed in 1954 at the town plaza

With the establishment of the Recollect parish the people of Imus gained their religious emancipation from the Jesuit-run parish of Cavite el Viejo. In 1774, Recollect Fr. Pedro San Buenaventura petitioned the government to "separate the inquilinos (tenants) of Imus from the political jurisdiction of the government of "Cavite el Viejo". After a considerable time of waiting, the petition was granted and Imus became an independent municipality on October 3, 1795. The 1818 Spanish census showed the area had 2,033 native families and 125 Spanish-Filipino families.

On May 28, 1898, Imus gained its independence from Spanish colonial rule after the last remaining stronghold of forces from the Spanish empire had been defeated in the Battle of Alapan as headed by General Emilio Aguinaldo. This battle led to the Philippine Declaration of Independence in Kawit on June 12, 1898. The modern flag of the Philippines was first unfurled in victory during this battle as they march their way to the present day Cavite City, together with the captured forces of Spain.

In commemoration of the event, a Battle of Alapan marker was constructed inside the compound of Alapan Elementary School on May 28, 1998, and was inaugurated by President Fidel V. Ramos. Although on May 28, 2014, a new marker and the Imus National Heritage Park were inaugurated at Barangay Alapan 2-A to make the initially constructed marker more accessible to the public.

On October 15, 1903, the Philippine Commission enacted Act No. 947, merging the adjacent towns of Bacoor and Perez-Dasmariñas with Imus. Bacoor was later separated from Imus in 1906, followed by Perez-Dasmariñas in 1917.

=== Modern history ===
On June 11, 1977, then President Ferdinand Marcos issued Presidential Decree No. 1163, which transferred the provincial capital of Cavite from Trece Martires to Imus. There is no other enabling law after that, that specifies the capital of Cavite

On May 28, 2008, National Flag Day, the city celebrated the First Wagayway Festival (Flag-Waving Festival) signifying the very first unfurling of the Flag of the Philippines during the Battle of Alapan on May 28, 1898, against the Spanish colonizers. The battle was a major victory for General Emilio Aguinaldo (later the first president of the Philippine Republic) during the Philippine Revolution, which eventually led to the Philippine Declaration of Independence from Spain on June 12, 1898, in nearby Kawit.

The five-day event was highlighted by the historical reenactment of events from the sewing of the flag by Filipino exiles in Hong Kong, the Battle of Alapan, to the defeat of the Filipinos by the American troops silencing the dreams of an independent Philippines. The reenactment included students, city employees and barangay officials.

The festival was launched by then mayor, Emmanuel Maliksi, who reminded the people that the core of the celebration is love and respect for the Philippine flag, which symbolizes freedom and love for the country. Among the guests present was the former Prime Minister of the Philippines, Cesar Virata, who is a grandnephew of General Emilio Aguinaldo.

=== Lone District of Imus ===
A bill was filed by Representative Joseph Abaya with co-authors Congressman Pidi Barzaga and Crispin Remulla creating the municipality of Imus as a lone Legislative districts of the Philippines. The bill was supported by Senator Panfilo Lacson, Senator Dick Gordon and Senator Bong Revilla. On October 22, 2009, Republic Act 9727 was approved by the President of the Philippines creating the lone District Imus as the "Third District of Cavite".

=== Cityhood ===
During the 10th Congress (1995–1998), a House Bill (HB) no. 08960 was filed by Congressman Renato P. Dragon together with the other cityhood bills for Bacoor (HB 08959) and Dasmariñas (HB 08931). The bills did not pass the Congress. Congressman Erineo Maliksi filed House Bill no. HB01989 on August 3, 2010, which created the city of Imus. The bill was enacted into law as Republic Act No. 10161. The plebiscite required to ratify the conversion of the municipality of Imus into a component city was scheduled June 30, 2012. Republic Act No. 10161 was ratified by the registered voters of Imus through a plebiscite conducted on that day, converted the municipality of Imus in the Province of Cavite into a component city to be known as the City of Imus. There were about 22,742 voters who cast their ballots in the town's 453 polling precincts. The "yes" votes won overwhelmingly getting 20,438 while the "no" votes got 2,304.

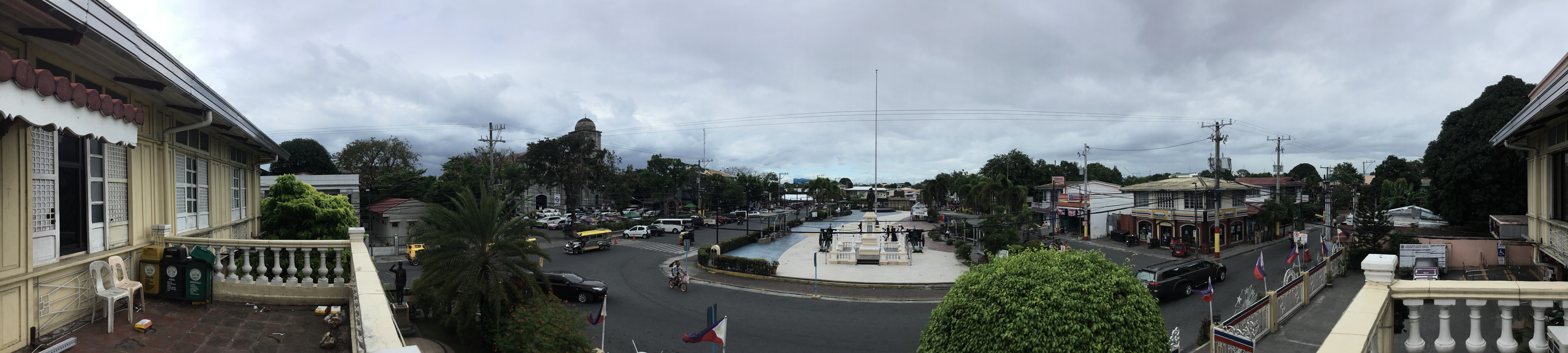
Imus City Plaza, view from the old Imus City Hall

== Geography ==
=== Topography ===
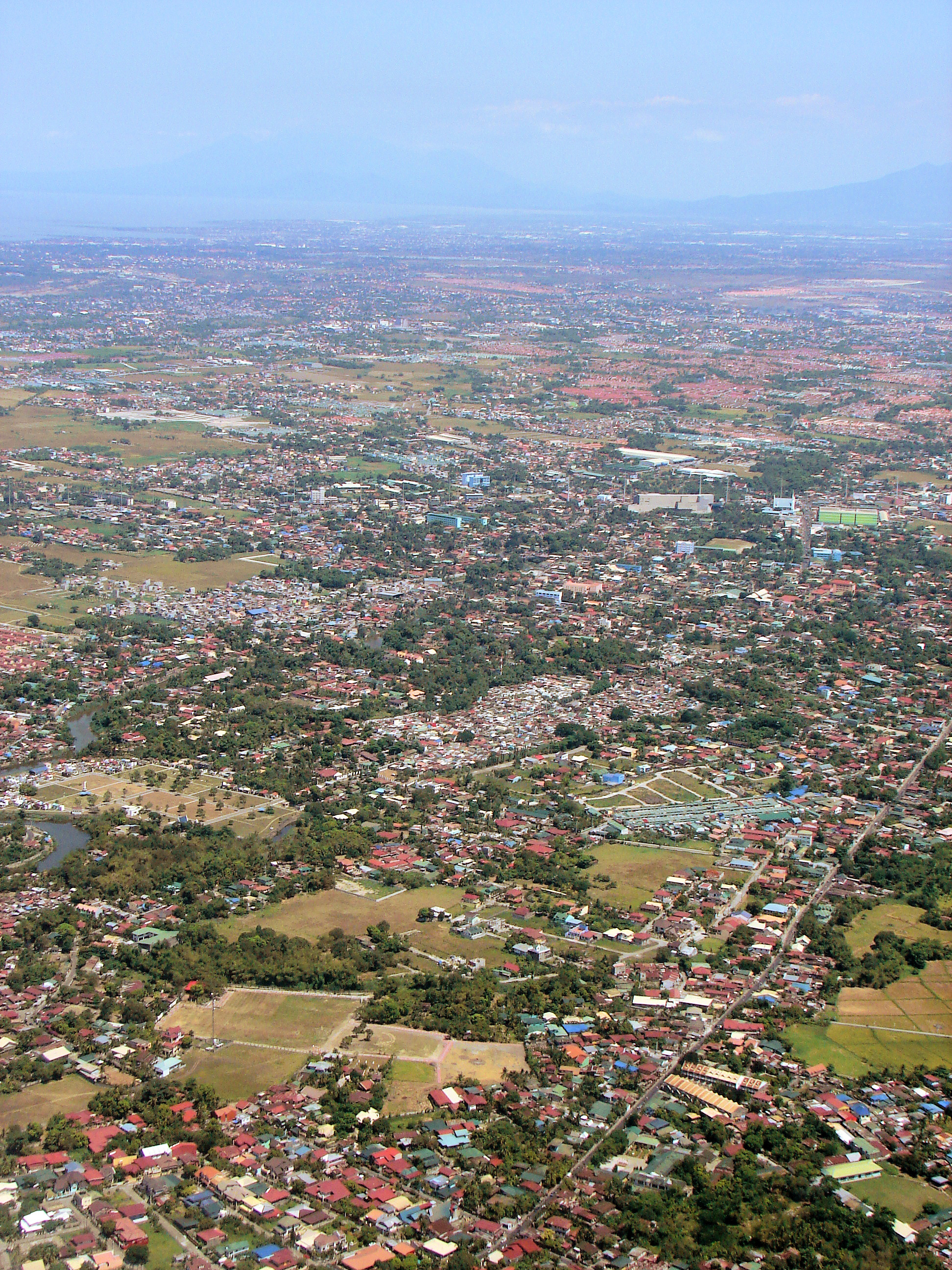
Aerial view of Imus. Located on center right is Nueno Avenue, with the Cathedral and belfry (also on center right). In the foreground is Medicion I St. that leads to Binakayan, Kawit.

Imus covers a land total area of 6,470 ha (16,000 acres) or 64.70 km^{2} (24.98 sq mi), approximately 6.8% of the total land area of the province of Cavite, which is 1,427.06 square kilometers (550.99 sq mi) The almost rectangular inland city of Cavite is bounded by the municipalities of Kawit and Noveleta to the north, and General Trias to the west; by the cities of Bacoor to the east and Dasmariñas to the south.

The city is located near the Metropolitan Manila area, just 20 kilometers (12 mi) south of Manila. With the continuous expansion of Metro Manila, this local government unit is now included in the Greater Manila area, which reaches Lipa City in its southernmost part.

=== Climate ===
Climate data for Imus City, Cavite
Month	Jan	Feb	Mar	Apr	May	Jun	Jul	Aug	Sep	Oct	Nov	Dec	Year
Mean daily maximum °C (°F)	29 (84)	30 (86)	32 (90)	34 (93)	32 (90)	31 (88)	29 (84)	29 (84)	29 (84)	30 (86)	30 (86)	29 (84)	30 (87)
Mean daily minimum °C (°F)	20 (68)	20 (68)	21 (70)	22 (72)	24 (75)	25 (77)	24 (75)	24 (75)	24 (75)	23 (73)	22 (72)	21 (70)	23 (73)
Average precipitation mm (inches)	10 (0.4)	10 (0.4)	12 (0.5)	27 (1.1)	94 (3.7)	153 (6.0)	206 (8.1)	190 (7.5)	179 (7.0)	120 (4.7)	54 (2.1)	39 (1.5)	1,094 (43)
Average rainy days	5.2	4.5	6.4	9.2	19.7	24.3	26.9	25.7	24.4	21.0	12.9	9.1	189.3
Source: Meteoblue

=== Barangays ===
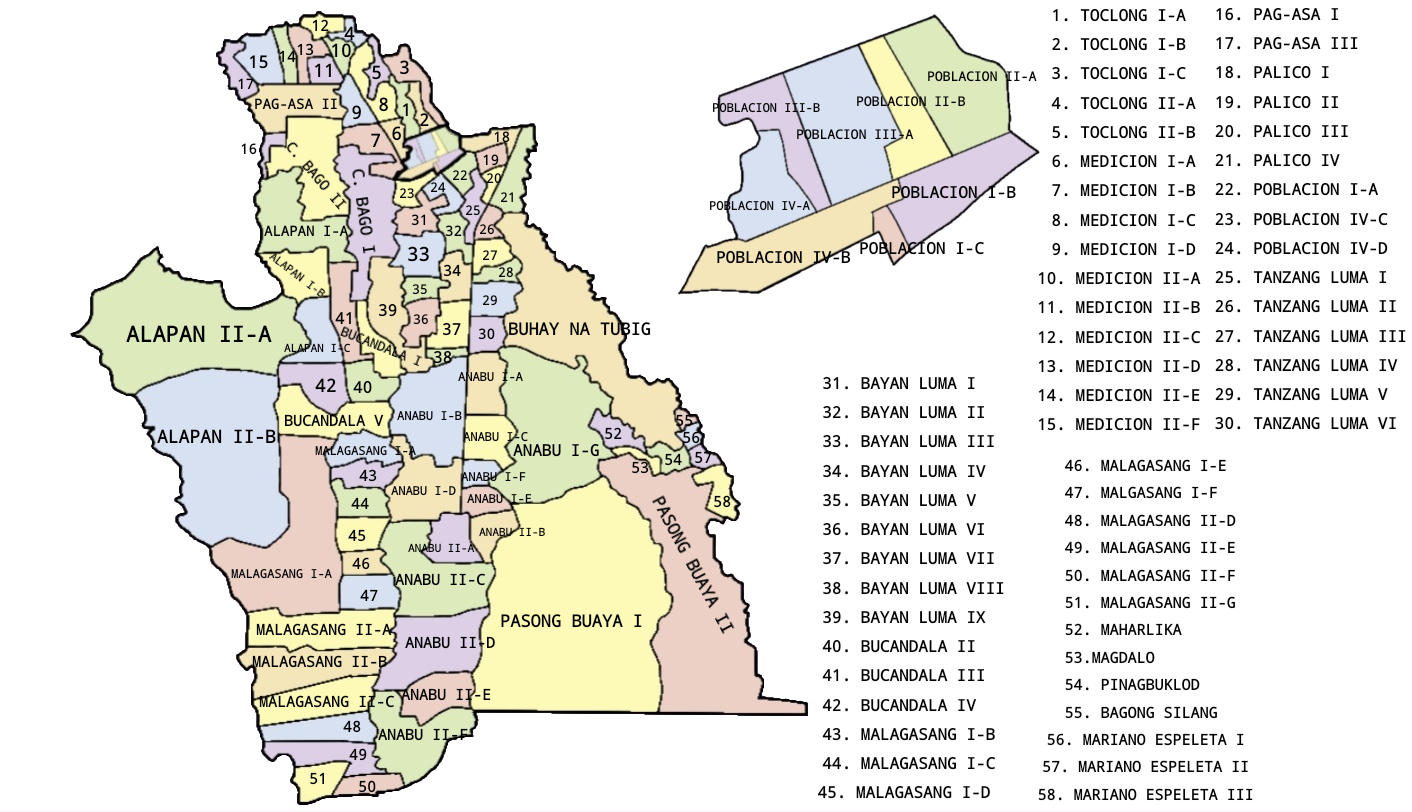
A map of Imus presenting its barangays

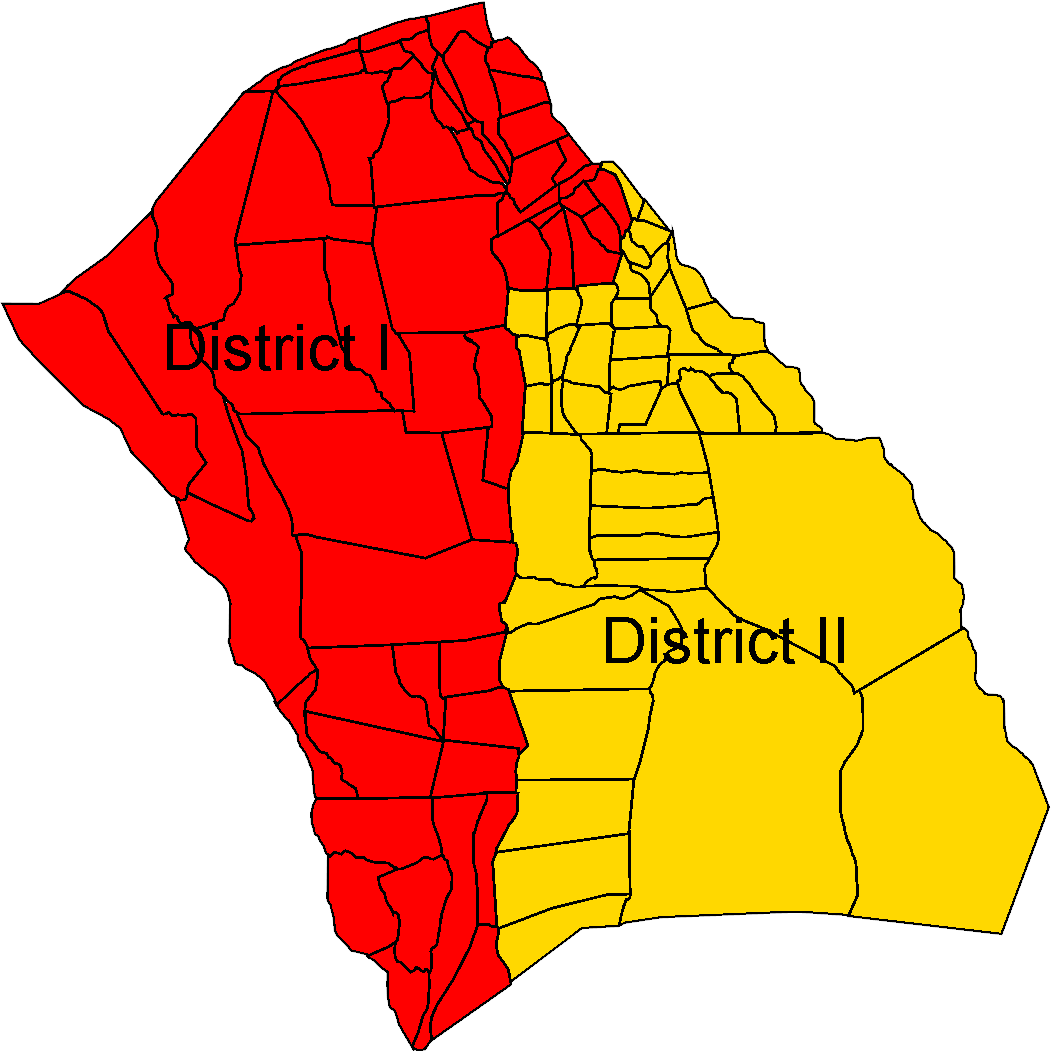
Map of electoral districts of Imus

Imus is politically subdivided into 97 barangays, as indicated below and the image herein. Each barangay consists of puroks and some have sitios.

These barangays are grouped into two local and national electoral districts officially called Imus West and Imus East, which are represented in the Congress by their respective representatives and city council by their respective councilors. In 1998, the town was composed of 21 barangays; these former barangays were further subdivided to make the current collection of 97.

Barangays that have been subdivided retain the original name, with distinctions made using letters or numbers. For example, names ending in numbers, such as Medicion 1, are subdivided with capital letters (Medicion 1-A, Medicion 1-B, etc.), while names ending in letters, like Bucandala or Bayan Luma, are distinguished by numbers (Bucandala 1, Bayan Luma 2, etc.). The exceptions to this system are Barangay Buhay na Tubig and the barangays within the Bahayang Pag-asa Subdivision—Mariano Espeleta I to III, Pinagbuklod, Magdalo, Maharlika, and Bahayang Pag-asa (later renamed Bagong Silang).

District I

- Alapan I-A
- Alapan I-B
- Alapan I-C
- Alapan II-A
- Alapan II-B
- Bucandala I
- Bucandala II
- Bucandala III
- Bucandala IV
- Bucandala V
- Carsadang Bago I
- Carsadang Bago II
- Malagasang I-A
- Malagasang I-B
- Malagasang I-C
- Malagasang I-D
- Malagasang I-E
- Malagasang I-F
- Malagasang I-G
- Malagasang II-A
- Malagasang II-B
- Malagasang II-C
- Malagasang II-D
- Malagasang II-E
- Malagasang II-F
- Malagasang II-G
- Medicion I-A
- Medicion I-B
- Medicion I-C
- Medicion I-D
- Medicion II-A
- Medicion II-B
- Medicion II-C
- Medicion II-D
- Medicion II-E
- Medicion II-F
- Pag-asa I
- Pag-asa II
- Pag-asa III
- Poblacion I-A
- Poblacion I-B
- Poblacion I-C
- Poblacion II-A
- Poblacion II-B
- Poblacion III-A
- Poblacion III-B
- Poblacion IV-A
- Poblacion IV-B
- Poblacion IV-C
- Poblacion IV-D
- Toclong I-A
- Toclong I-B
- Toclong I-C
- Toclong II-A
- Toclong II-B

District II

- Anabu I-A
- Anabu I-B
- Anabu I-C
- Anabu I-D
- Anabu I-E
- Anabu I-F
- Anabu I-G
- Anabu II-A
- Anabu II-B
- Anabu II-C
- Anabu II-D
- Anabu II-E
- Anabu II-F
- Bagong Silang (Bahayang Pag-asa)
- Bayan Luma I
- Bayan Luma II
- Bayan Luma III
- Bayan Luma IV
- Bayan Luma V
- Bayan Luma VI
- Bayan Luma VII
- Bayan Luma VIII
- Bayan Luma IX
- Buhay na Tubig
- Magdalo
- Maharlika
- Mariano Espeleta I
- Mariano Espeleta II
- Mariano Espeleta III
- Palico I
- Palico II
- Palico III
- Palico IV
- Pasong Buaya I
- Pasong Buaya II
- Pinagbuklod
- Tanzang Luma I
- Tanzang Luma II
- Tanzang Luma III
- Tanzang Luma IV (Southern City)
- Tanzang Luma V
- Tanzang Luma VI

== Demographics ==
Population census of Imus
Year	Pop.	±% p.a.
1903	12,912	—
1918	13,940	+0.51%
1939	18,039	+1.24%
1948	23,685	+3.07%
1960	31,660	+2.45%
1970	43,686	+3.27%
1975	48,566	+2.15%
1980	59,103	+4.00%
1990	92,125	+4.54%
1995	177,408	+13.06%
2000	195,482	+2.10%
2007	253,158	+3.63%
2010	301,624	+6.58%
2015	403,785	+5.71%
2020	496,794	+4.46%
2024	481,949	−0.73%
Source: Philippine Statistics Authority

In the 2024 census, the population of Imus was 481,949 people, with a density of 7,400 inhabitants per square kilometre or 19,000 inhabitants per square mile.

=== Religion ===
The majority of the inhabitants of Imus are Christian, composed mostly of Catholics, Protestants, Members Church of God International, Aglipayans, and of other various sects. There is also sizable population of Muslims due to the influx of migrants from Mindanao.

Imus is the see of the Diocese of Imus, which is coterminous with the province. Imus Cathedral, which is under the patronage of the canonically-crowned Nuestra Señora del Pilar de Imus (Our Lady of the Pillar of Imus), is the seat of the Bishop of the Diocese of Imus. The city served as the host diocese during the 5th Asian Youth Day on November 20–27, 2009.

== Economy ==
Poverty incidence of Imus (%)

Source: Philippine Statistics Authority

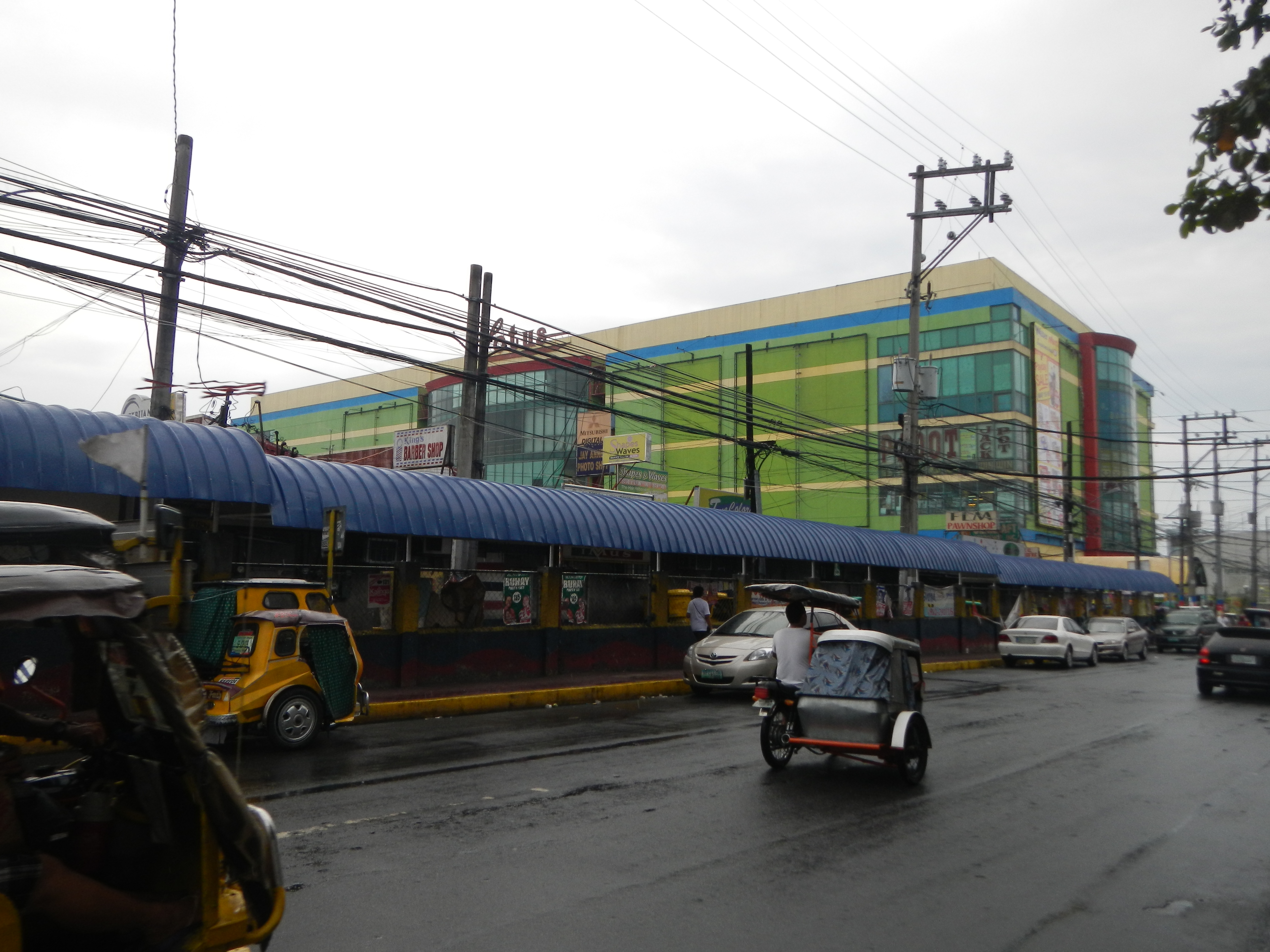
Lotus Mall

Imus is the foremost banking center of Cavite with numerous financial institutions and also an excellent banking infrastructure is being propagated by the present government to spearhead the development of the city. The city of Imus has shown a steady rise in its income earning a 1st class income classification in 1986. Its 9,701-hectare (23,970-acre) land area serves as home to a population of 195,482. In 1993, Imus had 1,369 commercial establishments, 200 manufacturing establishments and 41 financial institutions. Ten years hence, it has 6,636 licensed business establishments that include 4,376 commercial establishments, 300 manufacturing establishments and 190 financial institutions.

With a comfortable 18 km (11 mi) distance from Metro Manila, Imus serves as a favorable site for industrial establishments such as the 200-hectare (490-acre) Imus Informal Industrial Estate and Anabu Hills Industrial Estate. Corporations that are 100% Filipino-owned include Annie's Candy Manufacturing, Inc., CKL Industries and Liwayway Mktg. Corp. Factories of partly Filipino-owned corporations include Champan Garment Corp., Hayag Motorworks & Machine Shop and San Miguel-Yamamura Asia Corp.. Foreign-owned corporations include Frontline Garments Corp. and EDS MFG, Inc., which produces automotive wiring harness. Imus is also the home of the Anabu Handmade Paper Products, a producer of handmade paper and paper products.

The Imus Commercial/Business District along Nueño Avenue (also called Imus Boulevard) is the center of commerce in the city. The Imus Public Market (Pamilihang Bayan ng Imus) is the hub of trade in the district. The market is divided into 25 zones and has 805 stalls. Commercial, industrial and manufacturing industries owned by Taiwanese, Japanese and Filipino investors can also be found there. There are 3,601 commercial establishments duly registered in the city as of March 1999.

Eighteen major industrial establishments with a total capitalization of 1.311 billion pesos have established their base at the Imus Informal Industrial Estate providing local employment to an estimated 13,478 people as of December 1998. Located just along the stretch of the General Emilio Aguinaldo Highway, the main highway of Cavite traversing the city from north to south, the 200-hectare informal industrial estate houses manufacturing companies owned by foreign and Filipino investors. Imus has ventured to the export of automotive wire harness and electrical components, acrylic sheets and lighting fixtures, processed foods, shellcraft, bamboo, rattan and woodcraft, furniture, garments and novelty items to other countries. Several subdivisions and mass housing projects and the establishment of factories and small-scale industries in many of its barangays have resulted in a movement of population into the city.

However, heavy traffic congestion caused by the 'buhos' (pour) system, inadequate road signage and systems, poor road maintenance, mixed vehicles (tricycles, pedicabs, bicycles, etc.), unjustified traffic priority schemes and rampant violation of traffic rules is observable on roads. This is causing headaches to travelers specifically along Aguinaldo Highway. In an attempt to improve road conditions, traffic lights were installed in Aguinaldo highway and on other busy intersections in the city in 2015.

Ayala Land Inc. is investing Php 70 B for an estate Vermosa, it will be accessible by Muntinlupa–Cavite Expressway. Villar City is closer to the city center; the Cavite–Laguna Expressway has an access to that, which is situated in General Trias.

Agriculture, particularly rice production, is still practiced in the city.

== Government ==
=== Local government ===
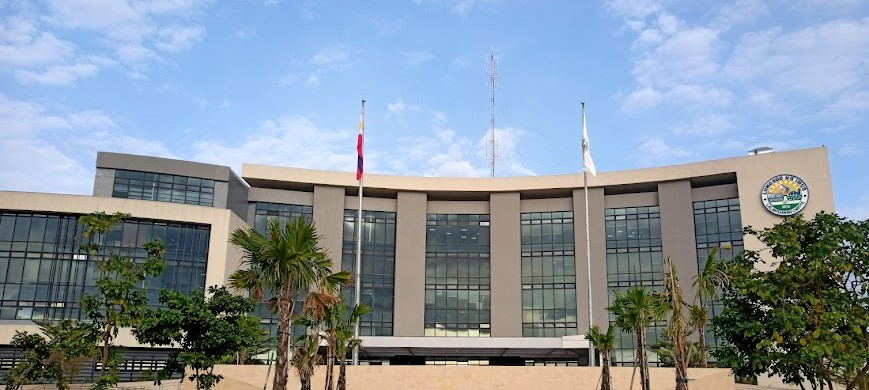
Imus Government Center

=== Elected officials ===
City government of Imus (June 30, 2022 - June 30, 2025)
Representative
Adrian Jay C. Advincula
Mayor
Alex L. Advincula
Vice Mayor
Homer Saquilayan
Sangguniang Panlungsod
Lloyd Emman D. Jaro (National Unity Party)	Lloren Dionela G. Saquilayan (National Unity Party)
Larry Boy S. Nato (National Unity Party)	Jelyn Maliksi (Liberal)
Dennis Lacson (Partido Reporma)	Darwin Remulla (National Unity Party)
Mark Villanueva (National Unity Party)	Exequiel B. Ropeta (PDP–Laban)
Sherwin Lares Comia (National Unity Party)	Atty. Wency Lara (National Unity Party)
Enzo Asistio Ferrer (National Unity Party)	Igi Revilla Ocampo (National Unity Party)
Association of Barangay Council President Reymundo Ramirez	Sangguniang Kabataan Federation President Glian Piolo Ilagan of Bayan Luma VI
Provincial Board Members
Shernan Jaro (National Unity Party)	Arnel Cantimbuhan (National Unity Party)
Chelsea Jillian Sarno (Sangguniang Kabataan)	Provincial Federation President

=== List of heads ===
==== Gobernadorcillos ====
- Licerio Topacio (1888–1890)
- Cayetano Topacio (1890–1892)
- Angel Buenaventura (1892–1894)

==== Capitanes Municipal ====
- Bernardino Paredes (1894–1896)
- Jose Tagle (1896–1897)
- Valentin Conejo (1898–1900)

==== Municipal presidents ====
- Donato Virata (1900–1903)
- Juan Viña (1903)
- Licerio Topacio (1903)
- Pedro Buenaventura (1903)
- Pantaleon Garcia (1904–1905)
- Felipe Viña (1905–1909)
- Maximo Abad (1910–1912)
- Felipe Viña (1912–1915)
- Pablo Palma (acting: 1912–1913)
- Cecilio Kamantigue (1915–1919)
- Felix Paredes (1919–1925)
- Blas Mallari (1925–1928)
- Epifanio Gabriel (1928–1931)

==== Mayors ====
#	Mayor	Start of term	End of term
1	Dominador Camerino	1931	1940
–	Geronimo Maluto	1931	1932
3	Elpidio Osteria	1940	1944
4	Alfredo Saqui	1944	1945
5	Fortunato Remulla	1945	1945
6	Dominador Ilano	1945	1946
–	Epifanio Gabriel	1946	1946
(6)	Dominador Ilano	1946	1963
–	Rodrigo Camia	1960	1960
(1)	Dominador Camerino	1964	1967
7	Manuel Paredes	1967	1967
8	Jose V. Jamir	1968	1986
–	Mariano Reyes	1968	1968
–	Mariano Reyes	1969	1969
–	Damian Villaseca	1986	1986
–	Wilfredo Garde	1986	1988
9	Ayong Maliksi	February 2, 1988	1998
–	Ricardo C. Paredes Sr.	1998	1998
10	Oscar A. Jaro	June 30, 1998	June 30, 2001
11	Homer Saquilayan	June 30, 2001	March 30, 2004
(10)	Oscar A. Jaro	March 30, 2004	June 30, 2004
(11)	Homer Saquilayan	June 30, 2004	March 21, 2007
(10)	Oscar A. Jaro	March 21, 2007	March 28, 2007
(11)	Homer Saquilayan	March 28, 2007	April 25, 2007
(10)	Oscar A. Jaro	April 25, 2007	June 30, 2007
12	Emmanuel L. Maliksi	June 30, 2007	June 30, 2010
(11)	Homer Saquilayan	June 30, 2010	December 28, 2011
(12)	Emmanuel L. Maliksi	December 29, 2011	March 18, 2013
(11)	Homer Saquilayan	March 18, 2013	April 11, 2013
(12)	Emmanuel L. Maliksi	April 12, 2013	June 30, 2022
13	Alex L. Advincula	June 30, 2022	present

=== City seal ===
The city seal of Imus

- Inscriptions. The official seal of the City of Imus bears the inscriptions Lungsod ng Imus, Lalawigan ng Cavite (City of Imus, Province of Cavite), the year 2012 representing the year of the city charter.
- Symbolism. The nine sun's rays symbolizes hope and bright future. The gear symbolizes trade and industry. The church signifies the separation of church and state, and the rich cultural traditions. The Imus City Hall building signifies heritage, peaceful and good living conditions and citizenry participation. The school and houses signifies community development and Christian endeavors. The satellite symbolizes technology. The road signifies the development of the city towards industrialization. The lady signifies Inang Bayan (Motherland) representing Filipino nationalism in the Battle of Alapan. The jeepney represents the entrepreneurial spirit of the Imuseños.
- Colors. Yellow represent the spirited, joyful and bright outlook of the people; blue denotes peace and order maintained through the unparalleled support of its citizenry; and green for growth and prosperity leading to the flfillment of its people's dream and aspirations.

== Notable personalities ==
- Ayong Maliksi, former PCSO chairman, former representative 3rd District, Cavite, former mayor of Imus, former Cavite governor
- Cesar E. A. Virata, former Prime Minister of the Philippines
- Chlaui Malayao, child actress from GMA Network
- Christian Bautista, singer, actor
- Gilbert Remulla, news anchor, TV host, former representative 2nd District, Cavite
- Jonvic Remulla, politician, Cavite governor and former vice-governor
- Kaye Abad, actress
- Leonardo Sarao, businessman and jeepney designer, founder of Sarao Motors
- Luis Antonio Tagle, Bishop Emeritus of the Diocese of Imus, Archbishop Emeritus of the Archdiocese of Manila, Filipino Cardinal, President, Caritas Internationalis, and Prefect of the Congregation for the Evangelization of Peoples
- Marcelito Pomoy, singer, Pilipinas Got Talent Season 2 Grand Winner
- Panfilo Lacson, senator, former Philippine National Police chief
- Terrence Romeo, professional basketball player for San Miguel Beermen
- Jose R. Velasco, national scientist, chemist and agriculturist
- Hilario Lara, National Scientist of the Philippines for Public Health
- Leonides Sarao Virata, economist
- Helena Benitez, former senator, educator
- Francisca Tirona, educator, co-founder of the Philippine Women's University
- Hilaria Aguinaldo, first wife of Gen. Emilio Aguinaldo
- Pablo, member of the Filipino boy band SB19
- Will Ashley, actor from GMA Network
- Angela Ken, singer-songwriter
- James Graham - actor from GMA Network
- Johnny Remulla, 29th and 31st Governor of Cavite

== Gallery ==
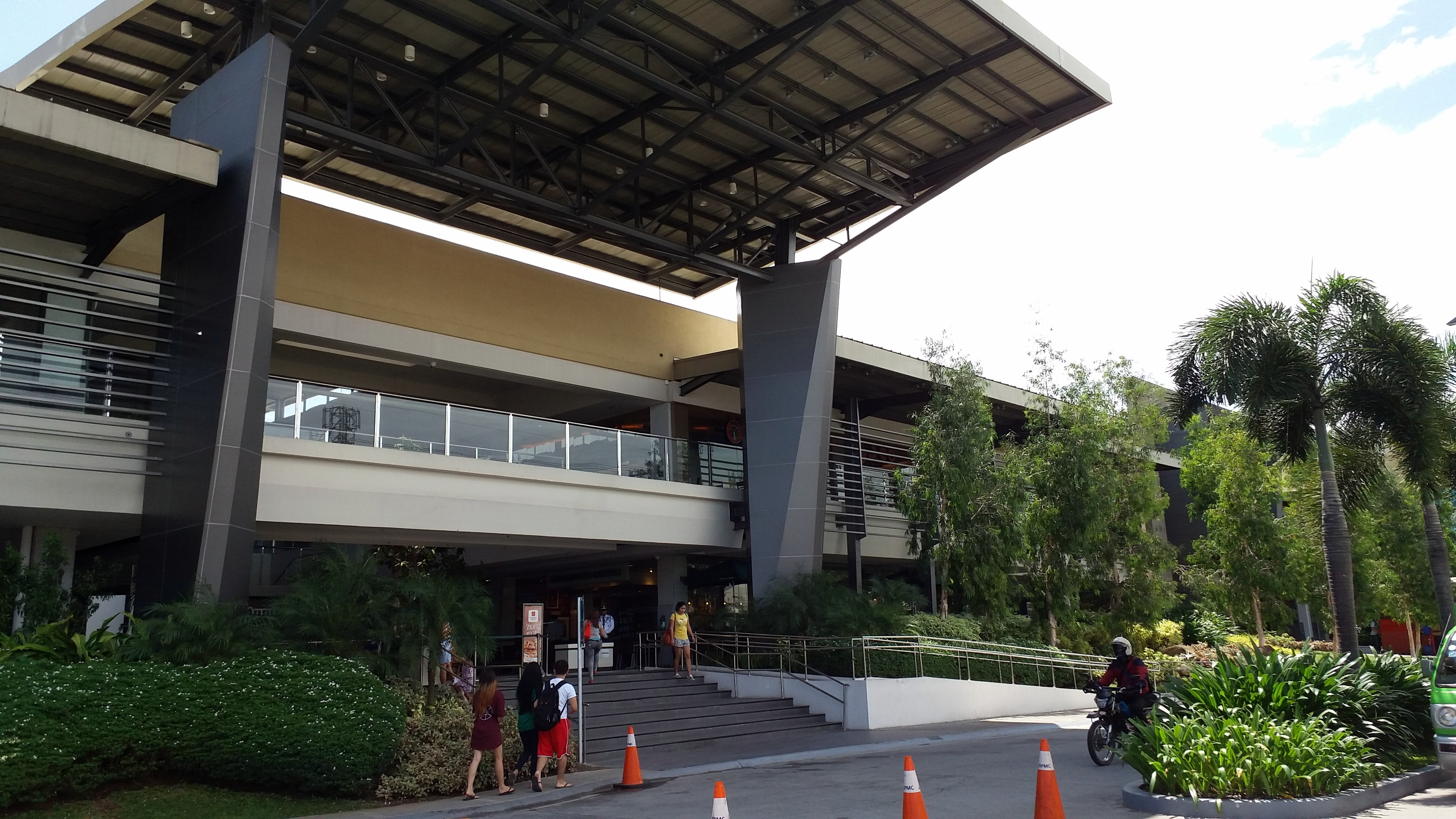
The District Imus, a community mall

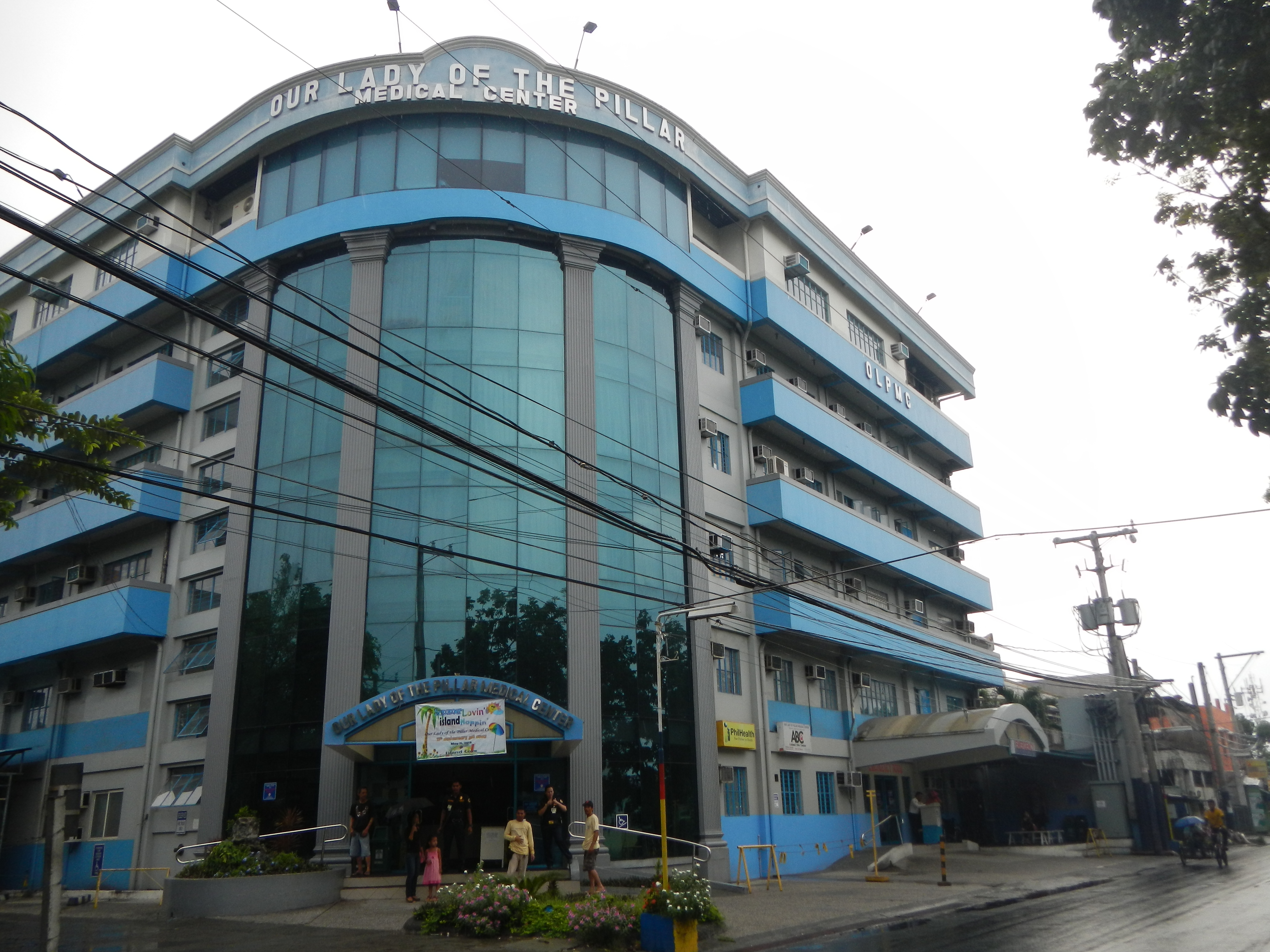
Our Lady of the Pillar Medical Center

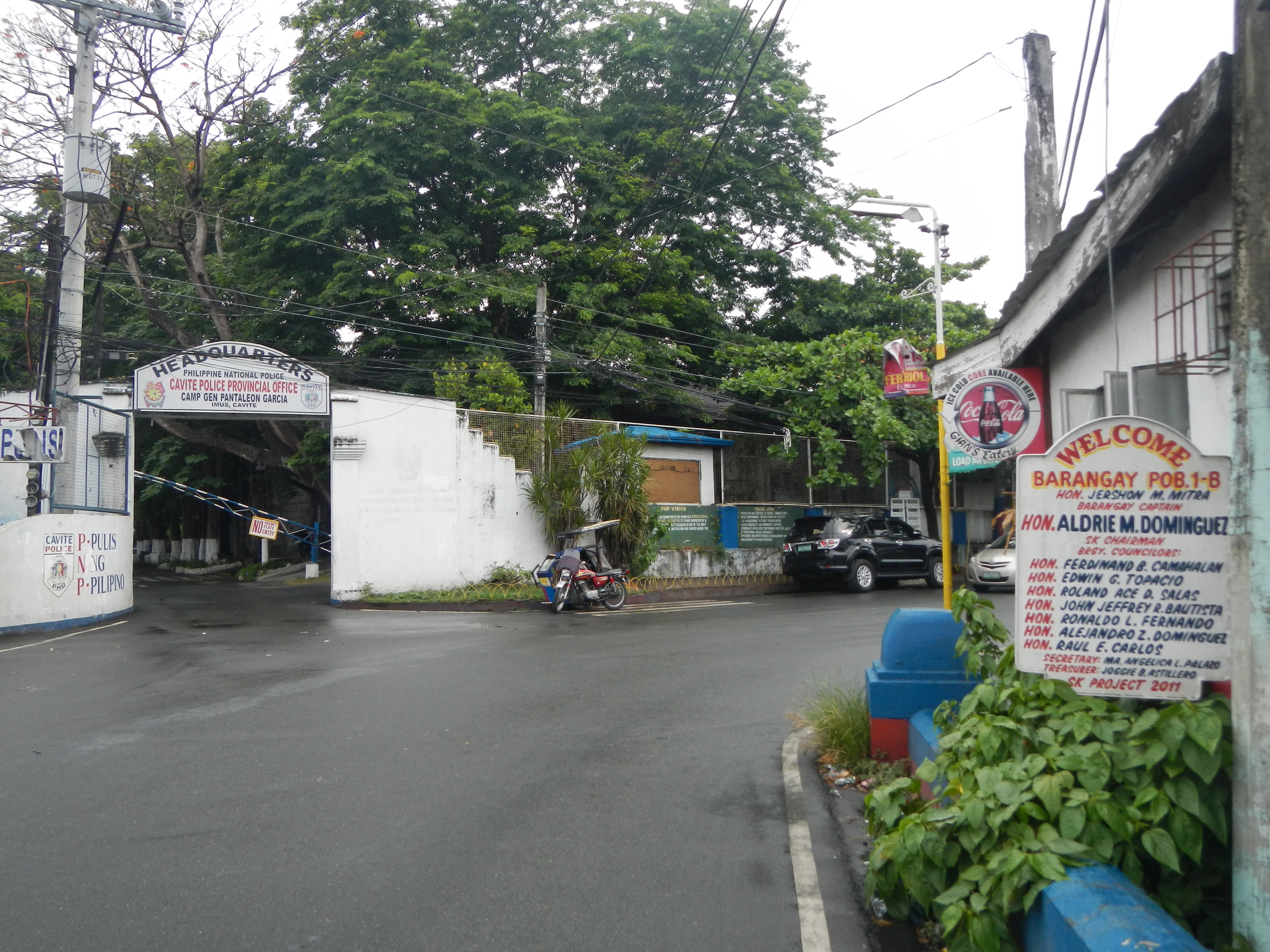
Camp Gen. Pantaleon Garcia, the Cavite Provincial Police Office, site of the Imus Arsenal

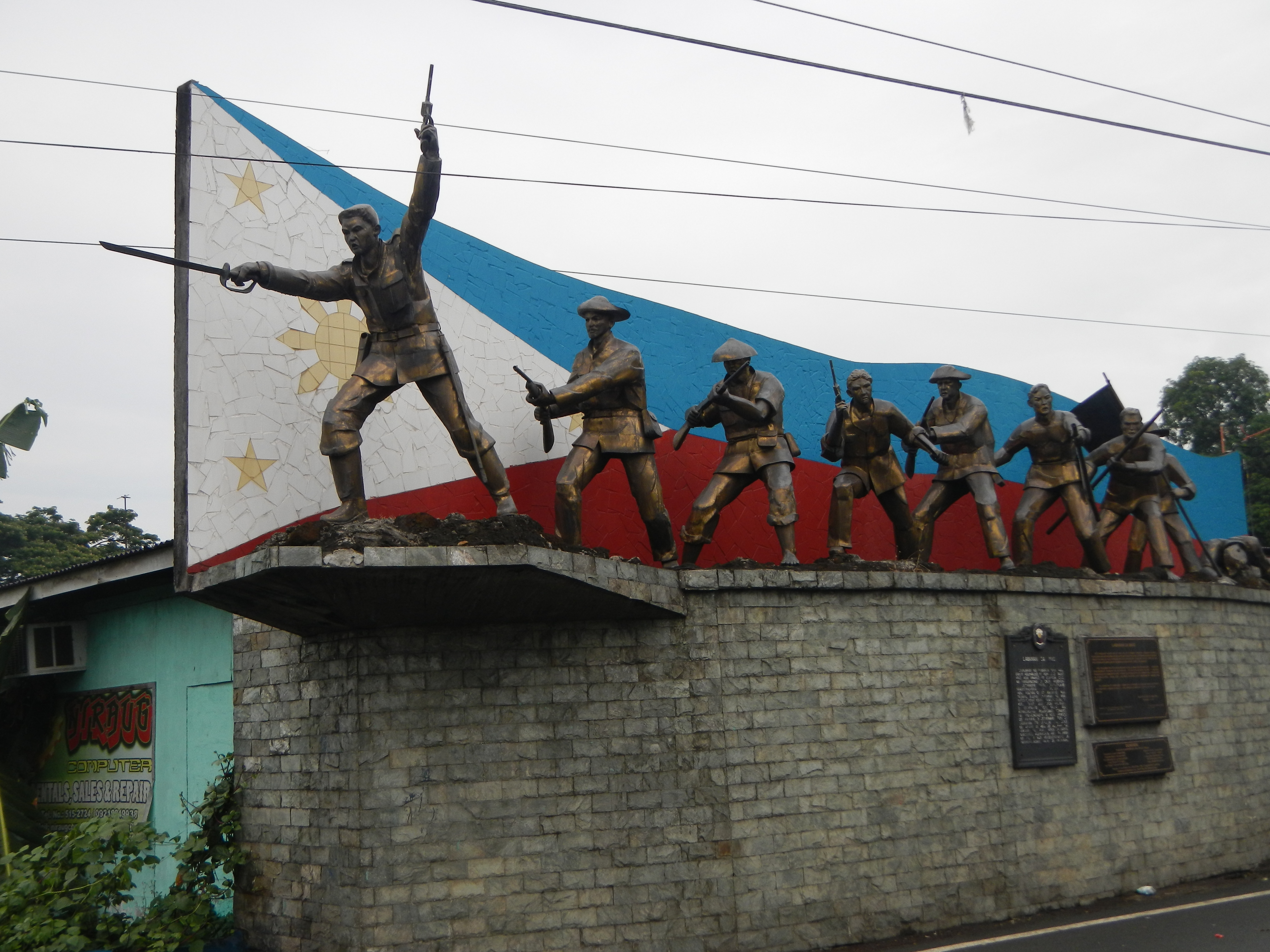
Battle of Imus Monument

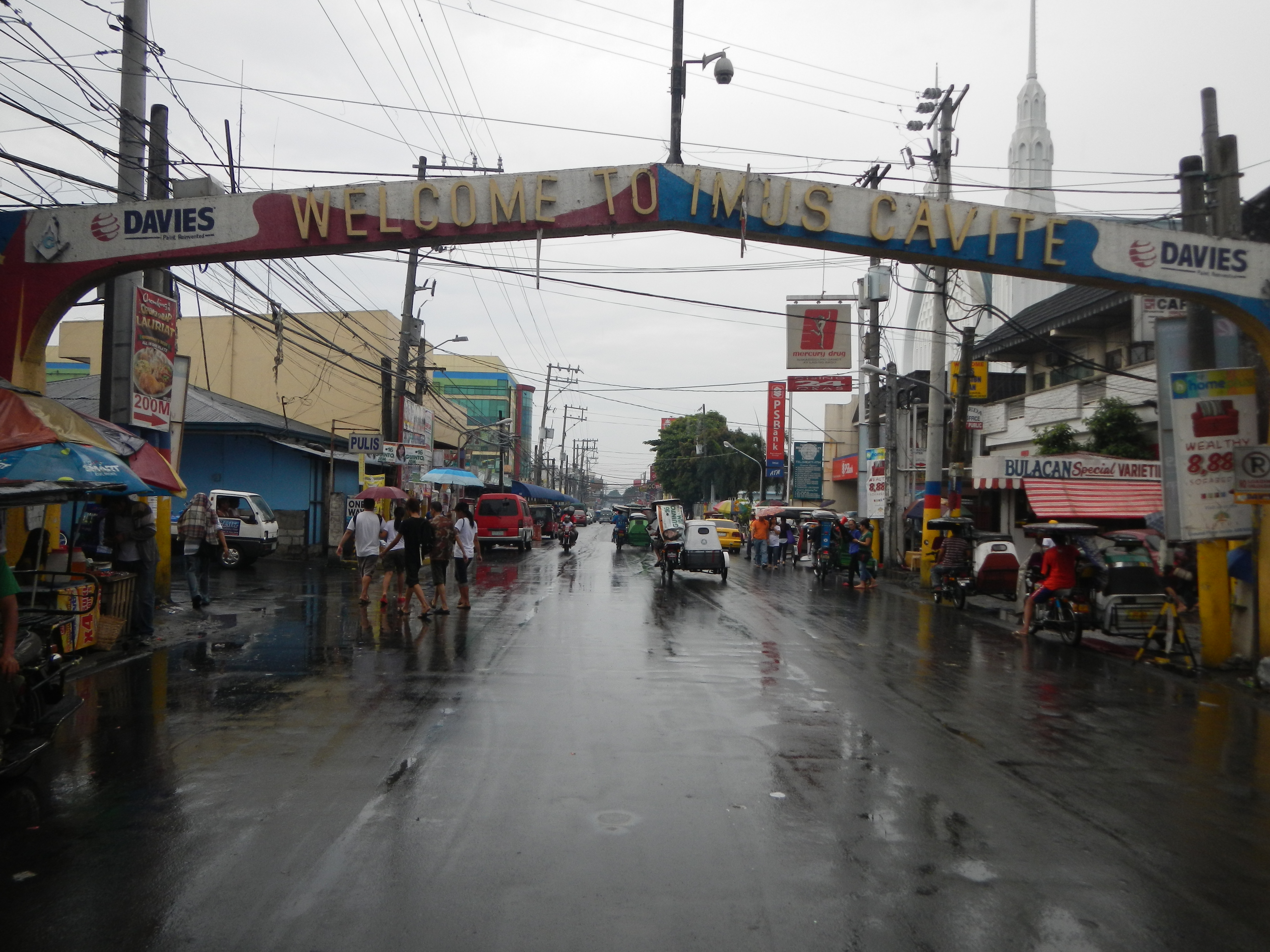
The welcome arch along Nueno Avenue (prior to its dismantling in 2023)

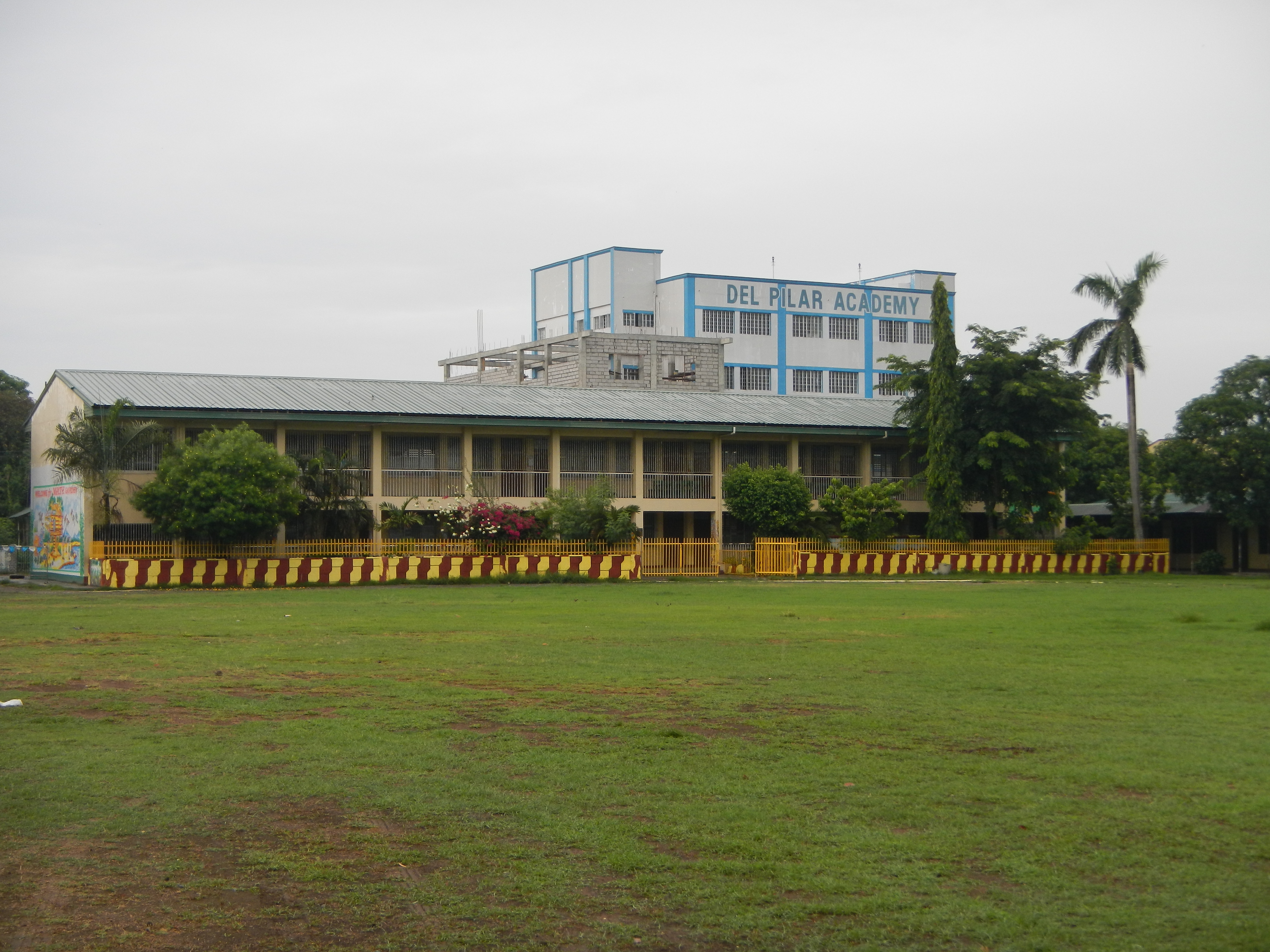
Del Pilar Academy (Blue Building) behind Imus Pilot Elementary School

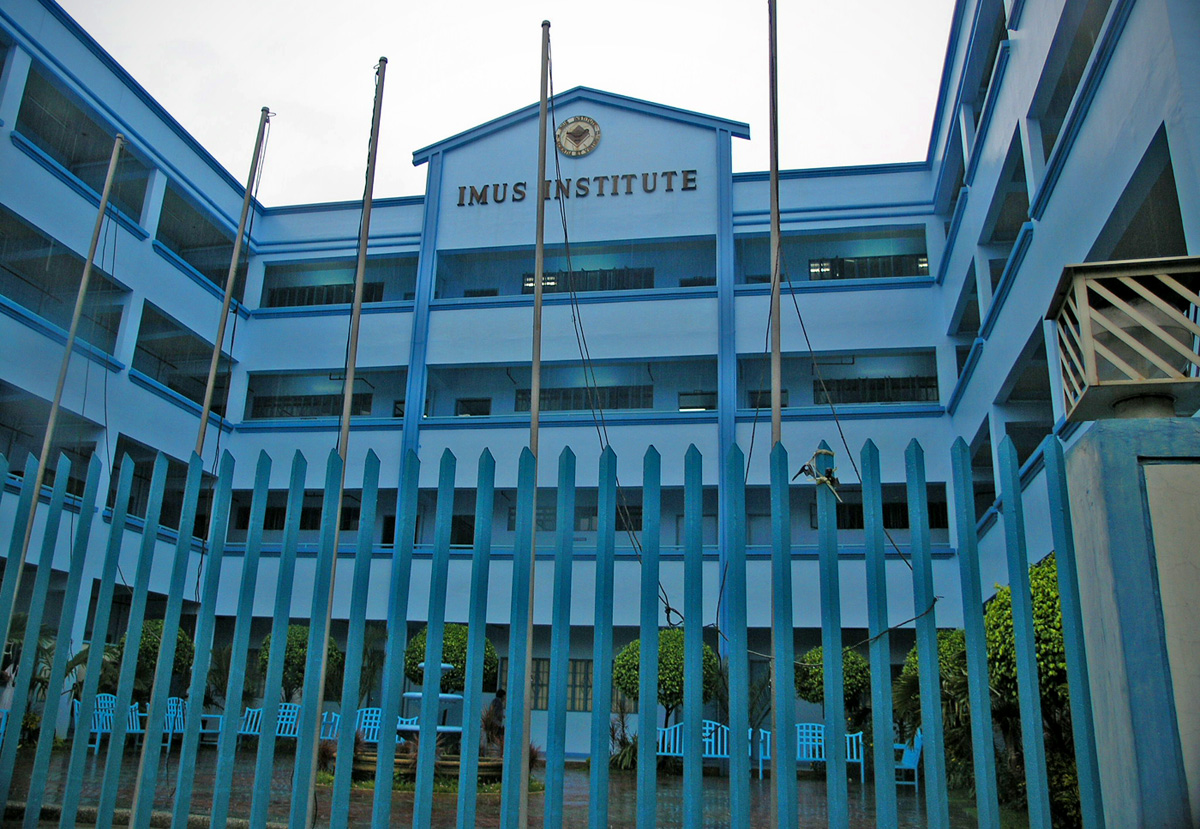
Imus Institute of Science and Technology (formerly Imus Institute)
