= Alfredo Verzosa =

Filipino bishop and Servant of God

Servant of God Alfredo Verzosa y Florentín
- Titular Bishop of Capsa; Bishop Emeritus of Lipa
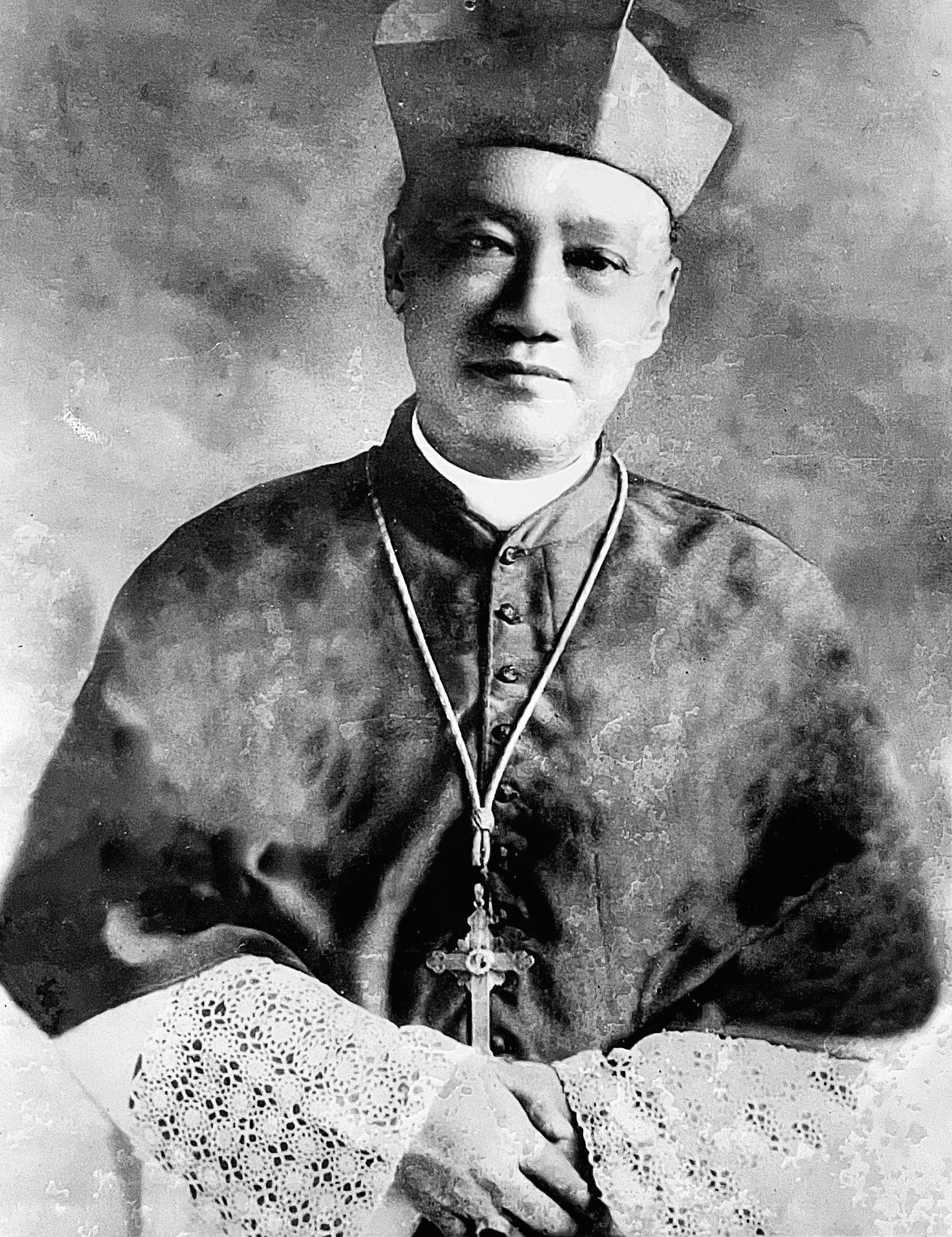
- Photograph of Bishop Alfredo Verzosa
- Church: Catholic Church
- Diocese: Lipa
- Appointed: 6 September 1916
- Term ended: 25 February 1951
- Predecessor: Giuseppe Petrelli
- Successor: Alejandro Olalia
- Other posts: Apostolic Administrator of Nueva Segovia (1926-1927); Titular Bishop of Capsa (1951-1954)

Orders
- Ordination: 24 December 1904 by Dennis Joseph Dougherty
- Consecration: 20 January 1917 by Giuseppe Petrelli
- Rank: Bishop

Personal details
- Born: Alfredo Verzosa y Florentín; 9 December 1877 Vigan, Ilocos Sur, Captaincy General of the Philippines
- Died: 27 June 1954 (aged 76) Vigan, Ilocos Sur, Philippines
- Buried: Cathedral of the Conversion of Saint Paul the Apostle, Vigan, Ilocos Sur, Philippines
- Denomination: Catholicism
- Education: Immaculate Conception Seminary in Vigan; Colegio de San Juan de Letran; University of Santo Tomas
- Motto: Disponit Omnia Suaviter (Disposes All Things Gently)
- Coat of arms

Alfredo Verzosa y Florentín (9 December 1877 – 27 June 1954) was the fourth native Filipino to be elevated as bishop of the Catholic Church and the first from Northern Luzon. He was also the first Ilocano bishop. He co-founded the Congregation of the Missionary Catechists of the Sacred Heart (MCSH), which focuses on education and administration within the church, especially catechesis. He has been declared Servant of God by Pope Benedict XVI and his cause for beatification is underway.

== Early years and the seminary ==
Alfredo Verzosa y Florentín was born in Vigan, Ilocos Sur to Don Alejandro Verzosa and Doña Micaela Florentín of the Gremio de Mestizos ("Mestizo Guild") of Vigan. Alfredo was the second of seven children. The Verzosa family were devout Catholics and financial patrons of the Cathedral Church.

Verzosa was raised religiously and expressed an early interest in the priesthood. After elementary school, he enrolled at the Conciliar Seminary of Nueva Segovia, staying for three years before leaving. He then transferred to the Colegio de san Juan de Letrán in Manila, where he finished his Segunda Enseñanza ("secondary education") and obtained his Bachelor of Arts. After consulting a Dominican Friar, he returned to the seminary.

== Theological studies ==
Verzosa studied theology at the University of Santo Tomas in Manila. As a seminarian, he received his Tonsure and the Four Minor Orders in Manila. This period coincided with the Philippine Revolution and the subsequent Philippine-American War, causing upheaval in both civil and ecclesiastical life. The Ilocano priest Gregorio Aglipay served as Military Chaplain for Emilio Aguinaldo's Revolutionary Government, and was later excommunicated for Usurpation of Jurisdiction after attempting to secure control of the Nueva Segovia diocese. He subsequently helped establish the Philippine Independent Church, causing many priests and parishioners in Nueva Segovia to leave the Catholic Church. The arrival of Bishop Dennis Dougherty in 1903 brought a renewed focus on ordaining new priests for the diocese.

== Priestly ordination ==
Verzosa was ordained a priest by Dougherty in 1904 before completing his theological studies. His first assignment was at the Vigan Cathedral, followed by the Parish of Santa. He then became assistant priest to Eulogio Alcid in the Parish of Bantay. Alcid is known for convening an assembly of Ilocos Sur priests who rejected foreign bishops. While an assistant priest in Bantay, Verzosa resided in the Visita de san Ildefonso preparing for its establishment as a parish in 1906. He became Parish Priest of Bantay in 1907, working to bring people back to the Catholicism. During his missionary work, he faced opposition, including a reported incident where a spear thrown by a minister of another sect killed his horse. He also served as a missionary in Ilocos Norte, where he was struck by a stone thrown by a young Aglipayan while preaching in Batac in 1915.

== Bishop of Lipa ==
Styles of Alfredo F. Verzosa
- Reference style: The Most Reverend
- Spoken style: Your Excellency
- Religious style: Bishop
- Posthumous style: Servant of God

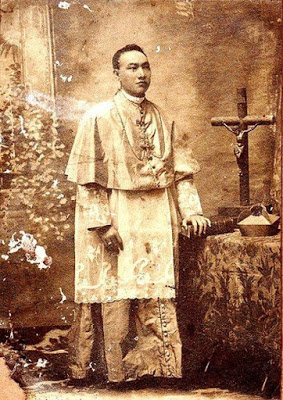
Photograph of Bishop Alfredo F. Verzosa

In 1916, at age 39, Verzosa was appointed the first Filipino Bishop of Lipa, covering the Southern Tagalog Provinces. He succeeded Giuseppe Petrelli, who became the Apostolic Delegate to the Philippines. Verzosa's episcopal ordination took place at the Cathedral of San Sebastián on January 20, 1917, with Archbishop Petrelli presiding.

Drawing on his experience in Nueva Segovia, Verzosa prioritized catechetics in Lipa, establishing centers and training local catechists. This led to the founding of the Religiosas de María de la Enseñanza Cristiana (later renamed the Misioneras Catequistas del Sagrado Corazón) in 1923. He also introduced various religious congregations to the diocese, including the Carmelites and the Pauline Fathers and Sisters, and oversaw the construction of schools, seminaries, catechetical centers, and convents.

== Apostolic administrator of Nueva Segovia ==
Following Peter Joseph Hurth's resignation as Bishop of Nueva Segovia, Verzosa became the diocese's Apostolic Administrator. In January 1926, a rebellion among native priests in Pangasinan, led by Hurth's suspended Vicar General, Benigno Jimenez, created a crisis.

=== Pangasinan crisis ===
Verzosa assumed leadership of Nueva Segovia in February 1926 and addressed the Pangasinan crisis through personal visits, discussions with clergy, and retreats. His efforts helped resolve the situation. By the end of his term in 1927, he proposed establishing a new diocese in Pangasinan for closer pastoral care, with its seat in Lingayen. This led to the creation of the Diocese of Lingayen in 1928.

=== Divine Word Fathers ===
Also in 1926, Verzosa arranged for the Divine Word Fathers (SVD) to take over the Vigan Seminary after the Jesuits declined to renew their contract. He also invited the Holy Spirit Sisters to manage the Laoag Catholic School in Ilocos Norte that same year. Although offered the position of Bishop of Nueva Segovia, Verzosa declined, preferring to continue his work in Lipa. He served as Apostolic Administrator until Santiago Sancho's arrival in 1927.

== Witnessing ==
Verzosa's reputation for piety led to his appointment as Chairman of Catholic Action for the Philippines and Permanent Secretary of the Philippine Bishops. He was frequently chosen as co-consecrator for new bishops. He was known for his financial support of priests from poor parishes and his dedication to helping students finish their studies. He established multiple Catholic Schools and seminaries in his diocese. He lived simply, prioritizing diocesan funds for building churches, convents, monasteries, and schools rather than personal comforts. The outbreak of World War II disrupted plans for his Silver Jubilee as bishop.

== World War II ==
During World War II, Verzosa reportedly helped women who were forced into prostitution by the Japanese military. He led people to safety during the bombing of Lipa and later helped with the city's post-war recovery.

=== Auxiliary bishop Alfredo Obviar ===
In 1944, Verzosa requested assistance from the Holy See, leading to the appointment of his Vicar General, Alfredo Obviar, as his Auxiliary Bishop. Obviar, ordained by Verzosa in 1919, shared Verzosa's passion for catechetics and played a key role in the founding of the Missionary Catechists of the Sacred Heart. After the war, Verzosa rebuilt the diocese with the help of Obviar, utilizing his own inheritance.

== Carmel of Lipa ==
In 1946, Verzosa granted the Carmelite nuns land for a monastery. This location later became associated with an alleged Marian apparition in 1948; Verzosa allowed public veneration of the image associated with the apparition, but the Vatican later ruled that this was not a supernatural event.

== Lipa under apostolic administration ==
Due to declining health, Verzosa was relieved of his duties as Ordinary of Lipa in 1949, with the diocese placed under Apostolic Administration led by Bishop Rufino Santos. He resigned as bishop of Lipa in 1951. He retained the titular bishop of Capsa.

== Retirement ==
Verzosa retired to Vigan where he faced challenges including depression and poverty, but remained devoted to prayer.

== Death ==
Verzosa died on June 27, 1954, and was buried in Vigan. Following his death, there were claims of his sanctity, with tributes appearing in publications such as the Boletín Eclesiástico de Filipinas.

== Cause of beatification and canonization ==
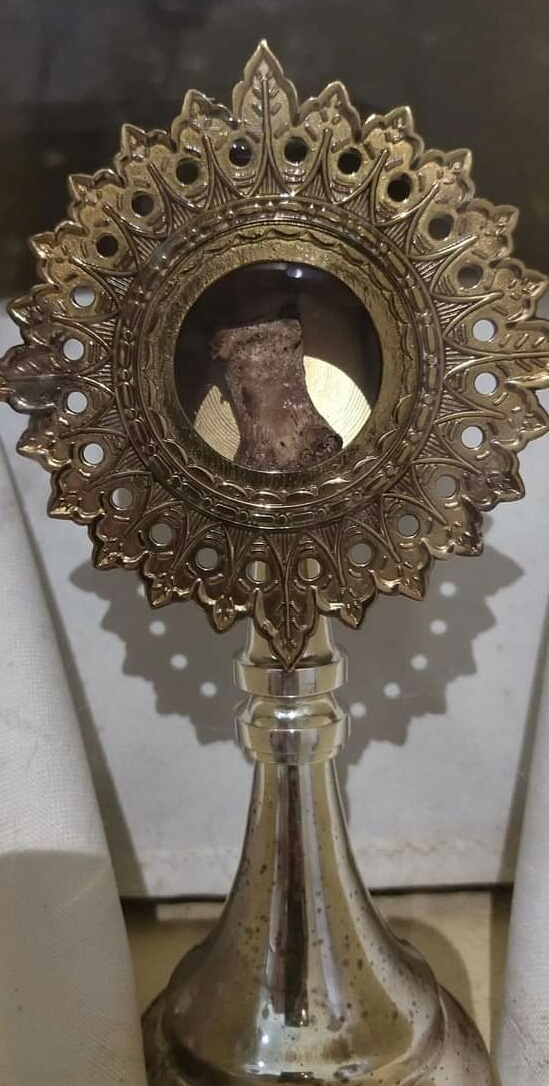
Ex ossibus relic of the Servant of God Alfredo F. Verzosa

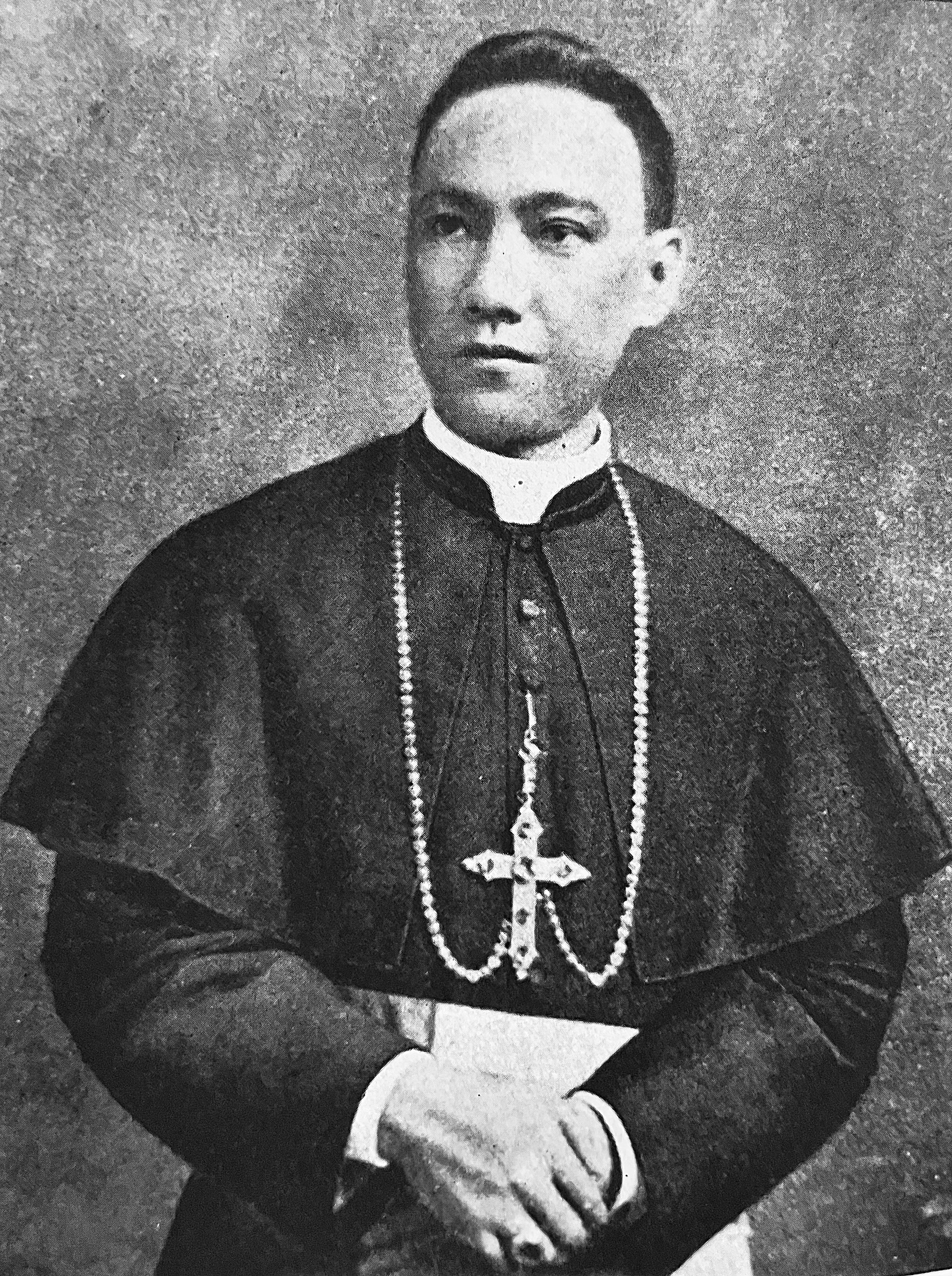
Servant of God Alfredo Verzosa y Florentín

The Archdiocese of Nueva Segovia officially opened his cause for beatification on January 11, 2013. The Vatican granted the nihil obstat on November 17, 2014. The Diocesan Inquiry concluded on April 2, 2016, and the Congregation for the Causes of Saints issued the “decree of validity” on June 2, 2017. The positio is currently being prepared.

== See also ==
- List of Filipinos venerated in the Catholic Church
