= Quizon =

Quizon is a Filipino surname. There are notable Filipino people with this surname including the following:

- Daniel Quizon (born 2004), Filipino chess grandmaster
- Epy Quizon (born 1973), Filipino actor and TV host
- Eric Quizon (born 1967), Filipino actor, director, producer, writer, and comedian
- Freddie Quizon (1956–2005), Filipino actor
- Rodolfo Vera Quizon Sr. (1928–2012), Filipino actor and comedian, better known by his stage name Dolphy
- Rolly Quizon (born 1958), Filipino actor
- Salvador Q. Quizon (1924–2016), Filipino Roman Catholic bishop
- Vandolph Quizon (born 1984), Filipino actor and comedian
- Zia Quizon (born 1991), Filipino singer-songwriter and recording artist
