= Archdiocese of Lipa =

Roman Catholic archdiocese in the Philippines

Archdiocese of Lipa Archidioecesis Lipensis: Arkidiyosesis ng Lipa; Arquidiócesis de Lipa

Catholic
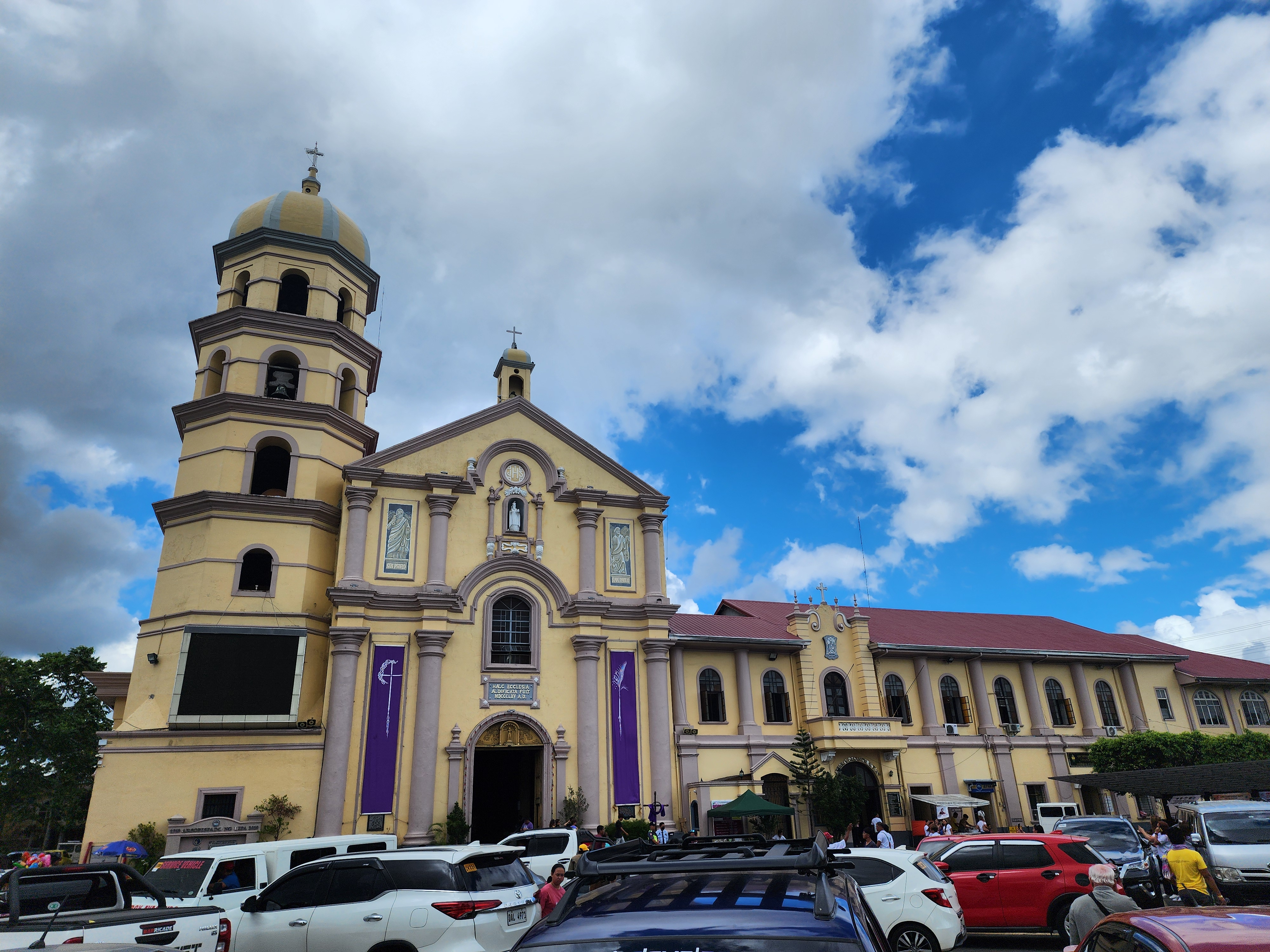
- Lipa Cathedral

- Coat of arms

Location
- Country: Philippines
- Territory: Batangas
- Ecclesiastical province: Lipa
- Residence: Archbishop's Residence, Lipa, Batangas
- Metropolitan: Lipa
- Deaneries: 14 (List): Saint Francis Xavier; Immaculate Conception; Saint Roche; Our Lady of Caysasay; Saint Francis of Paola; Holy Cross; Santo Niño; Saint Michael the Archangel; Our Lady of the Rosary; Saint Joseph the Patriarch; Saint Vincent Ferrer; Saint Sebastian; Saint John the Evangelist; Saint William the Hermit
- Coordinates: 13.9408°N 121.1630°E

Statistics
- Area: 3,165 km^{2} (1,222 sq mi)
- Population: Total; Catholics: (as of 2021); 3,122,229; 3,041,821 (97.4%)
- Parishes: 65

Information
- Denomination: Catholic
- Sui iuris church: Latin Church
- Rite: Roman Rite
- Established: April 10, 1910; 116 years ago (Diocese); June 20, 1972; 54 years ago (Archdiocese)
- Cathedral: Metropolitan Cathedral of St. Sebastian
- Patron saint: Joseph the Patriarch (Primary); Our Lady of Caysasay (Titular Queen); Sebastian (Lipa City)
- Secular priests: 123

Current leadership
- Pope: Leo XIV
- Metropolitan Archbishop: Gilbert Garcera
- Suffragans: Edwin Panergo (Boac); Moises Cuevas (Calapan); Euginius Cañete (Gumaca); Mel Rey Uy (Lucena); Dave Capucao (Infanta)
- Vicar General: Ruben Dimaculangan
- Judicial Vicar: Wilfredo Rosales
- Bishops emeritus: Ramon Arguelles

Map
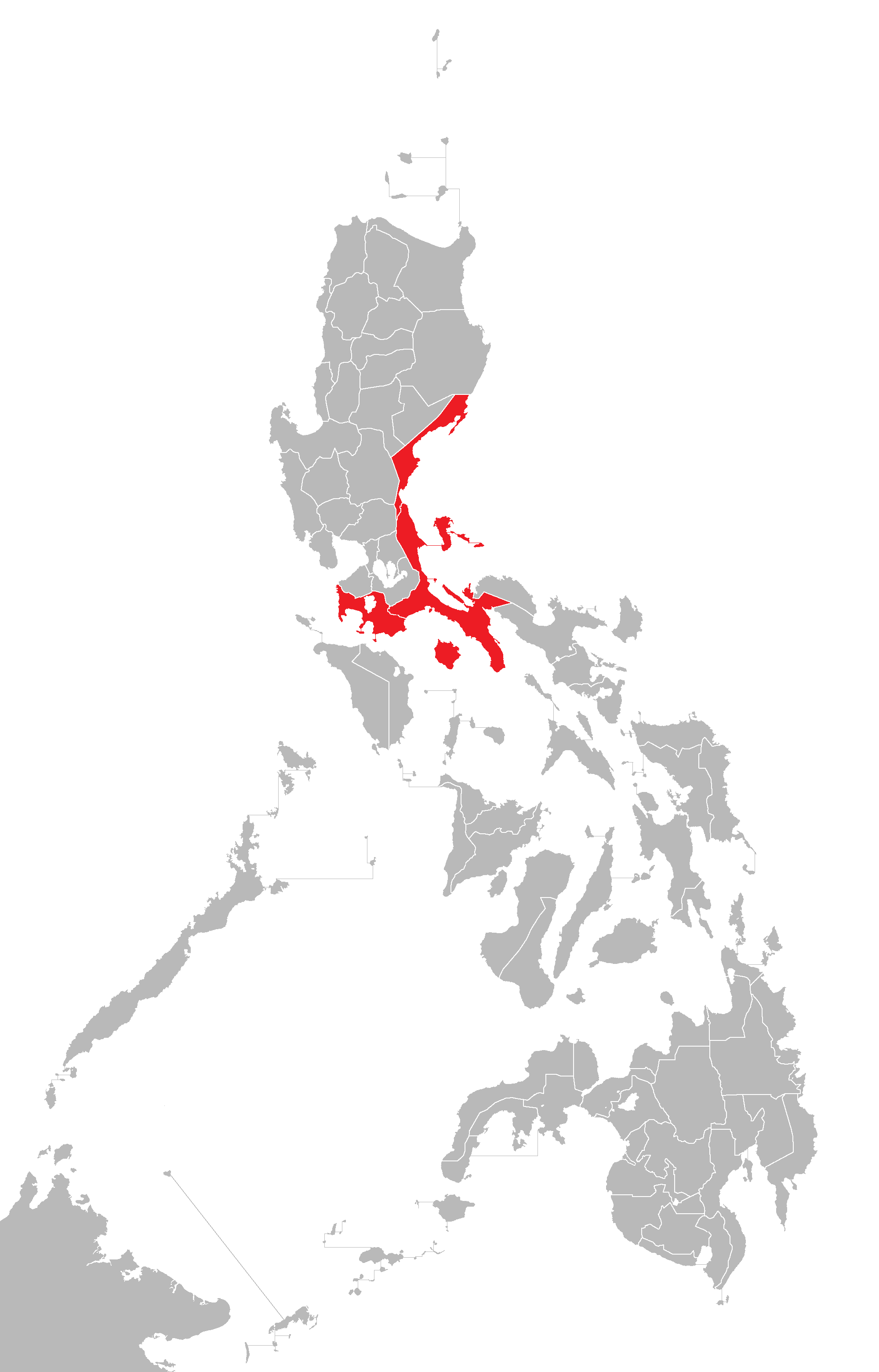
- Jurisdiction of the metropolitan see within the Philippines

The Archdiocese of Lipa (Latin: Archidioecesis Lipensis; Filipino: Arkidiyosesis ng Lipa; Spanish: Arquidiócesis de Lipa) is a Latin Church ecclesiastical territory or archdiocese of the Catholic Church in the Philippines comprising the civil province of Batangas. Its cathedral is the Metropolitan Cathedral of St. Sebastian located in Lipa, Batangas. First created on April 10, 1910 from the Archdiocese of Manila, the diocese was elevated into its present status on June 20, 1972. Today, the Archdiocese of Lipa's ecclesiastical province covers Batangas and the suffragan territories in the civil provinces of Quezon, Marinduque, Oriental Mindoro, and Aurora. The archdiocese itself is divided into 14 vicariates forane, further comprising a total of 65 parishes.

In addition, the Archdiocese of Lipa also serves as the de facto overseer of the Apostolic Vicariate of San Jose in Occidental Mindoro, all the exempt dioceses of the Holy See (with the vicariate under the jurisdiction of the Dicastery for Evangelization).

== History ==
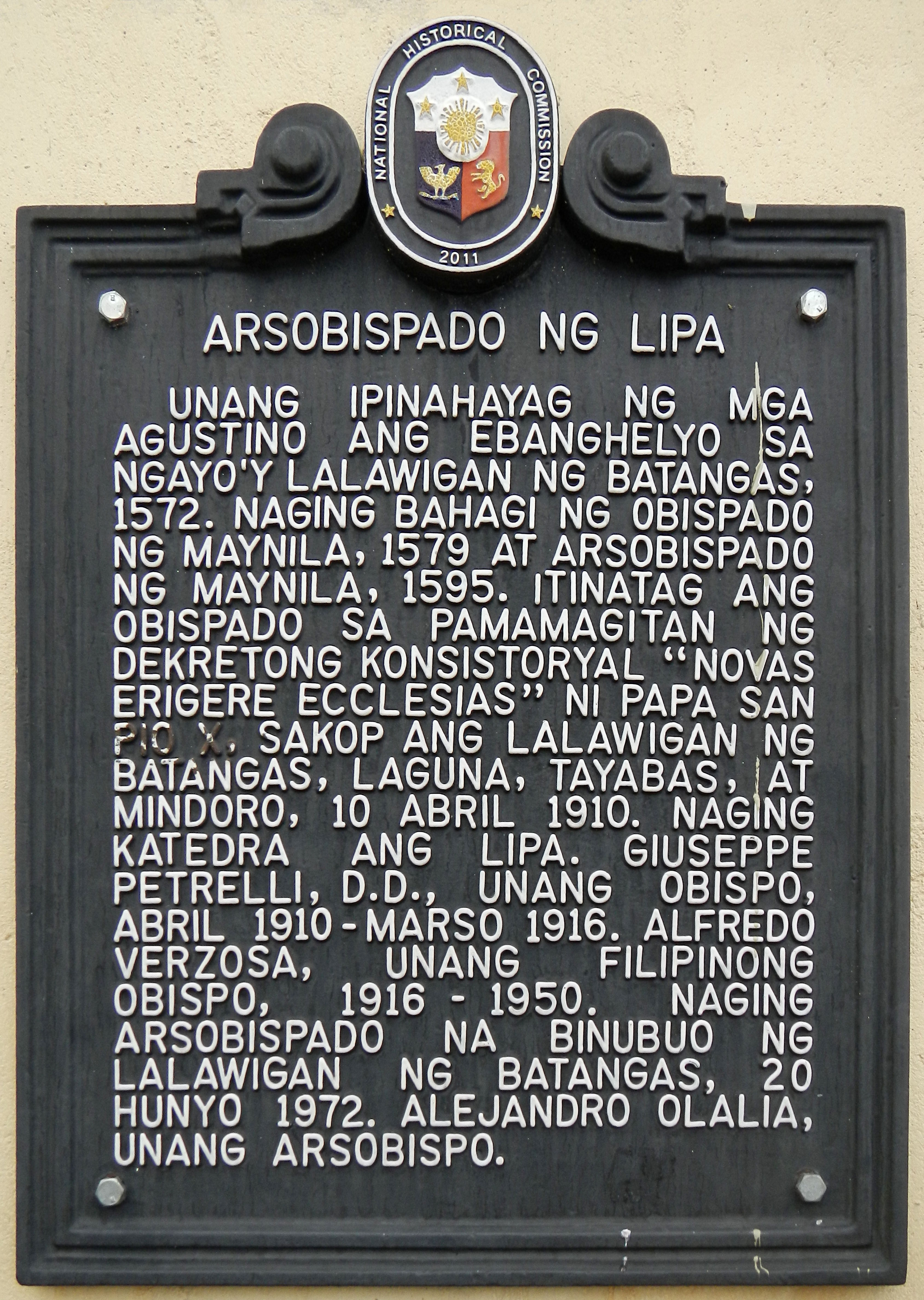
Historical marker installed at the cathedral by the National Historical Commission of the Philippines in 2011 commemorating the diocese

=== Creation as a diocese ===
Former coat of arms of then-Diocese of Lipa (as illustrated in Philippine Studies)

The Diocese of Lipa was created on April 10, 1910, separating it from that of Manila under the supervision of Pope Pius X and with Giuseppe Petrelli as its first bishop. The diocese then covered the provinces of Batangas, Laguna, Tayabas (now Quezon, Marinduque, and Aurora), and Mindoro (now Occidental Mindoro and Oriental Mindoro). There were initially very few priests for the large diocese.

Petrelli invited different Roman Catholic religious institutes to come to his diocese and help minister to the spiritual needs of the faithful. He also conceived the building of a seminary in the diocese. In June 1914 a diocesan seminary was built in Bauan, which was later transferred to San Pablo in Laguna. This initiative of the first bishop was continued by the next bishop, Alfredo Verzosa, the diocese's first Filipino bishop, who served a long term from 1916 to 1950. He invited priests from the Vincentian Fathers to help in the administration of the new seminary.

On July 2, 1936, Mindoro Island was separated and came under the jurisdiction of the Apostolic Prefecture of Mindoro, making it the first territorial re-organization of the archdiocese. On March 28, 1950, Lucena became a diocese of its own covering the southern portion of Quezon and Marinduque. About a month later on April 25, the Prelature of Infanta was created, comprising the remaining part of Quezon, including the Polillo Islands and what is now the province of Aurora.

In 1950, Rufino Santos took over the diocese. Described as a financial administrator of great acumen, he applied for bank loans to help construct some buildings. He continued the construction work of the Lipa Cathedral and built a major seminary beside it.

The Roman Catholic Diocese of San Pablo was separated on November 28, 1966, seated in the city of San Pablo and becoming a suffragan of Manila. This left the Diocese of Lipa covering only the province of Batangas.

=== Elevation into an archdiocese ===
With the departure of Santos for the Archdiocese of Manila came a young bishop, Alejandro Ayson Olalia, who stayed with the diocese from 1953 to 1973. It was during his term that the Diocese of Lipa, on June 20, 1972, became the country's tenth archdiocese and ecclesiastical province by order of Pope Paul VI of the papal bull Qui Sumi Nominis. This same order elevated Olalia to the rank of archbishop on August 15, 1972.

Olalia died in 1973 and was replaced by Bishop Ricardo J. Vidal who stayed with the diocese until 1981. During his incumbency Vidal organized the Pastoral Council, and initiated the construction of the Lipa Archdiocesan Formation Center.

Vidal was replaced in 1981 for Cebu's new prelate by his successor Bishop Mariano Garces Gaviola, who stayed with the diocese from 1981 to 1993. He was at the helm of the archdiocese as it celebrated its 75th anniversary. On March 19, 1993, the reins of the archdiocese were again transferred, this time to Bishop Gaudencio Rosales, a native of Batangas City. He was ordained priest in Lipa in 1958, became auxiliary bishop of Manila in 1974, served as bishop in the Diocese of Malaybalay in 1982, and was elected archbishop of Lipa on December 30, 1992. Gaudencio Rosales founded the Aral Batangueño and the small giving foundation which is Pondong Batangan.

With the resignation of Cardinal Jaime Sin in 2003, Rosales was chosen by Pope John Paul II to be the Manila's new prelate, leaving the See of Lipa under the apostolic administration of its Auxiliary Bishop Jose Salazar (d. May 30, 2004). On May 14, 2004, Pope John Paul II appointed Bishop Ramon Arguelles of the Military Ordinariate of the Philippines, another native of Batangas City, as the fifth archbishop of Lipa.

In his 13 years in office, Arguelles canonically erected new parishes in Lipa, Lemery, Taysan, Tanauan and Batangas City, and organized Marian events such as the annual Taal Lake Marian Regatta and National Days of Prayer in Lipa, both held every September. He is a strong opponent of the passage of RH Law, the operation of motorist lodges in the province, the possible mining activities in the municipality of Lobo, and the construction of a coal-fired power plant in Batangas City. He also led the establishment of a local election watchdog separate from the church-based PPCRV.

On April 10, 2010, the Archdiocese of Lipa celebrated the 100th anniversary of its elevation as a diocese by launching the coffee table book A Century of Faith: The Local Church of Lipa. The event was held at the historic Basilica of St. Martin of Tours in Taal, Batangas.

Pope Francis accepted the resignation of Arguelles on February 2, 2017, and then appointed Bishop Gilbert Garcera, of Daet in Camarines Norte, as its sixth archbishop and eighth local ordinary.

== Coat of arms ==
The cross and arrows are symbols of Saint Sebastian the Martyr, patron of the cathedral. The two white long-stemmed lilies are symbols of Saint Joseph, head of the Holy Family, to whom the faithful of the diocese are ardently devoted. The bottom of the shield shows the lake and volcano of Taal in Batangas.

== Organization ==
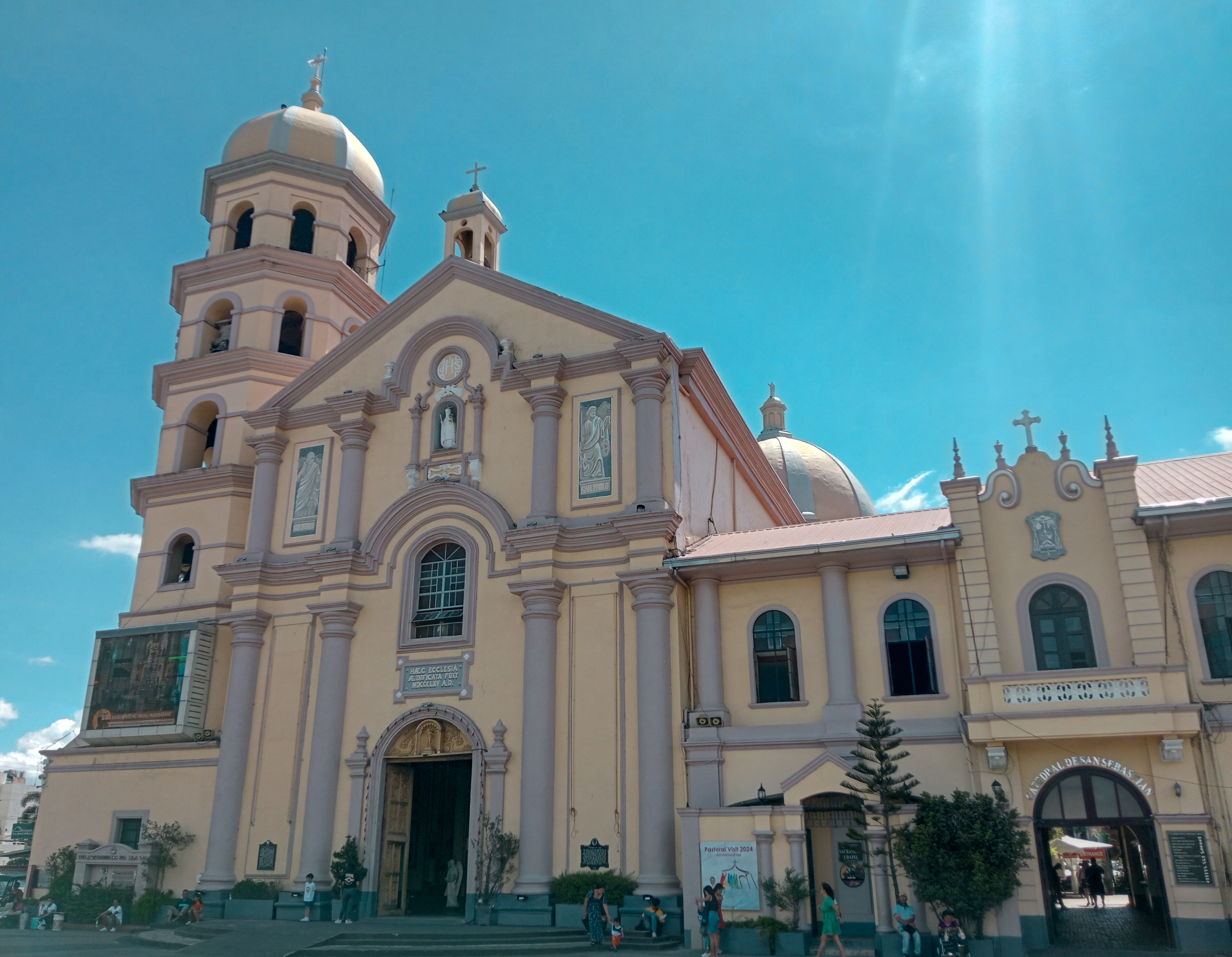
Metropolipan Cathedral of Saint Sebastian, seat of the Roman Catholic Archdiocese of Lipa

The archdiocese has jurisdiction over the Catholic faithful in the province of Batangas. The province's land area is 3,165 square kilometers (1,222 sq mi) and the population as of the 1994 census is 1,668,480, of whom 99.5 per cent are Catholics. The archdiocese also has general supervision over the suffragan dioceses and territorial prelatures for the provinces of Quezon Marinduque and Oriental Mindoro.

The archdiocese is divided into 14 vicariates, each headed by a vicar forane. Except for the parishes in the 4th district of Batangas (excluding Taysan) which are run by the Oblates of St. Joseph, all other parishes are run by the diocesan clergy. There are 64 parishes in all, served by 291 priests. 123 of them diocesan. There are 331 religious brothers and 491 religious sisters. There are 23 Catholic schools within the archdiocese, two high school seminaries, and three college seminaries. Two pastoral centers are maintained.

== Ordinaries ==
=== Archbishops ===
The seat of the archbishop is in the Metropolitan Cathedral of St. Sebastian. The archbishop oversees the suffragan dioceses of Boac, Calapan, Gumaca, Lucena, Prelature of Infanta, and also serves as de facto overseer of the apostolic vicariate of San Jose.

Bishop		Period in office	Notes	Coat of arms
Bishops of Lipa (April 10, 1910 – June 20, 1972)
1	José Petrelli	April 12, 1910 – March 30, 1915 (4 years, 352 days)	Appointed as the fifth apostolic delegate to the Philippines	
2	Alfredo Florentin Versoza	September 6, 1916 – February 25, 1951 (34 years, 172 days)	Retired from office	
3	Alejandro Ayson Olalia	December 28, 1953 – June 20, 1972 (18 years, 175 days)	Later elevated to archbishop	
Archbishops of Lipa (June 20, 1972 – present)
1	Alejandro Ayson Olalia	June 20, 1972 – January 2, 1973 (196 days)	Died in office	
2	Ricardo Jamin Vidal	August 22, 1973 – April 13, 1981 (7 years, 234 days)	Later appointed archbishop of Cebu, and cardinal	
3	Mariano Garces Gaviola	April 13, 1981 – December 13, 1992 (11 years, 244 days)	Retired from office	
4	Gaudencio Borbon Rosales	March 19, 1993 – November 21, 2003 (10 years, 247 days)	Later appointed archbishop of Manila, and cardinal	
5	Ramon Cabrera Arguelles	July 16, 2004 – April 21, 2017 (12 years, 279 days)	Retired from office	
6	Gilbert Armea Garcera	April 21, 2017 – present (9 years, 215 days)	President of the Catholic Bishops' Conference of the Philippines	

=== Auxiliary bishops ===
No.	Picture	Name	Period in office	Titular see	Notes
1		Ven. Alfredo Maria Aranda Obviar	March 11, 1944 – November 4, 1950	Linoë	First auxiliary bishop, later appointed bishop of Lucena
2		Salvador Quizon Quizon	June 9, 1971 – April 6, 2002	Feradi Minus	Retired
3		Buenaventura Malayo Famadico	April 6, 2002 – June 11, 2003	Urusi	Appointed bishop of Gumaca
4		Jose Paala Salazar	June 11, 2003 – May 30, 2004	Hippo Diarrhytus	Died in office

=== Priests of the diocese/archdiocese who became bishops ===
- + Alfredo Ma. Obviar, 1st auxiliary bishop of Lipa and 1st bishop of the Diocese of Lucena (1950–1976)
- Gaudencio Cardinal Rosales, 31st metropolitan archbishop of the Archdiocese of Manila (2003–2011)
- + Godofredo Pedernal, 2nd bishop of the Diocese of Borongan (1968–1976); ordained as a priest of the Diocese of Lipa before the erection of the Diocese of Lucena
- + Salvador Quizon, auxiliary bishop of Lipa (1979–2002)
- Reynaldo Evangelista, 5th bishop of the Diocese of Imus (2013–present)
- Marcelino Antonio Maralit, 5th bishop of the Diocese of San Pablo (2024–present)

== Suffragan dioceses, prelature, and bishops ==
Diocese	Image	Bishop	Period in office	Coat of arms
Boac (Marinduque)		Edwin O. Panergo	December 2, 2025 – present (355 days)	
Calapan (Oriental Mindoro)		Moises M. Cuevas	August 7, 2026 – present (107 days)	
Gumaca (Southern Quezon)		Euginius L. Cañete, M.J.	January 4, 2025 – present (1 year, 322 days)	
Lucena (Central Quezon)		Mel Rey M. Uy	November 8, 2017 – present (9 years, 14 days)	
Infanta (Northern Quezon, Aurora)		Dave Dean Capucao	September 5, 2025 – present (1 year, 78 days)	

== Vision ==
On August 18, 1995 after much review, and meetings presided over by Archbishop Gaudencio Rosales himself, the archdiocese's vision was conceived:

A people of God called by the Father in Jesus Christ to be communities of totally developed human persons in the world, witnessing to the Kingdom of God by living the Paschal Mystery in the power of the Holy Spirit.

== See also ==
- Catholic Church in the Philippines
