= Archdiocesan Shrine of Our Lady of Caysasay =

Caysasay Shrine
- Archdiocesan Shrine of Our Lady of Caysasay
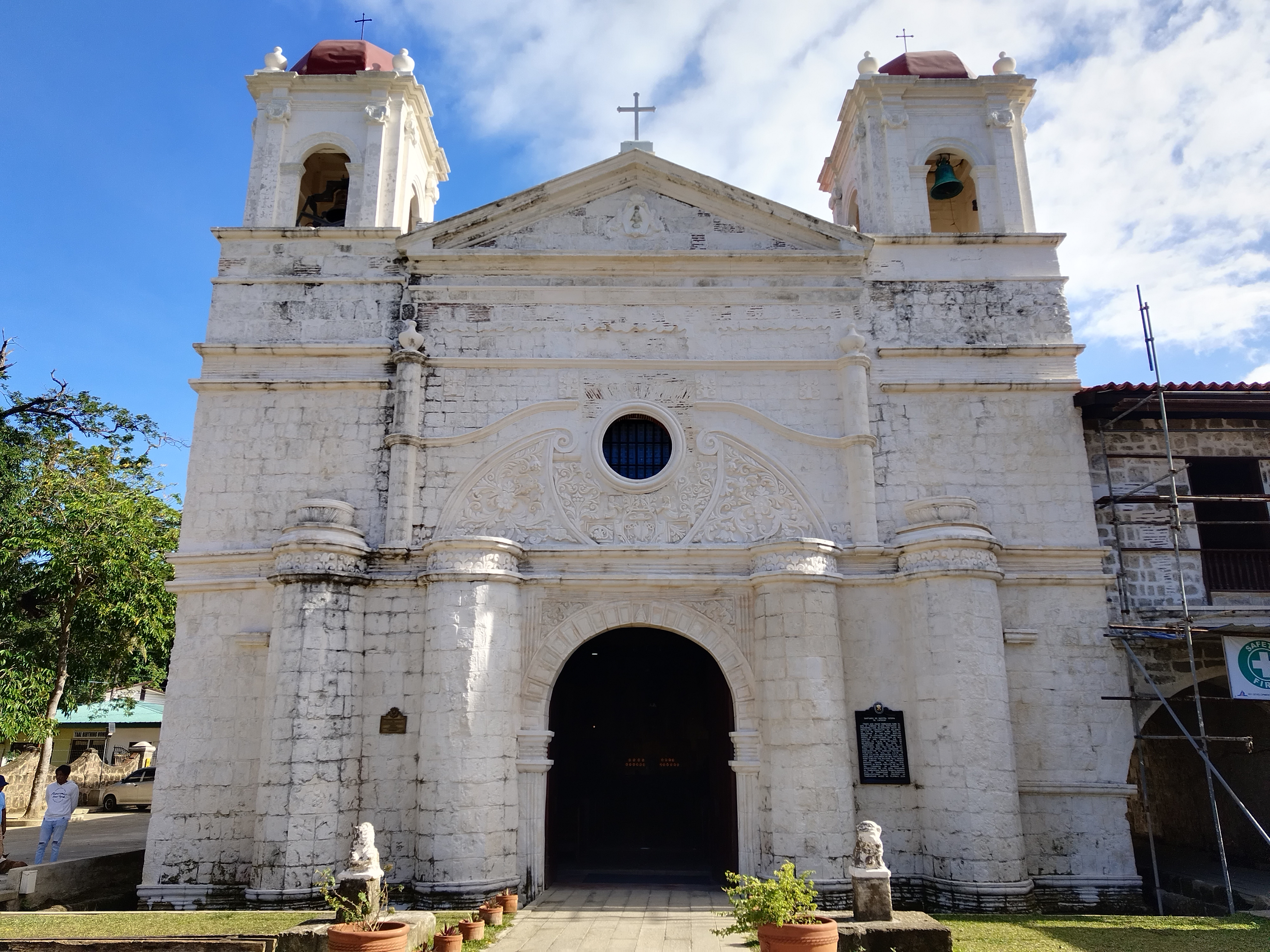
- Restored façade in Jan 2025

- Location in Luzon Location in the Philippines
- 13°52′50.0″N 120°55′29.4″E
- Location: Taal, Batangas
- Country: Philippines
- Denomination: Roman Catholic

History
- Status: Archdiocesan Shrine
- Dedication: Our Lady of Caysasay
- Dedicated: June 20, 2024; 2 years ago

Architecture
- Functional status: Active
- Heritage designation: National Cultural Treasure; National Historical Landmark
- Architectural type: Chapel
- Groundbreaking: 1639; 387 years ago
- Completed: 1640; 386 years ago

Specifications
- Length: 50 meters (160 ft)
- Width: 10 meters (33 ft)
- Materials: Coral, bricks and wood

Administration
- Archdiocese: Lipa
- Deanery: Saint John the Evangelist
- Parish: Saint Martin of Tours

National Historical Landmarks
- Region: Calabarzon
- Marker Date: June 20, 2024

National Cultural Treasures
- Designated: March 2020
- Region: Calabarzon
- Marker Date: June 20, 2024

The Archdiocesan Shrine of Our Lady of Caysasay (Spanish: Santuario Arquidiocesano de Nuestra Señora de Caysasay) is a coral-hewn Roman Catholic chapel in Barrio Caysasay in Taal, Batangas, belonging to the Archdiocese of Lipa in the Philippines. It was built in 1639 by Fr. Alonso Rodriguez to replace a temporary structure built in 1611. The church is home to Our Lady of Caysasay whose feast day is celebrated every December 8.

== History ==
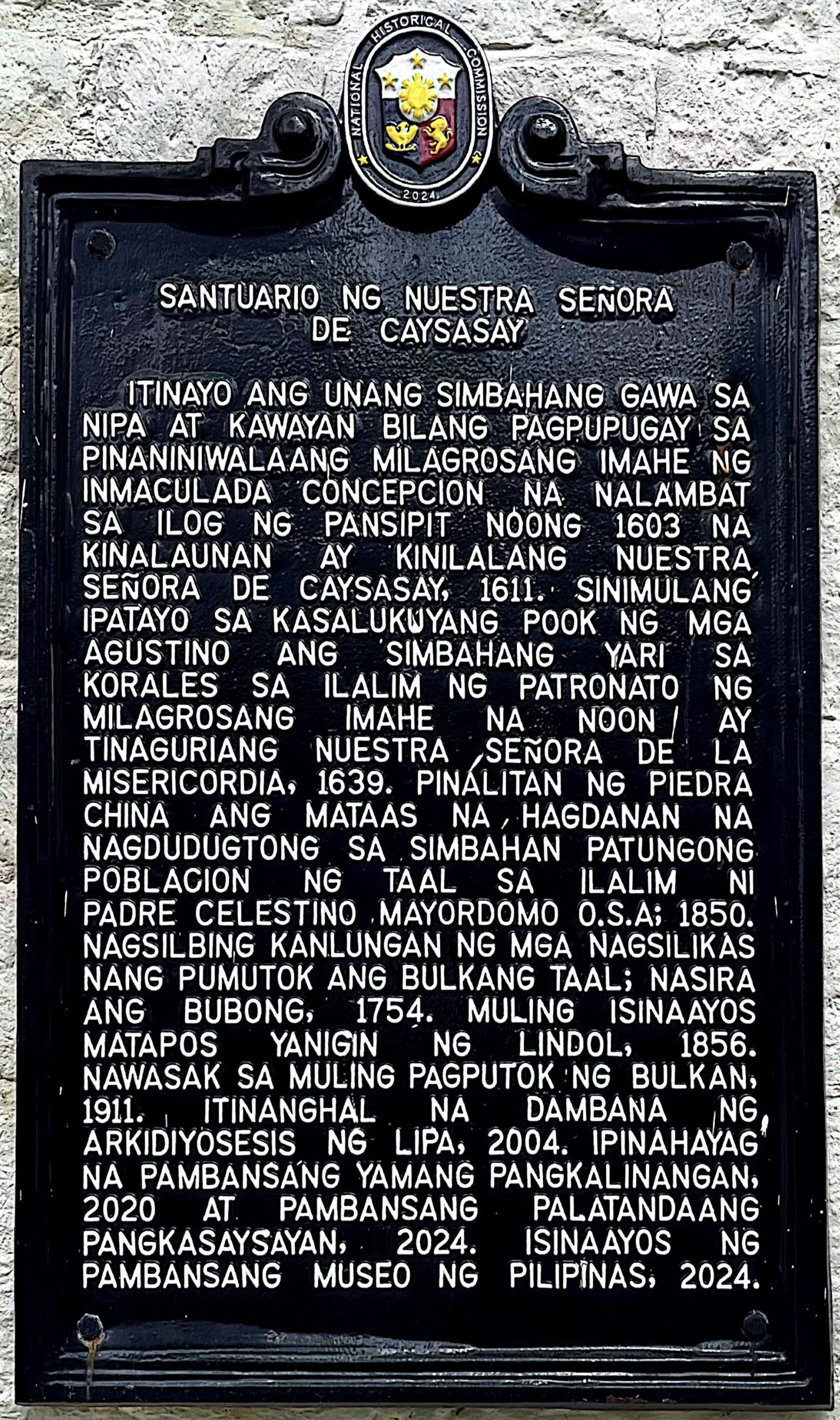
NHC marker unveiled on June 20, 2024.

The church was first built around 1611 by the Chinese and was made of light materials. This shrine was located near the river where image was usually found, An arch made of coral stone with a bas relief of the Virgin of Caysasay was built later on. On February 24, 1620, Augustinians issued an order to construct a church in Caysasay, as a visita of Taal. It has been verified through serious investigation that the Most Holy Virgin has appeared there and that it be given with the title Nuestra Señora de la Misericordia.

In 1639, a new church made out of coral stone was built under the direction of Fr. Alonso Rodriguez, minister of Taal. The church was to serve as the perpetual shrine of the Virgin and to replace the temporary structure set up in 1611. The Sanctuary measures 50 metres (160 ft) long and 10 metres (33 ft) wide. Behind the main altar lies the sacristy and a stairwell that leads to the room of the Virgin where devotees could venerate. Adjacent to the church is a convent made of hew stone said to have been built also by Chinese workers. The roof of the church was partly destroyed in 1754 by boulders and ash from the Taal Volcano, but was quickly repaired and served as the temporary church of Taal, while the latter was under repair.

During the earthquake of December 24, 1852, the walls of the church cracked and the towers fell. Fr. Celestino Mayordomo improvised a large makeshift shelter at the town plaza where the image of the Virgin of Caysasay was enshrined temporarily. Fr, Mayordomo also started the reconstruction work which was completed in 1856. The twin towers rose again, the interior was newly painted and the stone fence was completed. The image was again enthroned in her home Sanctuary.

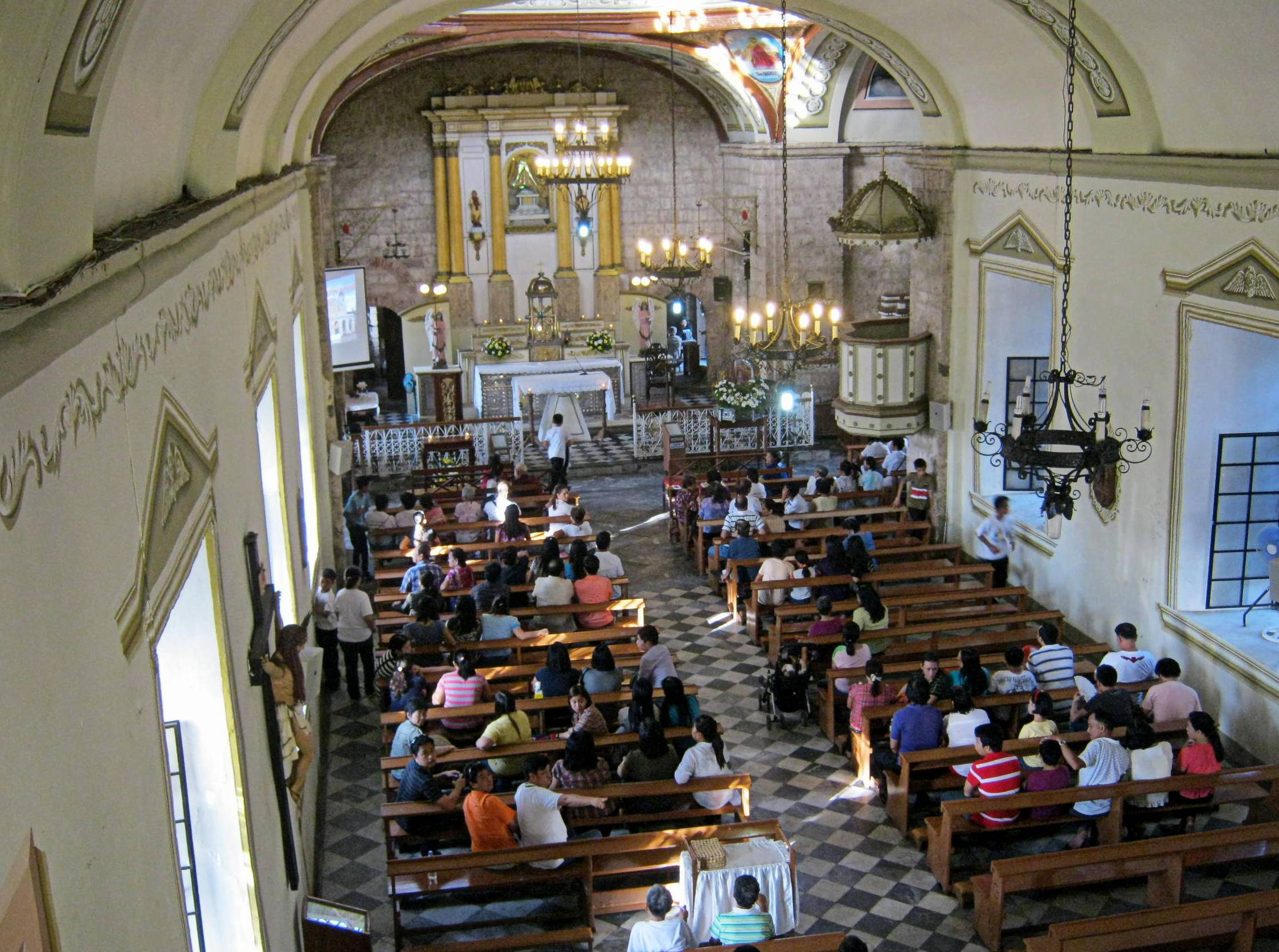
Church interior in 2012

The sanctuary was damaged again by tremors in 1867. Fr. Marcos Anton repaired the minor damages, installed a new altar and a presbytery floor and constructed an iron balustrade around it. The interior was decorated under the direction of Italian decorator Cesar Alberoni. In 1880, Fr. Agapito Aparicio installed an organ bought from the famous organist Don Doroteo Otorelin of Palencia, Spain. The earthquake of 1880 did not cause serious damage to the sanctuary.

The church has been renovated ever since, A coat of stucco cement was applied to the front wall and to the towers. The stone and brick wall was scrape clean to reveal its original color. The former convent was converted on May 20, 1962 into an orphanage called Children's Home managed by the Sister Oblates of the Holy Spirit upon the request of Cardinal Rufino Santos.

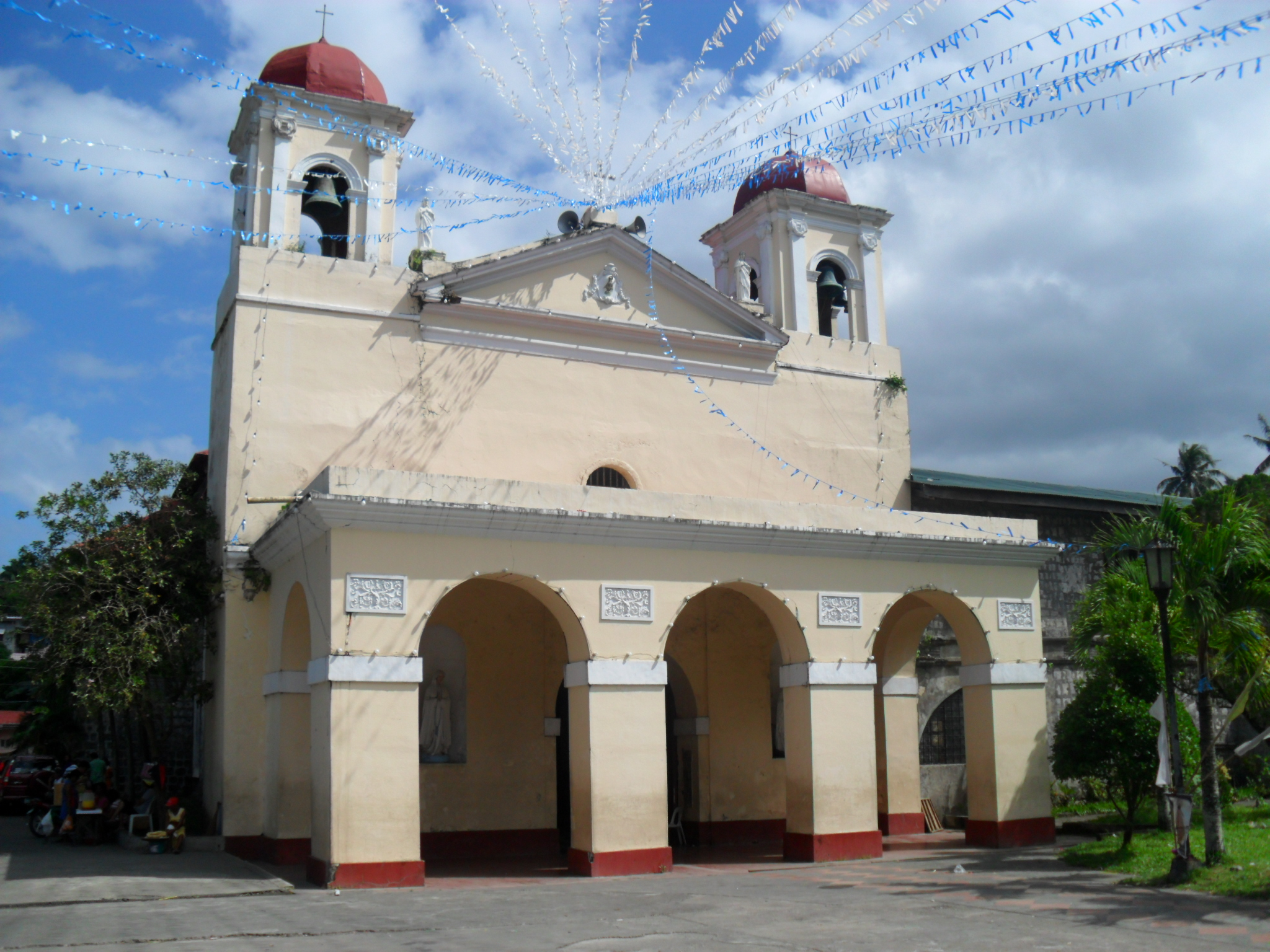
The church in 2011, prior to restoration works started in 2021

By January 2020, the façade sustained fissures caused by the eruption of Taal Volcano and persistent earthquakes that occurred in the past years. Although the interior remained intact, it temporarily closed. The National Museum of the Philippines initiated the restoration of the shrine in January 2021 at a cost of ₱15 million. A temporary chapel was built during the restoration. The church officially reopened on June 20, 2024, after a four-year closure. The re-dedication rites were presided by the apostolic nuncio to the Philippines, Charles John Brown, and the Archbishop of Lipa, Gilbert Garcera. The church was also officially designated as a National Cultural Treasure and a National Historical Landmark during the ceremony.

== San Lorenzo Ruiz Steps ==
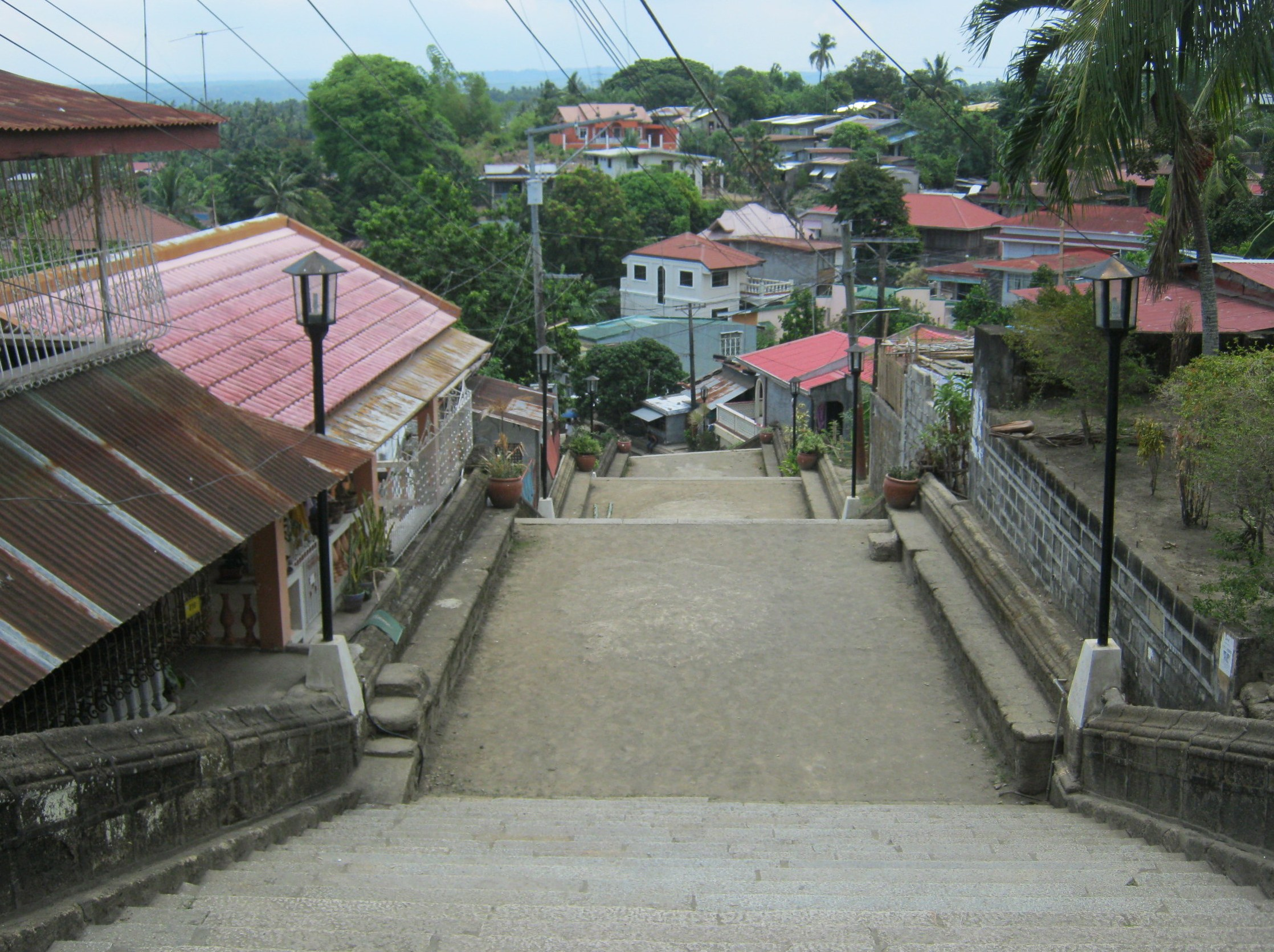
San Lorenzo Ruiz Steps

The hagdan-hagdan is a 125 granite steps from the Caysasay Church which leads up to the center of town. Originally, the steps were made of adobe stone, but these were later replaced with granite or batong song-song in the year 1850 by Fr. Celestino Mayordomo. It is now dedicated to the memory of San Lorenzo Ruiz.

== Sta. Lucia Wells ==
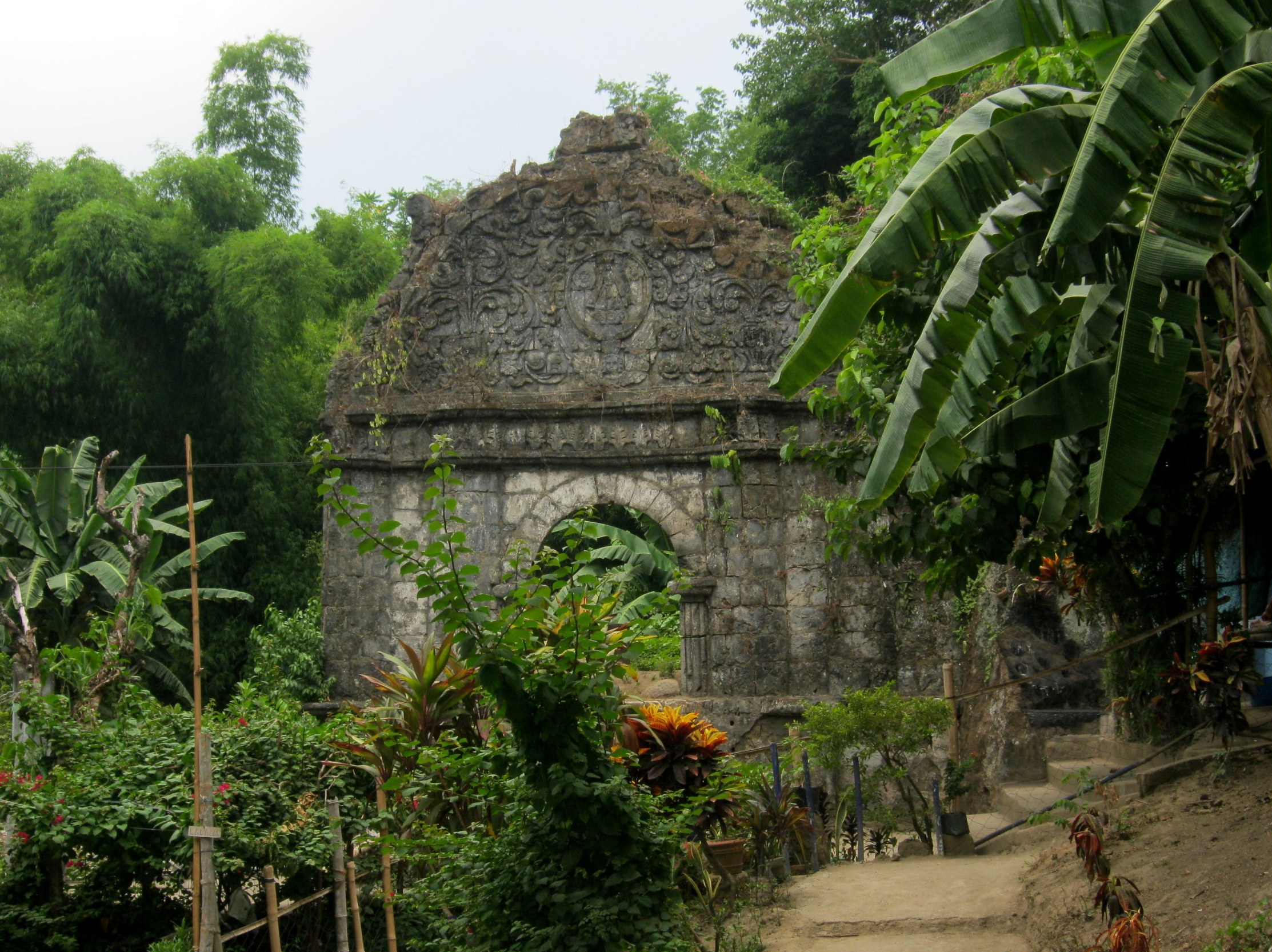
Sta. Lucia Wells

The spring-fed well was where two women saw the reflection of the Virgin of Caysasay, is now known as the Miraculous Well of Sta. Lucia. Since its discovery, many have attested that the spring water has miraculous healing and therapeutic powers. The spot where the well which reflected the image of Our Lady is marked by a coral stone arch with a bas relief image of the Virgin on its façade. It was built in early 1600. The site of the wells is known as `Banal na Pook' (sacred site) and vestiges of the spring running close to the wells is known as `Banal na Tubig' (sacred water). The well is accessed from the San Lorenzo Luis Steps. An inconspicuous narrow walkway from the steps takes visitors to the well.
