= Our Lady of the Rosary Parish =

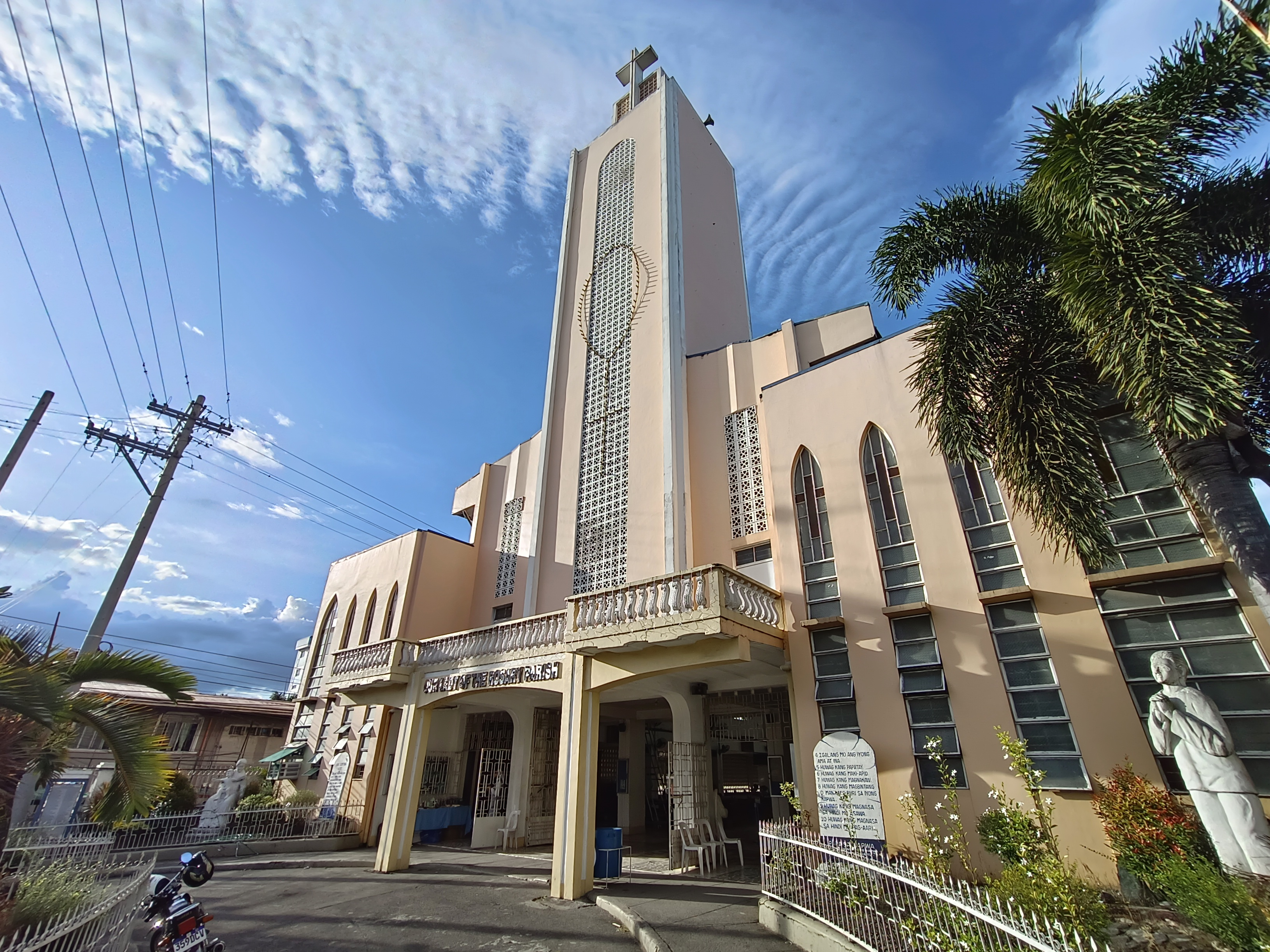
- Our Lady of the Rosary Parish
- 13.8453868522816°N 121.2053491838731°E
- Location: J Belen St cor. Gualberto Ave; Rosario, Batangas
- Country: Philippines
- Denomination: Catholic

History
- Former name: Our Lady of the Most Holy Rosary Parish
- Founded: 1698
- Founder: Order of Saint Augustine

Administration
- Province: Batangas
- Archdiocese: Archdiocese of Lipa
- Deanery: IX: Vicariate of Our Lady of the Holy Rosary

Clergy
- Archbishop: Most Rev. Gilbert Garcera, DD
- Dean: Rev. Fr. Arnold Rosal, OSJ
- Priest(s): Rev. Fr. Den Mark A. Malabuyoc, OSJ; Rev. Fr. Jayson DC. Endaya, OSJ; Rev. Fr. Jorge P. De Chavez, OSJ; Rev. Fr. Domingo D. Manalo, OSJ

Our Lady of the Rosary Parish is a Catholic church in Rosario, Batangas, Philippines. It is part of Vicariate IX: The Vicariate of Our Lady of the Holy Rosary of the Archdiocese of Lipa. The church is located at J Belen Street corner Gualberto Avenue in Poblacion B. It is the second church of Rosario after the Most Holy Rosary Parish located in Lumang Bayan (lit. 'Old Town'), the present-day Padre Garcia, Batangas.

== History ==
In 1687, the first mission pueblo was established by the Order of Saint Augustine, leading to the construction of a church two years later. The Church of Nuestra Señora del Rosario was founded in 1698, attaining parish status in 1776. However, the parish faced challenges due to the destruction of the church and the departure of priests during the revolution, resulting in a lack of pastoral care until 1910. After the Philippine–American War, Captain Ed Boughton transferred the town's location from Lumang Bayan to the foot of Tombol Hill, departing the first stone church of Rosario in now the town of Padre Garcia. In 1915, the parish was entrusted to Fr. Eugenio Gherlone, OSJ, with the arrival of the first Oblates of Saint Joseph missionaries. Under Fr. Edoardo Meda, OSJ, a new church was initiated in 1948. OSJ continues to serve the parish to this day.

== Gallery ==
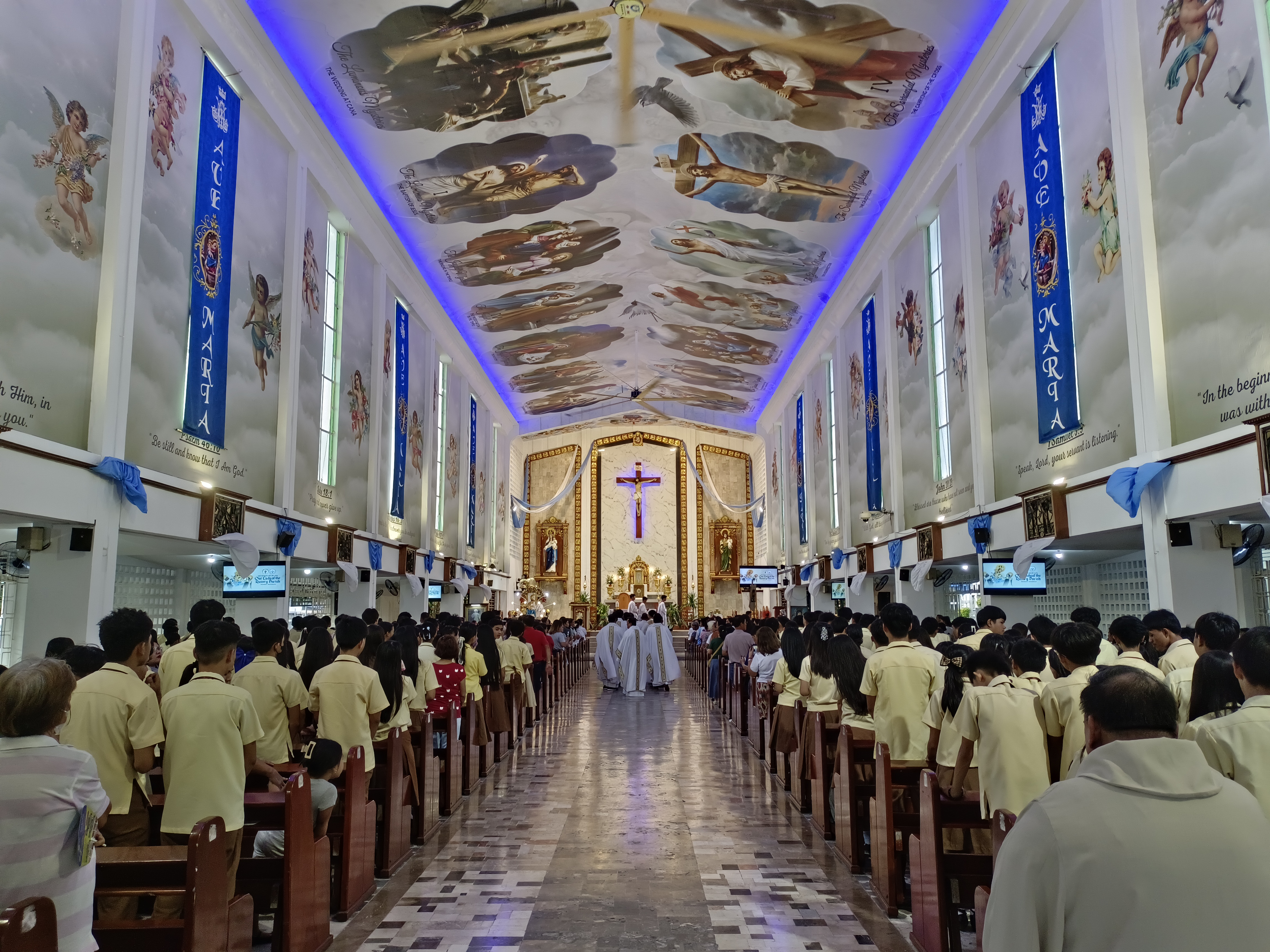
Church interior

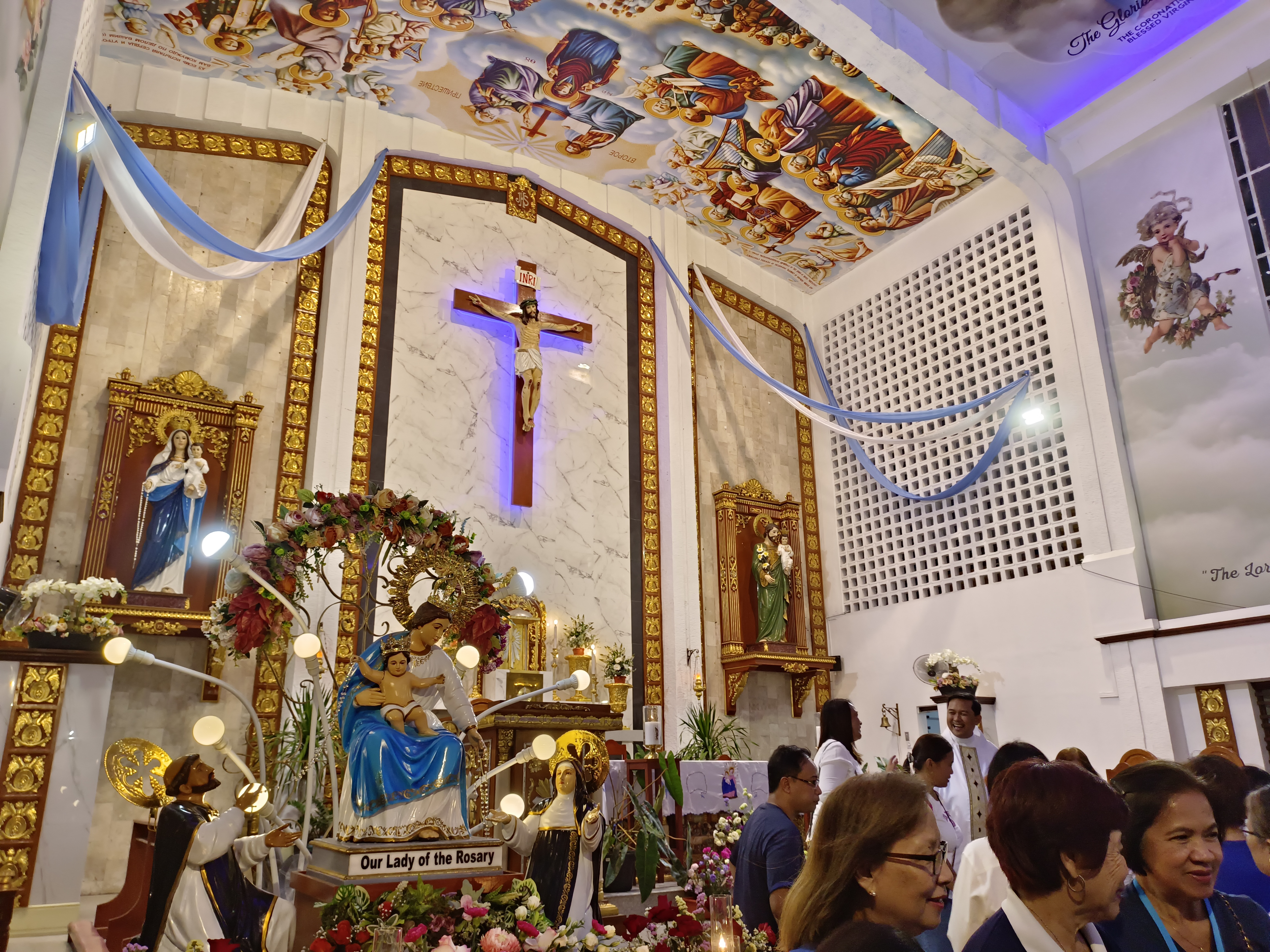
Image of Our Lady of the Rosary by the altar
