= Our Lady of Caysasay =

Marian image and Patroness of Taal, Batangas

Coordinates: 13°52′55.5″N 120°55′12.7″E

Our Lady of Caysasay La Virgen de Caysasay
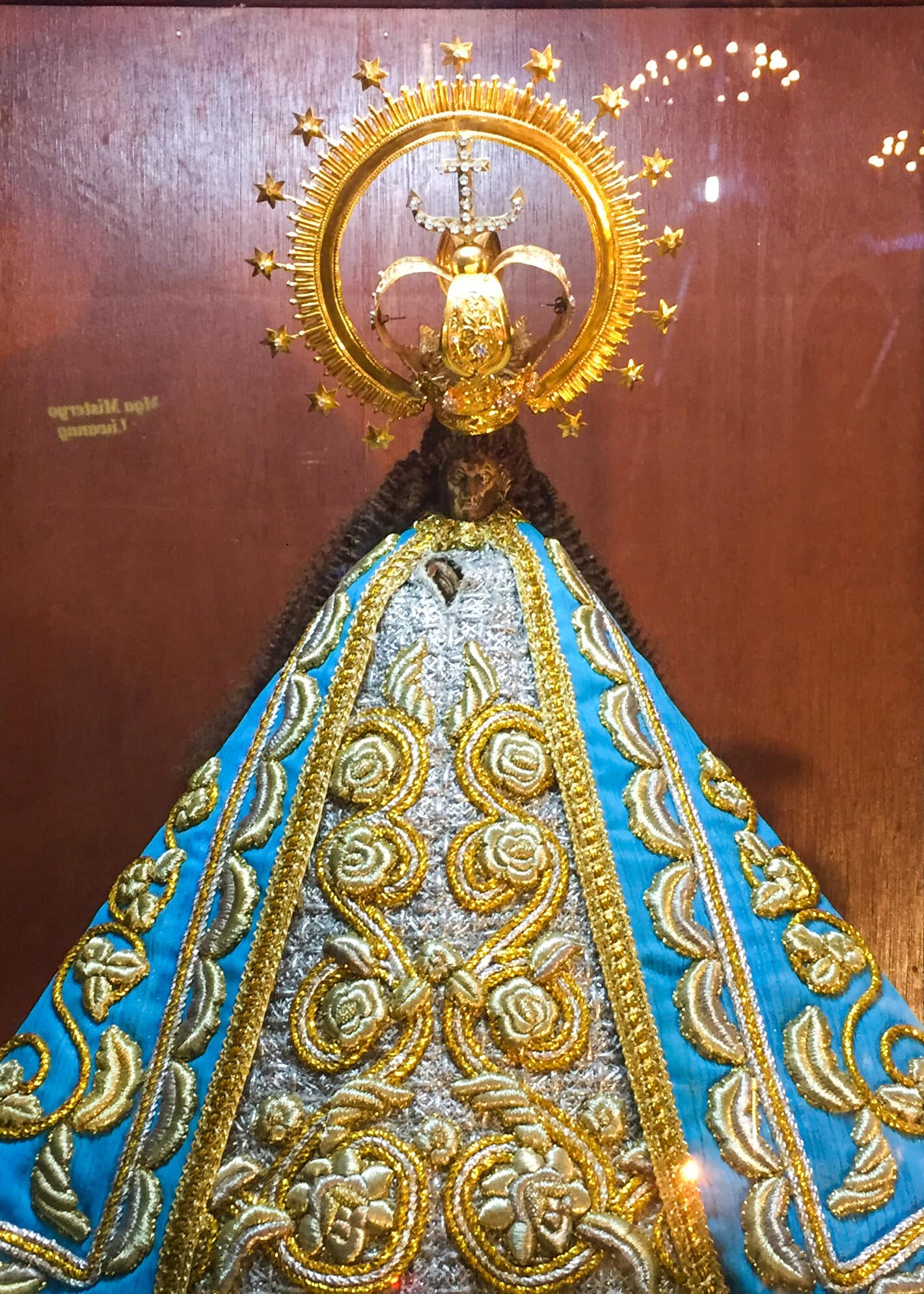
- Location: Taal, Batangas, Philippines
- Date: 1603
- Type: Wooden statue
- Approval: Pope Pius XII
- Venerated in: Catholic Church
- Shrine: Archdiocesan Shrine of Our Lady of Caysasay
- Patronage: Taal, Batangas, Archdiocese of Lipa, Our Lady of Caysasay Academy
- Attributes: conical dress, flowing hair, crown with an anchored cross on top

Our Lady of Caysasay (Spanish: Nuestra Señora de Caysasay) is a Roman Catholic Title of the Blessed Virgin Mary associated with an image of the Mother of God venerated at the Archdiocesan Shrine of Our Lady of Caysasay in Taal, Batangas, Philippines. The image depicts the Immaculate Conception is believed to be one of the oldest in the country, originally discovered in 1603 by a native man fishing in the Pansipit River. The subsequent Marian apparitions documented by Spanish colonial church leaders were the first in the country; devotees today continue to attribute miracles to the Virgin.

The actual image, which remains in its original appearance, was later named "Queen of the Archdiocese of Lipa". The feast day of the image and its title is every December 8–9.

== Description ==
The wooden image measures 272 mm (10.7 in), shows the Virgin as tilting slightly forward, her hands clasped across her breasts below her right shoulder. One eye is slightly bigger than the other. It was found wearing a simple, red tunic gathered above its waist that billowed into huge folds around the ankles, and clad in a green shawl.

The report and documentation of the apparitions of 1611—1619 and 1639, are unique in Philippine Church annals as they are believed to be the first Marian apparitions in the Philippines. In those days, the country was under the autonomous Mexican vicariate; Father Casimiro Díaz, who confirmed the apparitions and miracles, was a deputy of the order's Mexican center.

== History ==
=== Discovery ===
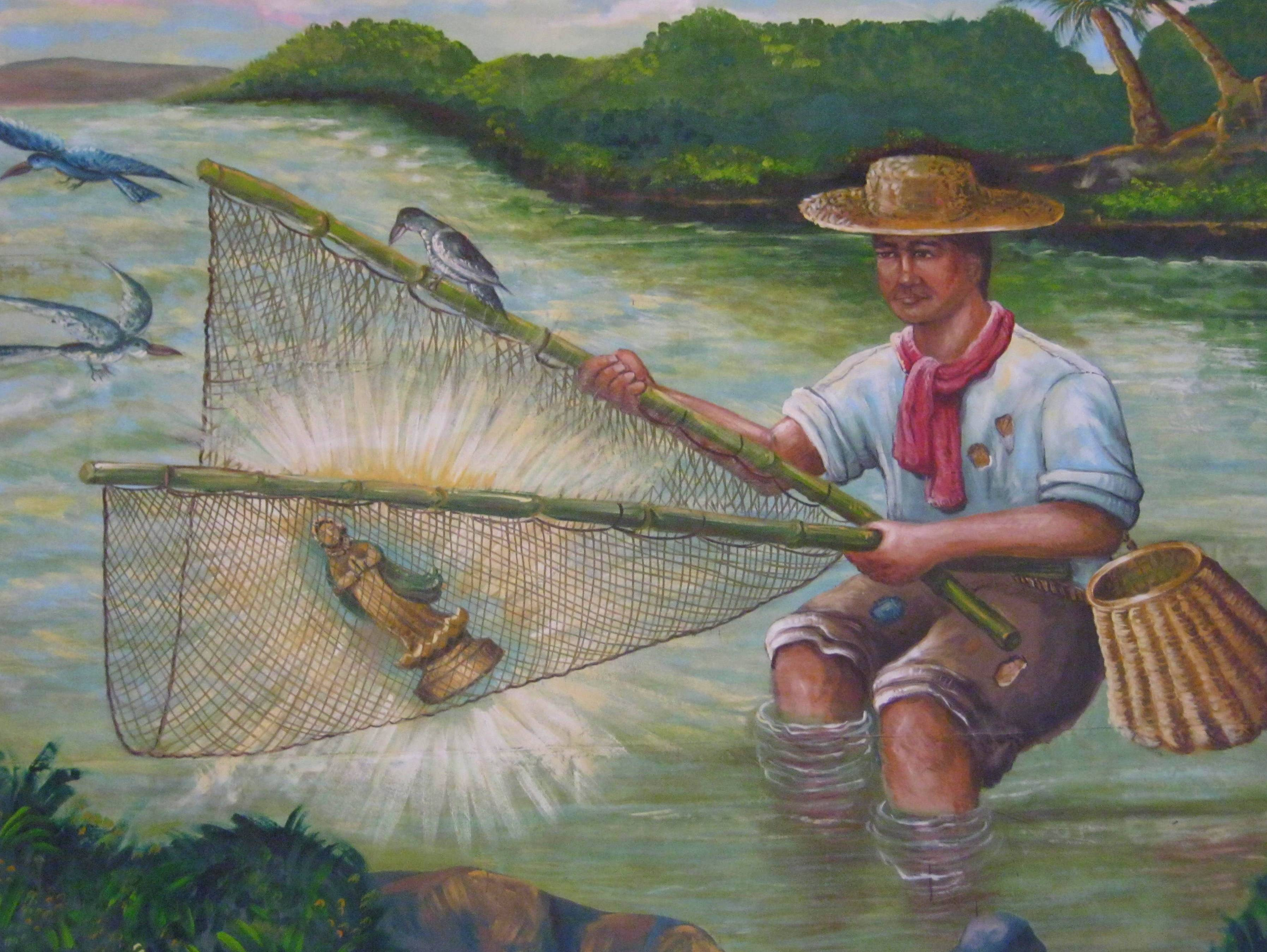
Fresco inside Caysasay Church, depicting Juan Maningcad catching the image.

In 1603 in Caysasay, which was a small barangay of Taal, a fisherman called Juan Maningcad cast his net into the Pansipit River instead of the sea. When he drew in his net, he caught a small, wooden image of the Blessed Virgin Mary less than a foot high. Though waterlogged, the image had a heavenly lustre, causing the pious Maningcad to prostrate himself and pray before the statue, which he then brought home.

The precise origins of the image and why it was in the river remain unknown. One theory is that the image was cast by a Spanish expedition into rough seas off Batangas during an expedition to pacify the waters, and that it was somehow pushed upriver. Another opinions are it was inadvertently dropped by someone exploring the river, or that it came from China. News of the image began to spread until it reached the parish priest, Fray Juan Bautista Montoya, and the vicar that represented the reigning King of Spain. They went to Maningcad's house to investigate, and upon seeing the image, knelt down in veneration.

=== Disappearances ===
Doña María Espíritu, the widow of the town's judge, was assigned as the image's camarera or caretaker. She ordered that a precious urna (a wooden, canopied shrine that sometimes has glass panes) be made for the image and kept it in her home. Every evening, she noticed that the image was missing from its urna, returning the next morning. The worried matron told this to the priest, who accompanied her back to her house and saw the urna was indeed empty, only to suddenly open as the image appeared before them. The priest gathered volunteers to keep vigil beside the image, and they reported how in the night they would see the urna open by itself, and the image leaving and coming back again.

The priest had the villagers come with lit candles and follow the image the next time it left. When this happened, they were led to Caysasay, where it was originally found. The priest decided to take the image to the Basilica of Saint Martin of Tours for safekeeping, but the image continued to leave the church until one day it disappeared and was nowhere to be found.

Years later, two girls named María Bagohin and María Talain were gathering firewood, and saw the image reflected in the waters of a spring near where Juan Maningcad had first found it. They looked up, and saw the image of the Lady of Caysasay on top of a tall sampaguita (Jasminum sambac) bush, flanked by two lit candles and guarded by several casay-casay (Collared kingfisher, Todiramphus chloris) that abounded in the hillside area, thus called Caysasay by the Spaniards. The two reported what they had seen to the parish priest, who concluded with the people it was the Virgin's wish to stay in Caysasay. A makeshift chapel was built on the very spot where the image was found, and native devotion to the Our Lady of Caysasay had started even without official church sanction. Fr. Pedro Murillo Velarde SJ in his Historia de Filipinas and other 18th century Spanish chroniclers put the year 1611 as when natives began reporting strange visions on the hillside. This was also the year, according to Fr. Pedro G. Galende, Director of the San Agustín Museum in Intramuros, that the first makeshift church was reportedly built there.

=== Apparition to Catalina Talain ===
A series of apparitions by the Blessed Virgin Mary were first reported at the rocky hillside of Caysasay. According to a church inquiry, a vision appeared to a native servant girl, Catalina Talain, who had gone up the hillside with a companion to gather firewood and fetch some water. The unexpected vision of something small in stature but radiating extraordinary brilliance from a hollow in the rocky landscape so bewildered the girl that she ran to tell her companion, and both fled terrified back to the town of Taal, by the shore of the lake. From the cave near the spring was found the image of the Blessed Virgin—the same image that was fished out of the river almost a decade earlier and mysteriously disappeared.

Historian José M. Cruz, S.J. reviewed original microfilm documents of the inquiry into the apparitions, which he dated to 1619. He reported that Church officials interrogated Talain, but she told them she could not clearly identify what she saw. The sparseness of her report, however, convinced Cruz that Talain was not fabricating the story; he noted in his study on the events that in 17th-century Philippines, a servant girl like Talain had much to gain from associating herself with God or the saints.

=== Apparition to Juana Tangui ===
The apparition of the Lady of Caysasay to Juana Tangui was a more documented report. Fr. Casimiro Díaz, a representative of the Mexican vicar, in his 18th century Conquista de las Islas Filipinas (Part II), gave a detailed account:

In a sitio called Bingsacan, near the village of Caysasay, around 1611, the natives saw several times, mainly at night, near a river where they go to fetch water, a very great light coming from a small opening in a large rock. From a distance it shone more brightly than four giant wax candles. As they got nearer, they could hear sweet and harmonious music made by very pleasant instruments, which entranced them, not so much because they did not expect to hear music but because of the divine melody that they heard. As they approached closer, some saw a beautiful hand and arm jutting out of the opening in the rock. It held a lighted torch, which moved up and down, though it remained in its place in the opening. They watched this light for a long time, listening to music. Others saw only the great ray of light, while still others saw that above the rock, there was a very great light, and another group saw a great flame, which seemed to devour that sitio.

After this unusual phenomenon, which had never before been seen or heard of in that place, some natives decided to see what it really was. They saw a vision of the Virgin Mary, just a little taller than the size of an open hand from the tip of the thumb to the tip of the middle finger, dressed in white, with a crown on her head, and in her arms was the Infant Jesus, who also wore a crown. Miraculous healing powers were attributed to waters from the spring. More than 30 people declared they saw visions of the Lady at Caysasay, and soon pilgrims flocked to the area.

The news reached a native named Juana Tangui, from the town of Bauan who was the servant of Don Juan Mangabot, one of the town's prominent natives. She was a simple, devout woman who had been suffering for a long time from a burning sensation in the eyes, leaving her almost blind. Her eyes could not be healed by the many remedies that had been applied to it, so she was resolved to go to the rock where people said the Blessed Virgin appeared. She went accompanied by one of her master's daughters to that place where the ray of light was first seen. She had also heard that everyone who bathed in the small stream was cured of any sickness of which they may have been suffering. For this reason, she bathed in the stream in the company of nine or ten other people doing the same. During the entire time of her bath, she noticed an unusual shadow by her side, though there was neither sun nor moon that could cause it, since it was already evening and it was very dark.

After some time she felt that someone was holding her and turning her body. When she turned to the place toward which she was being turned, she saw a great light, like that coming from an enormous lit candle, which caused her great wonder. But she did not dare to move forward in order to examine what she had seen. She went to a nearby field where she recounted what had happened to some native women. But they told her to return and to examine closely what it was. Since she said that she could not see very well, on account of her eye disease, they offered a young servant to accompany her to that place. The recent account of Fr. Cruz is similar but says it was a young servant boy who was sent back with Juana. Upon arriving at the spot, she made the girl kneel down. Juana walked further and saw a very bright light and the image of our Lady, almost two palm measurements in height, dressed in white, with a crown on her head and a cross on her forehead. The image seemed to be alive, as it was moving and blinking. When the native woman moved closer to her, the image spoke to her, thanking her for remembering her and coming back to see her. Juana declared that the apparition told her,

"You have been kindhearted to me, but unless you wear the belt of the Cofradía de San Agustin (Confraternity of Saint Augustine), do not come back to see me, until you are a member of the Confraternity, and you wear it."

The native woman returned to the town, and did not tell anyone about what had happened until she had spoken with Fr. Juan Bautista Montoya, prior of the Taal convento. She reverently asked him for the belt of or cincture the Confraternity, and after spending eight days in confession, the prior vested her in the belt.

She returned to the place where the Blessed Virgin had spoken to her. In addition to herself, she brought with her eight or nine people, among them the wife of her master, Doña Juliana Dimoyaguín and other prominent residents, whose declarations appear in the accounts published about the event. They returned to the same place where the girl who had accompanied her the first time had knelt down. She moved forward to the same spot where she had been a few days before, and she saw once more, clearly and distinctly, the Blessed Virgin. After making a deep bow, Juana knelt in her presence.

The Virgin told her that she was much more pleased with her than before, because she was wearing the belt of the Confraternity. The devout native asked the Virgin directly what sign she should carry so that people would believe that she had spoken to and been in the company of the Virgin. The Virgin responded by asking for Juana's rosary and belt, telling her that it was a sufficient sign for her to touch them. Juana gave the Queen of Heaven her belt and her rosary, together with the rosaries that her companions had taken care to bring with them.

The Virgin accepted them and then returned them to the said Juana Tangui. The women who received the rosaries declared that the fragrance that emanated from them elevated their souls. Moreover, Juana's eyes were healed, her eyesight restored.

=== Deliverance of the town ===
By 1732, the town of Taal became the prosperous capital of the Batangas province. The town center of Taal was then located along the shore of Taal Lake (then known as Lake Bombon). Its prosperity came from provisioning the Manila galleons plying between Acapulco and Manila. These galleons also found protection from typhoons at Taal Lake, which was then saline and open to the sea through the navigable Pansipit River. They honoured the Virgin of Caysasay with cannon fire as they passed by her shrine close to the river.

The violent 1754 eruption of Taal Volcano, which lasted over eight months, saw ejecta from the volcano destroying towns around the lake, and covering the landscape with layers of deposits. The townspeople of Taal and their parish priest, fled the capital and sought refuge at the Church of Our Lady of Caysasay. Layers of ejecta and deposits blocked the entrance of the Pansipit River, eventually raising the waters of the lake, and permanently flooding part or all of Tanauan, Lipa, Sala, Bauan and Taal. All five towns relocated to much higher ground, away from the volcano and lake, with present town center of Taal established on a hillside near the Caysasay Shrine above Balayan Bay. The townspeople believed the image had saved them during eruptions of Taal Volcano.

The old town center is now the present San Nicolas, Batangas. Eventually, a considerably narrower and shallower Pansipit River was formed as volcanic deposits rendered it impassable for large ships. Bombon Lake, later renamed Taal Lake, slowly transformed from saline to a freshwater lake.

== Pontifical coronation ==
Pope Pius XII issued a pontifical decree of coronation on 21 November 1954 to the Archbishop of Lipa, Alejandro Olalia y Ayson. The papal bull was signed by the Secretary Deacon of the Vatican Chapter, Giulio Carlo Rossi, and notarized by the Guardian Chancellor of the Vatican Chapter, Monsignor Ferdinand Prosperini Joseph Calderari.

On 8 December 1954, the coronation rites were presided by the Archbishop of Santiago de Compostela, Cardinal Fernando Quiroga Palacios.

== Santa Lucia Well ==
This old, spring-fed well where María Bagohin and María Talain saw the reflection of the Virgin of Caysasay is known as the Balón ng Sta. Lucia (Well of Saint Lucy), which was where public devotion to the Virgin of Caysasay was initially centred. A beautifully carved coral stone arch with a bas relief of the Virgin on the façade was constructed over the spring, which is on the slope of a hill near the church, forming twin wells. The exact reasons for Saint Lucy's connection to the spring has been lost, as is the actual date of the well's construction. The site of the well is known as "Banál na Poók" ("sacred place"), and vestiges of the spring running close to the wells are known as "Banál na Tubig" ("sacred water").

The well is accessible from the Saint Lorenzo Ruiz Steps behind Caysasay Church. An inconspicuous narrow walkway from the Steps takes visitors to the well itself.

To the townsfolk, the apparition had empowered the spring with healing powers. Continues Fr. Díaz:

"The Holy Image has performed numerous miracles, not only for those who have gone to the rock to ask for help from the Queen of Angels, but also for those who drank from the water and bathed in the nearby stream. These miracles are confirmed in the accounts that Fr. Pedro de Arce, Bishop of Cebu, and Governor of the Archbishopric of Manila ordered to be drawn up and prepared by Fr. Juan Bautista de Montoya, Prior of Taal, together with Fr. Gerónimo de Medrano and Fr. Juan de Rojas."

== Religious syncretism ==
The image is sometimes syncretised by Chinese Filipinos with the Taoist goddess Mazu, or the Buddhist goddess Guan Yin, due to its alleged origin and former veneration in Taiwan.

Both deities are considered archetype emanations of each other, with the comparative Catholic images of Our Lady of Antipolo and Our Lady of the Abandoned as additional emanations, as all four are related to water and/or travel.

== In popular media ==
In 2005, a musical play titled Mapághimaláng Birhen ng Caysasay ("Miraculous Virgin of Caysasay") was staged in July 2005 at the Cultural Center of the Philippines in Manila. The religious play was written and directed by Nestor U. Torre with music by National Artist for Music Ryan Cayabyab. It focuses on the 1639 miracle involving Chinese artisan named Hay Bing, who was brought to life after he was decapitated. After its initial run, a touring production took the musical throughout the Greater Manila Area including Batangas province.

== See also ==
- Our Lady of Camarin, a Guamanian statue also found by a fisherman
- Our Lady of Salambao, also found in a net and a focus of the Obando Fertility Rites
