= Lipa Cathedral =

Roman Catholic cathedral in Batangas, Philippines

San Sebastian Cathedral
- Metropolitan Cathedral of San Sebastian
- Lipa Cathedral
- Kalakhang Katedral ni San Sebastian (Filipino); Catedral Metropolitana de San Sebastián (Spanish)
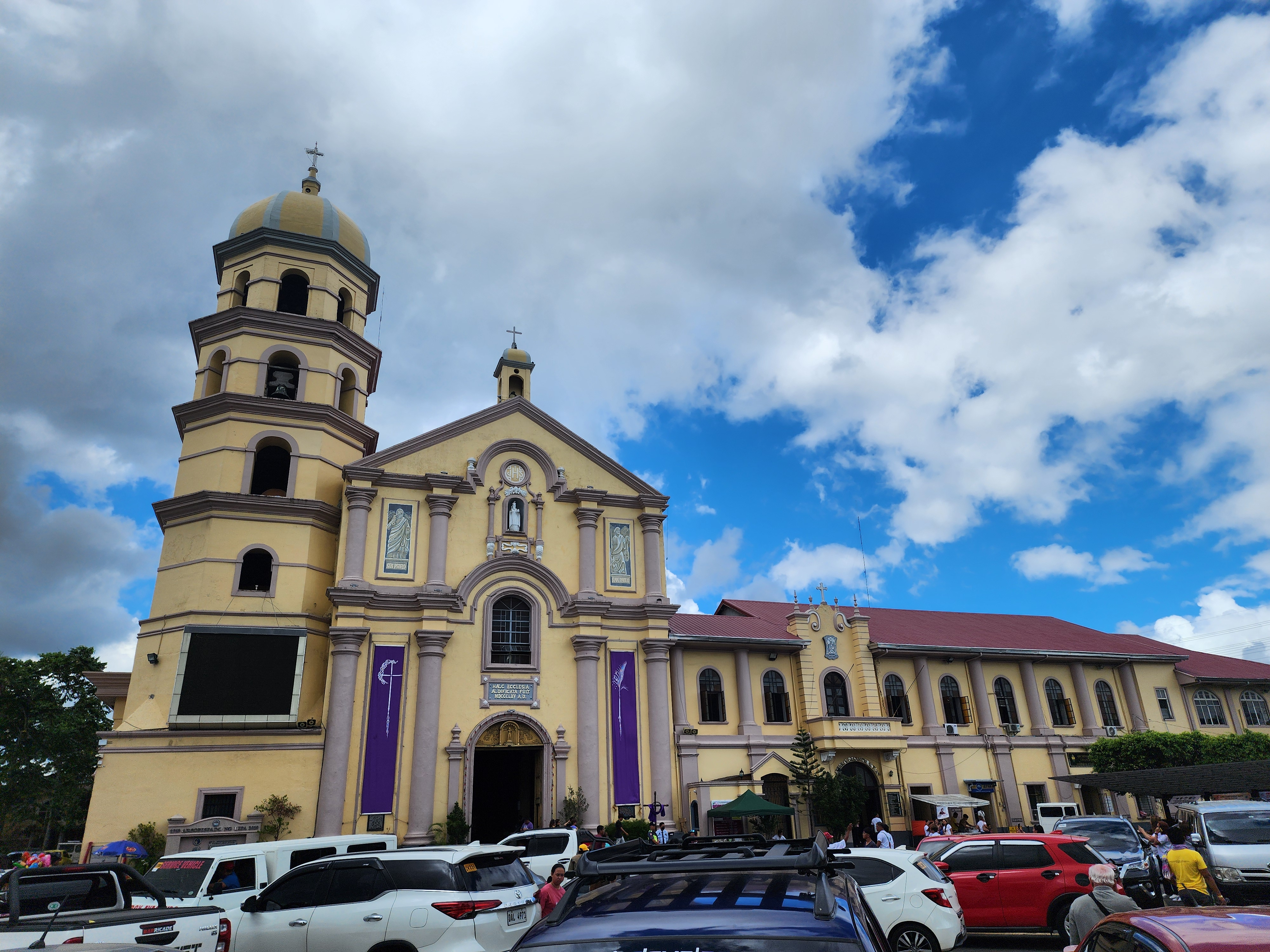
- The cathedral in March 2024

- Location in Luzon Location in the Philippines
- 13°56′27″N 121°09′48″E
- Location: Lipa, Batangas
- Country: Philippines
- Denomination: Roman Catholic

History
- Former name: Convento de San Sebastian de Comintang
- Status: Cathedral
- Founded: April 30, 1605; 421 years ago
- Founder: Augustinians
- Dedication: Saint Sebastian

Architecture
- Functional status: Active
- Architectural type: Cathedral
- Style: Neo-Renaissance
- Years built: c. 1605 (dst. 1754); 1779–1790, 1865, 1894 (dst. 1944); c. 1950s
- Completed: December 14, 1957; 68 years ago

Administration
- Province: Lipa
- Metropolis: Lipa
- Archdiocese: Lipa
- Deanery: Saint Sebastian

Clergy
- Archbishop: Gilbert Armea Garcera
- Rector: Ruben Dimaculangan

The Metropolitan Cathedral of San Sebastian, commonly known as Lipa Cathedral, is a Neo-Renaissance cathedral in Lipa, Batangas, Philippines. The cathedral serves as the seat of the Archdiocese of Lipa. The cathedral was chosen as the seat of the then Diocese of the Lipa in 1910. Detached from the Archdiocese of Manila and canonically erected by Pope Pius X, it comprised what are today the provinces of Batangas, Quezon, Aurora, Laguna, Marinduque, Occidental Mindoro, Oriental Mindoro, and part of the Camarines area.

== History ==
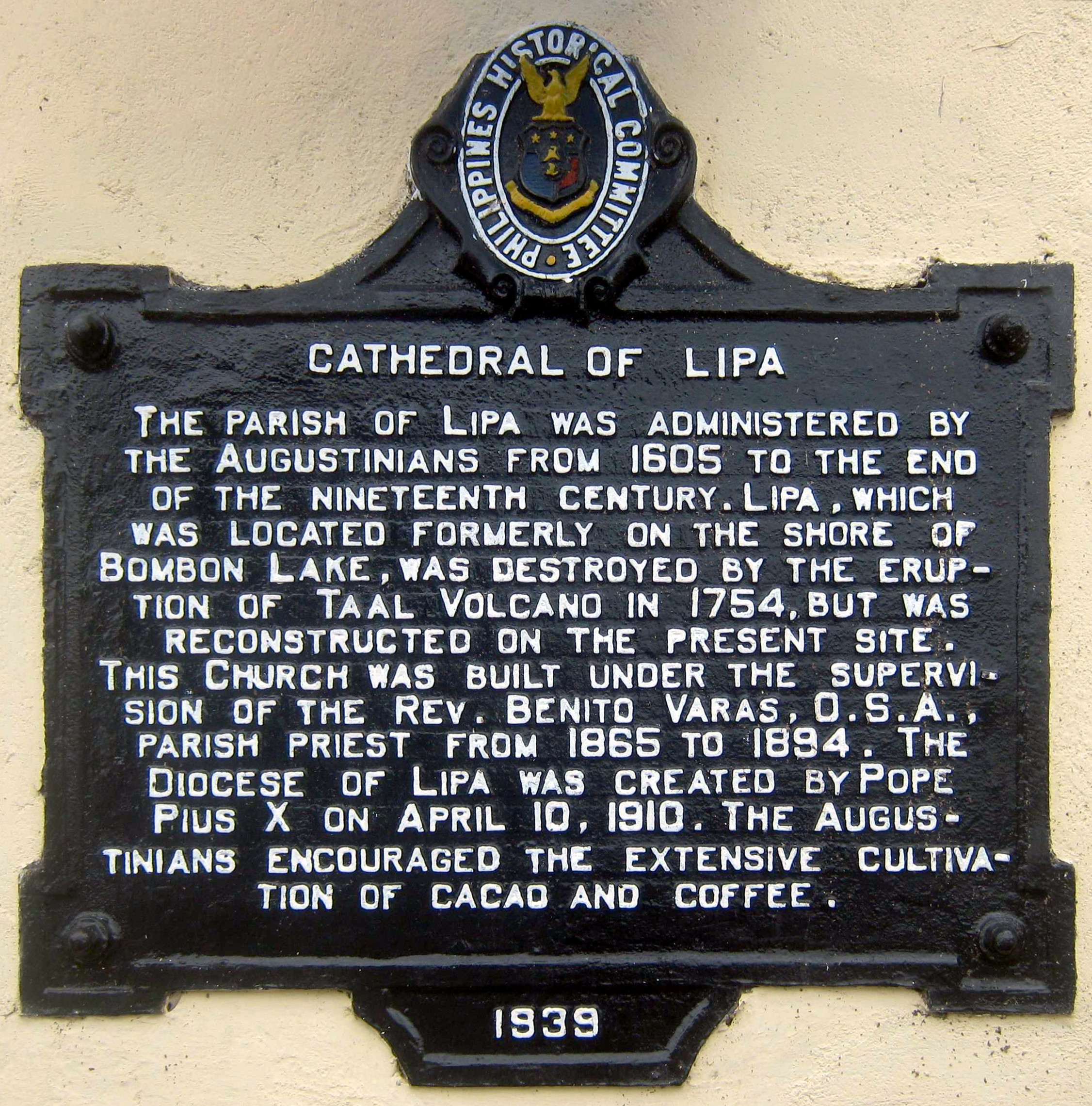
Church PHC historical marker installed in 1939

=== Earlier churches ===
Lipa was originally located close to the Laguna de Bombon, present-day Taal Lake. The Augustinian Chapter accepted Lipa under the name of "Convento de San Sebastian de Comintang" on April 30, 1605, with Gabriel Rodriguez as the first prior. In 1608, it was made a vicariate directly under the father province. In 1610, it was given the right to vote in the provincial chapters.

In 1754, Lipa was submerged after the eruption of Taal Volcano. To avoid a similar occurrence, the town was transferred to its present site. A new church was begun by Ignacio Pallares in 1779 and by Manuel Galiana in 1787, and was completed in 1790. In 1865, Maueal Diez Gonzalez completed the spacious transept.

=== Present church ===
Benito Baras completed the construction of the church in 1894 and later built a bridge linking Lipa to Tanauan. On September 17, 1902, shortly after the Philippine Revolution of 1898, Pope Leo XIII issued the apostolic constitution Quae Mari Sinico mandating the reorganization of the church in the Philippines. His successor, Pius X, by papal declaration "Novas Erigere Ecclesias", erected five new ecclesiastical jurisdictions in the Philippines: the Dioceses of Lipa, Calbayog, Tuguegarao, Zamboanga, and the Apostolic Prefecture of Palawan.

During the late 19th century, there was intense competition among the towns of Batangas, Bauan, Lipa, Taal, and Tanauan for the selection of the seat of the new diocese in the Southern Tagalog region (present-day Calabarzon). This competition motivated the people to build big churches in those towns. After the creation of the new diocese on April 10, 1910, Lipa was chosen among the five towns because of its cold climate. For this reason, the church was elevated to a cathedral.

In 1944, the cathedral was heavily damaged during the Japanese occupation of the Philippines as part of the Second World War. It was later rebuilt by Alejandro Olalla and Vergara, adding two side aisles, and completed on December 14, 1957.

== Architecture and design ==
The cathedral was built in the Neo-Renaissance style in a Latin cross (cruciform) layout. The Main Hall is surrounded by a series of arches forming a linear pattern. It also features a large dome.

An octagonal bell tower stands beside the main façade. It originally had five floors, later increased to seven during its post-war reconstruction.

The cathedral also has one high altar with the image of Saint Sebastian on top and four smaller side altars.

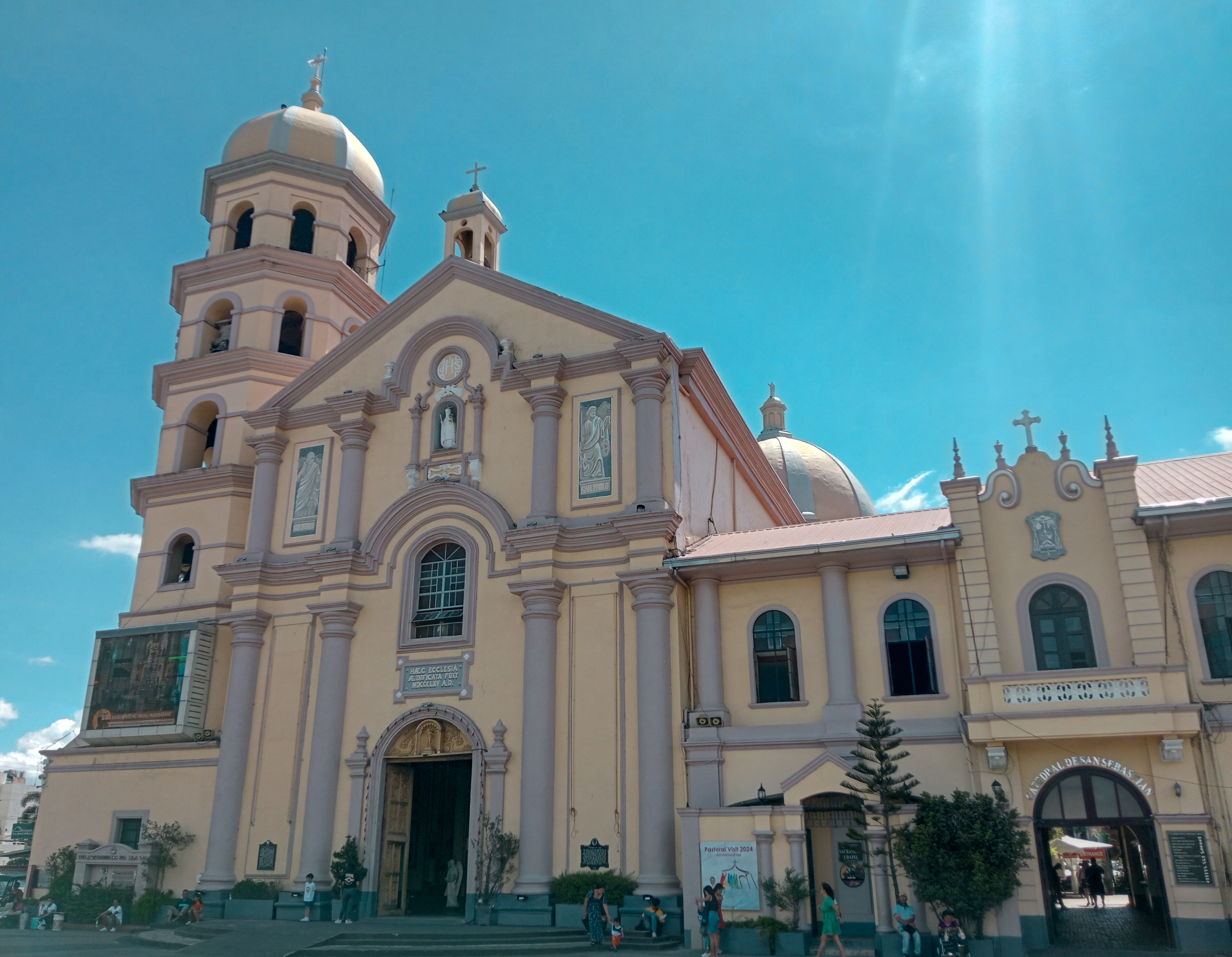
Main façade

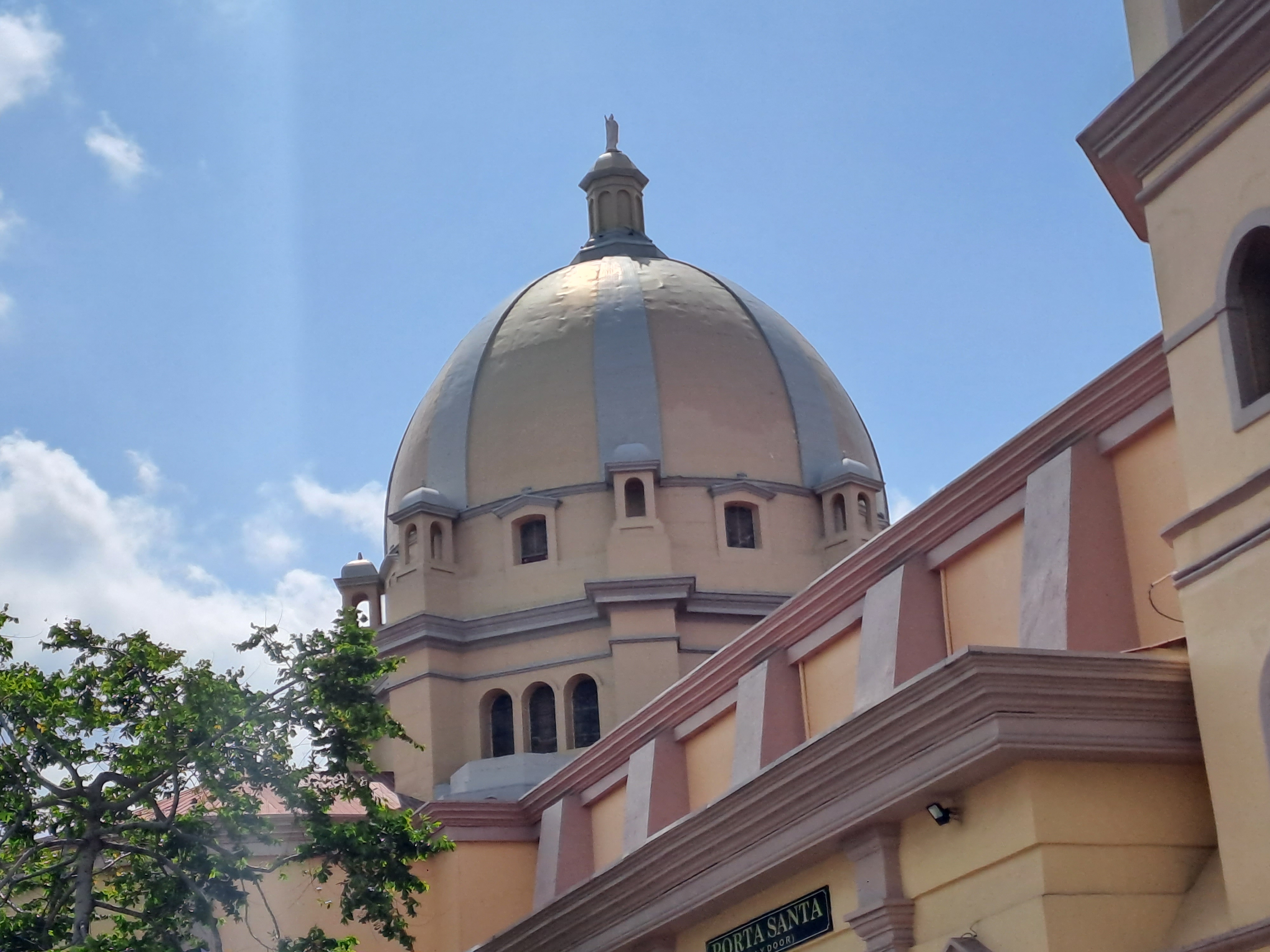
Dome

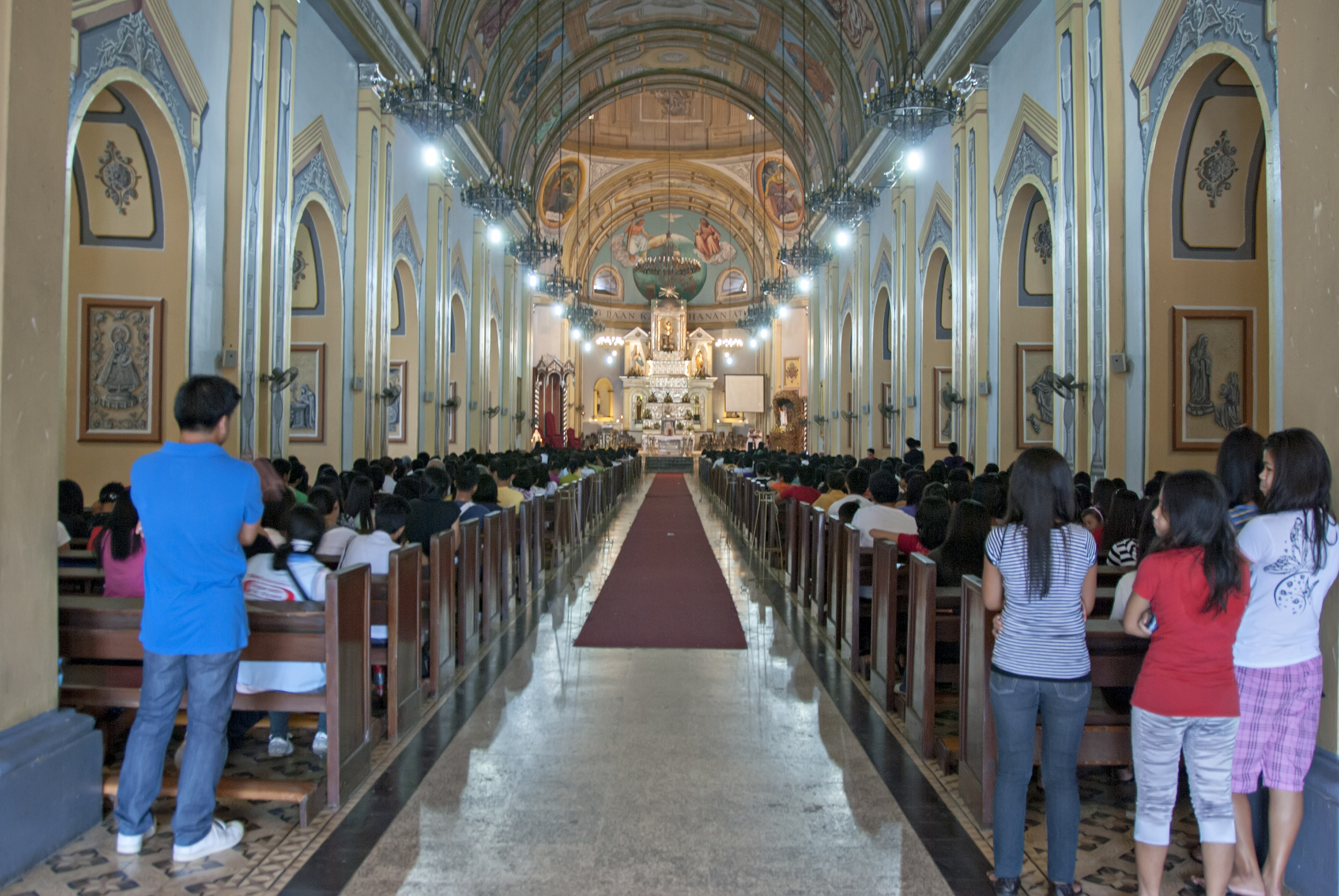
Interior facing the sanctuary

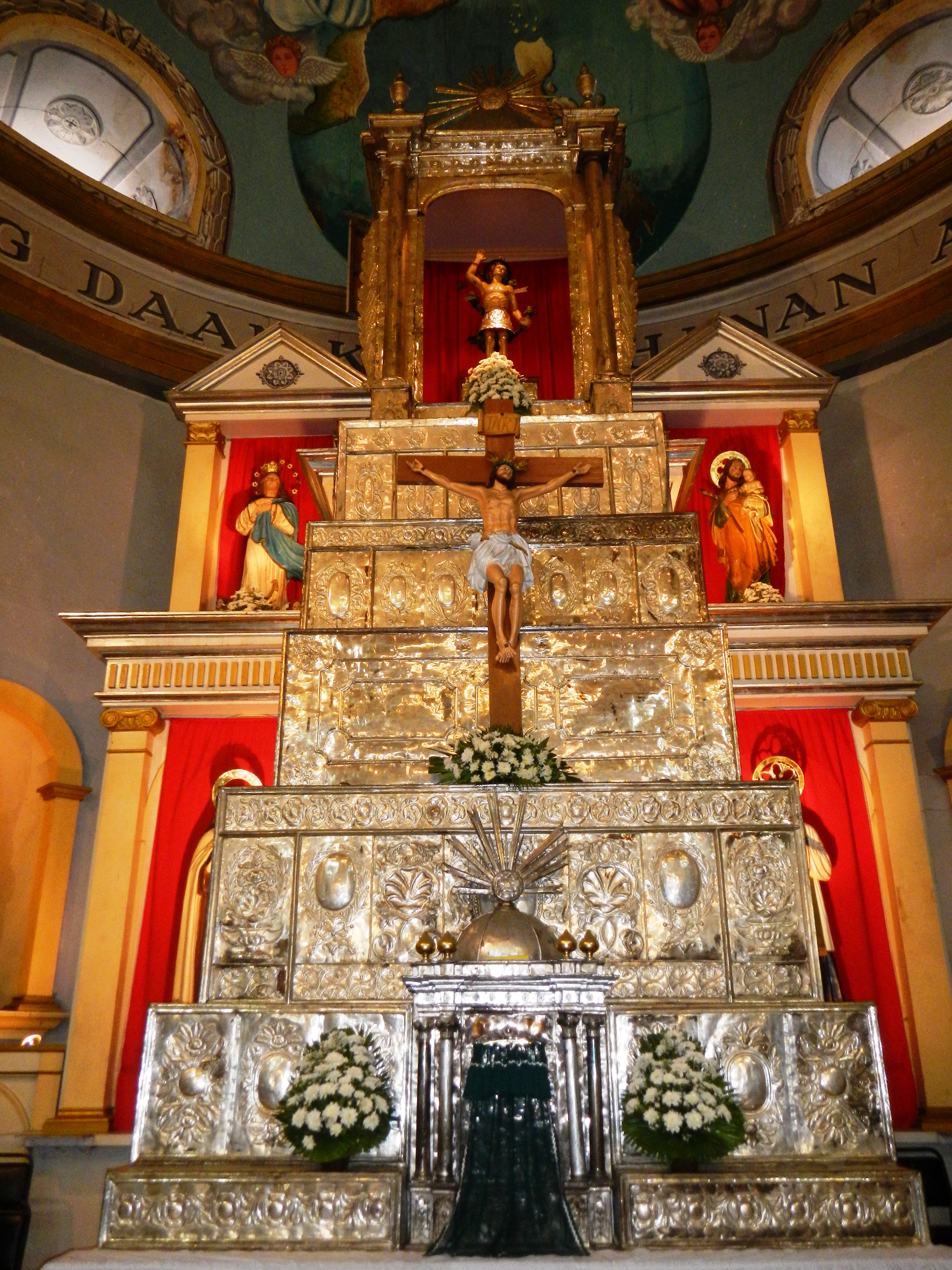
High altar
