= Feradi Minus =

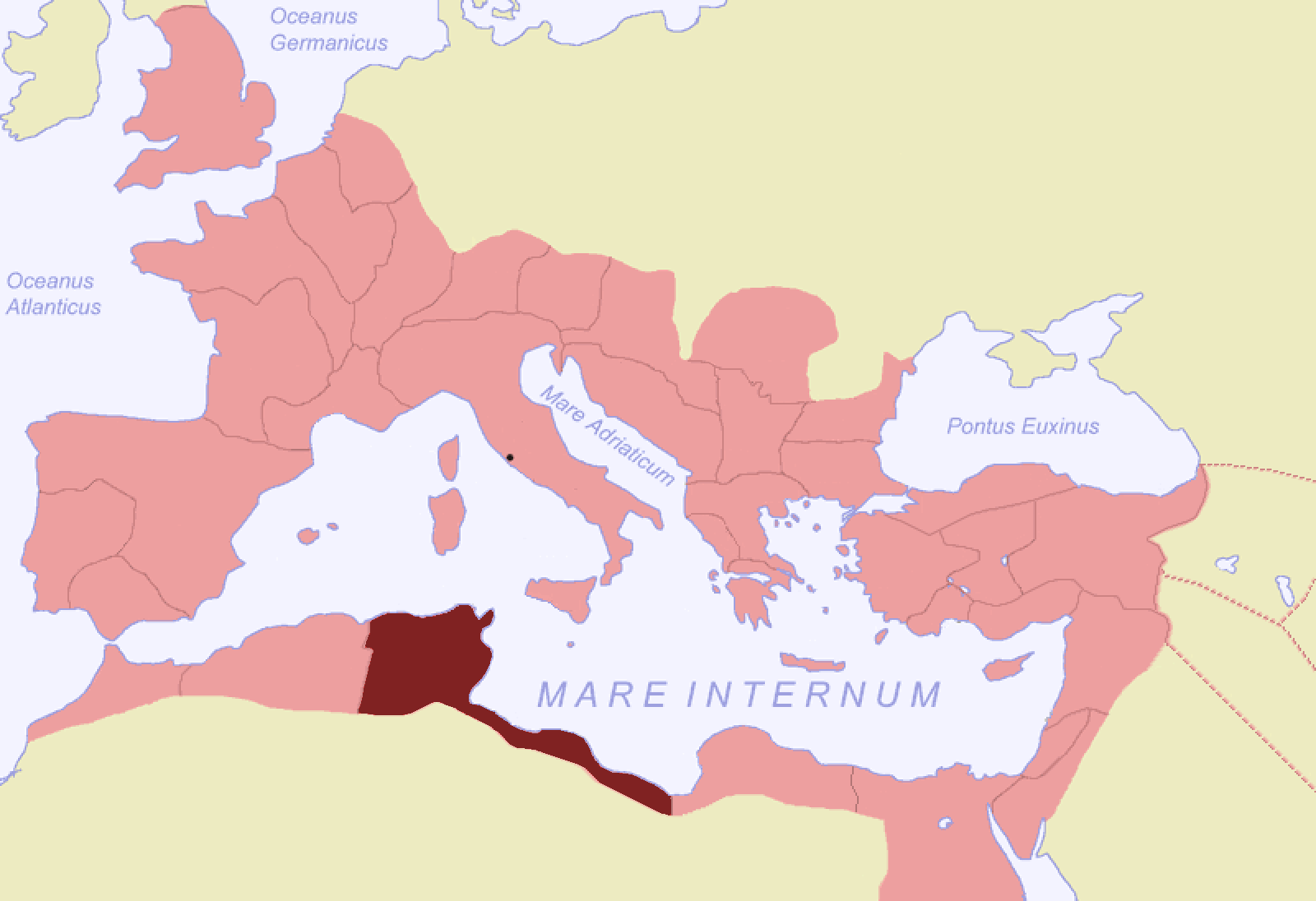
Africa proconsularis SPQR.

Feradi Minor was an ancient town in the Roman province of Africa proconsularis in the Sahel region of Tunisia. During late antiquity it was in the province of Byzacena.

During the Roman Empire Ferada was a civitas of the Roman province of Byzacena. Unlike its namesake, Pheradi Majius, the exact location of this town is unknown, but it was located in what is northern Tunisia.

Feradi Minor, was also the seat of an ancient episcopal see of the Roman Catholic Church. Only one bishop of this diocese is known, Feliciano, a Catholic bishop at the Council of Carthage of 411 at that time the seat had no Donatist bishops. Today Feradi Minor survives as titular bishopric and the current bishop is Canavarros Edmilson Tadeu dos Santos, who replaced Salvador Q. Quizon in 2016.
