= Salvador Q. Quizon =

20th and 21st-century Filipino bishop

- Auxiliary Bishop-Emeritus of Roman Catholic Archdiocese of Lipa
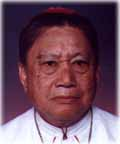
- Church: Roman Catholic Church
- See: Archdiocese of Lipa
- In office: 09 June 1979 – 06 April 2002

Orders
- Ordination: 12 March 1949
- Consecration: 22 August 1979 by Bruno Torpigliani
- Rank: Bishop

Personal details
- Born: December 6, 1924; Manila, Philippine Islands
- Died: August 5, 2016 (aged 91); Lipa, Batangas, Philippines
- Motto: In finem diligam
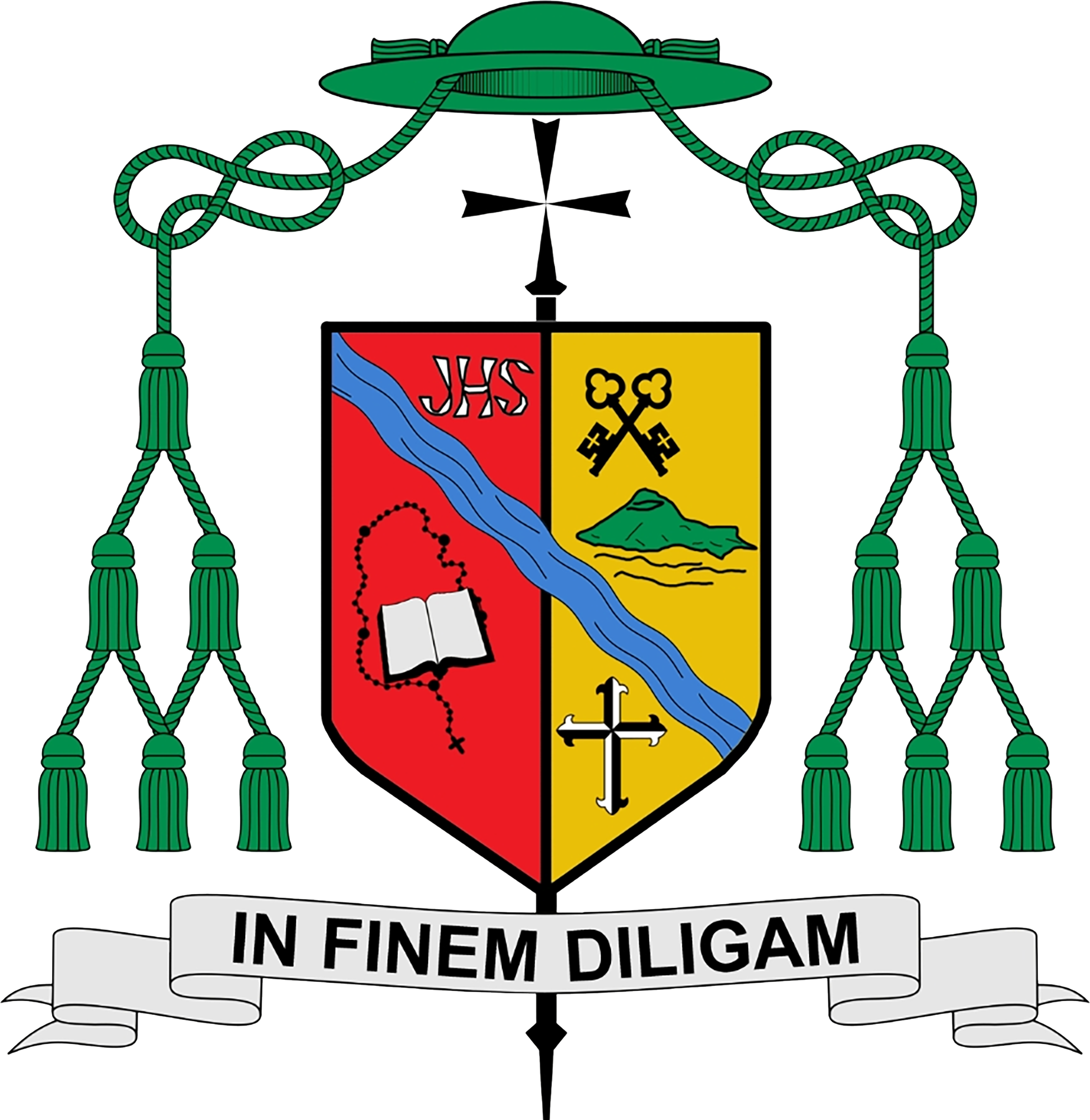
- Coat of arms

Styles of Salvador Q. Quizon
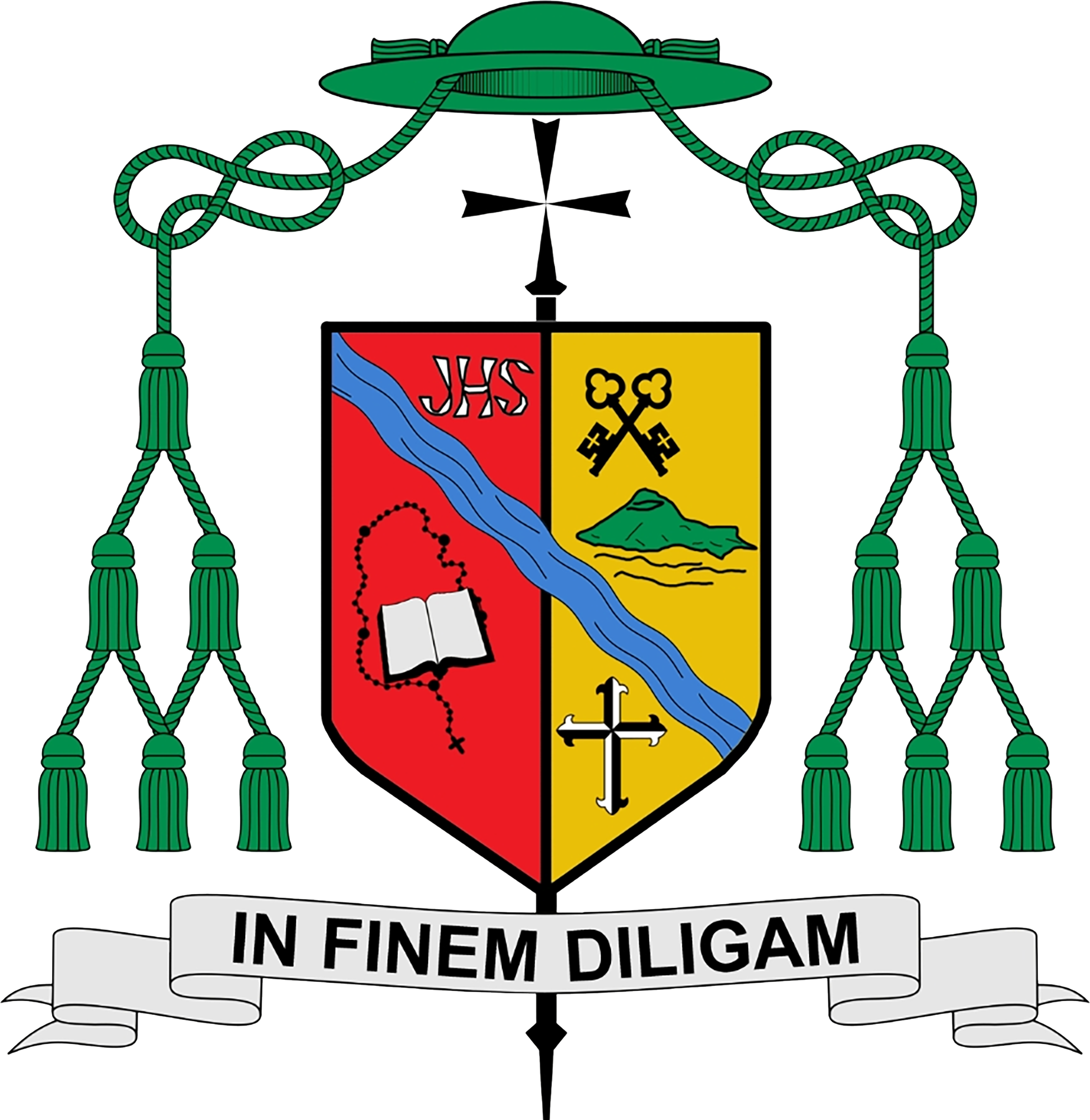
- Reference style: His Excellency; The Most Reverend
- Spoken style: Your Excellency
- Religious style: Bishop

Salvador Q. Quizon (December 6, 1924 – August 5, 2016) was a Filipino prelate of the Catholic Church.

Quizon was born in Manila, Philippines, was ordained a priest on March 12, 1949, and consecrated bishop on August 22, 1979. Quizon was appointed auxiliary bishop of the Archdiocese of Lipa on 1979. Quizon retired as Auxiliary Bishop of the Archdiocese of Lipa on April 6, 2002. He was the Titular Bishop of Feradi Minus
