= Edwin Panergo =

Filipino Catholic bishop (born 1971)

His Excellency, The Most Reverend Edwin Oracion Panergo DD, STL, MA
- Bishop of Boac
- Church: Roman Catholic Church
- Province: Lipa
- See: Boac
- Appointed: October 4, 2025
- Installed: December 2, 2025
- Predecessor: Marcelino Antonio Maralit

Orders
- Ordination: September 8, 1997 by Emilio Z. Marquez
- Consecration: December 1, 2025 by Gilbert Garcera

Personal details
- Born: Edwin Oracion Panergo; September 7, 1971 (age 55) Lucban, Quezon, Philippines
- Education: Saint Francis de Sales Major Seminary; Saint Alphonsus School of Theology; Saint Louis University; Institut Notre-Dame de Vie
- Motto: Synodus (Latin for 'Journeying together')
- Coat of arms: Edwin Oracion Panergo's coat of arms

Ordination history
History
Priestly ordination
- Ordained by: Emilio Z. Marquez (Lucena)
- Date: September 8, 1991
- Place: Lucena Cathedral
Episcopal consecration
- Principal consecrator: Gilbert Garcera (Lipa)
- Co-consecrators: Mel Rey Uy; Emilio Z. Marquez
- Date: December 1, 2025
- Place: Lucena Cathedral

Styles of Edwin O. Panergo
- Reference style: His Excellency; The Most Reverend
- Spoken style: Your Excellency
- Religious style: Monsignor, Bishop

Edwin Oracion Panergo (born September 7, 1971) is a Filipino Catholic prelate who is the current bishop of Boac in the Philippines.

== Early life and education ==
Panergo was born on September 7, 1971, in Lucban, Quezon. He studied High school at Our Lady of Mount Carmel Seminary in Sariaya. He studied philosophy at Saint Francis de Sales Major Seminary in Lipa, Batangas, and theology at Saint Alphonsus School of Theology in Lucena. He went on to study at Saint Louis University in Baguio City, where he received a Master of Arts in Guidance and Counseling. He then earned his Licentiate in Sacred Theology at Institut Notre-Dame de Vie in Venasque, France.

== Ministry ==
=== Priesthood ===
Panergo was assigned as assisting deacon of Our Lady of the Angels Parish in Atimonan. He was ordained to the priesthood for the Diocese of Lucena on September 8, 1997, at the Saint Ferdinand Cathedral. He was then assigned as parochial vicar of the Minor Basilica of Saint Michael the Archangel in Tayabas, an assignment he held until 1998. He was also a team ministry member at St. Roche Parish in Barangay Ilasan, Tayabas City, from 1998 to 2000. In Unisan, he was parish priest of St. Roche Parish in Barangay Panaon from 2000 to 2002. Subsequently, he became the spiritual director of Our Lady of the Most Holy Rosary Seminary in Lucban from 2002 to 2009 and 2012 to 2015. He was then appointed as Rector of Our Lady of Mount Carmel Seminary in Sariaya his alma mater in 2015.

Within the Diocese of Lucena, he was the director of the diocese's Commission on Vocations.

=== Episcopate ===
On October 4, 2025, Pope Leo XIV appointed Panergo as the fifth bishop of Boac, replacing Marcelino Antonio Maralit, who, in 2024, was transferred to the Diocese of San Pablo by Leo's predecessor, Pope Francis. Prior to his appointment, the diocese was overseen by its diocesan administrator, Msgr. Elino P. Esplana, since November 2024.

He was consecrated bishop at St. Ferdinand Cathedral, Lucena, Quezon on December 1, 2025, and was installed the next day at the Immaculate Conception Cathedral Parish in Boac, Marinduque by Lucena Bishop Mel Rey Uy.

Catholic Church titles
Preceded by Marcelino Antonio Maralit	Bishop of Boac; December 2, 2025 – present	Incumbent
