= Maryhill College =

Roman Catholic college in Lucena, Philippines

- Dalubhasaang Maryhill
- Former names: Maryknoll Academy (1938-1977); Maryhill Academy (1977-1996)
- Motto: Veritas (Latin)
- Motto in English: Truth
- Type: Private Catholic school
- Established: 1938
- Religious affiliation: Roman Catholic
- Academic affiliations: PAASCU; CEAP; LUDICSA
- President: Most. Rev. Mel Rey Uy D.D.
- Director: Rev. Fr. Allan Neil L. Laqueo
- Location: M.L. Tagarao St., Barangay V, Lucena City, Quezon Province, Philippines; 13°56′11″N 121°36′45″E
- Campus: Urban Main; M.L.Tagarao St., Lucena City Satellite; Ciudad Maharlika Subd., Iyam, Lucena City (Pre and Primary school); Sta. Isabel Village, Isabang, Tayabas City (Pre and Primary school)
- Colors: Green and Gold
- Nickname: Maryknollers
- Website: www.maryhillcollege.edu.ph

Maryhill College (Filipino: Dalubhasaang Maryhill) formerly Maryknoll is a non-stock, non-profit Roman Catholic basic and higher educational institution in Lucena City, Philippines. It was founded in 1938 initially named as Lucena Catholic School and eventually become Maryknoll Academy on the same year . The school is part of the mission of the Maryknoll Sisters of St. Dominic . The school has basic education which is composed of primary and secondary education, and also has higher education.

== History ==
The history of Maryhill College dates back to 1938 when the Bishop of Lipa, Alfredo Versoza, D.D., together with Fr. Ulric Arcand, MEP a Canadian priest who belongs to the Paris Foreign Missions Society and Don Daniel Marquez envisioned to have a Maryknoll school in Lucena City. They started to implement their vision to establish a school by constructing a school building and was initially called Lucena Catholic School. the moment of grace was coupled with the arrival of the first Maryknoll Sisters in the same year. They were Sr. Mary de Chantal, Sr. Maria Concepcion, and Sr. Maura Shaun.

The intensified school Operation focused on these goals: to lead souls to God, to train the minds of the students by providing solid Catholic Education preparing them for life, and to form a lay apostolate among the youth who would fearlessly and intelligently keep the faith alive and responsibly share it with others.

The Maryknoll Sisters, imbued with spiritual in-depth, educational leadership skills and passion for spiritual formation, forged the first 250 students to learning. Eventually the school was officially named Maryknoll Academy, the school momentarily ceased operation due to the outbreak of World War II in 1941.

World War II and post-war development

During World War II, Maryknoll Academy temporarily ceased operations as its campus was used as a garrison by the Japanese forces during the occupation of Lucena. It resumed its operation in 1945 and obtained Government Recognition from the Bureau of Private Education for its Elementary and Secondary courses in 1946, A long period of stability and growth followed.

Maryknoll Rapid expansion efforts in both infrastructures and academics were facilitated by the following Maryknoll Sisters at the helm of the school's administration: Sr. Robert Marie (1953–1955), Sr. Stephen Marie (1956–1958), Sr. Carmen Eser (1959–1962),

During the tenure of Sr. Joseph Aileen (1962–1968) as school Principal, the rapid student population growth necessitated the construction of a two-storey building in 1958; As an outreach program, the school initiated the opening of an extension campus in llasan, Tayabas, Quezon in 1968. it made available to the youth in llasan, Tayabas, Quezon an affordable Catholic education. (until 1976 when it became the San Roque Parochial School under the administration of the Parish). When Sr. Ancilla Marie (1968–1973) was the school Principal, the school offered a night high school and Vocational courses to serve the needs of those who are working at daytime and interested in attending school after work. The first enrolees of the program were 76 students comprising house aides, tricycle drivers and sales ladies. This Night High School program prospered until 1979.

Transition from Maryknoll Sisters to Diocese of Lucena and Lay Administration

After the Second Vatican Council, the Maryknoll congregation began to evaluate its work in the light of their original apostolate as a missionary order. In the 1960s, the Maryknoll congregation saw the readiness of the Filipino Catholic to continue the education mission they had started. In 1977, the ownership of the school was turned over to the Roman Catholic Diocese of Lucena and management of the school was turned over to lay administrators. In accordance with the agreement, the name Maryknoll was to be changed to pave the way for the promotion of the school's unique identity, distinct although not disconnected from the identity of the Maryknoll sisters. In 1976, after a series of consultations, Maryknoll Academy was renamed Maryhill Academy.

The administration was entrusted to Ms. Lourdes C. Glinoga as Directress; Mr. Victor Panopio, as High School Principal and Mrs. Corazon C. Belarmino, as Grade School Principal. Committed to the tasks entrusted as educational leaders.

another extension building was built behind the cathedral's Rectory called the lay administration building, The buildings' strategic location created a quadrangle inside the campus where student gatherings were held.

PAASCU Accreditation

Maryhill applied the High School Department to the Philippine Accrediting Association for the Schools, Colleges and Universities (PAASCU) and was awarded accreditation in 1975. and become the first accredited school in Quezon Province.

Maryhill Academy became one of the founding institutions to spearhead and organize the Lucena Diocese Catholic Schools’ Association (LUDICSA) in 1977.

From Academy to College

Another milestone for Maryhill Academy was when CHED approved its tertiary level operation in 1996. With an approved collegiate operation, the name of the school was changed from Academy to College. Thirty-seven students were the first enrollees of the college department.

Courses initially offered were Bachelor of Arts, Bachelor in Secondary Education, Bachelor in Elementary Education, Bachelor of Science in Business Administration and Computer Secretarial Course.

Under the administration of then school president Most Rev. Emilio Z. Marquez, D.D. following physical structures has been added: the covered court, the three-storey Pope John Paul II building for additional classrooms and administrative offices, the Pope Benedict XVI Building for the Pre-Elementary and Elementary students, the Technology and Livelihood Education Building and a new canteen.

Education During the COVID-19 Pandemic

In late March 2020, the school had to cease face-to-face operations due to the ongoing COVID-19 pandemic, and also following the presidential order of then president, Rodrigo Duterte, to cease all every day activities and strongly encouraged everyone to stay at home to curb the spread of the virus. The sudden disruption of regular classes forced Maryhill College to utilize online meetings or modular learning to continue the education of its students through the height of the pandemic between 2020-2021.

After the rollout of different vaccines, students are eventually allowed to return to school in 2022, albeit with restrictions due to the ongoing threat of COVID. The school is currently utilizing the "Blended Learning", to where students and teachers have a specific date to be present at the campus to lower the chance of an outbreak occurring. Maryhill is planning to reintroduce the normal face-to-face classes as early as 2023.

Present-day operations

Maryhill College is one of the schools of the Roman Catholic Diocese of Lucena. Its main campus is on M.L. Tagarao Street in Barangay 5, Lucena City, beside St. Ferdinand Cathedral, and it also operates satellite campuses in Ciudad Maharlika, Lucena, and in Tayabas City. The school offers basic education from pre-elementary to senior high school, as well as undergraduate programs in its Higher Education Department, which includes a College of Accountancy and a College of Business Administration.

== Publication ==
"The Arcade GS" is the formal publication name of the Lower Basic Education Department, "The Arcade" for the Higher Basic Education Department, and "The Collis" for the Higher Education Department.

== Maryhill Ciudad Maharlika Campus ==
Maryhill College satellite campus was opened in 1996. A coeducational campus, it is located at Ciudad Maharlika Village Ilayang Iyam, Lucena City.

== Maryhill Avida Villages Campus ==
Maryhill Premier School satellite campus was opened in 2002. A coeducational campus, it is located at Avida Villages Isabang, Tayabas City.

== Former Maryhill Campus ==
Maryknoll Academy Ilasan now San Roque Parochial School A coeducational school, it is located at Brgy.Ilasan, Tayabas City.

== Schools and degree Programs ==
=== Lucena Main Campus ===
Integrated Basic Education

- Pre-Elementary
- Kinder
- Preparatory
- Elementary
- Junior High School

Senior High School

- Science, Technology, Engineering, and Mathematics (STEM)
- Humanities and Social Sciences (HUMSS)
- Accountancy and Business Management (ABM)

=== Presidents and Chairman Board of Trustees ===
- Alfredo Versoza, D.D. (Feb.1938-Feb.1951)
- Alfredo Obviar, D.D. (Nov.1950-Sept.1976)
- José Tomás Sánchez, D.D. (Sept.1976-Jan.1982)
- Ruben T. Profugo, D.D. (May 1982-Sept.2003)
- Emilio Z. Marquez, D.D. (May 2002-July 2017)
- Mel Rey Uy, D.D. (July 2017 – Present)

=== Act Director and School principal ===
- Sr. Robert Marie King, MM (1953–1955)
- Sr. Stephen Marie Wood, MM (nee Sister Cecelia Wood) (1956–1958)
- Sr. Carmen Eser (1959–1962)
- Sr. Joseph Aileen (nee Sister Patricia Maher, MM) (1962–1968)
- Sr. Ancilla Marie (1968–1973)
- Dr. Lourdes C. Glinoga (1976–2003)

=== Act School Director ===
- No Director/ Temporary VP for Academic Affairs (2003–2010)
- Rev. Fr. Edwin V. Baruelo(2011–2016)
- Rev. Fr. Renato D. Naca (2016–2018)
- Rev. Fr. Edilberto H. Jarapa (2018–2020)
- Rev. Fr. Allan Neil L. Laqueo (2020–present)
