= Reynaldo Evangelista =

21st-century bishop of Imus

The Most Reverend Reynaldo G. Evangelista OFS
- Bishop of Imus
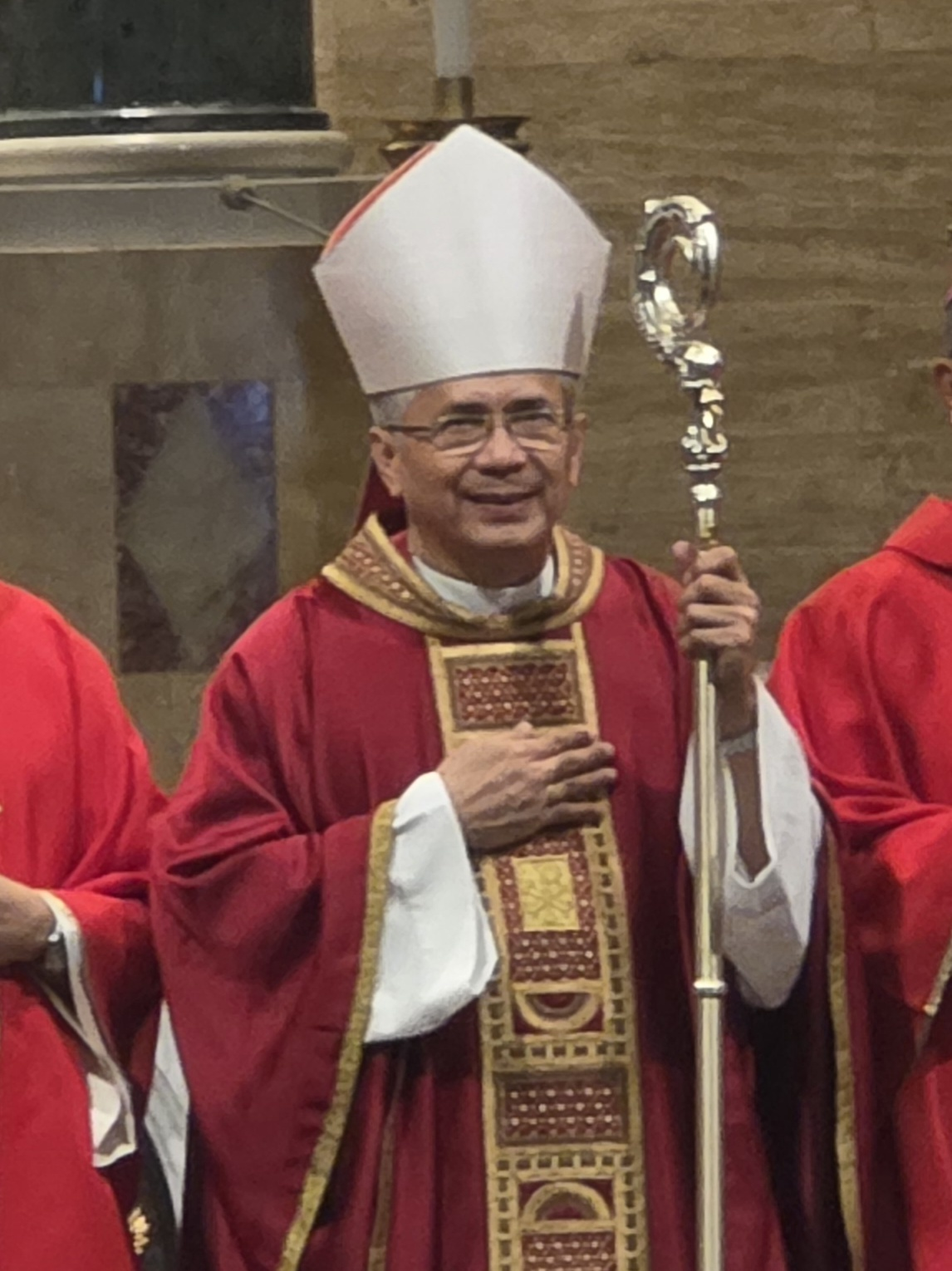
- Evangelista presiding over the Pope's Day 2026 Misa Mayor at the Manila Cathedral
- Church: Catholic Church
- Province: Manila
- See: Imus
- Appointed: April 8, 2013
- Installed: June 5, 2013
- Predecessor: Luis Antonio Tagle
- Successor: Incumbent
- Previous post: Bishop of Boac (2004–2013)

Orders
- Ordination: June 19, 1986 by Mariano Gaviola
- Consecration: January 26, 2005 by Antonio Franco

Personal details
- Born: Reynaldo Gonda Evangelista; May 8, 1960 (age 66) Mabini, Batangas, Philippines
- Denomination: Roman Catholic
- Parents: Benjamín C. Evangelista (father); Rufina G. Gonda (mother)
- Education: Saint Francis de Sales Regional College Seminary, Lipa City; Saint Alphonsus School of Theology, Lucena City
- Motto: Mitis Et Humilis Corde (Gentle and Humble of Heart)
- Coat of arms: Reynaldo G. Evangelista's coat of arms

Ordination history
History
Diaconal ordination
- Ordained by: Ruben T. Profugo, (Lucena)
Priestly ordination
- Ordained by: Mariano G. Gaviola, (Lipa)
Episcopal consecration
- Consecrated by: Antonio Franco, (Apostolic Nuncio to the Philippines)

Styles of Reynaldo G. Evangelista
- Reference style: His Excellency; The Most Reverend
- Spoken style: Your Excellency
- Religious style: Bishop

Reynaldo Gonda Evangelista OFS (born May 8, 1960) is a Filipino prelate and a professed member of the Franciscan Order who is the current bishop of the Roman Catholic Diocese of Imus appointed by Pope Francis on April 8, 2013, his first appointment in the Philippines. He replaced Bishop Luis Antonio Tagle after he was installed as the archbishop of Manila in December 2011. Evangelista was installed as the fifth bishop of Imus on June 5, 2013. He previously served as the third bishop of Boac in Marinduque province from December 11, 2004, until his appointment to Imus.

== Early life and family ==
Evangelista was born on May 8, 1960, in Brgy. San Jose in Mabini, Batangas province. His father, Benjamin C. Evangelista, of Brgy. San Jose, and his mother, Rufina G. Gonda, of Brgy. Talaga, both originated from Mabini, Batangas. Reynaldo is the fifth among the nine siblings: his only brother Antonio, and his seven sisters Teresita (Roga), Melba (del Espiritu Santo), Evelyn (Llanes), Gloria (Sanchez), Rosita (Atienza), Cecilia (Ferrer) and Lea (Aspi). His father died on January 18, 1983.

== Education ==
Evangelista attended primary school in 1967 at the Anilao Elementary School in Anilao, Batangas. He attended intermediate school in 1970 at the Mabini Central Elementary School. He went on to continue his high school education at the St. Francis de Sales Minor Seminary in Lipa City.

After high school, Evangelista entered the seminary in 1977 majoring in philosophy at the St. Francis de Sales Regional College Seminary in Brgy. Marawoy, Lipa City. He majored in theology in 1981 at the St. Alphonsus School of Theology in Lucena City in Quezon province. After his ordination in 1986, he took pastoral counseling in 1987 at the Summer Institute of the Ateneo de Manila University. He traveled in 1998 to Rome, Italy, to attend the course on Seminary Formation at the Pontifical Athenaeum Regina Apostolorum, During these studies he joined the Franciscan Order.

== Ordination ==
Evangelista was ordained a deacon on February 26, 1986, at the Carmel of St. Joseph Monastery in Lucena City by Ruben T. Profugo, bishop of Lucena. He was ordained a priest on June 19, 1986, at the San Sebastian Cathedral in Lipa City by Mariano G. Gaviola, archbishop of Lipa.

Evangelista was appointed bishop of Boac on December 11, 2004. On January 26, 2005, at the San Sebastian Cathedral in Lipa City, he was consecrated bishop by Antonio Franco, the apostolic nuncio to the Philippines. He was installed on February 22, 2005.

== Bishop of Imus ==
Evangelista was installed as the fifth bishop of Imus on June 5, 2013. The installation Mass was led by the Apostolic Nuncio to the Philippines, Archbishop Giuseppe Pinto, at the Imus Cathedral. The current Manila archbishop, Cardinal Luis Antonio Tagle, Evangelista's predecessor, along with Manila archbishop-emeritus Cardinal Gaudencio Rosales and Cebu archbishop-emeritus Cardinal Ricardo Vidal, were present.

== Ministries as a priest ==
- 1986-1995 – Professor at the St. Francis de Sales Minor Seminary in Lipa City
- 1986-1987 – Assistant prefect of discipline, St. Francis de Sales Minor Seminary, Lipa City
- 1987-1990 – Assistant spiritual director, St. Francis de Sales Minor Seminary, Lipa City
- 1987-1993 – Moderator, Association of Lipa Archdiocesan Seminarians
- 1988-1990 – Assistant director, Archdiocesan Youth Commission
- 1990-1991 – Vice rector, St. Francis de Sales Minor Seminary, Lipa City
- 1991-1995 – Rector, St. Francis de Sales Minor Seminary, Lipa City
- 1991-1995 – Ex officio member, Archdiocesan Council of Priests (Presbyteral Council)
- 1992-1997 – Member, Archdiocesan Board of Consultors
- 1994-2000 – Ordinary confessor, Missionary Catechists of the Sacred Heart (MCSH), Sabang, Lipa City
- 1995-2000 – Rector of St. Francis de Sales Regional College Seminary, Marawoy, Lipa City
- 1995-2000 – Ex officio member – Archdiocesan Council of Priests (Presbyteral Council)
- 1997 – Member, Commission on Clergy, Archdiocese of Lipa
- 1998 – Board member – Kapisanan ni San Francisco de Sales
- 1999 – Director – Kapisanan ni San Francisco de Sales
- 2000-2004 – Parish priest, San Guillermo Parish, Talisay, Batangas
- 2000-2004 – Director and chaplain, San Guillermo Academy, Talisay, Batangas
- 2001-2003 – Elected member of the Archdiocesan Council of Priests, Archdiocese of Lipa
- 2004 – Rector of St. Francis de Sales Regional College Seminary, Marawoy, Lipa City
- 2004 – Chairman of the Commission on Clergy, Archdiocese of Lipa
- 2004 – Elected member of the Archdiocesan Council of Priests, Archdiocese of Lipa

== Ministries as bishop ==
- 2005–present – Member of the Board of Trustees of St. Alphonsus Regional Seminary, Lucena City
- 2005–present – Honorary chairman of the Marinduque Council For Environmental Concerns (MACEC)
- 2005-2009 – Member of the Office on Women, Catholic Bishops' Conference of the Philippines (CBCP)
- 2005–present – Member of the Episcopal Commission on Seminaries, Catholic Bishops’ Conference of the Philippines (CBCP)
- 2009–present – Member of the Board of Directors of the Dechant Foundation in Dodge City, Kansas, US
- 2009-2011 – Member of the Episcopal Commission on Clergy, Catholic Bishops' Conference of the Philippines (CBCP)
- 2009–present – President of Commission on Vocations, Catholic Bishops' Conference of the Philippines (CBCP)
- 2011–present – Member of the Permanent Council, Catholic Bishops' Conference of the Philippines (CBCP)
- 2012–present – Member, Board of Trustees, Pondo ng Pinoy Community Foundation, Inc.

Catholic Church titles
Preceded by Luis Antonio Tagle	Roman Catholic Bishop of Imus; June 5, 2013–present	Incumbent
Preceded by Jose Francisco Oliveros	Roman Catholic Bishop of Boac; 2004–2013	Succeeded by Marcelino Antonio Maralit, Jr.
