= Tayabas Basilica =

Roman Catholic church in Quezon, Philippines

- Minor Basilica of St. Michael the Archangel and Diocesan Shrine of San Diego de Alcala
- Basílica Menor de San Miguel Arcángel y Santuario Diocesano de San Diego de Alcala (Spanish); Basilika Menor ni San Miguel Arkanghel at Pandiyosesis na Dambana ni San Diego de Alcala (Filipino)
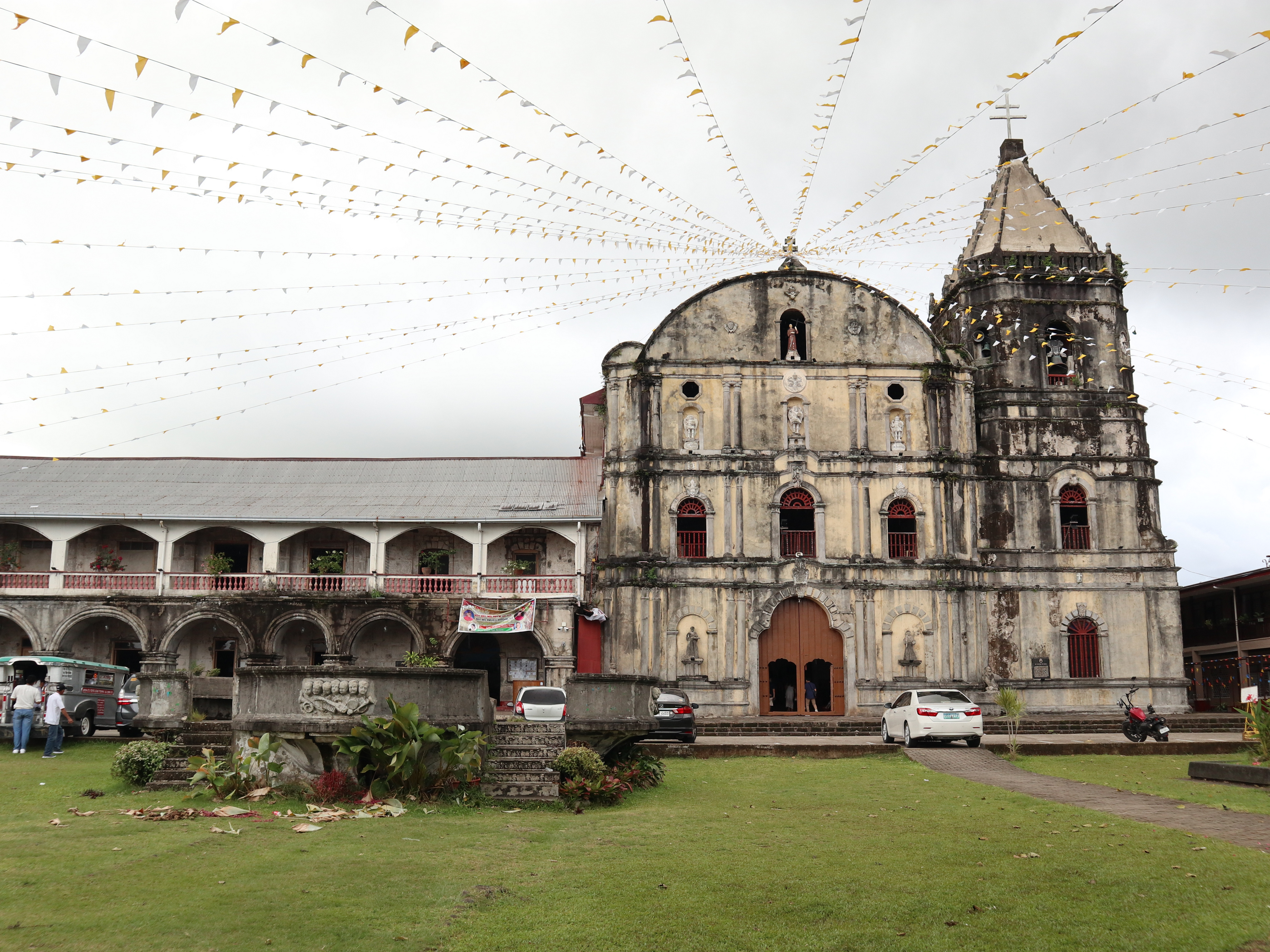
- The basilica from the church patio in 2022

- Location in Luzon Location in the Philippines
- 14°01′33″N 121°35′27″E
- Location: Tayabas, Quezon
- Country: Philippines
- Denomination: Roman Catholic

History
- Status: Minor Basilica and Diocesan Shrine
- Dedication: Michael the Archangel

Architecture
- Functional status: Active
- Heritage designation: National Cultural Treasure
- Designated: July 31, 2001
- Architectural type: Cruciform church
- Style: Baroque
- Completed: 1894

Administration
- Province: Lipa
- Metropolis: Lipa
- Archdiocese: Lipa
- Diocese: Lucena
- Deanery: Saint James
- Parish: Saint Michael the Archangel

Clergy
- Priest: Dennis M. Imperial

The Minor Basilica of Saint Michael the Archangel and Diocesan Shrine of San Diego de Alcala, commonly known as Tayabas Basilica, is a Roman Catholic basilica located in Tayabas, Quezon, Philippines, under the Diocese of Lucena. Its titular saint is Michael the Archangel, whose feast is celebrated every September 29.

Pope John Paul II raised the shrine to the status of Minor Basilica via his decree Angelos et Archangelos on 18 October 1988. The decree was signed and notarized by Cardinal Agostino Casaroli.

The Minor Basilica of Saint Michael the Archangel has been solemnly declared as the Diocesan Shrine of San Diego de Alcala on November 12, 2026, feast of its Second Patron, San Diego de Alcala by His Excellency, Most. Rev. Mel Rey M. Uy, D.D, Bishop of the Diocese of Lucena making its name into "Minor Basilica of Saint Michael the Archangel and Diocesan Shrine of San Diego de Alcala" and the First Diocesan Shrine in the Philippines dedicated to Saint Diego de Alcala.

The basilica is the largest in the province of Quezon; built in the shape of a key, it has the local moniker "Susì ng Tayabas" ("Key of Tayabas"). The church's 103-meter (338-foot) aisle is also one of the longest naves among the country’s Spanish colonial era churches.

== History ==
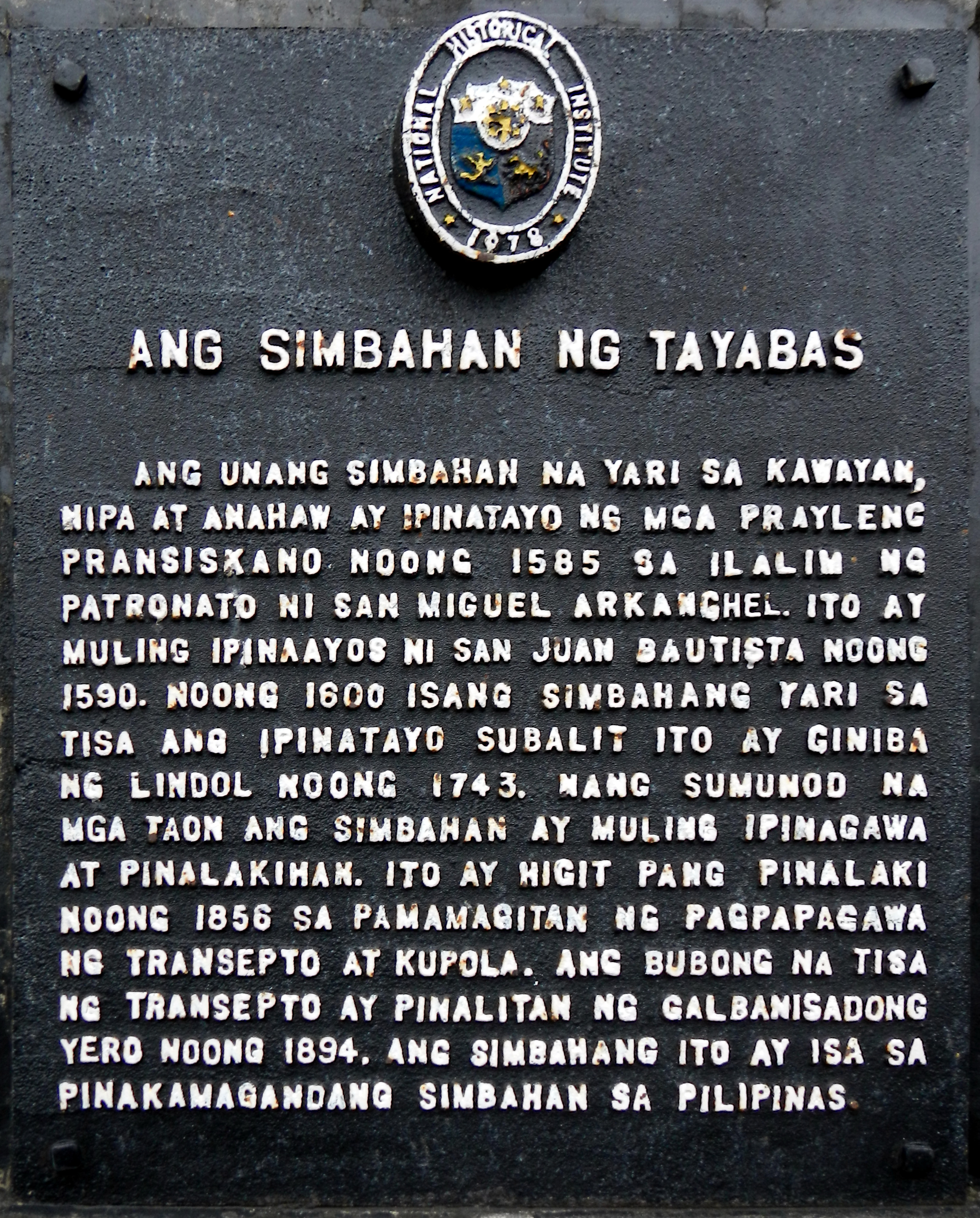
Church NHI historical marker installed in 1978

Catholicism in Tayabas was established in 1578 by Franciscan priests Juán Portocarrero de Plasencia and Diego de Oropesa de San José, known as the "Apostles of Laguna and Tayabas". In 1585, the town of Tayabas was established as a parish with Michael the Archangel as its patron saint. Like most churches in the Philippines during the Spanish colonial era, the first church was a camarin-type structure of bamboo, nipa and anahaw built in 1585 under the Franciscan friars.

The church was repaired under the supervision of Saint Pedro Bautista in 1590. In the same year, the Catholic Church obtained permission from the superior government to build the church using stone. Upon the order of Saint Pedro Bautista, leader of the Franciscans, the church was rebuilt in 1600 using bricks; this building was later destroyed by earthquake in 1743 earthquake, leaving only the walls standing. Due to the growing number of Catholics in Tayabas, the church was again rebuilt and extended. It was further expanded under the term of Benito de la Pila between 1856 and 1866 with the addition of the transept in the shape of a rotunda and cupola. The brick tile roof was replaced with galvanized iron sheets in 1894.

Manuel Gonzáles bought the administration building (casa administración) used by the provincial head of the Franciscans for 962 pesos in 1855. He donated it to the town to be used as classrooms to replace the old, ruined rooms. Gonzáles ordered the school's construction in 1878, using stone, lime and tiled roofing. Together with Samuel Mena, Gonzáles restored the old Tribunal built by Governor La O, which had been unused since it had burned down in 1877. From 1896 to 1899, Isabelo Martínez was the first native Filipino priest assigned to Tayabas Basilica, followed by Amando Alandy, a native of the town, from 1899 to 1900.

The church's patio played a significant role during the struggle of the Filipino revolutionaries against Spain. General Vicente Lukban and his troops received the surrender of the Spanish army on the patio on August 13, 1898, while the Philippine flag was waved from the church's belfry. During the Second World War, the church's convento was used as a garrison by the occupying Japanese Imperial Army.

The church was rededicated on March 14, 1987, by Rubén T. Profugo, Bishop of Lucena. On October 18, 1988, the church was raised to the rank of Minor Basilica by Pope John Paul II through the Congregation for Divine Worship and the Discipline of the Sacraments, and was proclaimed during Mass on January 21, 1989.

The Minor Basilica of Saint Michael the Archangel has been solemnly declared as the Diocesan Shrine of San Diego de Alcala on November 12, 2026, feast of its Second Patron, San Diego de Alcala by His Excellency, Most. Rev. Mel Rey M. Uy, D.D, Bishop of the Diocese of Lucena making its name into "Minor Basilica of Saint Michael the Archangel and Diocesan Shrine of San Diego de Alcala" and the First Diocesan Shrine in the Philippines dedicated to Saint Didacus of Alcalá.

Tayabas Basilica is considered to be one of the most beautiful churches in the Philippines. Through Presidential Decree No. 374, the National Museum of the Philippines declared Tayabas Basilica a National Cultural Treasure on July 31, 2001, along with 25 other churches nationwide.

== Features ==
The church at Tayabas is generally considered to be Baroque architecture. It is included in a list of more than 30 churches declared National Cultural Treasures by the National Museum of the Philippines.

=== Patio and façade ===
The influence of Chinese architecture in Tayabas is pronounced in the design of the basilica. Stone lions in front of the building show a link to the presence of Chinese traders before the Spanish colonial era. Cherubs in stone relief playing the lute, trombone, drum and trumpet can be seen. Its unusual, three-storey façade is almost eclectic, and was added during renovations to the church. The levels are separated by horizontal bands and images of angels and saints including Saint Francis of Assisi, Saint Dominic and Saint Diego of Alcalá. The bottom level of the façade is marked by the main doors flanked by two niches in Mudejar style, as well as the stone lions. The second level has the side and central windows of the choir loft, with sashes made with capiz shells. The topmost tier has stones statues of the Biblical archangels Michael, Gabriel and Raphael.

=== Floor plan ===
Tayabas Basilica has a unique floor plan that resembles a key. Because of this, the basilica is often referred to by locals as "Susì ng Tayabas" ("Key of Tayabas")

=== Aisle ===
Views of the Tayabas Basilica nave

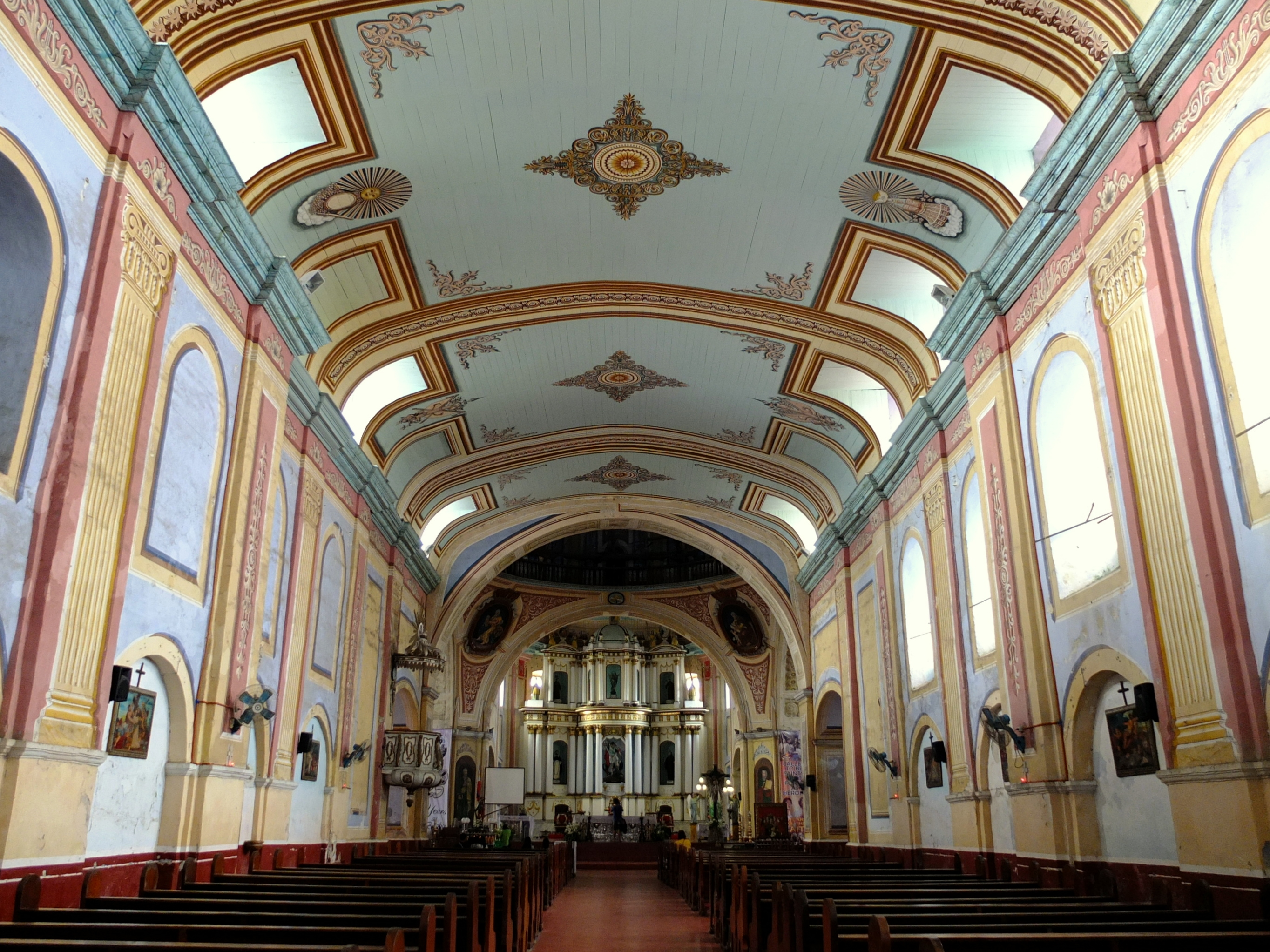
View from the basilica's entrance

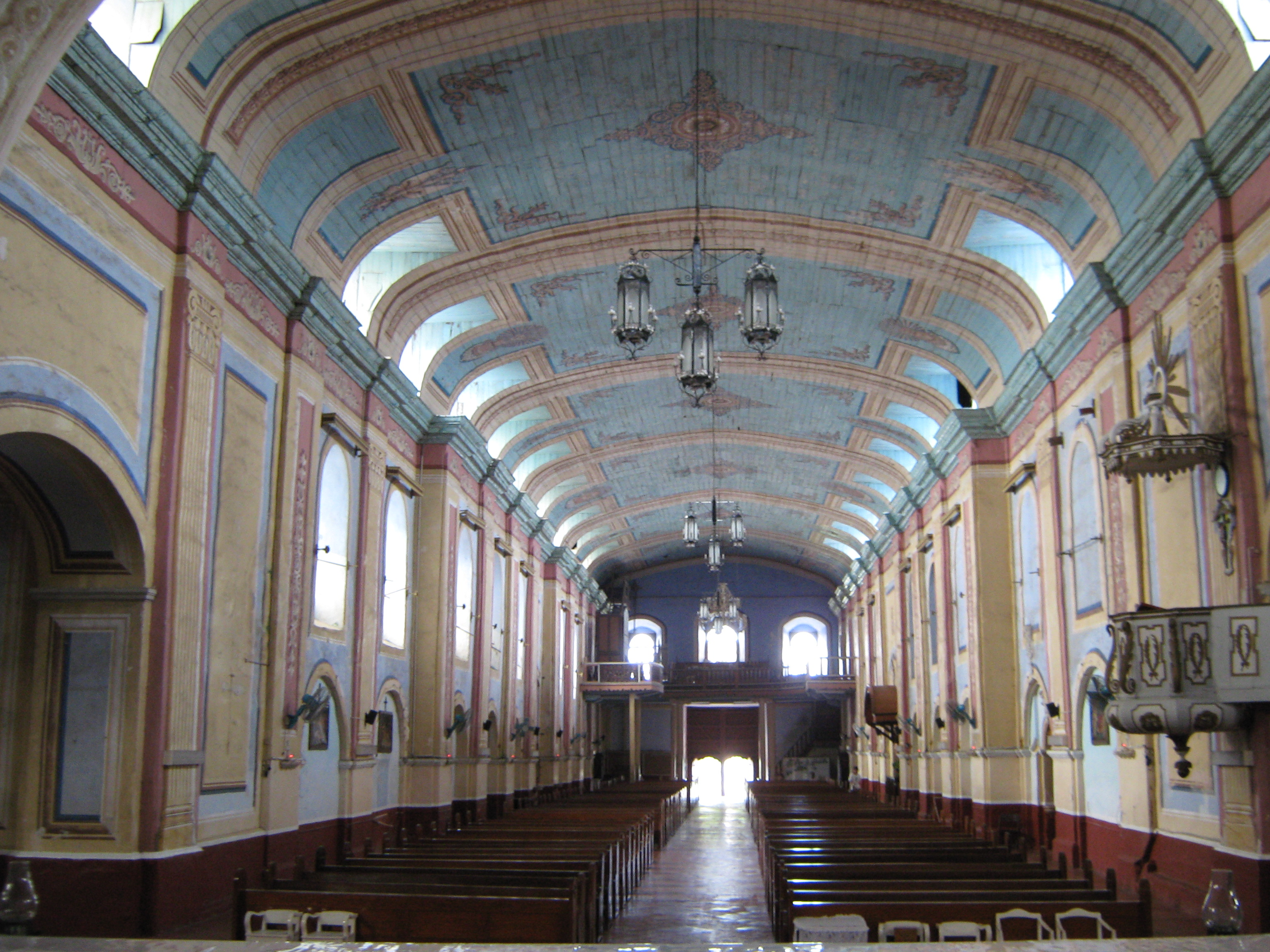
View from the altar

The church's 103 m (338 ft) aisle is the longest of any church built during the Spanish colonial era. It was built between 1855 and 1860.

=== Interior ===
The basilica interior is built in the Neo-Classical style, with seven altars. An image of the Nuestra Señora de los Ángeles ("Our Lady of Angels") is enshrined in the central retablo of the main altar. Severo Carpintero, known as the Maestro Carpintero ("Master Carpenter") built the church's round transept and crossing. The dome was built together with a third storey and semicircular pediment. It also has an antique organ located in the choir loft and a balcony over the altar. The basilica's ceiling painting was restored in the 1990s by Delfín Antiola.

=== Church clock ===
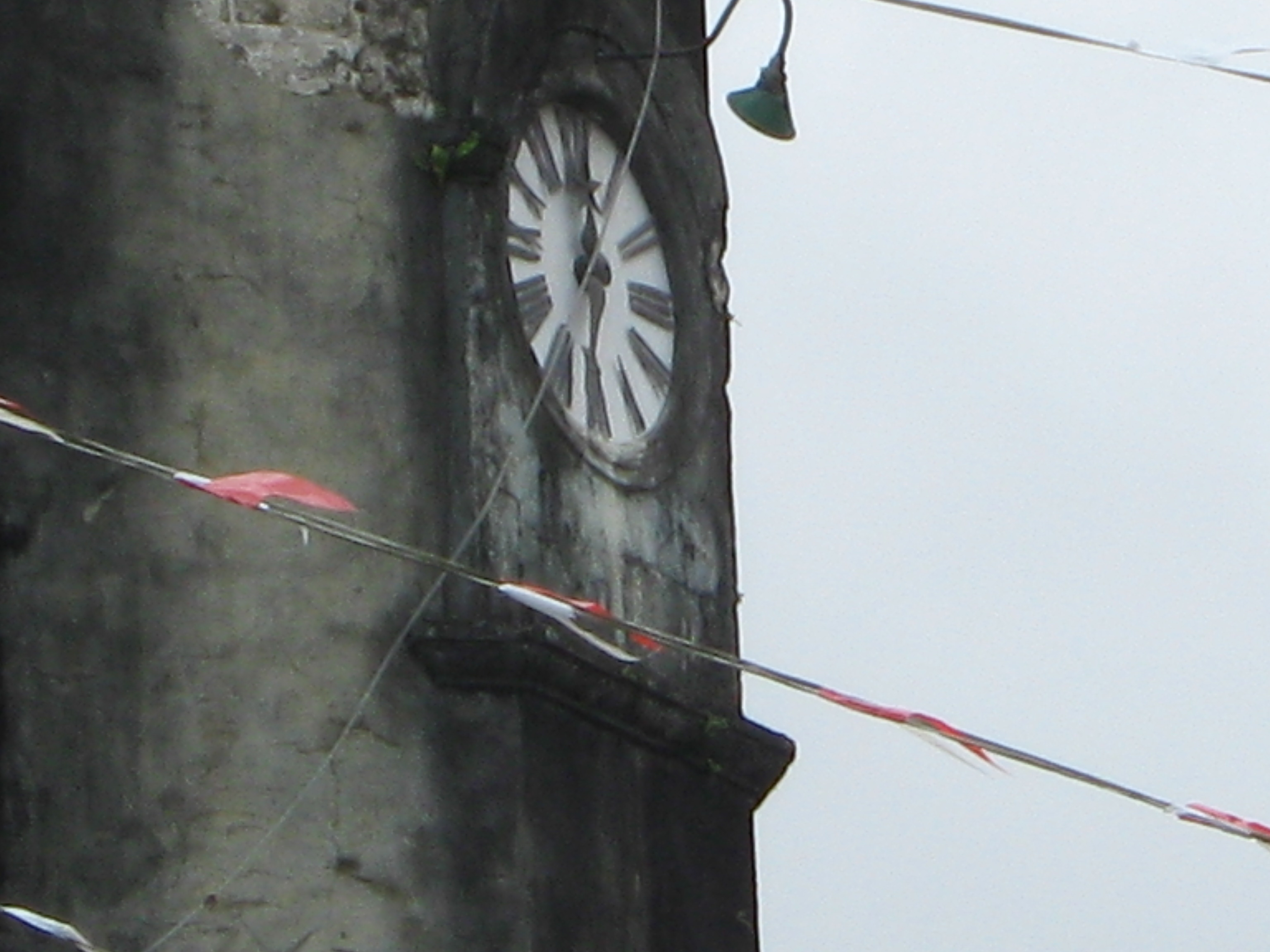
Church clock

The basilica's 18th-century clock was erected in early 1900 on the belfry; it is one of the oldest and largest church clocks in Asia. The clock is 0.5 m (1.6 ft) tall and has a circumference of 42 cm (1.38 ft). The hour and minute hands are 0.5 m (1.6 ft) and 62 cm (2.03 ft) long respectively. Running the clock are two weights connected by steel cable to the hour hand with a weight of 70 kg (150 lb) and 140 kg (310 lb) for the whole clock. The clock chimes once on the hour and half-hour. It was refurbished in 1971 during the term of Monsignor Gregorio Salvatus.

=== Ermita ===
Outbuildings of Tayabas Basilica

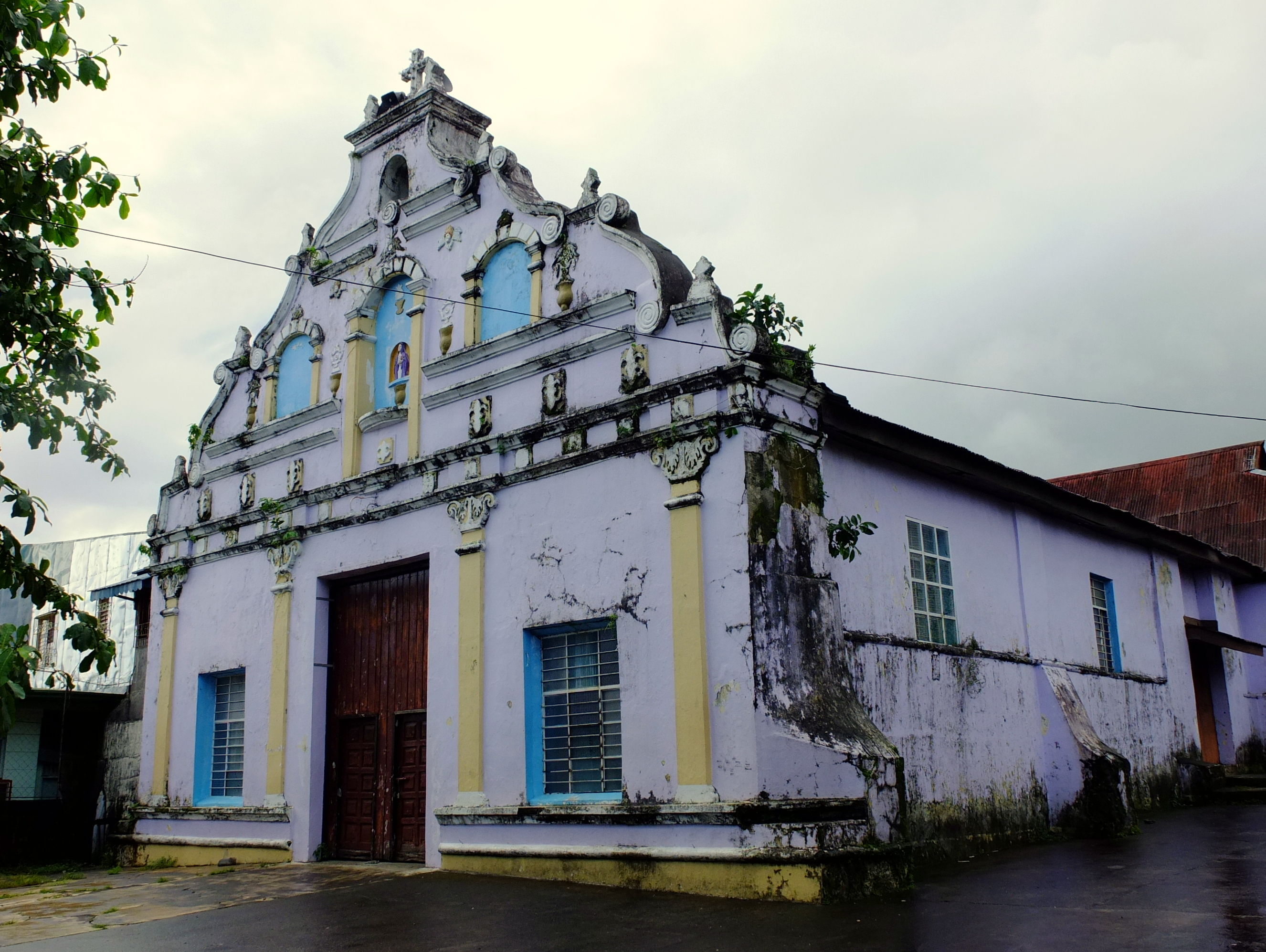
Ermita Church

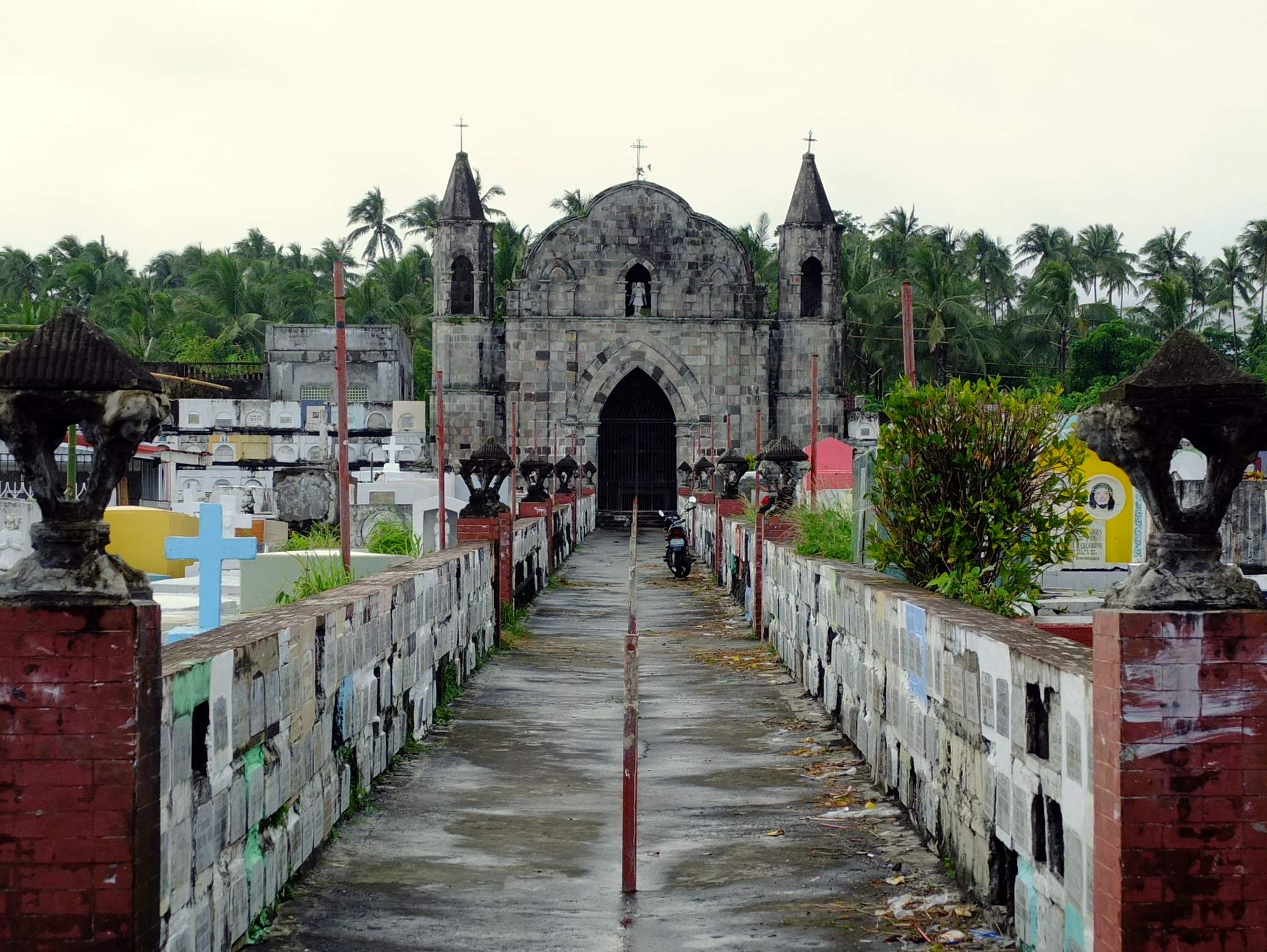
Tayabas Cemetery Mortuary Chapel

Tayabas Basilica has two ermita chapels dedicated to Nuestra Señora de las Angustias and to San Diego de Alcala.

=== Cemetery ===
The church has an old cemetery made of stone. A chapel with two towers was built in 1889 by Father Samuel Mena. The cemetery was closed when the barrio of Cota (now Lucena) became a town.

== Restorations ==
In 2000, the church underwent major renovations and restorations for the sixth time. The altar was moved from the northern apse to the crossing of the apse below the dome. The church's pulpit and the basilica's monastery were also restored. Fund-raising activities to pay for the restoration of the basilica in preparation for the church's 25th anniversary as a minor basilica in 2014 were done since June 2009.

In 2011, an estimated gross area of 1,798.43 m^{2} (19,358.1 sq ft) on the church's roof and roof framework was repaired and restored with the help of the National Museum. In 2011, the lighting of the façade was converted to solar energy using photovoltaic power panels and other devices. It is the first old church in the Philippines to use solar energy in its façade.

== Administration ==
Tayabas Basilica is in the jurisdiction of the Vicariate of St. James of the Diocese of Lucena. Reverend Monsignor Dennis Imperial, PC, serves as parish priest and Rector with Father Jhillmar Jalbuena and Father John C. Añago parochial vicars and Fr. Jose Fernando Defante as Resident Priest.

== Festivities ==
Tayabas town is also known for its religious activities, the most important of which is the feast of Saint Michael the Archangel, the town's patron saint who is celebrated annually on September 29. The town also celebrates the Viernes Dolores de Turumba in honor of the Our Lady of Sorrows of Turumba, who is celebrated with dance, chanting and a procession. On Holy Week, a stage play depicting the passion and death of Jesus Christ can be viewed on the church patio. The play including the procession of poon – wooden statues.

== In popular media ==
- The music video of Donna Cruz's Jubilee Song was filmed in the interior of the basilica.

== Bibliography ==
- Huerta, Felix de (1865). Estado geográfico, topográfico, estadístico, histórico-religioso: de la santa y apostólica provincia de S. Gregorio Magno, de religiosos Menores descalzos de la regular y más estrecha observancia de N.S.P.S. Francisco, en las Islas Filipinas: comprende el número de religiosos, conventos, pueblos, situación de estos, años de su fundación, tributos, almas, producciones, industrias, cosas y casos especiales de su administración espiritual, en el archipiélago filipino, desde su fundación en el año de 1577 hasta el de 1865 [Geographical, topographical, statistical, historical and religious state of the holy and apostolic province of S. Gregorio Magno] (in Spanish). Binondo: Imprenta de M. Sanchez y Ca.
