= Antonio Racelis Rañola =

Filipino Roman Catholic bishop (born 1932)

Most Reverend Antonio Racelis Rañola
- Auxiliary Bishop Emeritus of Cebu
- Church: Roman Catholic
- Province: Cebu
- Appointed: 24 February 1990
- Term ended: 2 October 2003
- Other post: Titular Bishop of Claternae (1990–present)

Orders
- Ordination: 26 March 1956
- Consecration: 4 April 1990 by Bruno Torpigliani, Ruben T. Profugo and Angel Lagdameo

Personal details
- Born: Antonio Racelis Rañola; 16 May 1932 (age 94) Manila, Philippines
- Motto: Verbum Christi Habitet
- Coat of arms

Antonio Racelis Rañola (born 16 May 1932) is a Filipino Roman Catholic prelate, who served as an Auxiliary Bishop of the Archdiocese of Cebu from 1990 until his retirement in 2003.

== Biography ==
Antonio Rañola was born in Manila on 16 May 1932. He was ordained a priest for the Diocese of Lucena on 26 March 1956. Prior to his appointment as a bishop, he served as the private secretary at the Apostolic Nunciature to the Philippines.

On 24 February 1990, Pope John Paul II appointed him Titular Bishop of Claternae and Auxiliary Bishop of Cebu. He received his episcopal consecration on 4 April 1990 from Archbishop Bruno Torpigliani, with Bishops Ruben T. Profugo and Angel Lagdameo serving as co-consecrators.

During his tenure in the Archdiocese of Cebu, Rañola assisted the Archbishop in the pastoral governance of one of the largest ecclesiastical jurisdictions in the Philippines. He was particularly involved in the administration of various diocesan commissions.

On 2 October 2004, Pope John Paul II accepted his resignation from the office of auxiliary bishop upon Rañola before he reaching the mandatory retirement age of 75. Since his retirement, he has held the title of Auxiliary Bishop Emeritus of Cebu while residing in Cebu City.

== See also ==
- Historical list of the Catholic bishops of the Philippines
