= Emilio Z. Marquez =

Filipino Catholic bishop (born 1941)

The Most Reverend Emilio Z. Marquez D.D., JCL, SThD
- Bishop Emeritus of Lucena
- Bishop Marquez
- Province: Lipa
- See: Lucena
- Appointed: May 4, 2002
- Installed: November 4, 2003
- Retired: July 29, 2017
- Predecessor: Ruben T. Profugo
- Successor: Mel Rey Uy
- Previous posts: Co-Adjutor Bishop of Lucena (2002-2003); Bishop of Gumaca (1984-2002)

Orders
- Ordination: June 6, 1964 by Alfredo Obviar
- Consecration: January 29, 1985 by Bruno Torpigliani

Personal details
- Born: Emilio Zurbano Marquez; May 28, 1941 (age 85) Lopez, Tayabas, Commonwealth of the Philippines
- Denomination: Roman Catholic
- Education: Mount Carmel Seminary, Sariaya, Quezon; UST Central Seminary, Lucena City; Faculdad Teologica del Norte de España, Burgos, Spain; Angelicum University, Rome, Italy; Lateran University, Rome, Italy
- Motto: "Nomen Domini Invocabo" (I will call on the name of the Lord)
- Coat of arms: Emilio Z. Marquez's coat of arms

Styles of Emilio Marquez
- Reference style: His Excellency; The Most Reverend
- Spoken style: Your Excellency
- Religious style: Bishop

Emilio Zurbano Marquez (born May 28, 1941) is a Filipino bishop of the Roman Catholic Church who served as the fourth bishop of Diocese of Lucena. He previously served as the first Bishop of Gumaca in Quezon province from January 29, 1985, until his appointment as Coadjutor Bishop of Lucena and Apostolic Administrator of Gumaca on May 4, 2002. After the resignation of Bishop Ruben T. Profugo in 2003, Bishop Marquez was installed as the fourth Bishop of Lucena on November 4, 2003. He was also the chairman and CEO of Mount Carmel Diocesan General Hospital in Lucena City, Quezon. Marquez retired as Bishop of Lucena on July 29, 2017, upon reaching the canonical retirement age of 75. Pope Francis accepted his resignation and appointed Bishop Mel Rey Uy, then the economer of the Diocese of Romblon, as his successor.

== Early life and education ==
Marquez was born on May 28, 1941, in Lopez, Tayabas (now Quezon). He completed his elementary education at Lopez Elementary School and attended high school at Our Lady of Mount Carmel Seminary in Tayabas. He pursued philosophical and theological studies at the University of Santo Tomas Central Seminary in Manila. Furthering his education, he undertook postgraduate studies in theology at the Universidad Teológica del Norte de España in Burgos, Spain, and at the Angelicum University in Rome, Italy. He also obtained a Licentiate in Canon Law from the Lateran University in Rome.

== Priesthood ==
Marquez was ordained a priest on June 6, 1964, by Bishop Alfredo Ma. Obviar. He served in various capacities, including as a professor and later vice rector at Mount Carmel Seminary in Sariaya, Quezon. He also held the position of rector at St. Alphonsus School of Theology in Lucena and served as a parish priest in Pagbilao, Quezon.

== Episcopal ministry ==
On December 15, 1984, Marquez was appointed as the first Bishop of the newly established Diocese of Gumaca and was consecrated on January 29, 1985, by Archbishop Bruno Torpigliani. He served in Gumaca until May 4, 2002, when he was appointed Coadjutor Bishop of Lucena and Apostolic Administrator of Gumaca.

Following the resignation of Bishop Ruben T. Profugo in 2003, Marquez was installed as the fourth Bishop of Lucena on November 4, 2003.

He was a staunch advocate of social justice and frequently spoke out against illegal gambling and human rights abuses in the province, calling on government officials to implement ethical leadership.

He retired on July 29, 2017, and was succeeded by Bishop Mel Rey Uy.

== Legacy ==
As Bishop Emeritus, Marquez continues to provide spiritual guidance and remains active in church affairs. In 2024, he celebrated the 60th anniversary of his priestly ordination, marking a significant milestone in his lifelong dedication to the Church. He is one of the co-consecrators of Boac Bishop Edwin Panergo.

Catholic Church titles
New diocese	Bishop of Gumaca; January 29, 1985 – May 4, 2002	Succeeded by Buenaventura Famadico
Preceded by Ruben T. Profugo	Bishop of Lucena; November 4, 2003 – July 29, 2017 (Coadjutor: May 4, 2002 – September 13, 2003)	Succeeded by Mel Rey Uy
