= Lucena Cathedral =

Roman Catholic church in Lucena, Philippines

- Saint Ferdinand Cathedral
- Parokyang Katedral ni San Fernando (Filipino); Parroquia Catedral de San Fernando (Spanish)
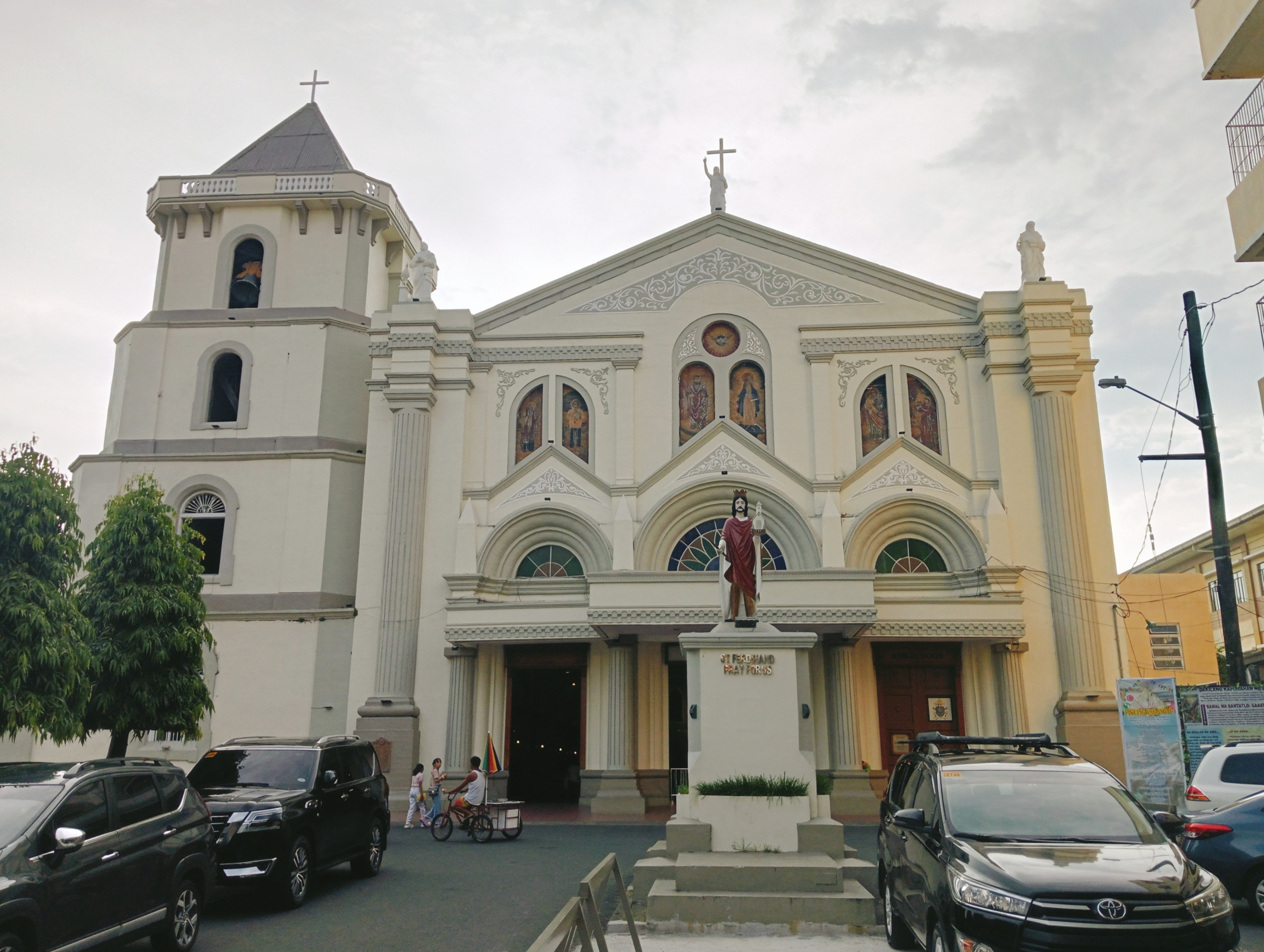
- Cathedral facade in 2023

- Location in Luzon Location in the Philippines
- 13°56′09″N 121°36′44″E
- Location: Lucena, Quezon
- Country: Philippines
- Denomination: Roman Catholic

History
- Former name: La Parroquial Catedral de Lucena (Spanish)
- Status: Cathedral
- Founded: 1881
- Dedication: Saint Ferdinand
- Consecrated: 1881, 1884

Architecture
- Functional status: Active
- Architectural type: Church building
- Style: Baroque
- Groundbreaking: 1882
- Completed: 1884, 1887

Administration
- Province: Lipa
- Metropolis: Lipa
- Archdiocese: Lipa
- Diocese: Lucena

Clergy
- Archbishop: Gilbert Armea Garcera
- Bishop: Mel Rey Uy

Saint Ferdinand Cathedral, commonly known as Lucena Cathedral, is a Roman Catholic cathedral in the city of Lucena, Quezon, Philippines. The seat of the Bishop of Lucena, it is dedicated to Saint Ferdinand III of Castile, a 13th century monarch who reigned in parts of modern-day Spain. The cathedral is situated at Barangay 5 (Poblacion), in the city proper of Lucena.

== History ==
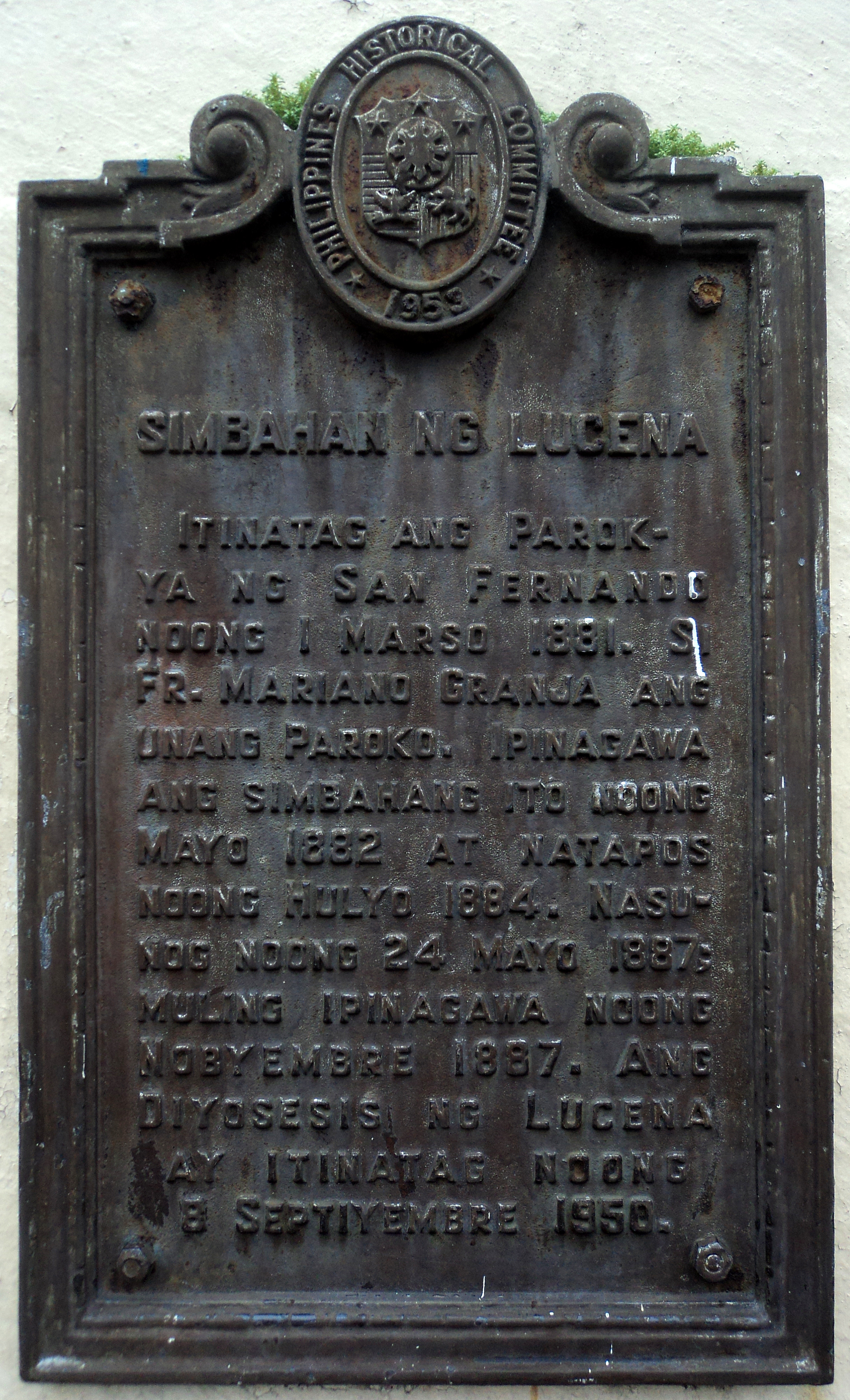
Church PHC historical marker installed in 1953

The parish of Saint Ferdinand in Lucena traces its roots to its first parish priest, Franciscan friar Fray Mariano Granja, when he himself made a proposal to establish a separate town and parish from Tayabas, where he was serving as parish priest before being transferred to Lucena. The proposal was sought by the principalias from the barrios of Cotta, Iyam Silangan, Ilayang Dupay, Ibabang Dupay, Gulang-gulang and other smaller barrios. On March 1, 1881, the decree establishing the parish of Lucena was released by Casimiro Herrero Pérez, then bishop of Caceres. The first church, which was made of half masonry and half wood, was constructed from May 1882 until July 1884 through the savings of Fr. Granja. However, this was damaged by a typhoon a few years later. On May 24, 1887, a fire razed the church, and in the same year, the convent of wood and masonry was also charred by fire. The church and convent were reconstructed in November 1887 and by Fr. Teodoro Fernandez in 1891, respectively. Aside from the church, Fr. Granja is also credited for the construction and founding of the following: the tribunal made of stone and wood, cemetery made of stone, a primary school for boys and girls built with wooden planks, a Franciscan tertiary women-managed hospital, and a college for women, which were all likewise funded by his incomes and stipends while serving in Tayabas. Under the helm of Msgr. Pedrito Baldovino, a new convent adjacent to the cathedral was built. During the terms of Msgr. Oscar Leaño and Msgr. Leandro Castro, the Bishop Alfredo Maria Obviar Building and the Edificio de San Fernando were constructed, respectively. The parish of Lucena became a cathedral when the eponymous diocese was founded in 1950.

== Gallery ==
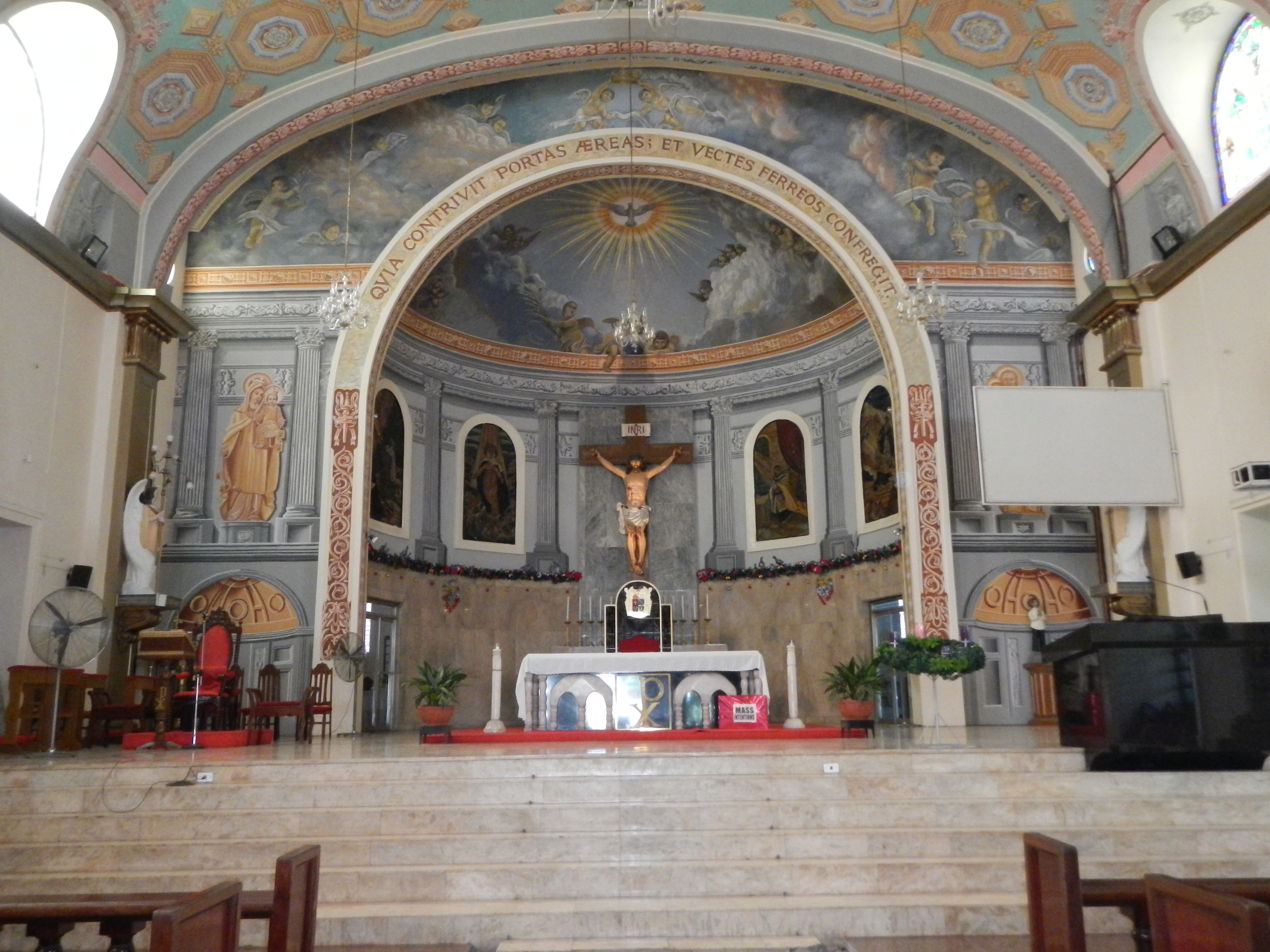
Cathedral altar

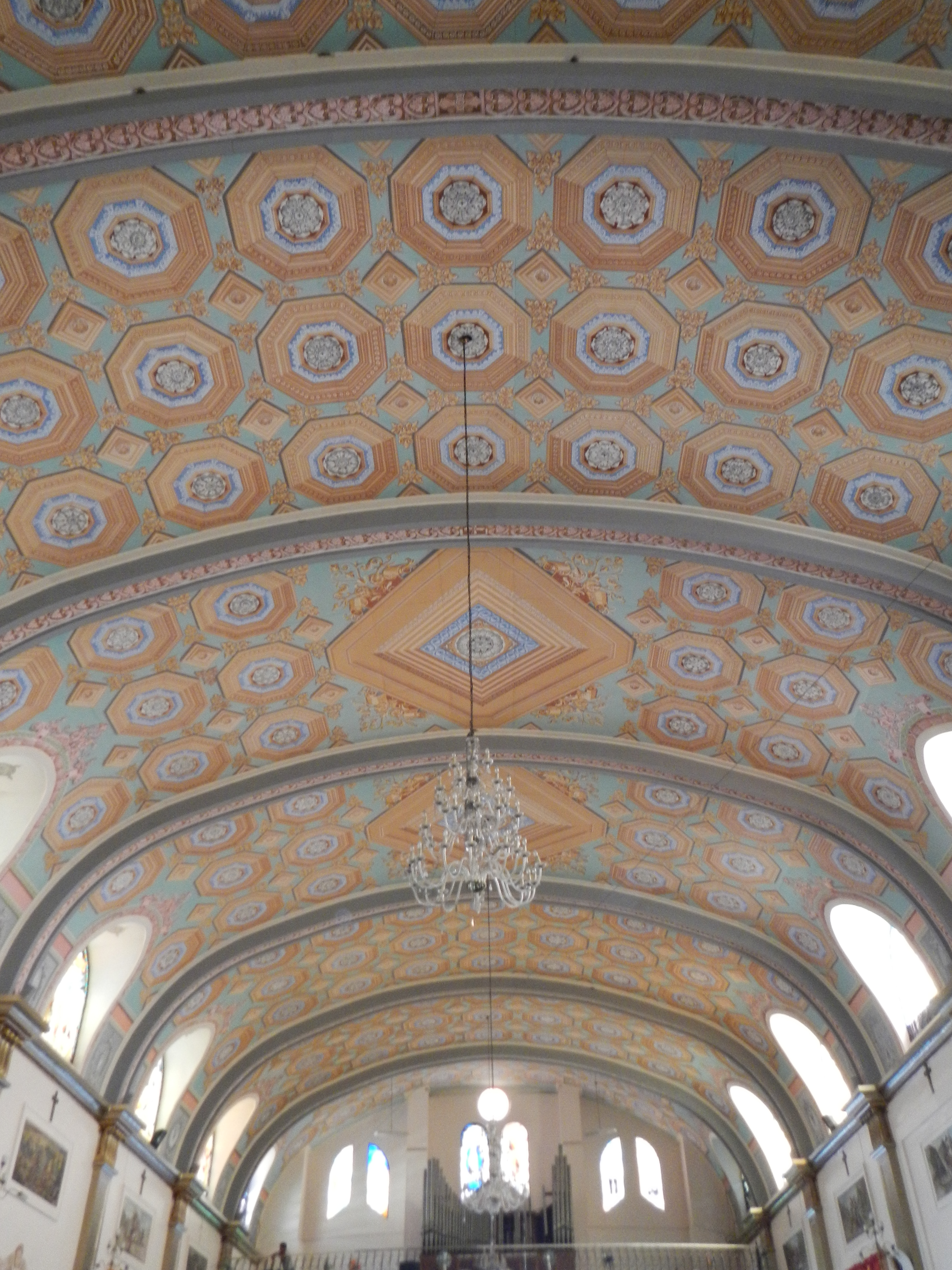
Cathedral ceiling view towards the choir loft

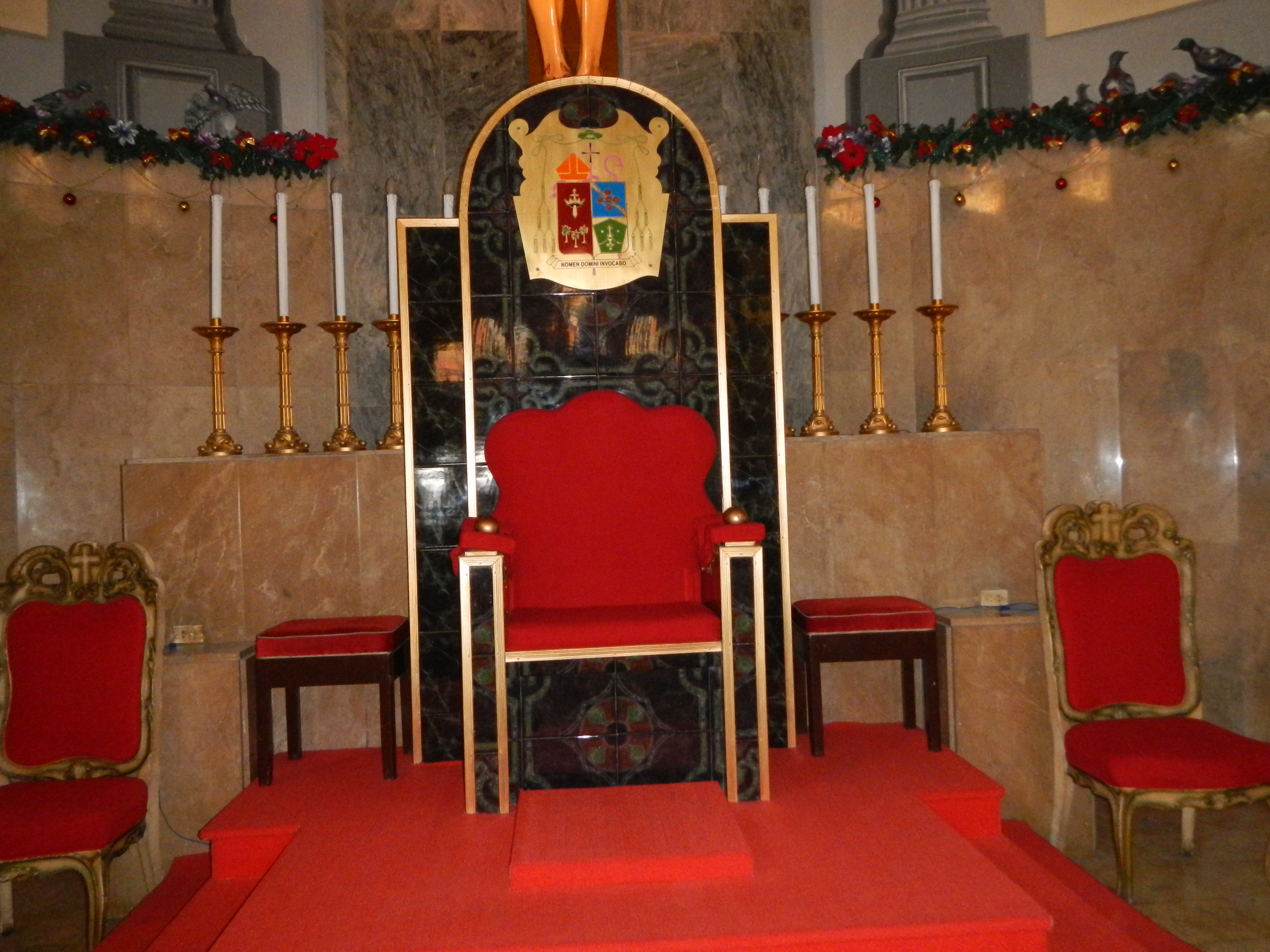
The bishop's cathedra

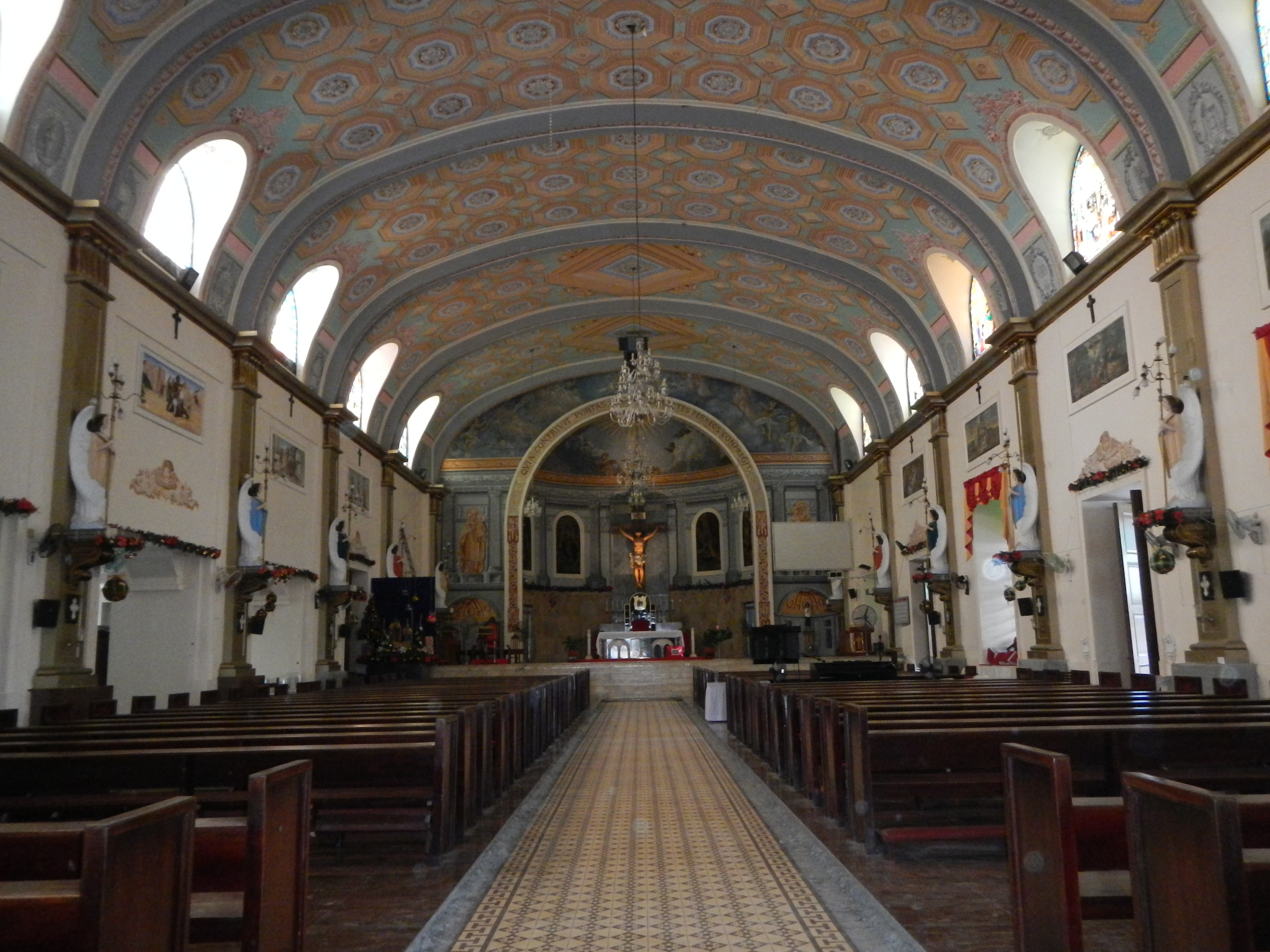
The cathedral's nave in 2013

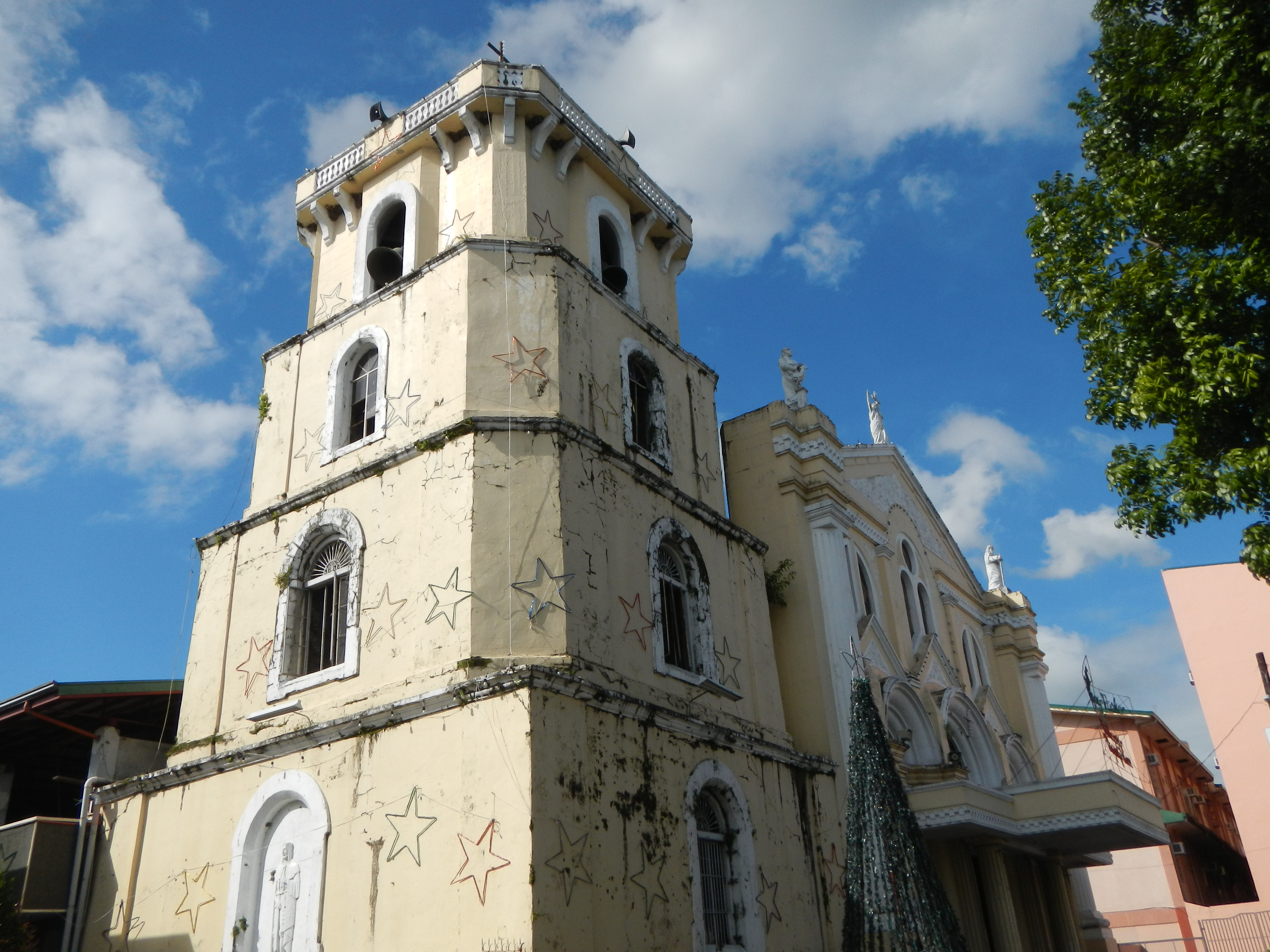
Cathedral belfry
