= Dominican Academy (Unisan, Quezon) =

Roman Catholic school in Quezon, Philippines

Location
- Quezon Ave. Brgy. Rajah Soliman; Unisan, Quezon 4305; Philippines
- Coordinates: 13°50′35″N 121°58′39″E

Information
- Type: Private, Non-sectarian
- Motto: "Laudare, Benedicere, Praedicare" (To Praise, To Bless, To Preach)
- Religious affiliation: Roman Catholic
- Patron saint: St. Dominic de Guzman
- Established: 1948
- Founder: Rev. Fr. Jose Salvania
- Principal: Sr. Rosario G. Diasnes, O.P.
- Chaplain: Rev. Fr. Jose I. Cantos II
- Faculty: 15
- Grades: Kindergarten 1 & 2, Elementary, Junior and Senior High School: STEM, HUMSS, & ABM
- Education system: K-12
- Colors: Blue, White and Yellow
- Slogan: "Contemplata Aliis Tradere"
- Song: Dominican Hymn
- Athletics: Basketball, Track, Badmenton, and Volleyball
- Sports: Basketball, Table Tennis, Track, Badmenton, Dance, Sepak, Chess, and Volleyball
- Nickname: DA
- Accreditation: Lucena Diocese Catholic School Association
- Newspaper: DA Sentinel
- Communities served: Dominicans - Order of the Preachers

The Dominican Academy in Unisan, Quezon, formerly known as Holy Child Jesus Institute, is a private, non-sectarian Roman Catholic School and a Filipino Dominican institution known in the Unisan academy. Founded in February 1948, by Jose Salvania, Parish Priest of St. Peter the Apostle Parish, it is one of the town's oldest schools.

== History ==
In 1948, Jose Salvania established the Holy Child Jesus Institute of Gumaca, Quezon. Its main aim was to give hope to young boys and girls as they started their formal education. During that time, no local schools offered a secondary education. This encouraged Father Salvania to open an extension of the Holy Child Jesus Institute in Unisan, Quezon, with the aim to help them prepare for their destiny, which he believed was a union with God.

Mayor Arturo Constantino’s residence in the town served as grounds for the school. Armando Altea became the Administrator, and Poiquinta Vargas worked as Registrar and Treasurer.

Salvania purchased a lot at Brgy, Rajah Soliman, in 1952, and built a two-story building. Cecilio Putong, then Secretary of the Department of Education, signed an award, Government Recognition #189, for the Holy Child Jesus Institute on March 19, 1953. In 1957, Fr. Jose Salvania turned over the administration of the institution to the Religious Missionaries of St. Dominic. Sr. Ma. Lourdes Moraleda, O.P., stood as the school's first Dominican Director.

In 1968 the Holy Child Jesus Institute was renamed the Dominican Academy in honor of its founder, St. Dominic de Guzman. Sr. Immaculada Resultan, O.P., served as the Director. Chaplains or parish priests in Unisan were the co-workers of the Dominican Sisters. They ensured the moral and spiritual groundwork and the continued existence of the school in the local community.

== The School Seal ==
The school seal is the Seal of the Dominican Order encased in the legend "Dominican Academy Unisan Quezon." It is a cross on a shield with a star on top. The shield is surrounded by the words LAUDARE, BENEDICERE and PRAEDICARE.
