= Atimonan Church =

Roman Catholic church in Quezon, Philippines

- Our Lady of the Angels Parish Church
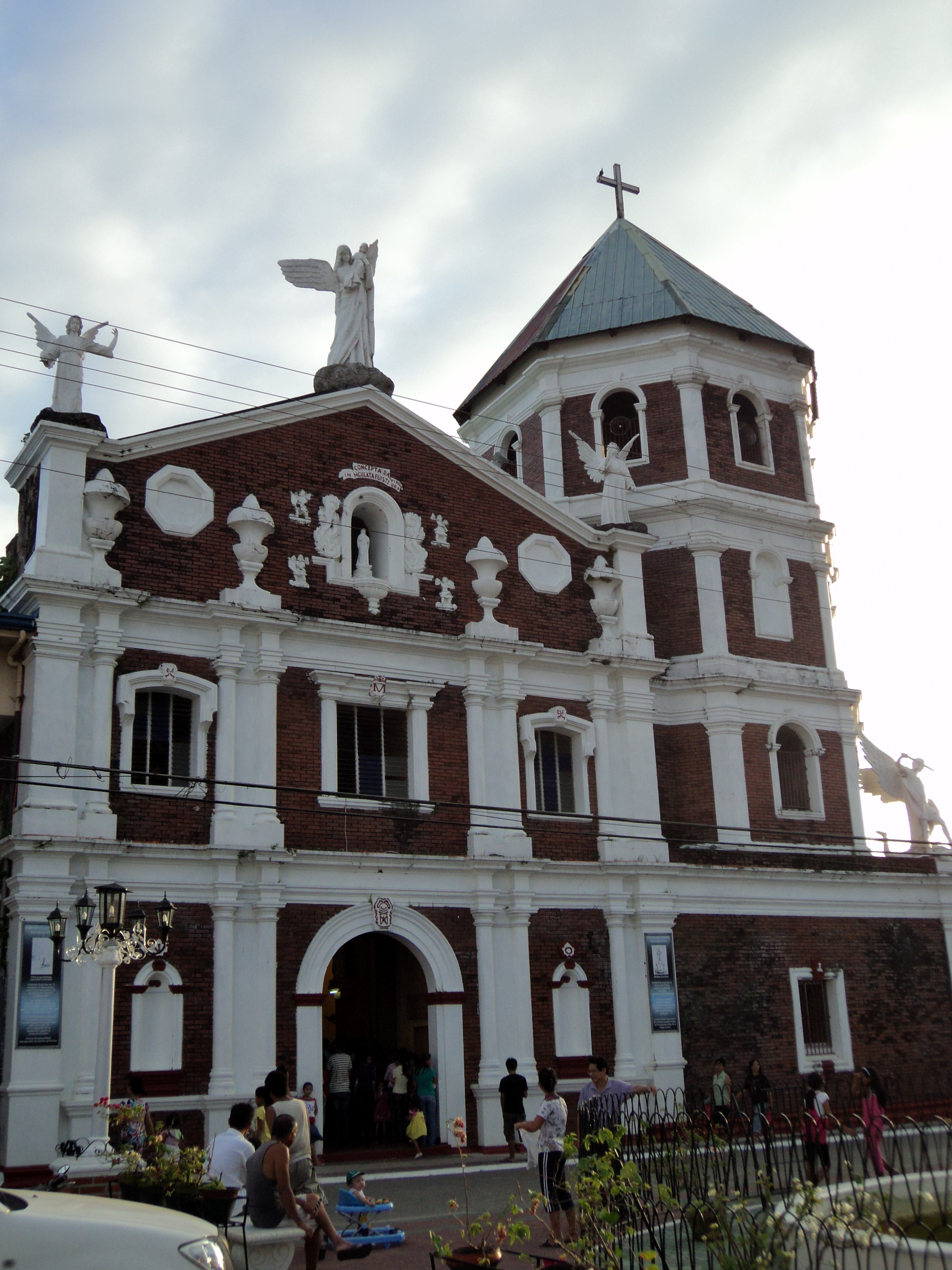
- Church facade in 2010

- Location in Luzon Location in the Philippines
- 14°0′4.68″N 121°55′17.22″E
- Location: Atimonan, Quezon
- Country: Philippines
- Denomination: Roman Catholic

History
- Status: Parish church
- Dedication: Mary

Architecture
- Functional status: Active
- Heritage designation: National Historical Landmark
- Designated: 1939
- Architectural type: Church building
- Completed: 1700; 326 years ago

Administration
- Diocese: Lucena

Our Lady of the Angels Parish Church, commonly known as Atimonan Church, is a Roman Catholic church located in Atimonan, Quezon, Philippines. It is under the jurisdiction of the Diocese of Lucena.

The first church was destroyed by the Dutch invaders in 1640. The present church was completed in 1700, but was seriously damaged by an earthquake in 1937. The National Historical Commission of the Philippines declared the church a national historical landmark in 1939.

== List of parish priests ==
- Rev. Msgr. Sergio L. Cuvin, HP – (1983–1989)
- Rev. Msgr. Juanito Claudio, HP - (1989–1996)
- Rev. Msgr. Froilan A. Zalameda, PC, JCL - (1996–2000)
- Rev. Msgr. Dennis M. Imperial, PC – (2000–2003)
- Rev. Msgr. Noe L. Loredo, PC, EV – (2003–2009)
- Rev. Msgr. Melecio "Boy" V. Verastigue, PC, EV – (2009–2015)
- Rev. Msgr. Emmanuel "Noel" Ma. L. Villareal, PC, EV, SThL, MA – (2015–2021)
- Rev. Fr. Rolando "Rolly" A. Marasigan – (2021–2024)
- Rev. Msgr. Eugenio Antonio “Tony” A. Viray, PC, VF – February 10, 2024, to the present.

== Gallery ==
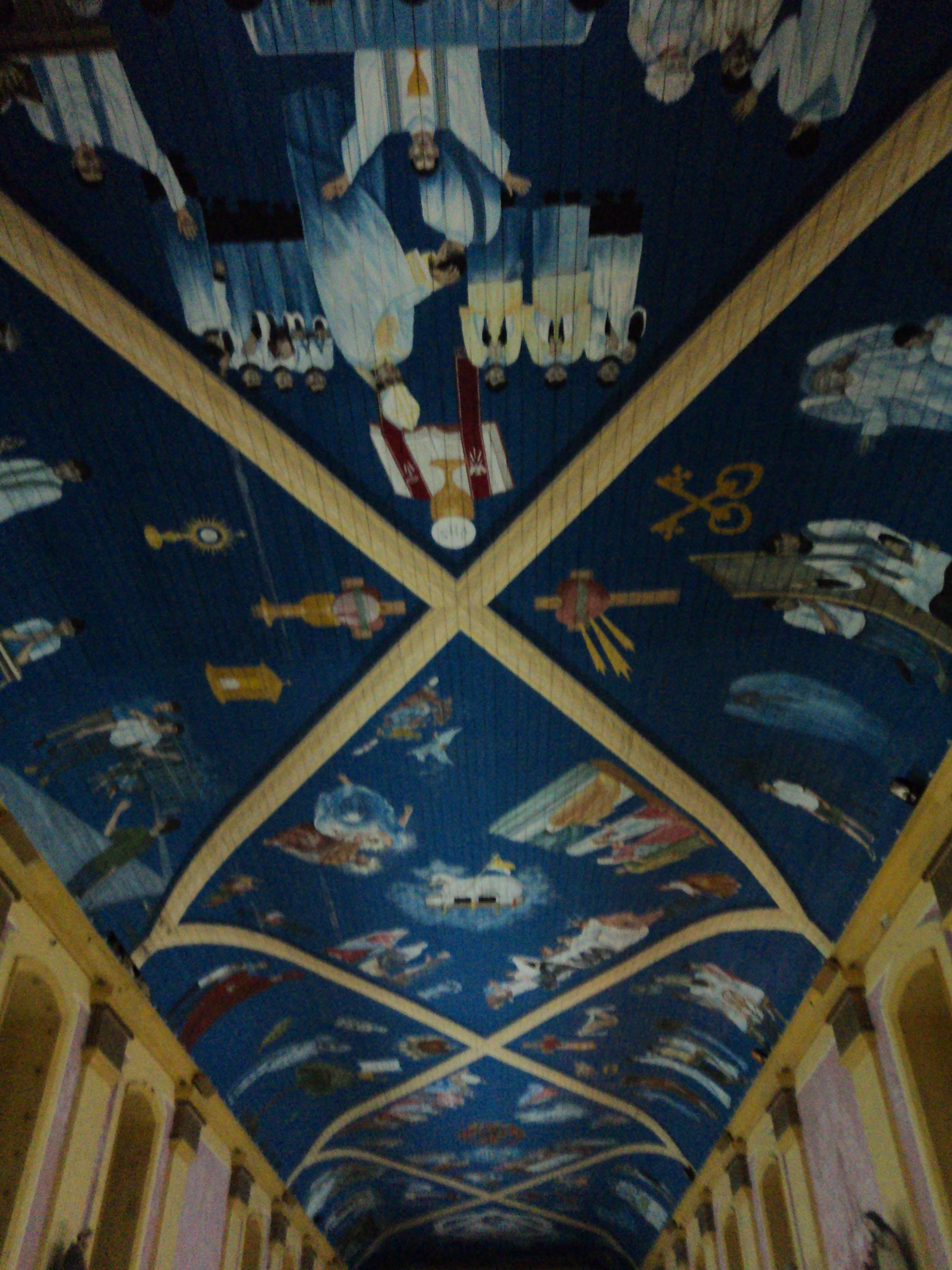
Church's ceiling

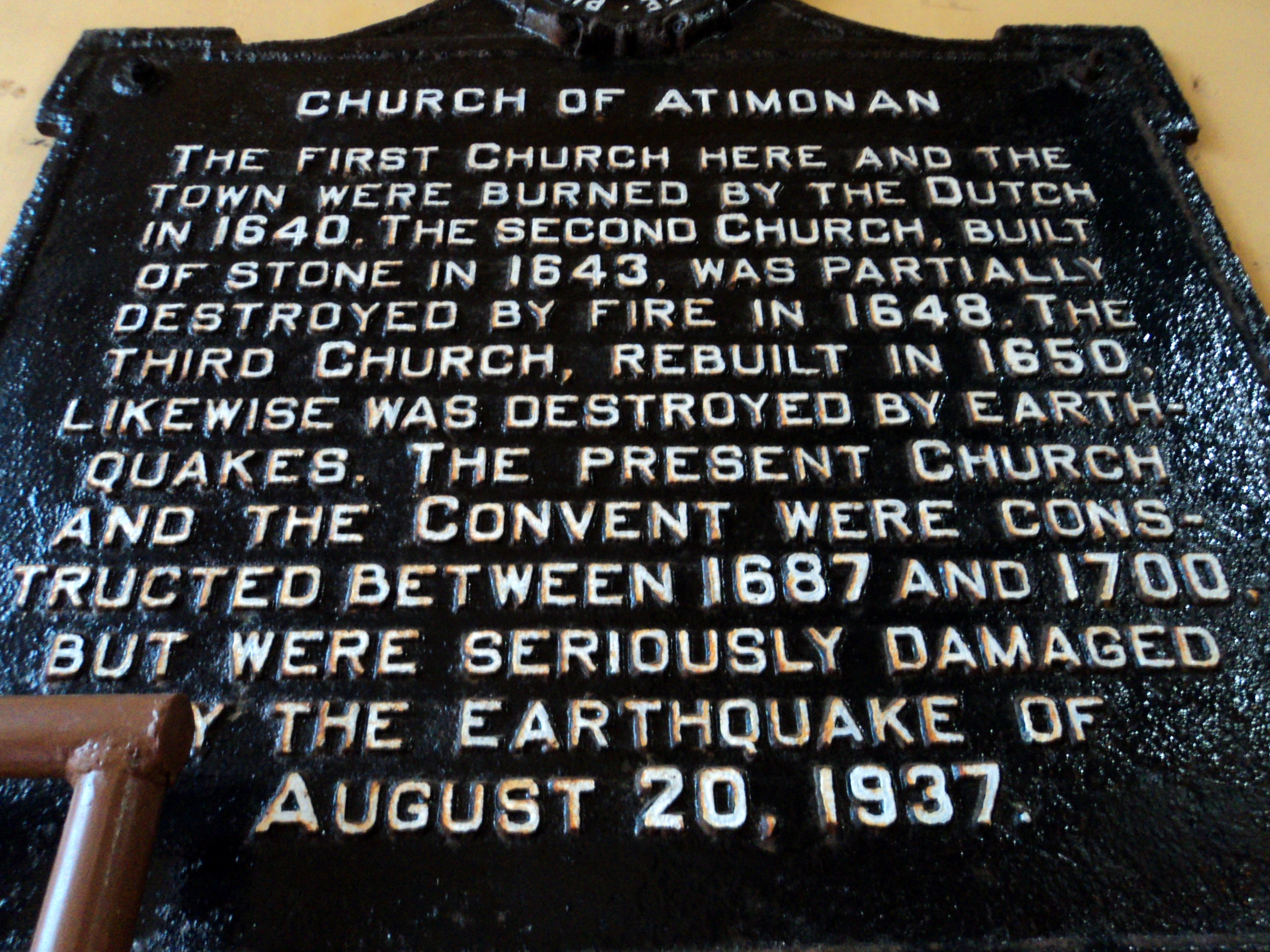
Historical marker

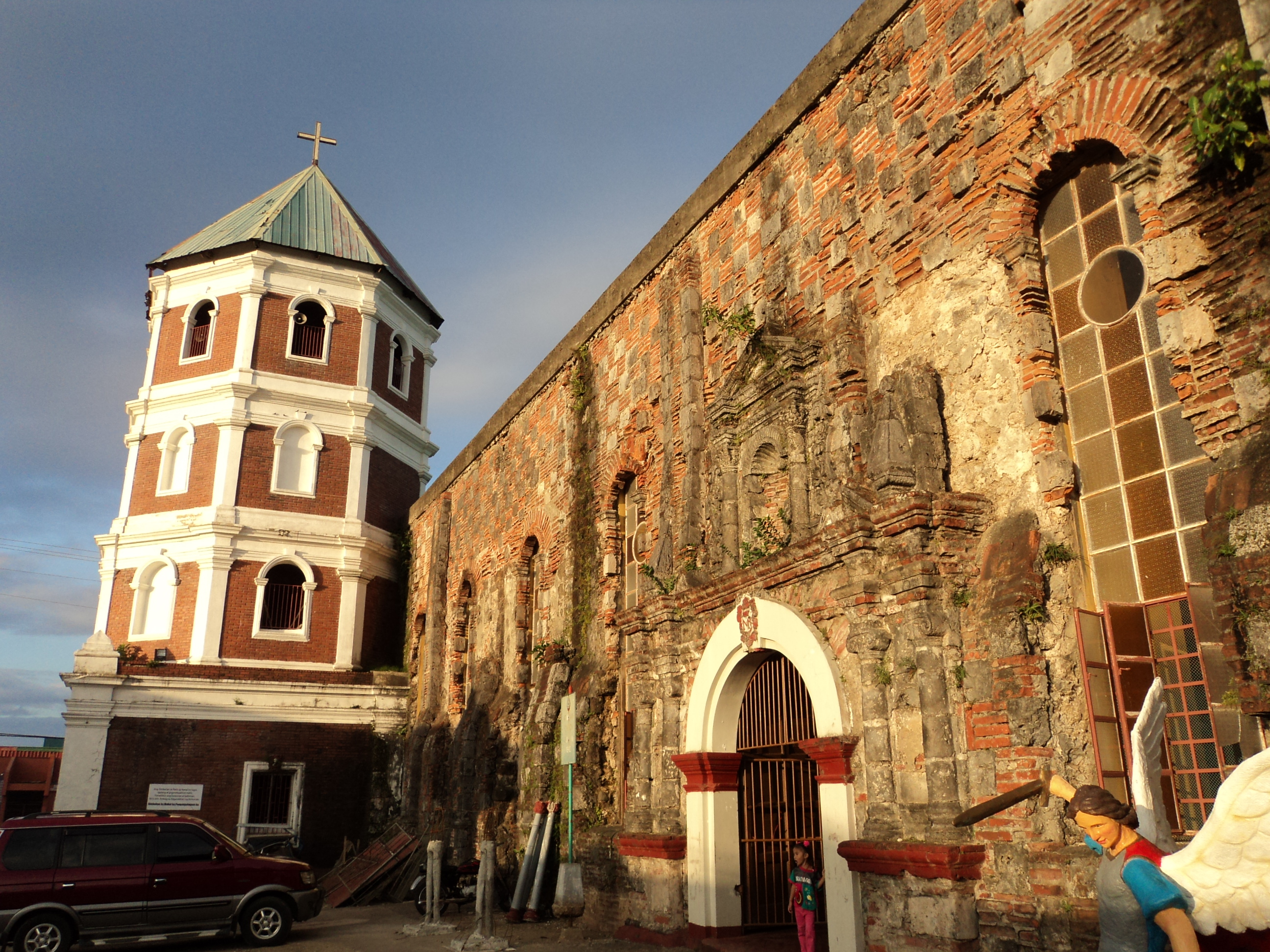
Church's original walls
