= Diocese of Boac =

Latin Catholic diocese in the Philippines

Diocese of Boac Dioecesis Boacensis Diyosesis ng Boac Diocesis de Boac

Catholic
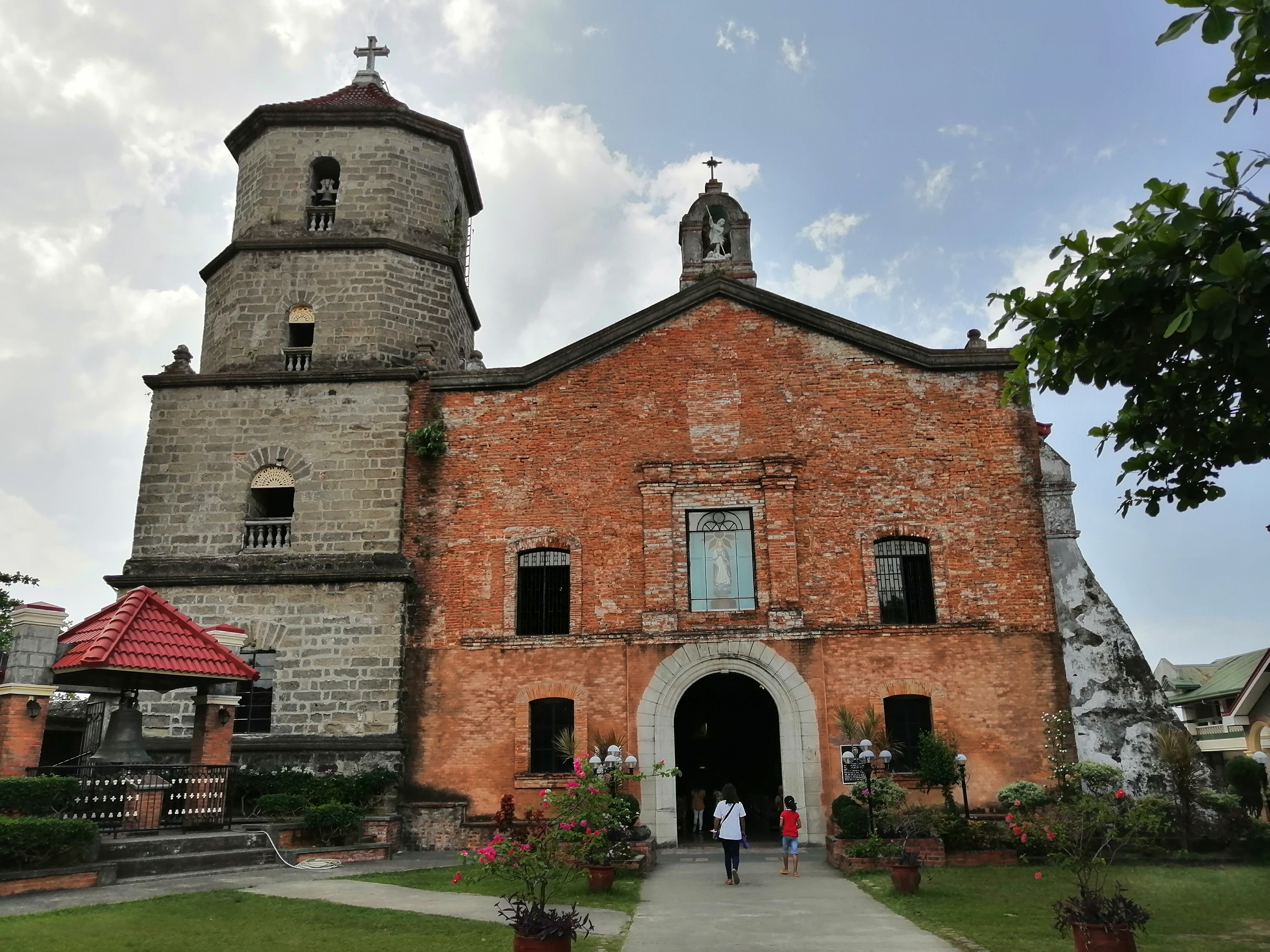
- Boac Cathedral

- Coat of arms

Location
- Country: Philippines
- Territory: Marinduque
- Ecclesiastical province: Lipa
- Metropolitan: Lipa
- Coordinates: 13°26′57″N 121°50′14″E

Statistics
- Area: 959 km^{2} (370 sq mi)
- Population: Total; Catholics: (as of 2021); 291,438; 256,611 (88%)
- Parishes: 14
- Churches: 14

Information
- Denomination: Catholic
- Sui iuris church: Latin Church
- Rite: Roman Rite
- Established: 10 May 1978
- Cathedral: Cathedral-Parish of the Immaculate Conception and Diocesan Shrine of Mahal na Birhen ng Biglang-Awa
- Patron saint: Mahal na Birhen ng Biglang-Awa (principal patroness); Immaculate Conception (secondary patroness)
- Secular priests: 35

Current leadership
- Pope: Leo XIV
- Bishop: Edwin Oracion Panergo
- Metropolitan Archbishop: Gilbert Armea Garcera
- Vicar General: Elino P. Esplana
- Judicial Vicar: Arvin Madla

Map
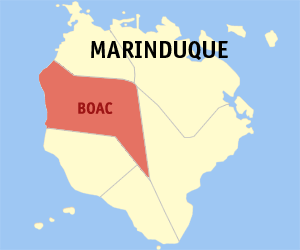
- Map of Marinduque showing the location of Boac

Website
- Website of the Diocese

The Diocese of Boac (Lat: "Dioecesis Boacensis") is a Latin Catholic diocese of the Catholic Church in the Philippines.

Created suffragan of the Archdiocese of Lipa, separating from the Mother Diocese of Lucena on 2 April 1977, it has jurisdiction over the province of Marinduque. It has a total area of 959.2 square kilometres (370.3 sq mi).

== History ==
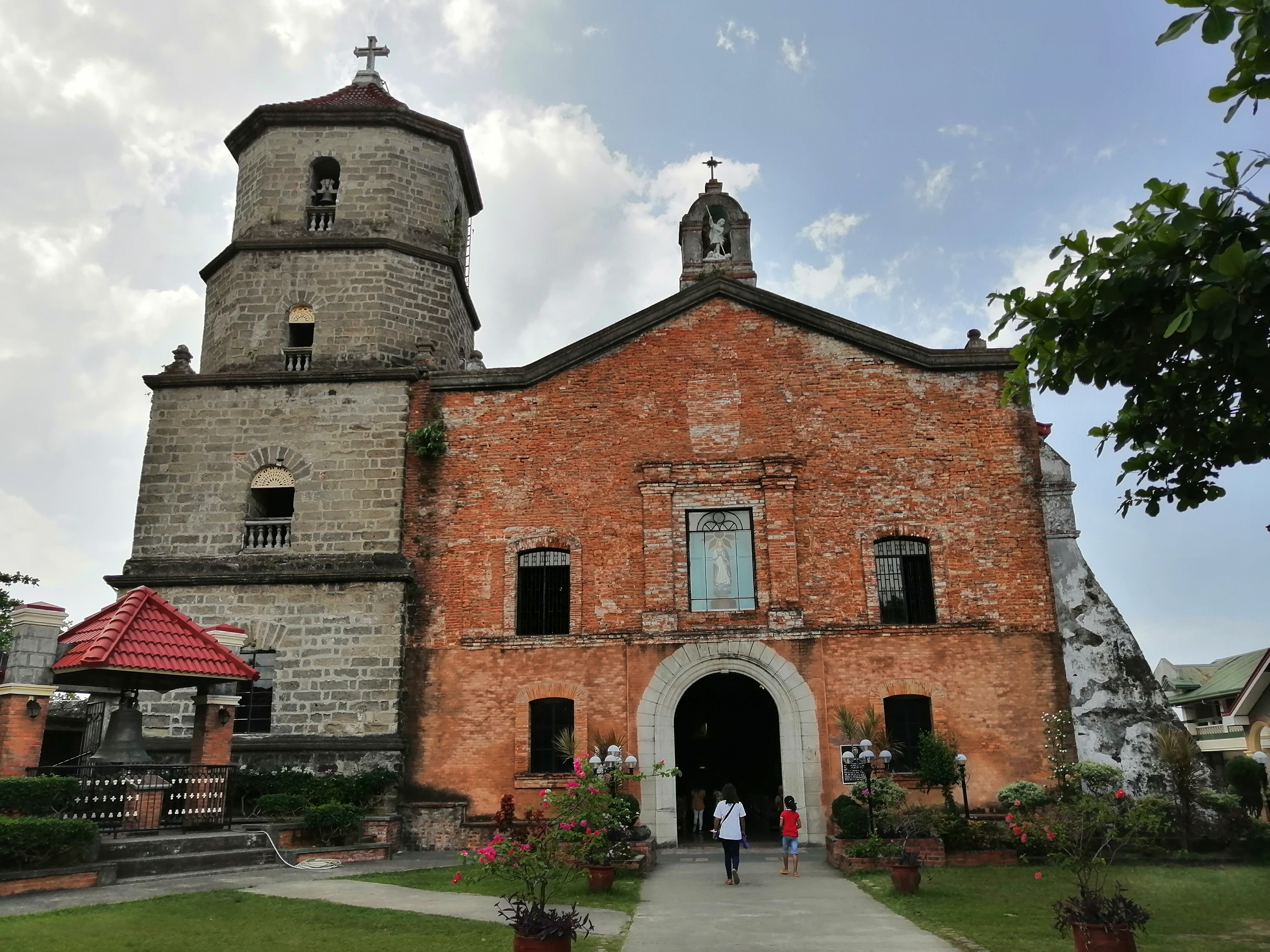
The Immaculate Conception Cathedral in Boac serves as the see of the diocese. It also enshrines the Mahal na Birhen ng Biglang-awa.

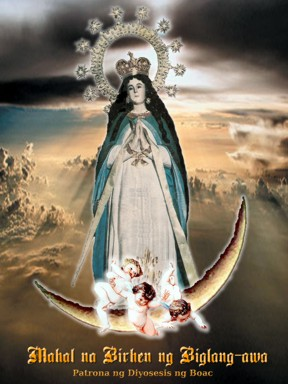
Our Lady of Biglang-awa, patroness of the Diocese of Boac

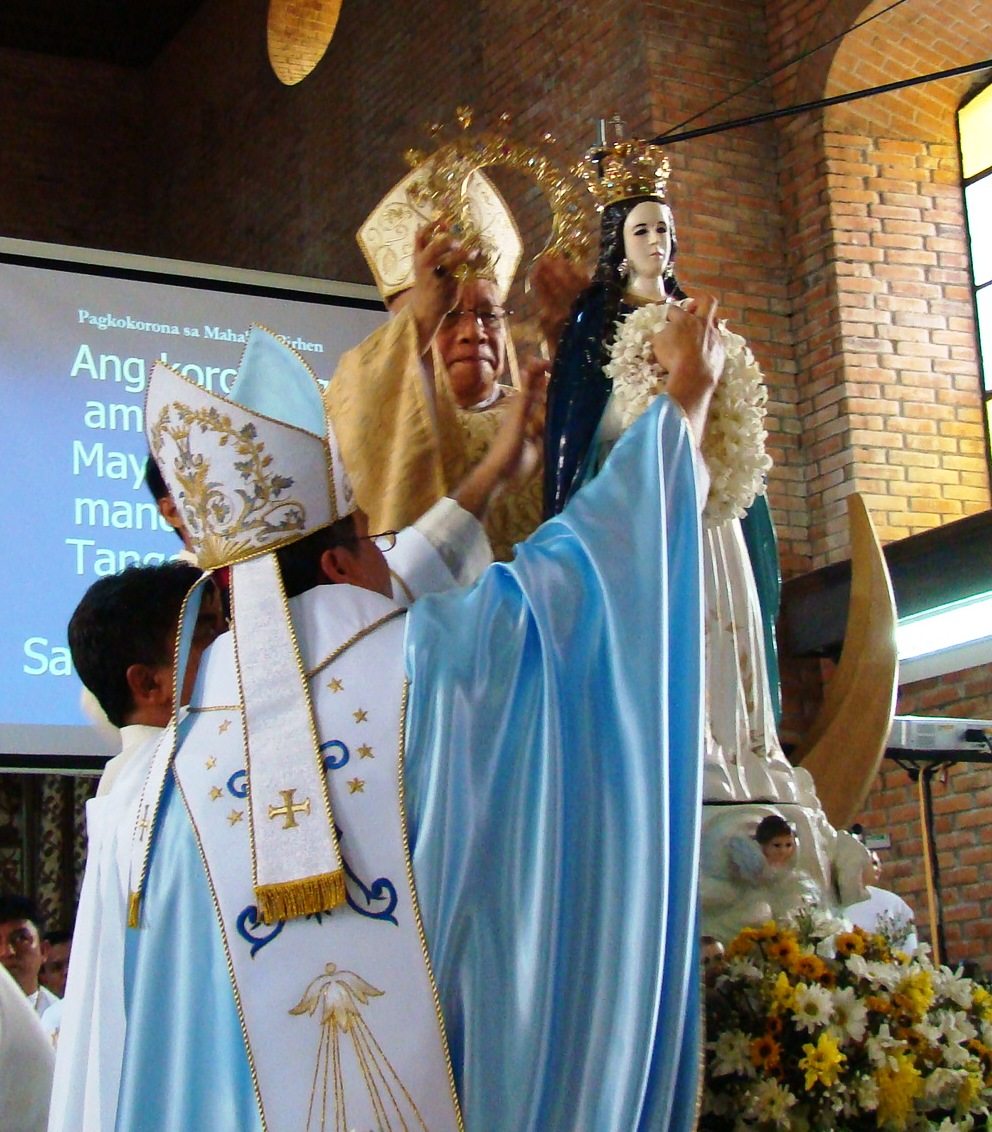
50th canonical coronation anniversary of Our Lady of Biglang-awa

In his book Estado geografico, topografico, estadistico, historico-religioso de la santa y apostolica provincial de S. Gregorio Magno, 1865, Felix de Huerta says that the first apostle to Marinduque was the Franciscan missionary Estevan Cruz, who planted the first cross in 1579 that paved the way for the evangelization of the people. The first visita was established in 1580 and it was called "Monserrat de Marinduque" (now Boac) with Alonzo Banol as its minister. In 1609 two other "visitas" were instituted, "San Juan de Marinduque" (now Sta. Cruz) and San Bernardo de Marinduque (now Gasan) with Pedro de Talavera and Juan Rosado as their first pastors, respectively. The Franciscans ceded the administration of the island to the archbishop of Manila in 1613.

The Jesuits in the Philippines 1581–1768, a book written by Horacio de la Costa, states that Archbishop Miguel Garcia Serrano of Manila entrusted the island of Marinduque to the care of the Society of Jesus in 1621. The Jesuits stayed in the province and founded the town of Boac on 8 December 1622 and later the towns of Sta. Cruz and Gasan. By virtue of a Spanish royal decree dated 19 May 1864, the Augusti-nian Recollect Fathers took over the spiritual administration of Boac in exchange for the curacies they left behind to the hands of the Jesuit missionaries in Mindanao.

Before the creation of the Diocese of Lipa by Pope Pius X, the island of Marinduque, from 14 August 1595 until 10 April 1910, belonged to Archdiocese of Manila. When the Diocese of Lucena was created on 20 August 1950, Marinduque became a part of her. On 2 April 1977, by virtue of the apostolic bull "Cum Tempore Maturare" issued by Pope Paul VI, Marinduque was created as an independent diocese, called the Diocese of Boac.

On 10 May 1978, carried by the effect of the papal bull, the Diocese of Boac was canonically erected according to the Decretum Executorium signed by Bruno Torpigliani, the Apostolic Nuncio to the Philippines. Rafael M. Lim, the former bishop of Laoag since 1971 and a native of Boac, was appointed on 26 January 1978 by Paul VI as the first bishop of the new diocese.

== Ordinaries ==
Bishop		Period in office	Notes	Coat of arms
1	Rafael Montiano Lim	May 10, 1978 – September 10, 1998 (20 years, 123 days)	Died in office	
2	José Francisco Oliveros	March 20, 2000 – May 14, 2004 (4 years, 55 days)	Appointed bishop of Malolos	
3	Reynaldo Gonda Evangelista	February 22, 2005 – April 8, 2013 (8 years, 45 days)	Appointed bishop of Imus	
4	Marcelino Antonio Malabanan Maralit Jr.	March 17, 2015 – September 21, 2024 (9 years, 188 days)	Appointed bishop of San Pablo	
5	Edwin Oracion Panergo	December 2, 2025 – present (238 days)		

== See also ==
- Catholic Church in the Philippines
