= Diocese of Lucena =

Latin Catholic diocese in the Philippines

Diocese of Lucena Dioecesis Lucenensis Diyosesis ng Lucena Diócesis de Lucena

Catholic
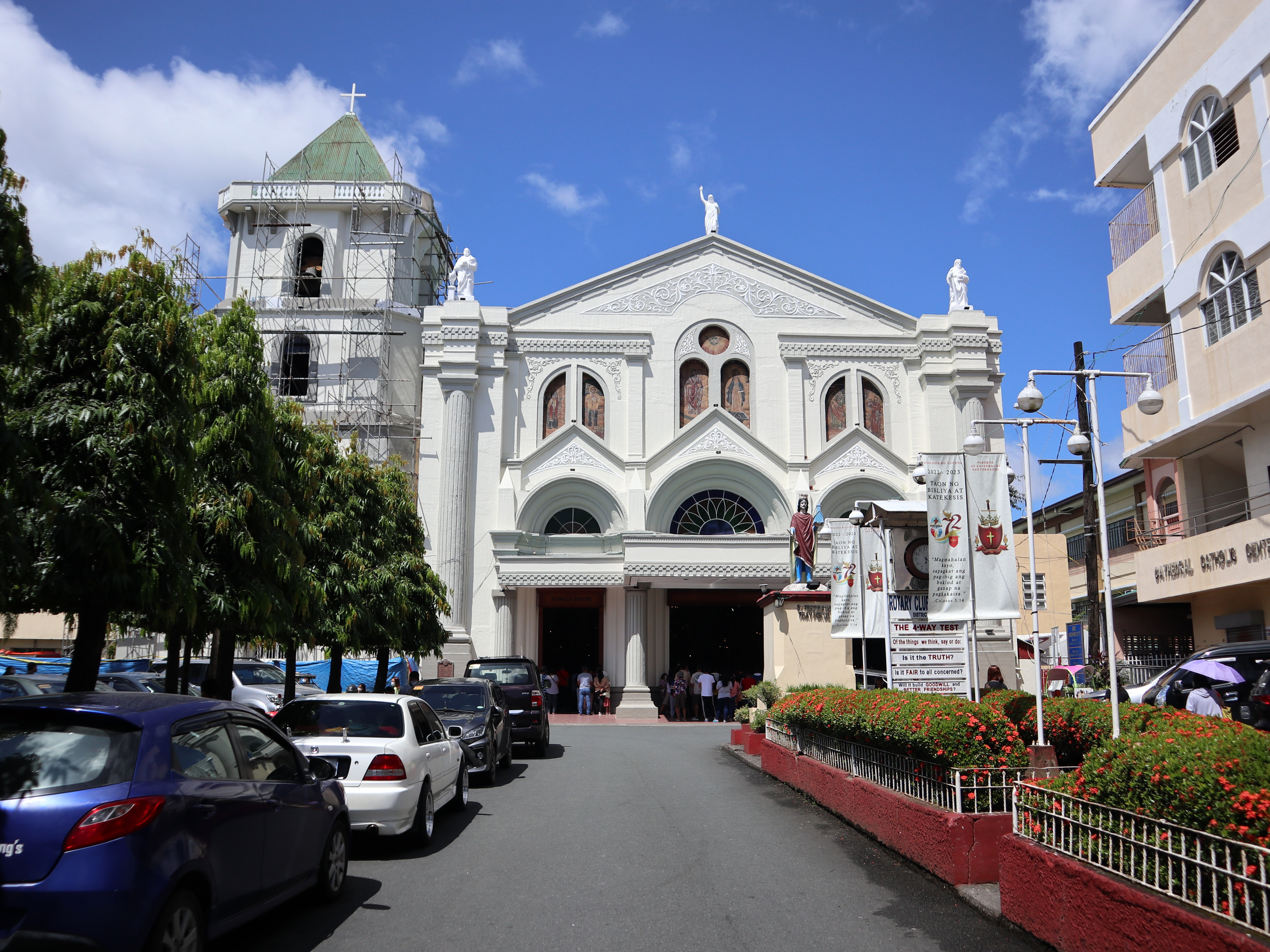
- Lucena Cathedral

- Coat of arms

Location
- Country: Philippines
- Territory: Central Quezon Province (Agdangan, Atimonan, Candelaria, Dolores, Lucban, Lucena, Mauban, Padre Burgos, Pagbilao, Plaridel, Sampaloc, San Antonio, Sariaya, Tayabas, Tiaong, Unisan)
- Ecclesiastical province: Lipa
- Metropolitan: Lipa
- Coordinates: 13°56′9.4″N 121°36′45″E

Statistics
- Area: 2,334 km^{2} (901 sq mi)
- Population: Total; Catholics: (as of 2021); 1,131,906; 1,009,259 (89.2%)

Information
- Denomination: Catholic
- Sui iuris church: Latin Church
- Rite: Roman Rite
- Established: September 8, 1950
- Cathedral: Cathedral-Parish of Saint Ferdinand in Lucena
- Patron saint: Saint Ferdinand
- Secular priests: 190+

Current leadership
- Pope: Leo XIV
- Bishop: Mel Rey Minoga Uy
- Metropolitan Archbishop: Gilbert Armea Garcera
- Vicar General: Bienvenido G. Lozano
- Bishops emeritus: Emilio Zurbano Marquez

Website
- Website of the Diocese of Lucena

The Diocese of Lucena (Latin: Dioecesis Lucenensis) is a Latin Catholic diocese of the Catholic Church in the Philippines with the seat in Lucena City. The diocese was erected in 1950 and was carved out from the then Diocese of Lipa and was a suffragan diocese of Manila. When Lipa was elevated to an archdiocese in 1972, the Diocese of Lucena was reassigned to the new Archdiocese. In 1977, the Diocese of Boac, which covers the parishes in the island-province of Marinduque, was created and separated from Lucena. In 1984, the Diocese of Lucena was further divided with the creation of the Diocese of Gumaca, which covers the municipalities of Quezon province east of Gumaca, Quezon.

Former coat of arms of the Diocese of Lucena

== Ordinaries ==
=== Bishops ===
Bishop		Period of Tenure	Coat of Arms
1.	Alfredo María Obviar y Aranda †	21 June 1969 Appointed - 25 Sep 1976 Retired	
2.	Jose Tomas Sanchez †	25 Sep 1976 Succeeded - 12 Jan 1982 Appointed, (Archbishop of Nueva Segovia)	
3.	Ruben Tolentino Profugo †	15 May 1982 Appointed - 13 Sep 2003 Resigned	
4.	Emilio Zurbano Marquez	13 Sep 2003 Succeeded - 29 Jul 2017 Retired	
5.	Mel Rey Mingoa Uy	29 Jul 2017 Succeeded - Present	

=== Coadjutor Bishops ===
Bishop		Period of Tenure
1.	Jose Tomas Sanchez †	12 Nov 1972 Appointed - 25 Sep 1976 Appointed (Bishop of Lucena)
2.	Emilio Zurbano Marquez	4 May 2002 Appointed - 13 Sep 2003 Appointed (Bishop of Lucena)

=== Auxiliary Bishops ===
Bishop		Period of Tenure
1.	Ruben Tolentino Profugo †	27 Aug 1979 Appointed - 15 May 1982 Appointed (Bishop of Lucena)

=== Apostolic/Diocesan Administrators ===
Bishop		Period of Tenure
1.	Rufino Jiao Santos †	8 Sep 1950 Appointed - 21 Jan 1951 Ceased
2.	Alfredo María Obviar y Aranda †	22 Jan 1951 Appointed - 21 June 1969 Appointed as First Residential Bishop of the Diocese

== Priest of the Diocese who became Bishops ==
- + Ricardo Cardinal Vidal, 3rd Metropolitan Archbishop of Archdiocese of Cebu (1982-2010)
- + Rafael Lim, 1st Bishop of Diocese of Boac (1978-1998)
- + Godofredo Pedernal, 2nd Bishop of the Diocese of Borongan (1968-1976) Ordained as a priest of the Diocese of Lipa before the erection of the Diocese of Lucena.
- + Angel Lagdameo, 5th Archbishop of the Archdiocese of Jaro (2000-2018).
- + Jose Francisco Oliveros, 4th Bishop of Diocese of Malolos (2004-2018). Ordained as a priest of the Diocese of Lucena before the erection of the Diocese of Gumaca.
- Emilio Zurbano Marquez, 1st Bishop of the Diocese of Gumaca, and 4th Bishop of the Diocese of Lucena (2002-2017)
- Edwin Oracion Panergo, 5th Bishop of the Diocese of Boac from 2025.
- Antonio Racelis Rañola, Auxiliary Bishop Emeritus of Archdiocese of Cebu (1990-2003)

== Schools ==
- Lucena Diocese Educational System (LUDES)
- Lucena Diocese Catholic Schools Association (LUDICSA)
- Casa del Nino Jesus de Cotta
- Casa del Nino Jesus de Lucban
- Casa del Niño Jesus de Pagbilao
- Casa del Nino de Palale
- Casa del Nino Jesus de Tayabas
- Child Jesus of Nasareth School
- Dominican Academy
- Gesu Bambino Parochial School, Inc.
- Holy Rosary Catholic School
- Lady Mediatrix Institute
- Lay Cathechists of San Pedro Calungsod
- Maryhill College
- Mother Perpetual Parochial School
- Our Lady of the Angels Academy
- Our Lady of the Most Holy Rosary Seminary
- Our Lady of Mt. Carmel Seminary
- Our Lady of Sorrows Academy
- Sacred Heart College
- San Roque Parochial School
- Scoula Gesu Bambino
- St. Alphonsus Regional Seminary
- St. Francis Academy
- St. Francis High School
- St. John Bosco College
- St. John Parochial School
- St. Joseph's Academy

== See also ==
- Catholic Church in the Philippines
