= Ruben T. Profugo =

Roman Catholic bishop active during the late twentieth and early twenty-first century

Ruben Tolentino Profugo
- Bishop of Lucena
- Church: Catholic Church
- Diocese: Diocese of Lucena
- In office: 15 May 1982 – 13 September 2003
- Predecessor: Jose Tomas Sanchez
- Successor: Emilio Z. Marquez
- Previous posts: Titular Bishop of Budua (1979-1982); Auxiliary Bishop of Lucena (1979-1982)

Orders
- Ordination: 18 December 1965
- Consecration: 18 October 1979 by Bruno Torpigliani

Personal details
- Born: 10 April 1938 Lucena, Quezon, Commonwealth of the Philippines
- Died: 12 May 2014 (aged 76)

Ruben T. Profugo (April 10, 1938 – May 12, 2014) was a Roman Catholic bishop.

Ordained to the priesthood in 1965, Profugo was named auxiliary bishop of the Diocese of Lucena, Philippine in 1979 and diocesan bishop of the Lucena Diocese in 1982. He resigned in 2003.
