= Mel Rey Uy =

Filipino Catholic prelate (born 1968)

The Most Reverend Mel Rey Uy D.D., PhL.
- Bishop of Lucena
- Church: Catholic Church
- Province: Lipa
- See: Lucena
- Appointed: July 29, 2017
- Installed: November 8, 2017
- Predecessor: Emilio Z. Marquez

Orders
- Ordination: May 24, 1994
- Consecration: November 8, 2017 by Cardinal Jose Advincula

Personal details
- Born: January 6, 1968 (age 58) San Agustin, Romblon, Philippines
- Denomination: Catholic Church
- Education: St. Pius X Seminary; University of Santo Tomas
- Motto: "Ut Faciam Voluntatem Eius." "To do his will."
- Coat of arms: Mel Rey Uy's coat of arms

Styles of Mel Rey Uy
- Reference style: His Excellency; The Most Reverend
- Spoken style: Your Excellency
- Religious style: Bishop

Mel Rey Mingoa Uy (born January 6, 1968) is the fifth Bishop of Lucena in the Philippines.

Uy was born January 6, 1968, in San Agustin, Romblon. He attended the St. Pius X Seminary in Roxas, Capiz, where he completed his philosophical studies, then the University of Santo Tomas (UST) in Manila, where he completed his theological studies. He later returned to UST to receive a master's degree in philosophy.

Before being appointed the fifth Bishop of the Roman Catholic Diocese of Lucena in the Philippines, Uy was a priest in the Diocese of Romblon. On July 29, 2017, Pope Francis appointed Uy as Bishop of Lucena, succeeding Emilio Z. Marquez.

In September 2020, Uy led a campaign against the construction of new coal-fired power plants in Atimonan, Quezon.

Under the leadership of Bishop Mel Rey M. Uy, the Diocese of Lucena continues to strengthen its pastoral, spiritual, educational, and missionary activities. In 2026, the diocese celebrated its 75th Founding Anniversary, marked by a Thanksgiving Concert entitled GRAZIE and the opening of the Year of Catholic Education. It also continued its missionary expansion through the elevation of three mission stations into parishes, providing wider opportunities for pastoral service and evangelization. Other significant activities included the Diocesan MSK General Assembly, preparations for the 6th Basic Ecclesial Community (BEC) National Assembly, the annual clergy retreat, and the Basic Orientation Workshop on Safeguarding Minors and Vulnerable Adults. The diocese also participated in charitable initiatives, including the celebration of the 15th anniversary of Pondo ng Pinoy. These developments demonstrate the continuing commitment of the Diocese of Lucena to strengthening the faith, promoting Christian education, supporting its clergy and lay organizations, and responding to the spiritual and social needs of the communities under its pastoral care.

Catholic Church titles
Preceded by Emilio Z. Marquez	Bishop of Lucena; November 8, 2017 – present	Incumbent
