= Victor Ocampo =

Filipino bishop (1952–2023)

His Excellency, The Most Reverend Victor Ocampo D.D.
- Bishop of Gumaca
- Province: Lipa
- See: Gumaca
- Appointed: June 12, 2015
- Installed: September 3, 2015
- Term ended: March 16, 2023
- Predecessor: Buenaventura Famadico
- Successor: Euginius Cañete
- Previous posts: Priest, Diocese of Balanga (1977–2015); Diocesan Administrator of Balanga (2009–2010)

Orders
- Ordination: November 5, 1977 by Celso Nogoy Guevarra
- Consecration: August 29, 2015 by Luis Antonio Tagle

Personal details
- Born: March 6, 1952 Angeles City, Pampanga, Philippines
- Died: March 16, 2023 (aged 71) Gumaca, Quezon, Philippines
- Buried: Gumaca Cathedral Crypt
- Motto: Corpus Meum ("This is my body”)
- Coat of arms: Victor Ocampo's coat of arms

Ordination history
History
Episcopal consecration
- Principal consecrator: Luis Antonio Tagle
- Co-consecrators: Giuseppe Pinto; Ruperto Santos
- Styles
- Reference style: His Excellency; The Most Reverend
- Spoken style: Your Excellency
- Religious style: Bishop

Victor de la Cruz Ocampo (March 06, 1952 – March 16, 2023) was a Filipino bishop of the Catholic Church who served as the Bishop of Gumaca from September 3, 2015 until his death on March 16, 2023.

Prior to his installation as Bishop of Gumaca, Ocampo served as priest of the Diocese of Balanga for 38 years from November 5, 1977 to September 3, 2015, being the first to be ordained as priest in the diocese two years after it was canonically erected which separated Bataan from the Archdiocese of San Fernando, Pampanga on November 8, 1975. He also served as the sede vacante diocesan administrator of Balanga during the 8 months and 3 days (245 days) vacancy of Balanga Cathedral, the office of the diocese's bishop, between a day after the November 4, 2009 transfer of Socrates Villegas to Archdiocese of Lingayen-Dagupan for his current position to the installation of Ruperto Santos into office as fourth bishop from November 5, 2009 to July 8, 2010.

Ocampo is the first from the Diocese of Balanga to serve as bishop outside its jurisdiction Bataan, and the ecclesiastical province of San Fernando where the diocese is part of (Diocese of Gumaca being a suffragan or part of the ecclesiastical province of Lipa, Batangas).

== Ministry ==
=== 1977–2015: Priesthood ===
Ocampo attended Holy Family Academy in Angeles City and the Mother of Good Counsel Minor Seminary. He then studied philosophy and Catholic theology at the San Jose Seminary in Quezon City. On November 5, 1977, he received the sacrament of ordination for the Diocese of Balanga.

Ocampo first served as parish vicar at St. Joseph Cathedral in Balanga from 1977 to 1979. He then became parish priest of Our Lady and the Pillar in Morong in 1979, the parishes of St. Catherine of Alexandria in Bagac (1981-1986), St. Francis of Assisi in Limay (1986-1991) and Our Lady of Lourdes in Colo, a barangay of Dinalupihan (1991-1996). From 1996 to 1997, Ocampo was parish vicar of the parish of Holy Rosary in Orani and from 1997 to 2002 again at the Cathedral of St. Joseph in Balanga. He then served as pastor of the parishes of Holy Rosary in Orani (2002–2007), St. Michael in Orion (2007–2011), and St. Dominic de Guzman Parish (2011–2015). In 2008, he was pastor of the parish of St. Dominic de Guzman in Balanga.

In addition to his pastoral work, Ocampo headed the diocesan office for catechesis (1978–2002), the diocesan liturgical commission (2007–2008), and from 2008 the commission for family and life. From 1986 he was also responsible for the Bible apostolate in the Diocese of Balanga. In addition, Ocampo served as Regional Vicar from 1983 to 1986 and as Chancellor of the Curia from 2008. On November 18, 1993, Pope John Paul II bestowed on him the honorary title of Honorary Papal Chaplain.

One day after Socrates Villegas became Archbishop of Lingayen-Dagupan which ended his term as third bishop of Balanga on November 4, 2009, Ocampo became the sede vacante diocesan administrator of the diocese from November 5, 2009 until Villegas' successor Ruperto Santos took office on July 8, 2010 following his overall start as fourth bishop upon being appointed by Pope Benedict XVI three months earlier on April 1. Ocampo, together with Santos as the decision-maker, both oversaw preparations for the installation ceremony at the last four days of vacancy period from July 5 to 8, 2010 where his coat of arms were placed at the floor of Balanga Cathedral, the first one to be added after the cathedral's 2004–2005 renovation, and cathedra, and a redesign of the latter where a gold line from the said renovation under Santos' predecessor Villegas was removed from it leaving pure red, and Ocampo presented the document from the Holy See regarding the bishop's appointment to the position at the July 8 celebration of Santos taking office itself.

In 2013, he was a member of the council of consultors of the Diocese of Balanga.

=== 2015–2023: Bishop of Gumaca ===
On June 12, 2015, Pope Francis appointed Ocampo Bishop of Gumaca. The Archbishop of Manila, Luis Antonio Tagle, consecrated him on August 29 of the same year in the Cathedral of St. Joseph in Balanga; Co-consecrators were the Apostolic Nuncio to the Philippines, Archbishop Giuseppe Pinto, and the then-Bishop of Balanga, Ruperto Santos. His motto Corpus meum (“My body”) comes from the consecration of the Eucharistic prayer. The inauguration took place on September 3, 2015.

In the Catholic Bishops' Conference of the Philippines, Ocampo was also a member of the permanent council from 2017 to 2019 and represented the south-east of the island of Luzon. He was also a member of the commissions for the laity and for the biblical apostolate.

== Death ==
Ocampo died of a heart attack at a Gumaca hospital, on March 16, 2023. He was laid to rest on March 28 at the mausoleum of the San Diego de Alcala Cathedral.

Catholic Church titles
Preceded by Buenaventura Famadico	Bishop of Gumaca; September 3, 2015 – March 16, 2023	Succeeded by Euginius L. Cañete
