= Jose Francisco Oliveros =

Filipino Roman Catholic prelate

The Most Reverend Jose Francisco Oliveros D.D.
- Bishop of Malolos
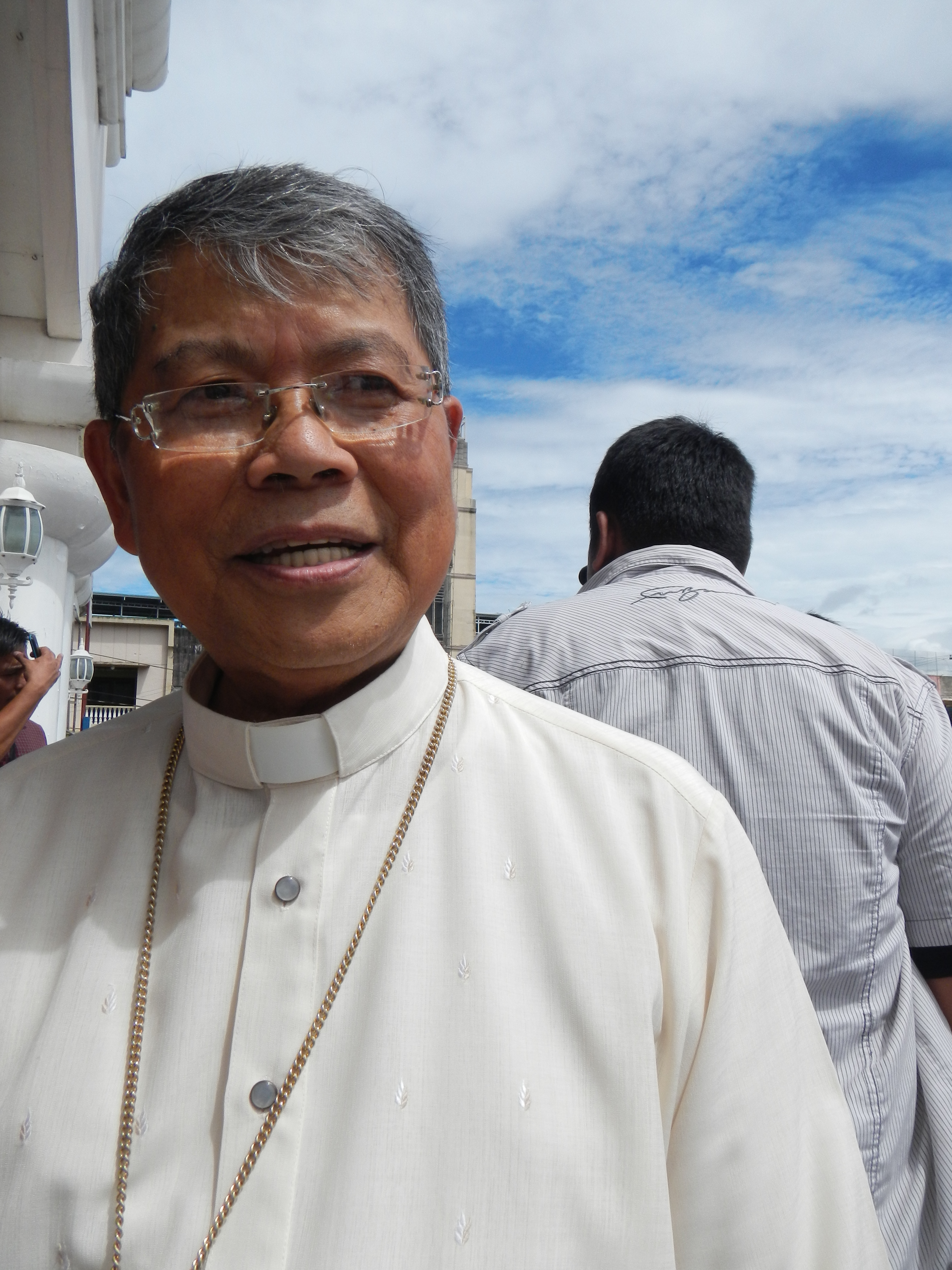
- Oliveros in 2014
- See: Malolos
- Appointed: May 14, 2004
- Installed: August 5, 2004
- Term ended: May 11, 2018
- Predecessor: Rolando Tria Tirona
- Successor: Dennis Villarojo
- Other post: Bishop of Boac (2000–2004)

Orders
- Ordination: November 28, 1970 by Pope Paul VI
- Consecration: March 20, 2000 by Antonio Franco

Personal details
- Born: Jose Francisco Oliveros; September 11, 1946 Quezon, Quezon, Philippines
- Died: May 11, 2018 (aged 71) Malolos, Bulacan, Philippines
- Buried: Malolos Cathedral Crypt
- Denomination: Roman Catholic
- Education: University of Santo Tomas Central Seminary
- Motto: Confido in Misericordia Dei (I trust in the mercy of God)
- Coat of arms

Styles of Jose F. Oliveros
- Reference style: The Most Reverend
- Spoken style: Your Excellency
- Religious style: Bishop

Jose Francisco Oliveros (September 11, 1946 – May 11, 2018) was a Filipino Roman Catholic prelate, who served as the fourth Bishop of the Roman Catholic Diocese of Malolos.

Before being transferred to Malolos, he was a professor and priest-formator at the St. Alphonsus School of Theology, in Lucena City from 1972-1973, subsequently becoming its vice-rector in 1982-1983 and rector from 1983-1992.

He later became bishop of Boac, Marinduque from 2000-2004.

== Early life ==
Oliveros was born on September 11, 1946. His parents were Vicente Oliveros and Angelina Francisco, from Quezon in the eponymous province. He studied at Our Lady of Mount Carmel Minor Seminary in Sariaya and the University of Santo Tomas Central Seminary in Manila. He completed his master’s degree in psychology from the Ateneo de Manila University and a doctorate in sacred theology from the Pontifical University of Saint Thomas Aquinas in Rome, Italy.

== Priesthood ==
He was ordained a priest on November 28, 1970 at Luneta (Rizal Park) in Manila by Pope Paul VI. He was incardinated as a priest in the Diocese of Gumaca, Quezon, in 1984.

Oliveros was also a seminary formator. He first served as a professor and Spiritual Director at the Our Lady of Mt. Carmel Seminary in Sariaya, Quezon from 1971-1972. He then taught at the St. Alphonsus School of Theology in Lucena City from 1972-1973. After assignments in the United States, and Germany, he became the vice-rector of St. Alphonsus School of Theology from 1982-1983, subsequently appointed as rector from 1983-1992.

== Episcopacy ==
Pope John Paul II appointed him on February 2, 2000, Bishop of the Diocese of Boac. He was consecrated bishop on March 20, 2000, in the Cathedral of San Diego de Alcala in Gumaca, Quezon by Archbishop Antonio Franco, former Apostolic Nuncio to the Philippines. The principal co-consecrators were Archbishop Gaudencio Borbon Rosales, then-Archbishop of Lipa and Bishop Emilio Zurbano Marquez, then-Bishop of Gumaca. His episcopal motto is "Confido in Misericordia Dei (I trust in the mercy of God)," taken from Psalm 52.

On August 15, 2003, Oliveros was appointed Apostolic Administrator of the Diocese of Malolos, while remaining in his office as bishop of Boac. On May 14, 2004, he was appointed Bishop of Malolos. He was installed on August 5, 2004, at Cathedral-Basilica of the Immaculate Conception (Malolos Cathedral) in Malolos.

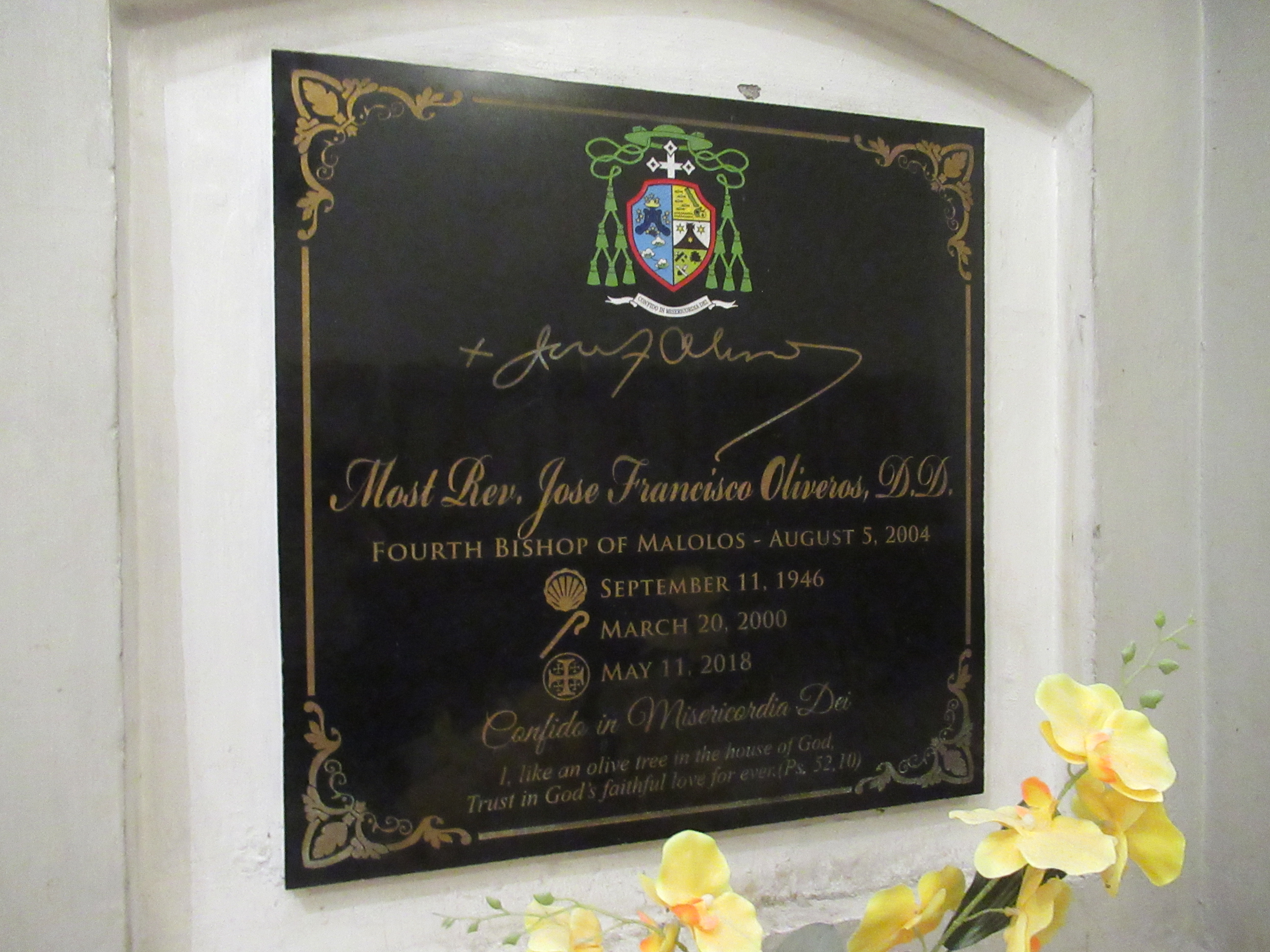
Malolos Cathedral Crypt

He died on May 11, 2018, after a lengthy illness, particularly prostate cancer, at age 71. He is the first bishop of Malolos to die in office. Among his last activities were the episcopal ordination of Most Rev. Bartolome G. Santos, who, at that time, was recently appointed as the 5th Bishop of Iba, which he celebrated alongside San Fernando, Pampanga Archbishop Florentino Lavarias and Manila Archbishop Cardinal Luis Antonio Cardinal Tagle at the Malolos Cathedral on April 30, 2018, and his last two masses at the San Miguel Arcangel Parishes in the towns of Marilao and San Miguel held on May 8, 3 days before his death. He is buried at the crypt of the Malolos Cathedral. Upon Oliveros' death, Pope Francis appointed Honesto Ongtioco, then second bishop of Balanga, Bataan from April 8, 1998 to August 28, 2003 and bishop of Cubao since August 28, 2003, as the diocese's sede vacante apostolic administrator from May 11, 2018 until the installation of Dennis Villarojo as fifth bishop into office on August 21, 2019.

== See also ==
- Catholic Church in the Philippines

Catholic Church titles
Preceded by Rafael Montiano Lim	Bishop of Boac; March 20, 2000 – August 5, 2004	Succeeded by Reynaldo G. Evangelista
Preceded by Rolando T. Tirona	Bishop of Malolos; August 5, 2004 – May 11, 2018	Succeeded by Dennis C. Villarojo
