= Euginius Cañete =

Philippine Catholic bishop (born 1966)

The Most Reverend Euginius Cañete MJ, D.D., JCL
- Bishop of Gumaca
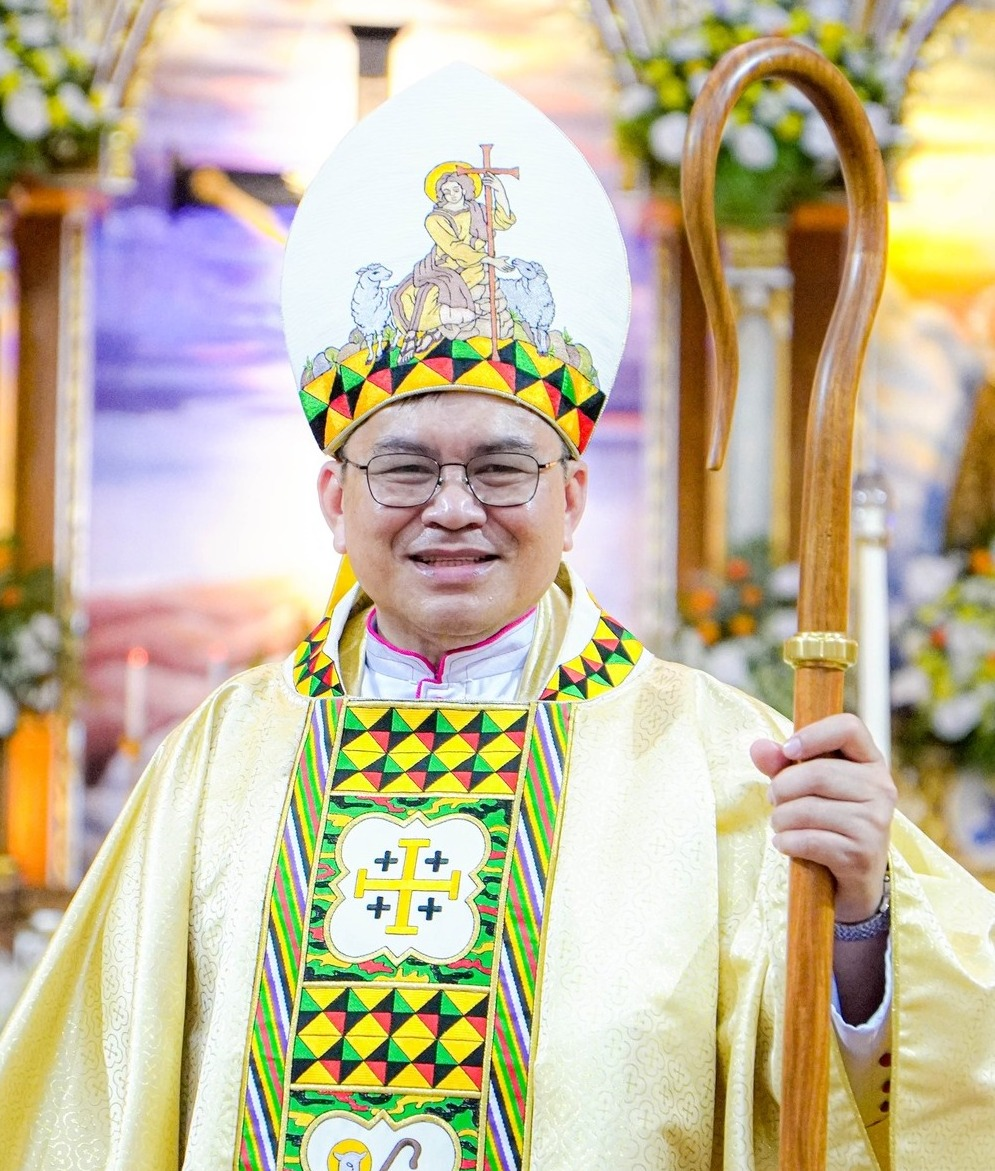
- Cañete in 2025
- Province: Lipa
- See: Gumaca
- Appointed: September 30, 2024
- Installed: January 4, 2025
- Predecessor: Victor Ocampo

Orders
- Ordination: December 18, 1995
- Consecration: December 28, 2024 by Pablo Virgilio David

Personal details
- Born: July 8, 1966 Liloan, Cebu, Philippines
- Motto: Go and Make Disciples (Matthew 28:19–20)
- Coat of arms: Euginius Cañete's coat of arms

Ordination history
History
Episcopal consecration
- Principal consecrator: Pablo Virgilio David
- Co-consecrators: Ruperto Santos; José S. Palma
- Styles
- Reference style: His Excellency; The Most Reverend
- Spoken style: Your Excellency
- Religious style: Bishop

Euginius "Boyet" Longakit Cañete (born July 8, 1966) is a Filipino bishop of the Catholic Church who serves as the fourth bishop of the Diocese of Gumaca in Quezon Province, Philippines. He was appointed to this position by Pope Francis on September 30, 2024, and was officially installed on January 4, 2025.

== Early life and education ==
Cañete was born in Liloan, Cebu. He pursued studies in psychology at Maryshore Major Seminary and La Salle College in Bacolod City. He furthered his education in philosophy and theology at Maryhill School of Theology in Quezon City. In 2003, he obtained a licentiate in canon law from the Pontifical Gregorian University in Rome.

== Priesthood ==
On December 18, 1995, Cañete was ordained as a priest for the Congregation of the Immaculate Heart of Mary (CICM). He later became one of the founding members of the Missionaries of Jesus (MJ), an international and multicultural religious missionary community established in the Philippines in 2002. Within the MJ congregation, he held various roles, including secretary general, rector of the MJ Scholasticate in Antipolo City, vicar general, and coordinator general.

== Episcopal Appointment and Ministry ==
Pope Francis appointed Cañete as the bishop of the Diocese of Gumaca on September 30, 2024. His episcopal ordination took place on December 28, 2024, at the Antipolo Cathedral, and he was installed as the fourth bishop of Gumaca on January 4, 2025, at the Cathedral of San Diego de Alcala in Gumaca town.

== Academic contributions ==
Bishop Cañete has been involved in academia, teaching canon law and other theological subjects at institutions such as the Recoletos School of Theology, the Institute of Formation and Religious Studies, the Inter-Congregational Theological Center, and Saint Vincent School of Theology, all located in Quezon City. He is also a member of the Catholic Theological Society of the Philippines and the Canon Law Society of the Americas.

== Advocacy ==
In February 2025, Bishop Cañete led an appeal urging the urgent repair and improvement of the primary highways Quezon province, highlighting the deteriorating condition of the roads and their impact on the community.

Catholic Church titles
Preceded by Victor Ocampo	Bishop of Gumaca; January 4, 2025 – present	Incumbent
