= Gumaca Cathedral =

Roman Catholic church in Quezon, Philippines

- Cathedral Parish & Diocesan Shrine of San Diego de Alcala
- Parokyang Katedral at Dambanang Diyosesano ni San Diego ng Alcala (Filipino); Catedral, Parroquia y Santuario Diosesano de San Diego de Alcalá (Spanish)
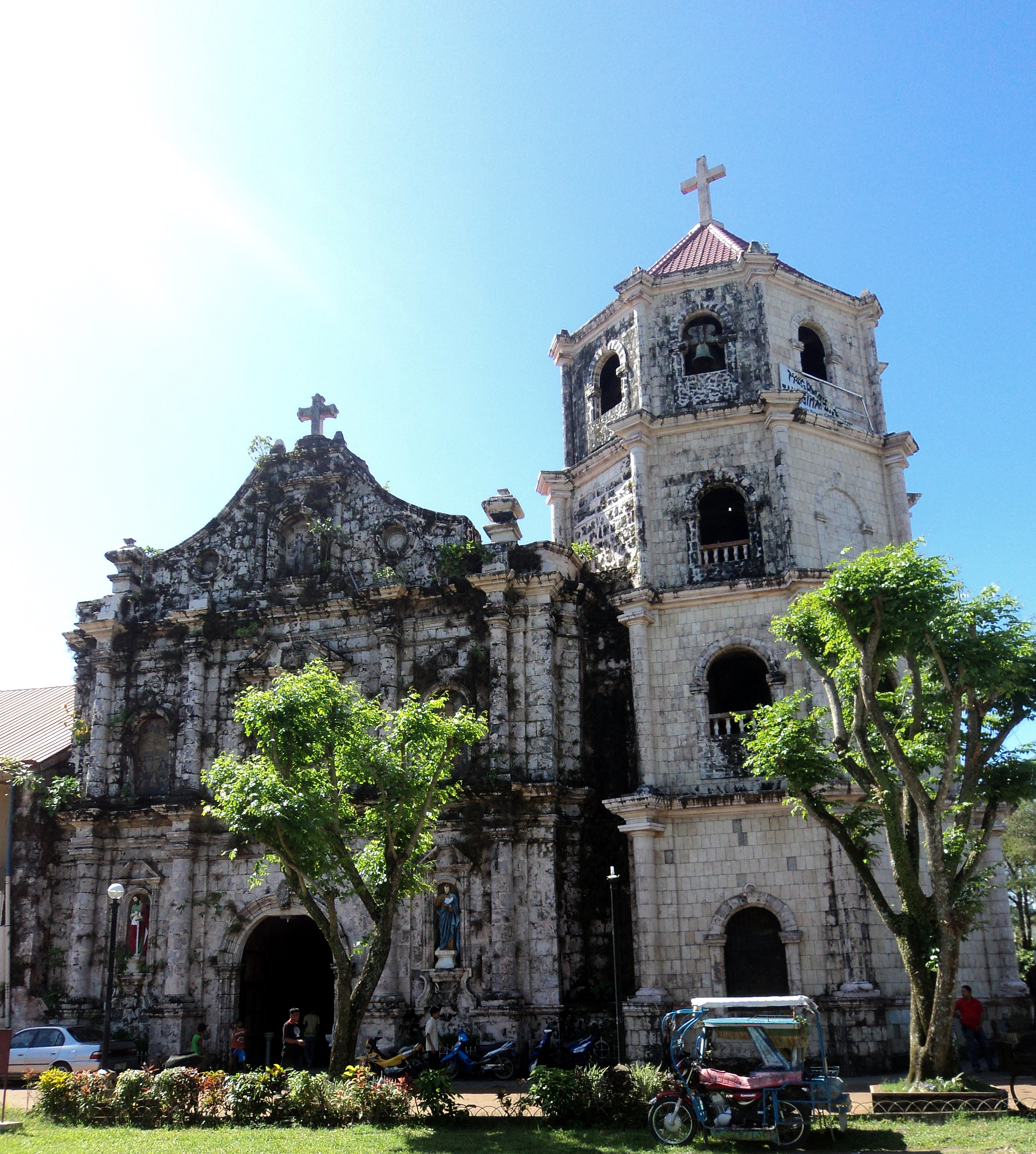
- Cathedral facade in 2012

- Location in Luzon Location in the Philippines
- 13°55′18″N 122°05′58″E
- Location: Gumaca, Quezon
- Country: Philippines
- Denomination: Roman Catholic

History
- Status: Cathedral & Shrine
- Founded: 1582
- Dedication: Saint Didacus of Alcala

Architecture
- Functional status: Active
- Architectural type: Church building
- Style: Baroque
- Completed: 1747, 1846, 1999
- Demolished: 1685

Administration
- Province: Lipa
- Metropolis: Lipa
- Archdiocese: Lipa
- Diocese: Gumaca

Clergy
- Archbishop: Gilbert Armea Garcera
- Bishop(s): Euginius “Eugene” Longakit Cañete, C.I.C.M (January 4, 2025)

Cathedral Parish & Diocesan Shrine of San Diego De Alcala, commonly known as Gumaca Cathedral, is a Baroque-style, Roman Catholic cathedral located at Barangay San Diego, in Gumaca, Quezon province, Calabarzon, Philippines. It is the seat and the mother church of the Diocese of Gumaca.

== History ==
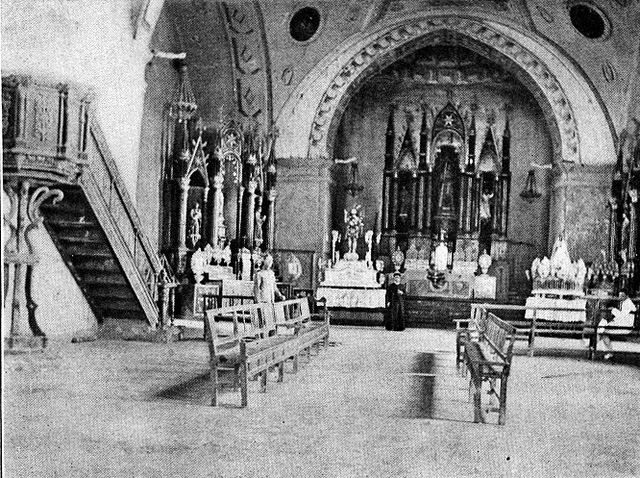
Archival photo of the cathedral, showing the original retablo done in Neo-Gothic design, and the trompe-l'oeil ceiling paintings

The cathedral was first established in 1582 by the Franciscans, who were the first missionaries who brought Christianity to Gumaca, on its present site. It was transferred to Silangan in Alabat island in 1638. It was burned by the Dutch forces in 1665, which subsequently resulted to them transferring back to its original site in Gumaca. The church was reconstructed in 1690 and completed in 1747. The edifice and the adjoining convent were beautified in 1846. When a strong earthquake hit Gumaca on August 20, 1937, the uppermost portion of the church belfry toppled down, leaving only three of the five-level belfry intact. During the term of Msgr. Jose Oliveros, the belfry and choir loft were reconstructed and was completed in 1999. Known as one of the biggest and oldest Catholic churches in the province of Quezon, the church is made out of coral stone blocks and bricks.

Though the design of the church is mainly Baroque, archival photos show that the interiors were mainly done in Gothic Revival architecture. Its retablos and arco toral design clearly reflects this style, possible due to its popularity in the early 19th century. The church was renovated, and the retablos, together with the pulpit, were lost.

== Gallery ==
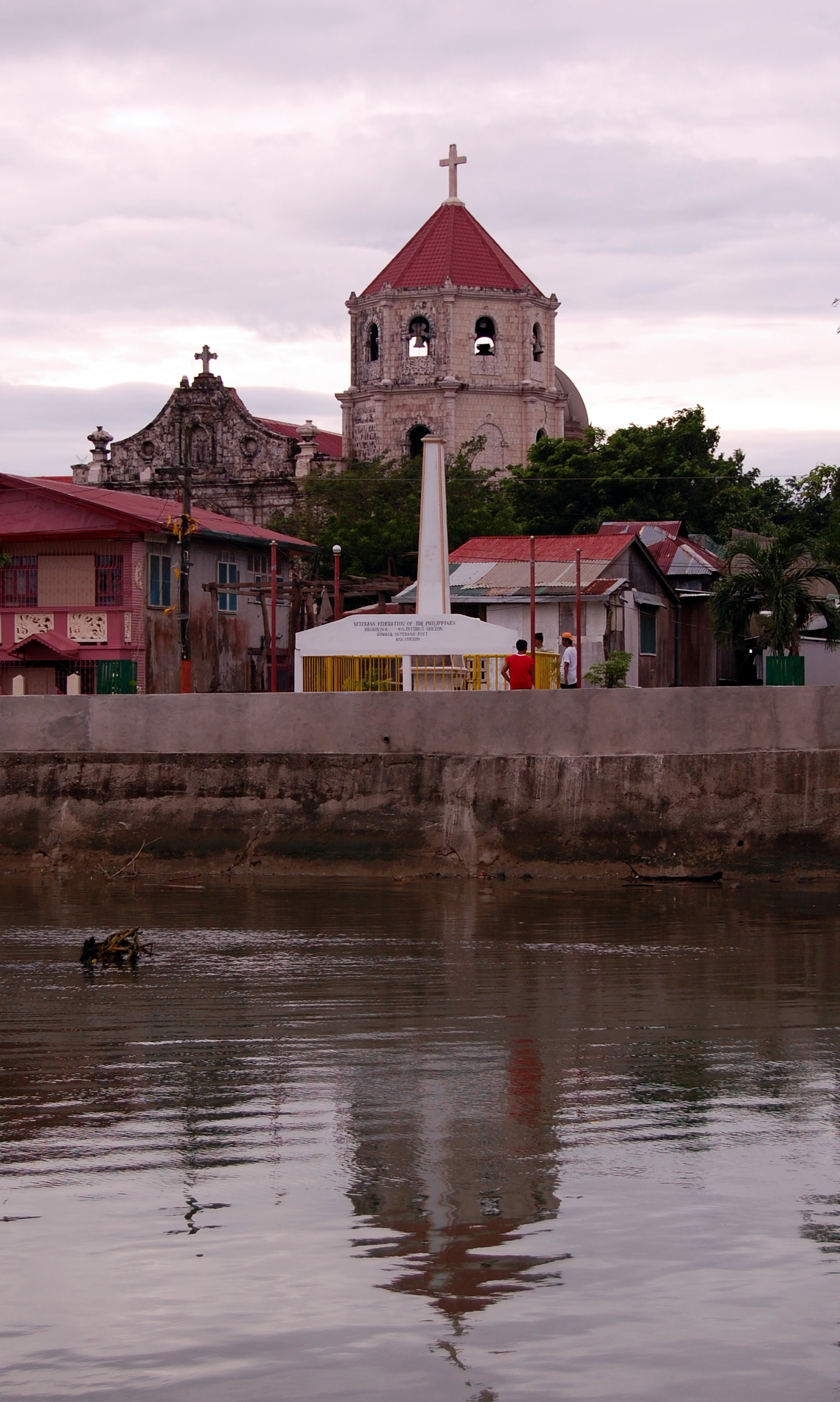
The cathedral as seen from the sea

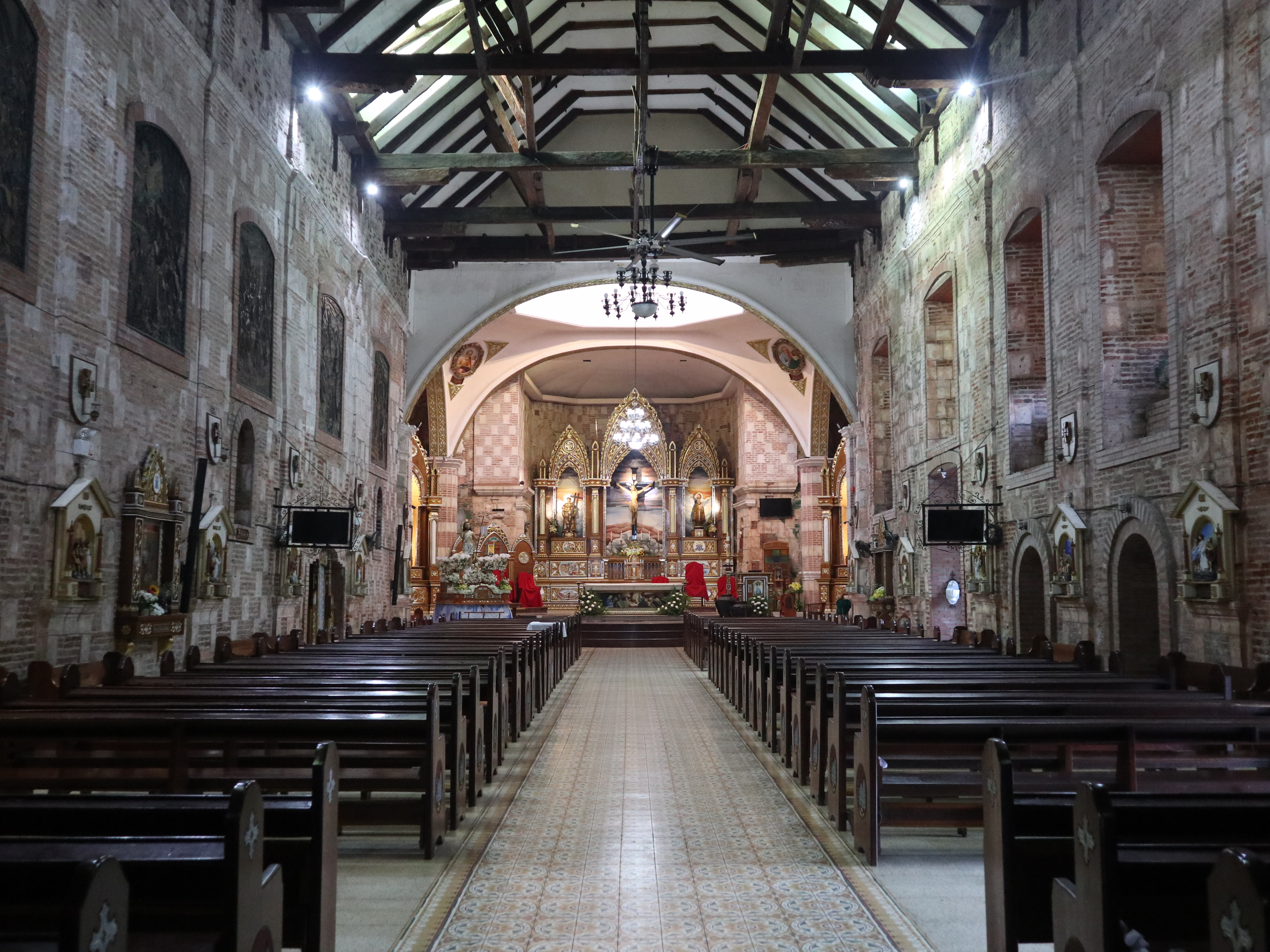
Cathedral interior in 2023

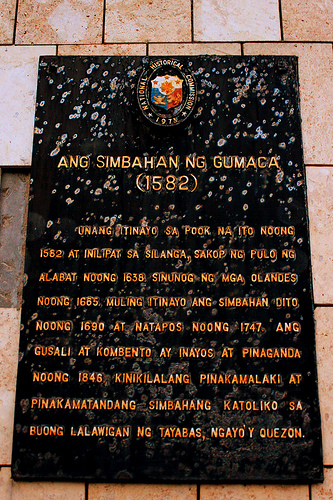
Church NHC historical marker

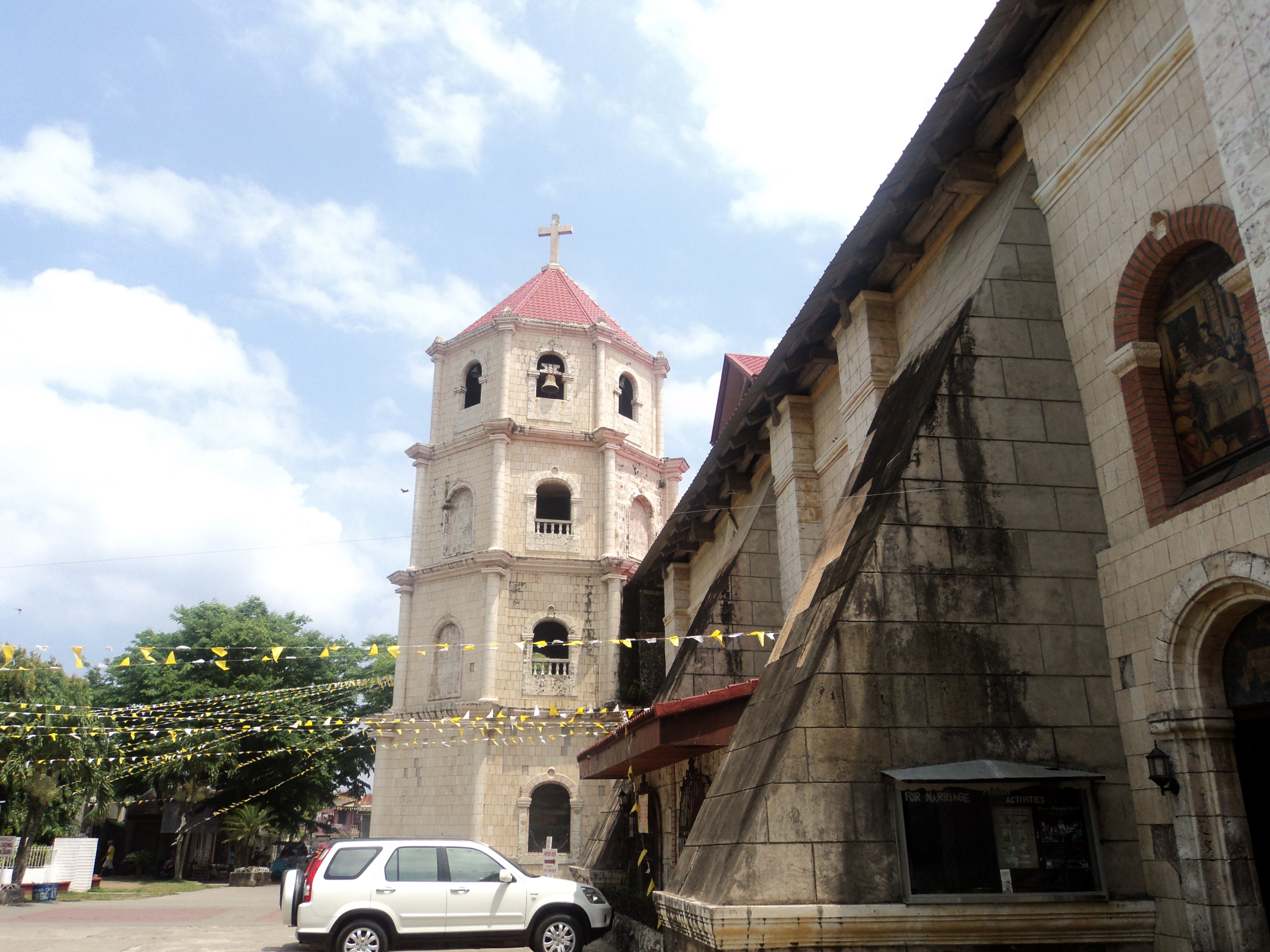
The cathedral's belfry and buttresses
