= Diocese of Gumaca =

Latin Catholic diocese in the Philippines

Diocese of Gumaca Diocesis Gumacana Diyosesis ng Gumaca Diócesis de Gumaca

Catholic
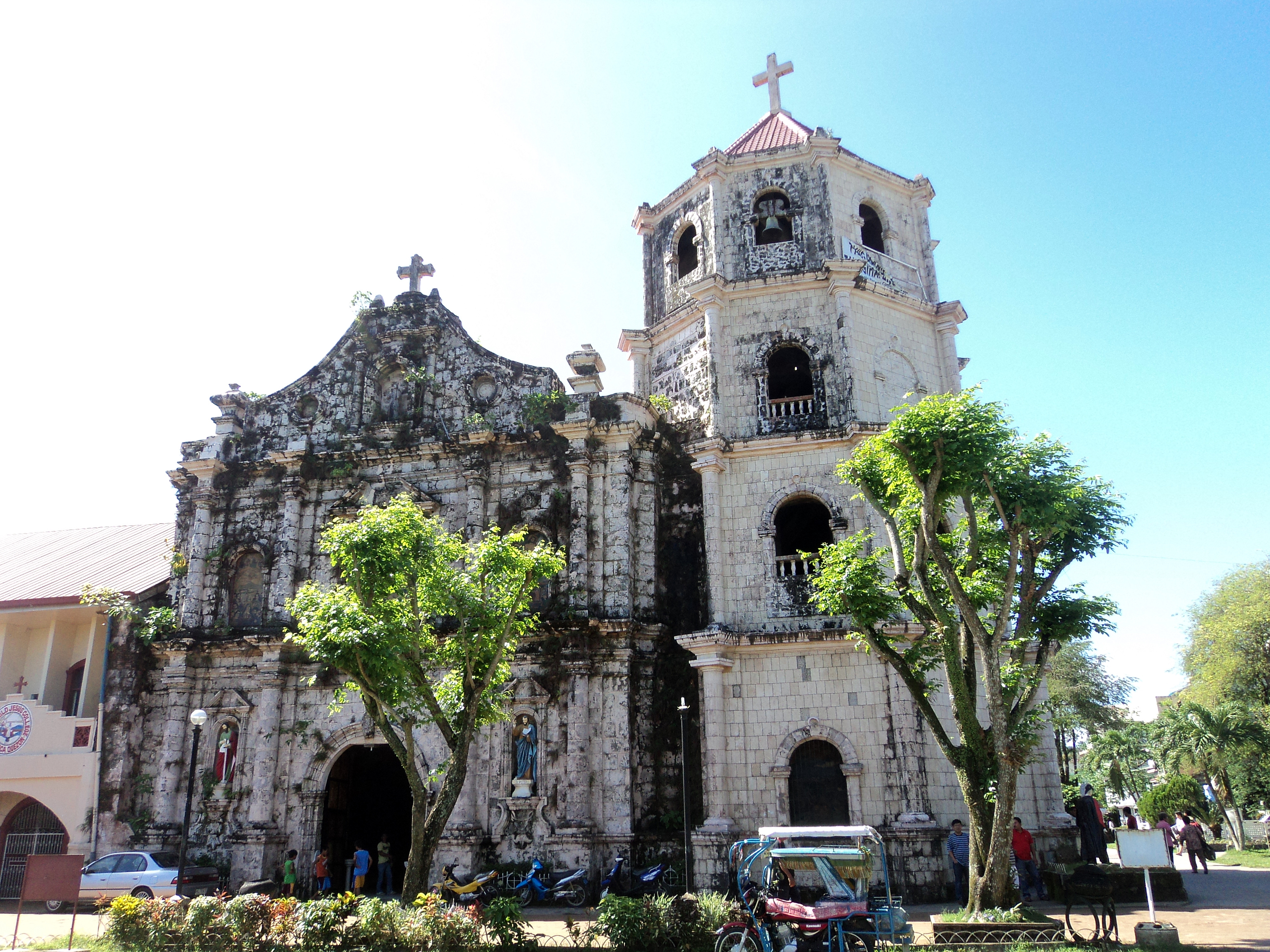
- Gumaca Cathedral

- Coat of arms

Location
- Country: Philippines
- Territory: Eastern Quezon Province (Alabat, Buenavista, Calauag, Catanauan, General Luna, Guinayangan, Gumaca, Lopez, Macalelon, Mulanay, Perez, Pitogo, Quezon, San Andres, San Francisco, San Narciso, Tagkawayan)
- Ecclesiastical province: Lipa
- Metropolitan: Lipa
- Coordinates: 13°55′17″N 122°05′58″E

Statistics
- Area: 3,666 km^{2} (1,415 sq mi)
- Population: Total; Catholics: (as of 2021); 1,059,760; 902,270 (85.1%)

Information
- Denomination: Catholic
- Sui iuris church: Latin Church
- Rite: Roman Rite
- Established: April 9, 1984
- Cathedral: Cathedral-Parish of St. Didacus of Alcala
- Patron saint: Didacus of Alcalá

Current leadership
- Pope: Leo XIV
- Bishop: Euginius Cañete
- Metropolitan Archbishop: Gilbert Armea Garcera
- Vicar General: Ramon D. Uriarte

The Diocese of Gumaca (Lat: Dioecesis Gumacana) is a Latin Catholic diocese in the Philippines centered in the Municipality of Gumaca in Quezon province. The diocese covers the communities of Gumaca; Pitogo, due south of Gumaca; and all the parishes of eastern Quezon province situated east of Gumaca and Pitogo. The Gumaca diocese was erected in 1984, carved out from the Diocese of Lucena. Both dioceses are suffragan of the Archdiocese of Lipa.

== History ==
On September 30, 2024, Pope Francis appointed Rev. Fr. Euginius “Eugene” Longakit Cañete, M.J. (born 8 Jul 1966) as fourth bishop of Gumaca.

He was episcopally ordained at the Antipolo Cathedral on December 28, 2024, by Cardinal Pablo Virgilio David with co-consecrators Archbishop José S. Palma and Bishop Ruperto Santos, in the presence of Apostolic Nuncio Charles John Brown who read and delivered the Pontifical Mandate. The rite of canonical possession-installation was solemnly held at the Gumaca Cathedral of San Diego de Alcala on January 4, 2025.

== Ordinaries ==
Bishop		Period of Tenure	Coat of Arms
1.	Emilio Zurbano Marquez	15 Dec 1984 - 4 May 2002, Appointed as Coadjutor Bishop of Lucena	
2.	Buenaventura Malayo Famadico	11 Jun 2003 - 2 Mar 2013, Appointed as Bishop of San Pablo	
3.	Victor de la Cruz Ocampo	3 Sept 2015–16 March 2023, Died in office	
4.	Euginius Longakit Cañete	04 Jan 2025–present	

== Affiliated Bishops ==
- Jose Francisco Oliveros, 2nd Bishop of the Diocese of Boac from 2000-2004 and 4th Bishop of the Diocese of Malolos from 2004 until his death in 2018.

== Gallery ==
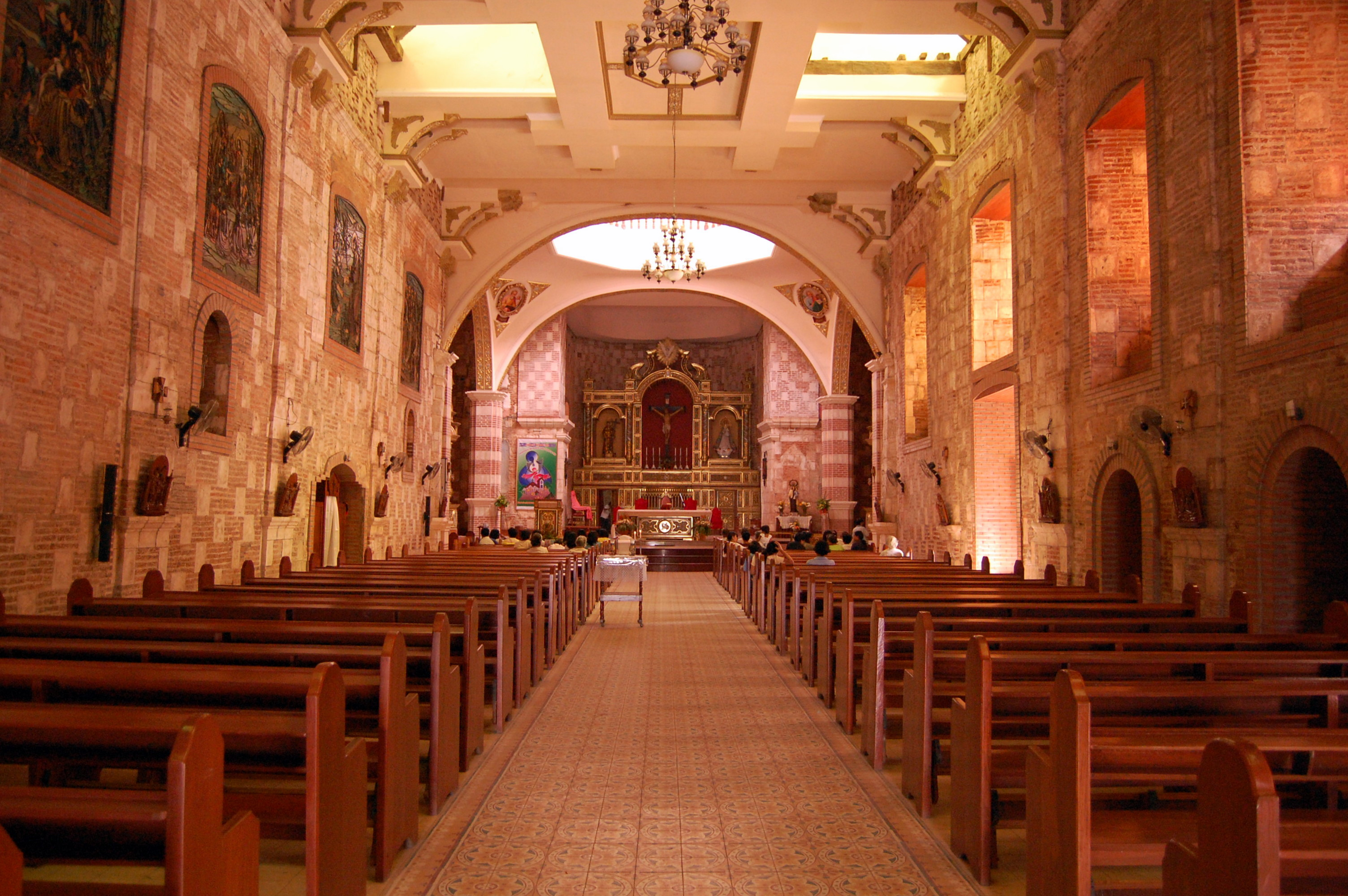
Interior of the Cathedral-Parish of San Diego of Alcala in Gumaca

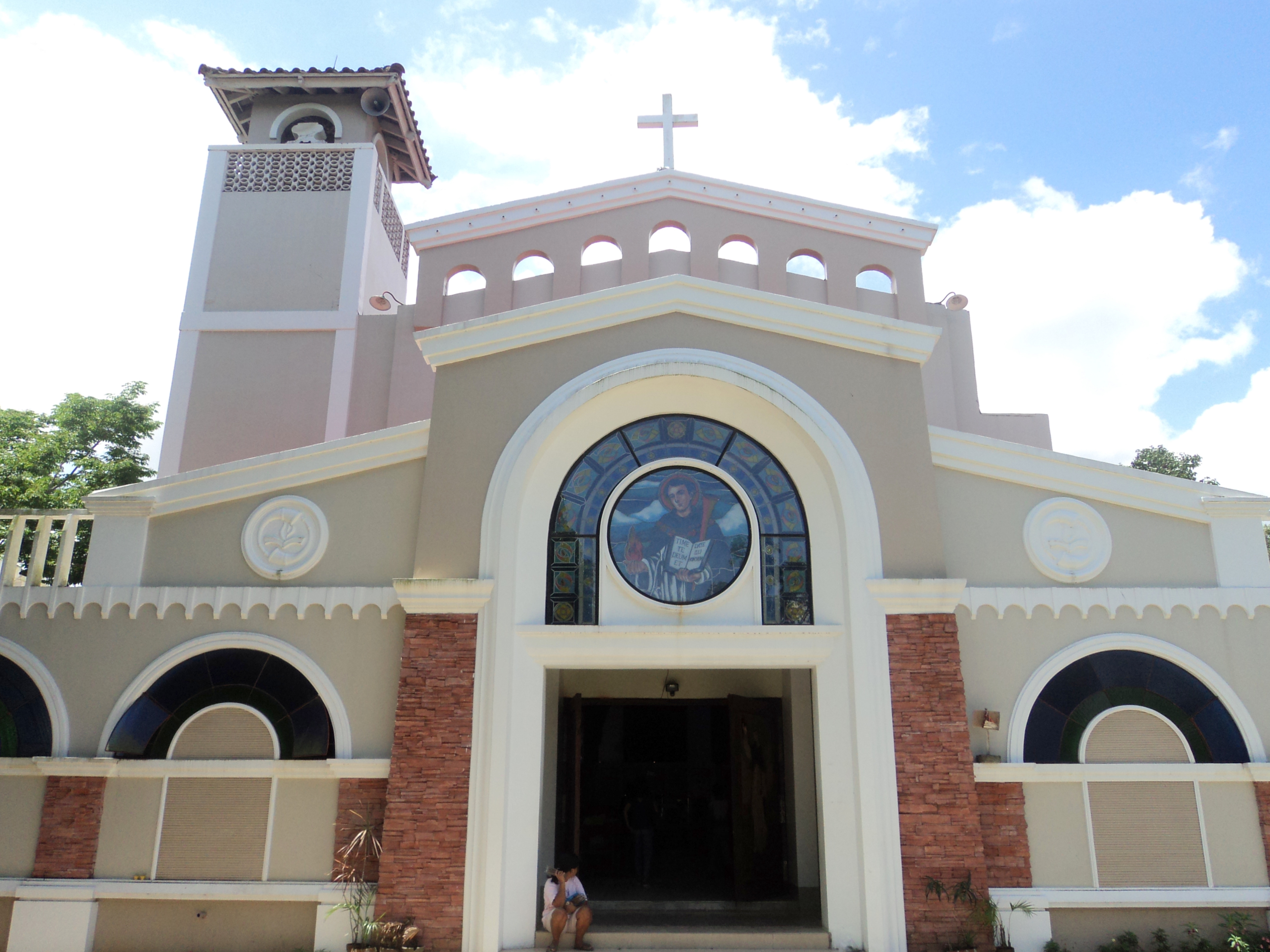
Diocesan Shrine and Parish of St. Vincent Ferrer in San Vicente, Gumaca

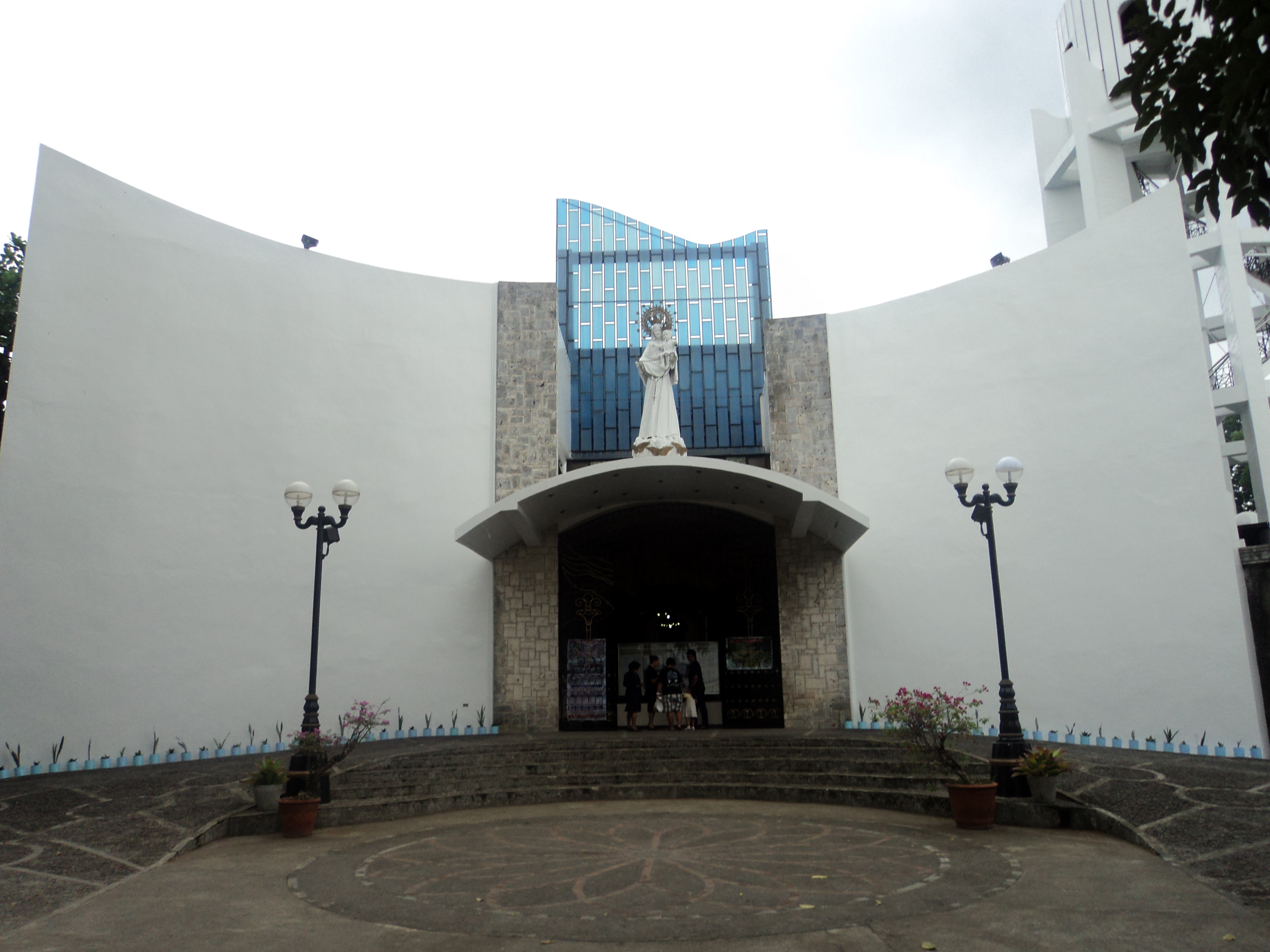
Our Lady of the Holy Rosary Parish in Lopez

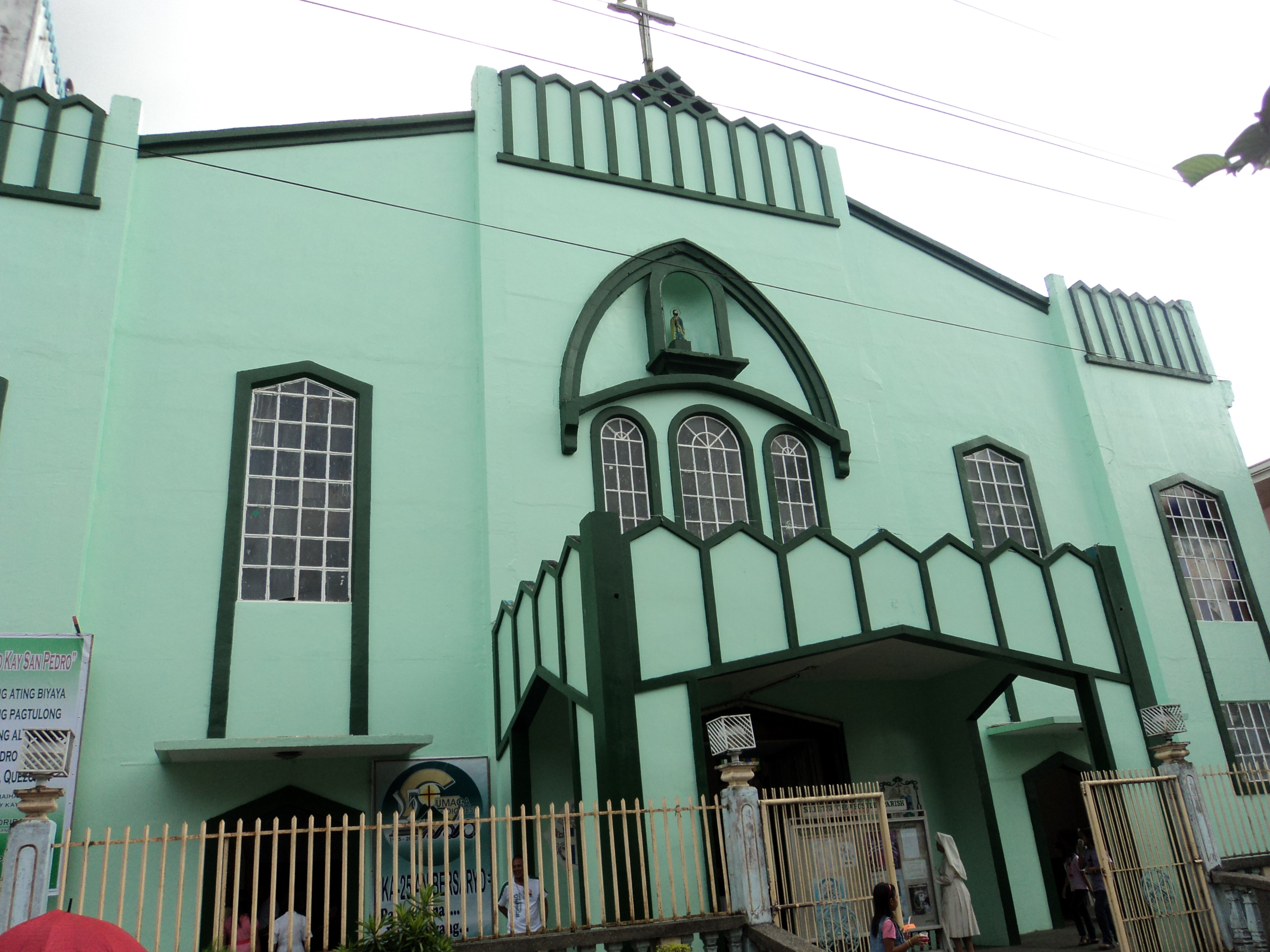
St. Peter the Apostle Parish in Calauag

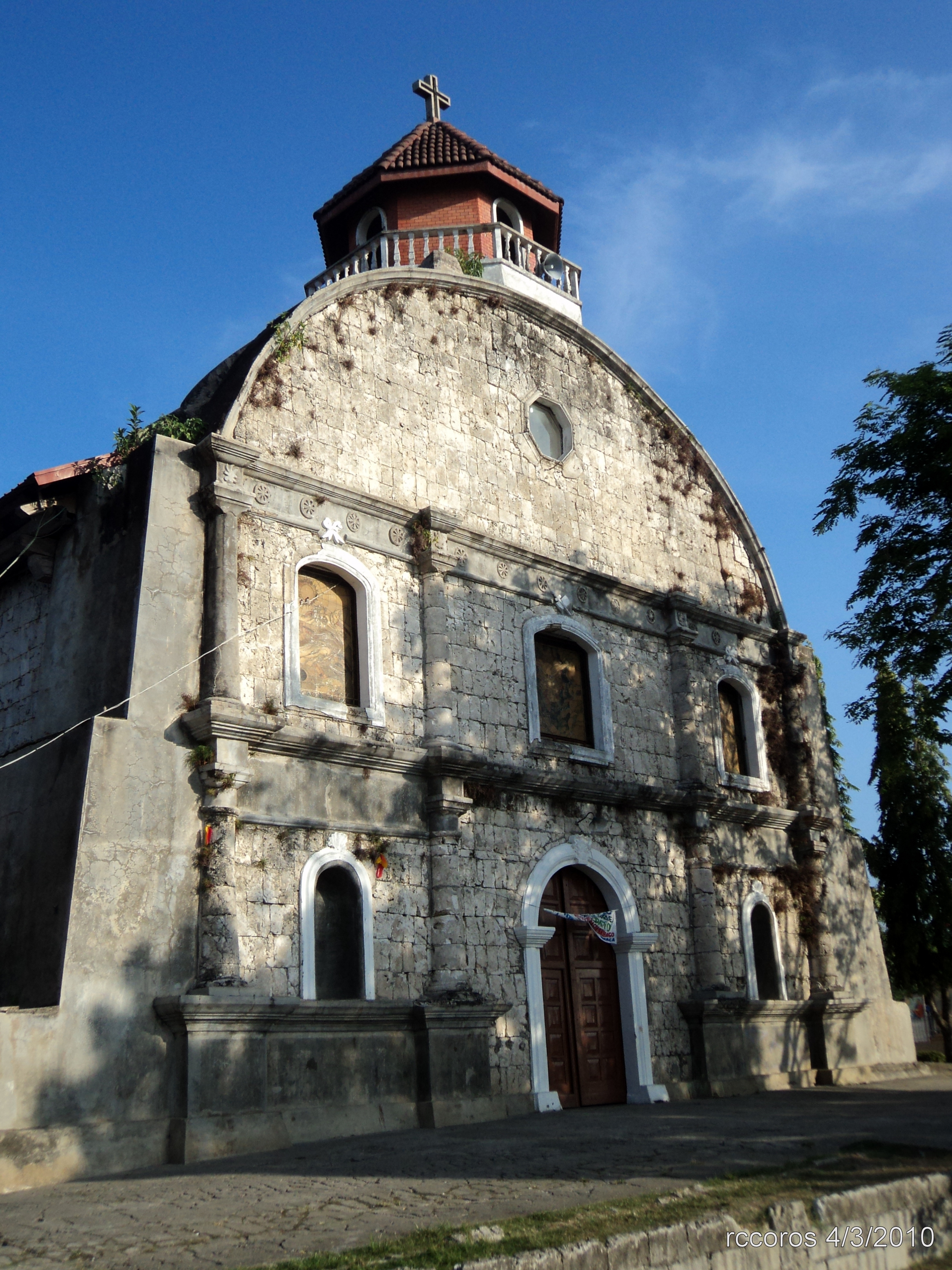
Conversion of St. Paul Parish in Pitogo

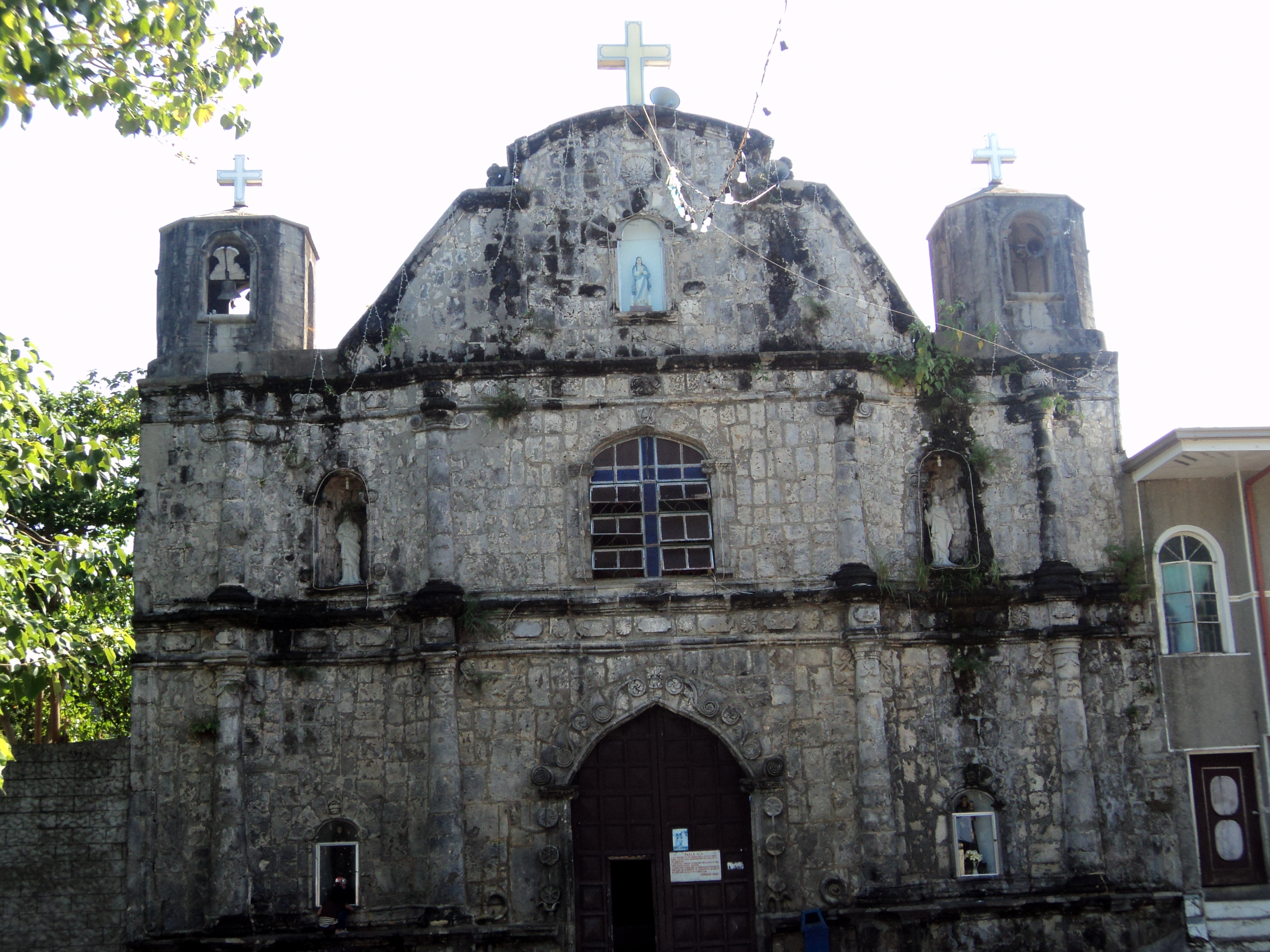
Immaculate Conception Parish in Macalelon

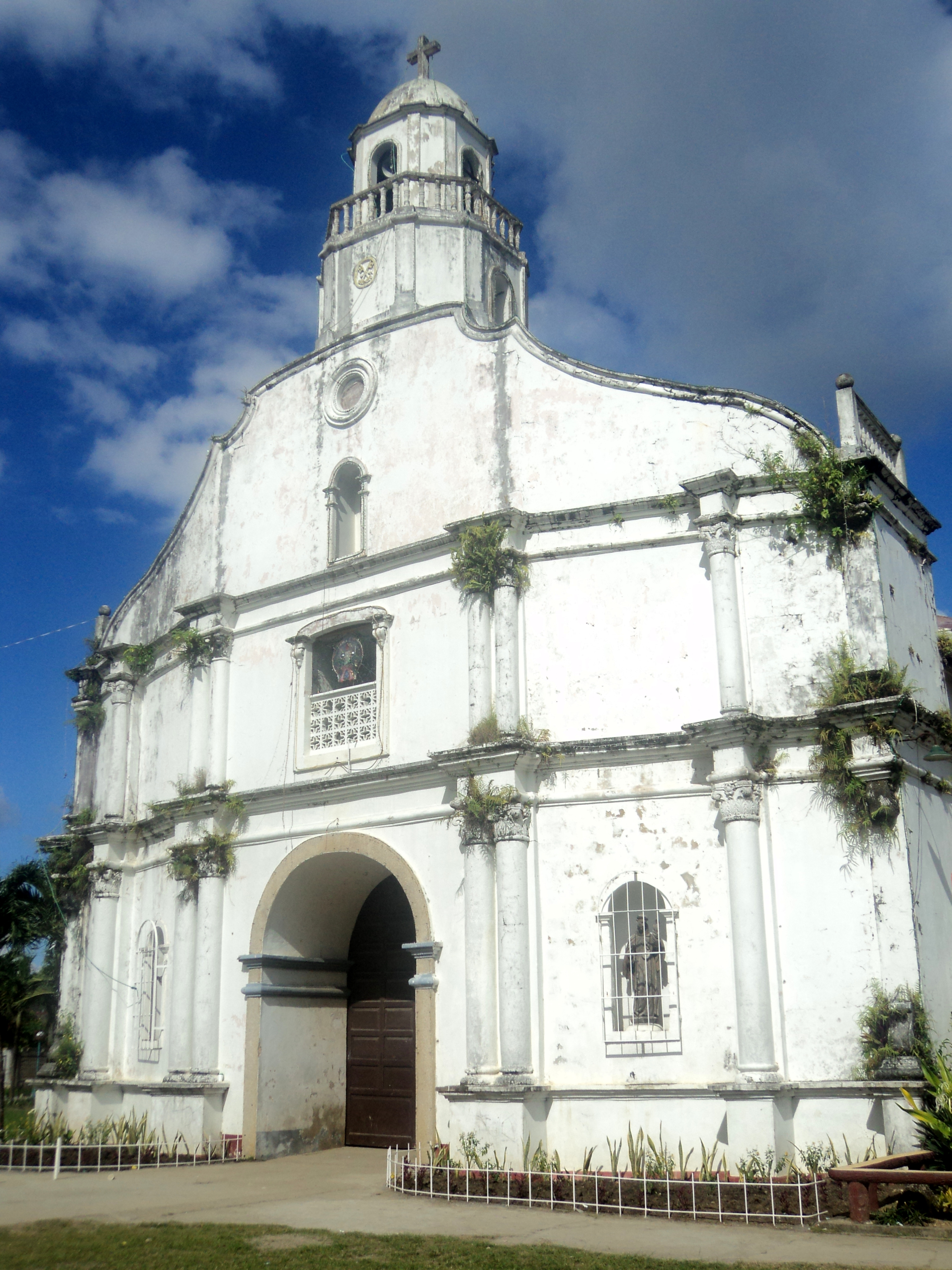
St. Peter the Apostle Parish in Mulanay

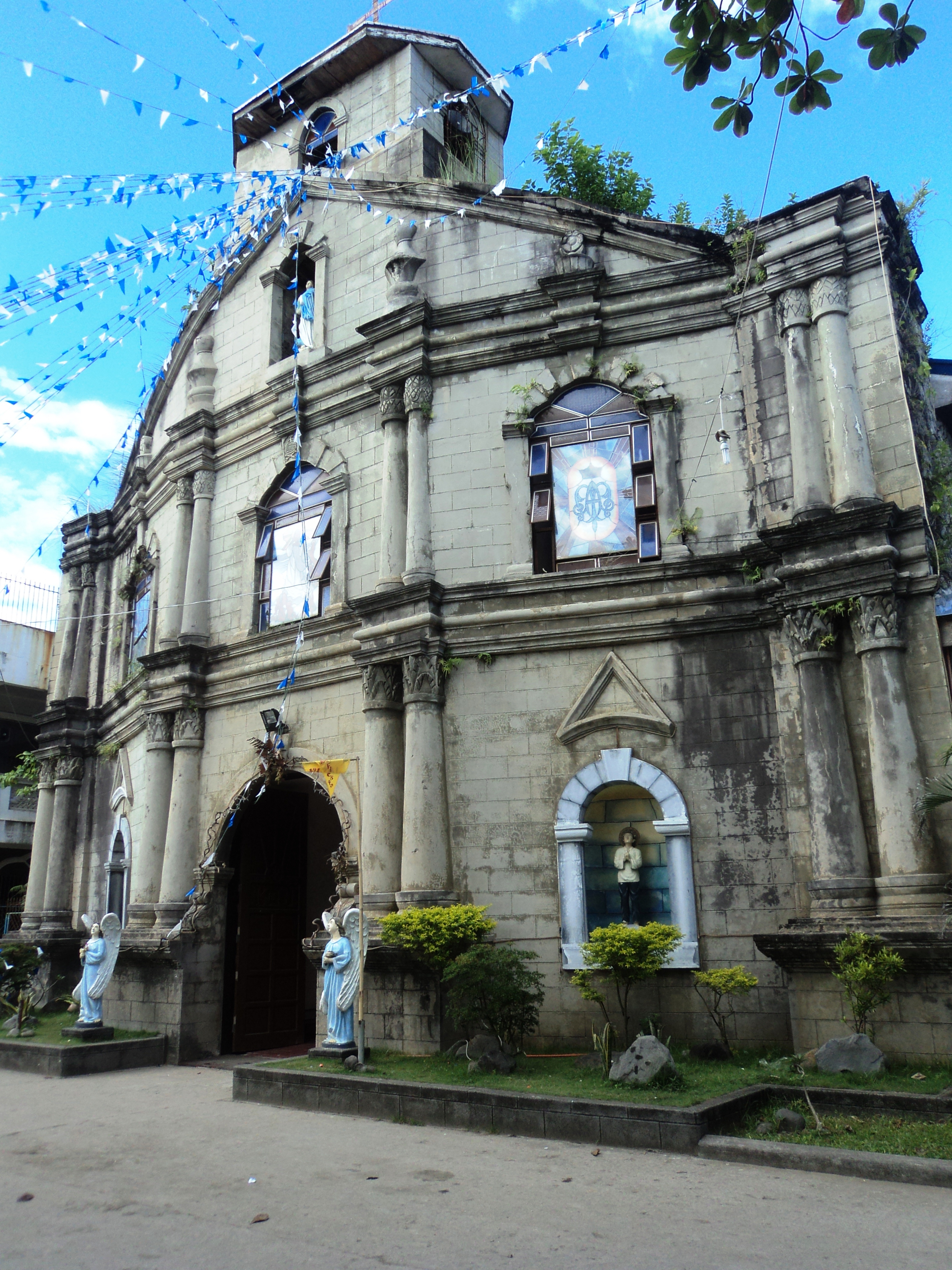
Immaculate Conception Parish in Catanauan

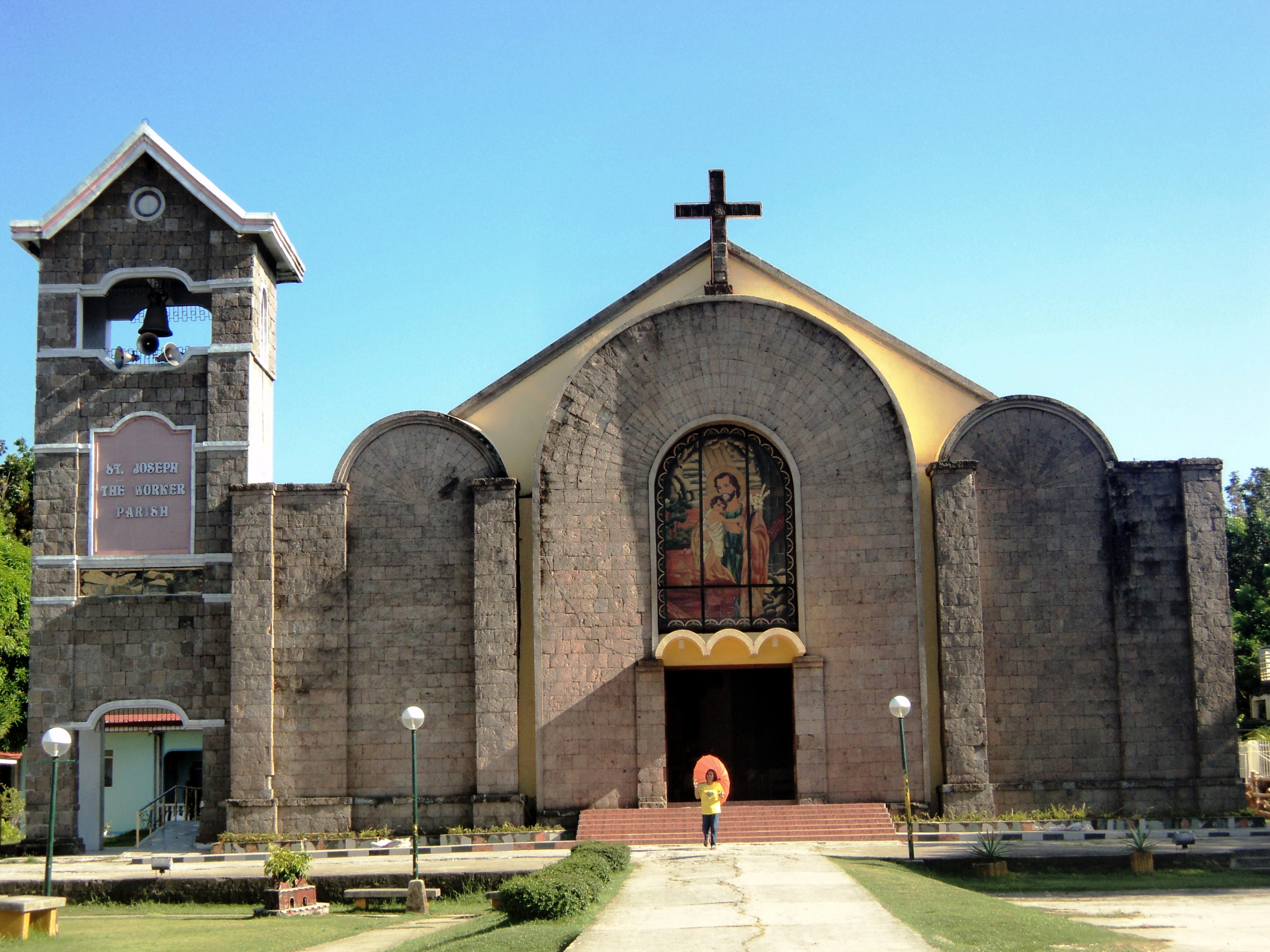
St. Joseph the Worker Parish in San Narciso

== See also ==
- Catholic Church in the Philippines
