= Gumaca =

Municipality in Quezon, Philippines

- Municipality
- Municipality of Gumaca
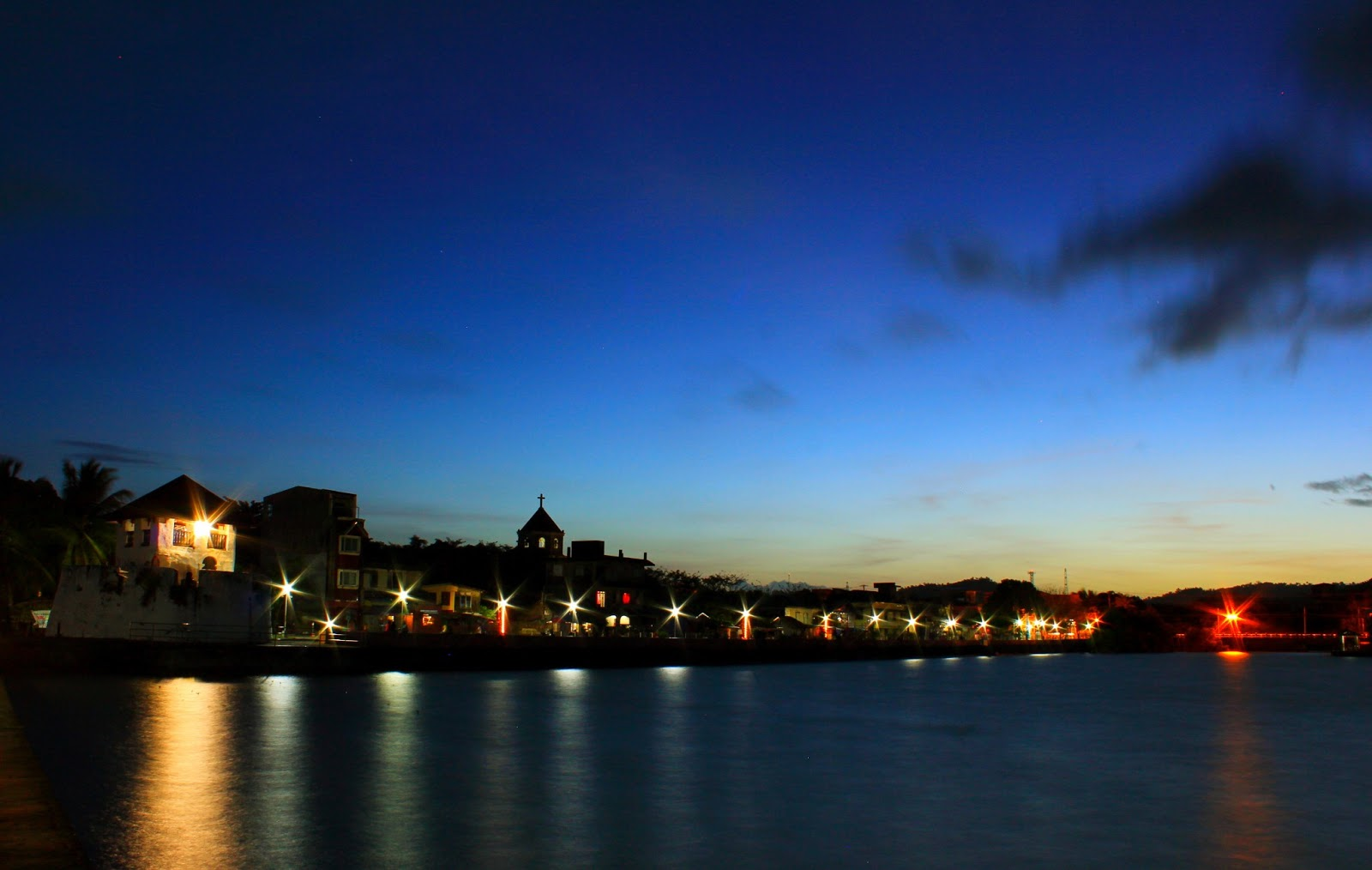
- Muralla Boulevard at the mouth of Pipisik River

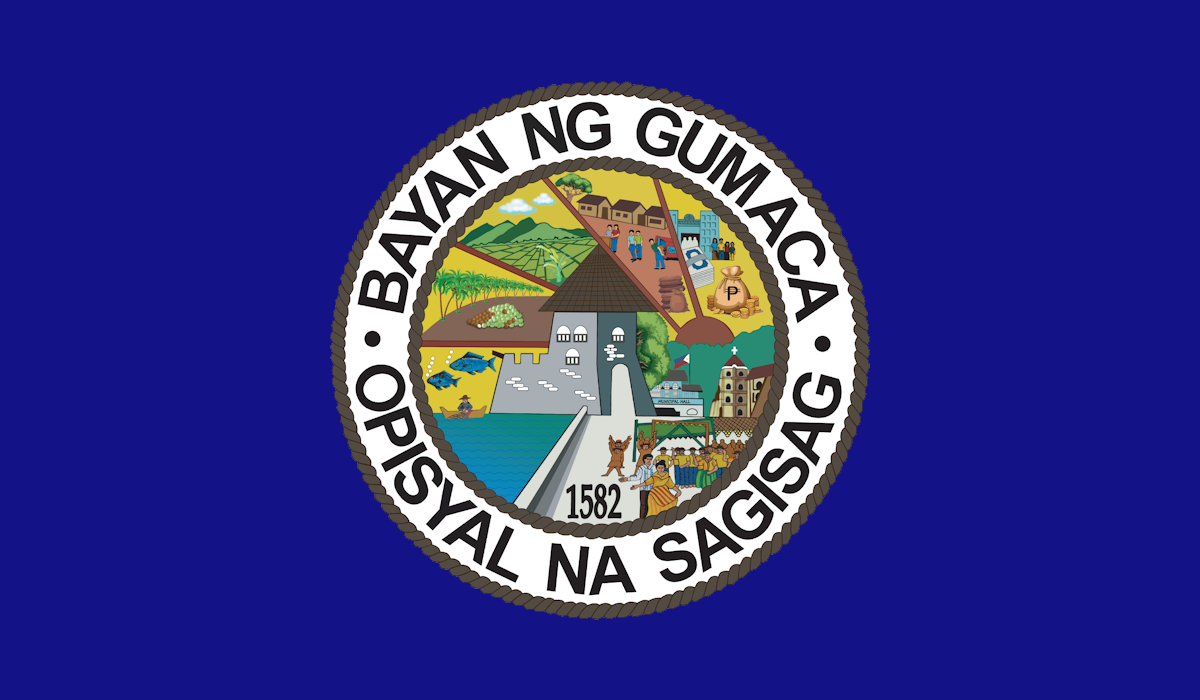
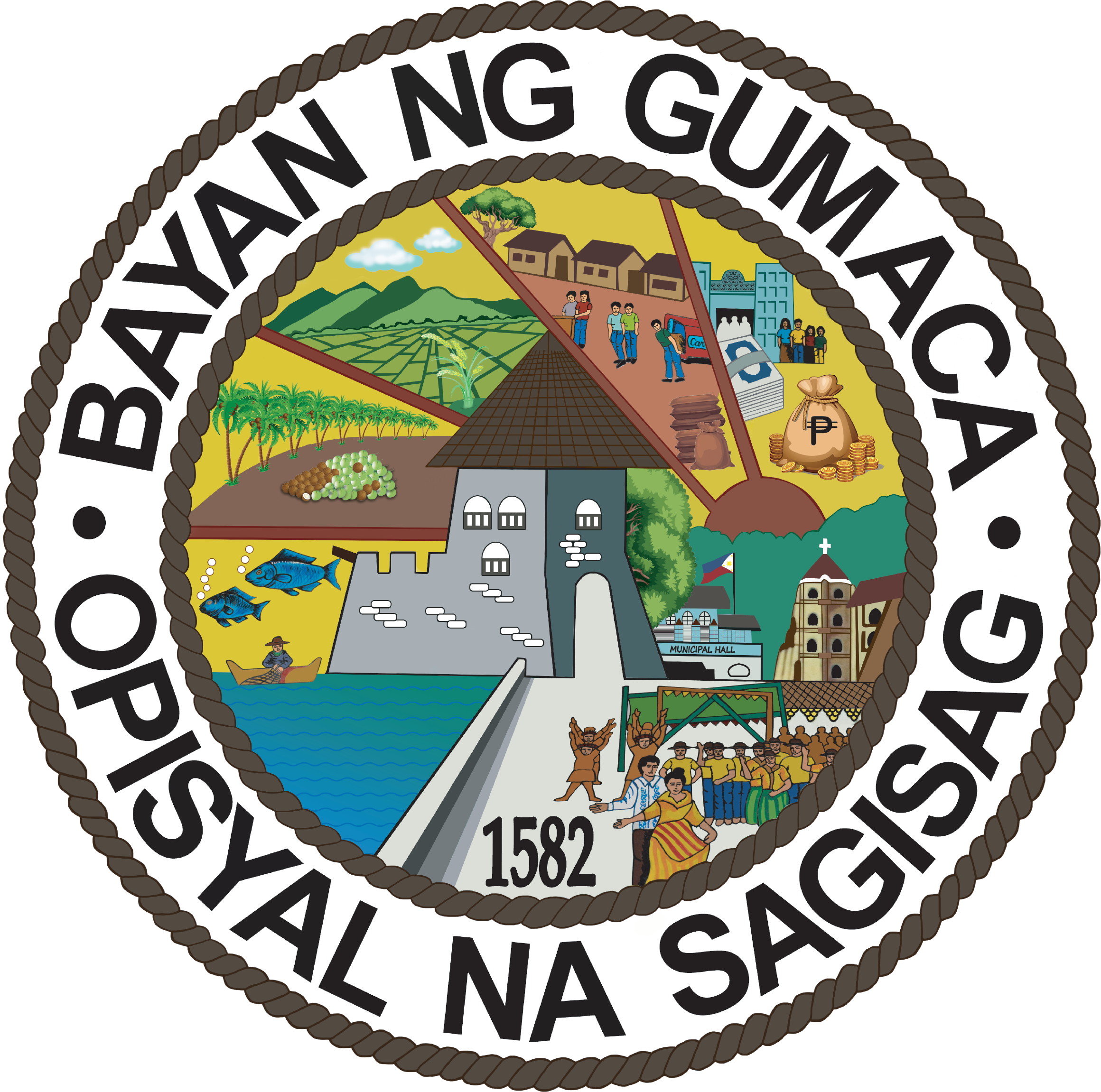
- Flag Seal

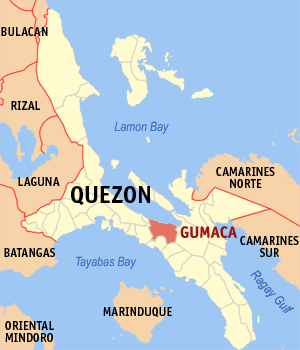
- Map of Quezon with Gumaca highlighted
- Interactive map of Gumaca
- Location within the Philippines
- Coordinates: 13°55′16″N 122°06′01″E
- Country: Philippines
- Region: Calabarzon
- Province: Quezon
- District: 4th district
- Founded: November 13, 1582
- Barangays: 59 (see Barangays)

Government
  - Type: Sangguniang Bayan
  - Mayor: Webster D. Letargo
  - Vice Mayor: Rico J. Bañal
  - Representative: Keith Micah DL. Tan
  - Municipal Council: Members: Jan Carlo C. Mendoza; Jeric Allen Uy Teng; Raquel M. Mendoza; Elchor P. Caralian; Espedito F. Sibal; John Genmar L. Ylagan; Ronald Aldwin C. Cortes; Ruvilon Juancho T. Mercurio
  - Electorate: 44,765 voters (2025)

Area
  - Total: 189.65 km^{2} (73.22 sq mi)
- Elevation: 38 m (125 ft)
- Highest elevation: 181 m (594 ft)
- Lowest elevation: 0 m (0 ft)

Population (2024 census)
  - Total: 72,454
  - Density: 382.04/km^{2} (989.48/sq mi)
  - Households: 19,260
- Demonym: Gumacahin / Gumaqueño

Economy
  - Income class: 1st municipal income class
  - Poverty incidence: 5.39% (2023)
  - Revenue: ₱ 334.4 million (2024)
  - Assets: ₱ 753.8 million (2024)
  - Expenditure: ₱ 320.3 million (2024)
  - Liabilities: ₱ 158.1 million (2024)

Service provider
  - Electricity: Quezon 1 Electric Cooperative (QUEZELCO 1)
- Time zone: UTC+8 (PST)
- ZIP code: 4307
- PSGC: 0405619000
- IDD : area code: +63 (0)42
- Native languages: Tagalog
- Website: gumaca.gov.ph

Gumaca, officially the Municipality of Gumaca (Tagalog: Bayan ng Gumaca), is a municipality in the province of Quezon, Philippines. According to the 2024 census, it has a population of 72,454 people.

== History ==
Formerly known as Bumaka (meaning "the one who fought"), the town of Gumaca was a settlement founded at the southern bank of Palanas River in the 14th century. The earliest known ruler was Lakan Bugtali.

Gumaca, one of the oldest towns in Quezon Province and only several years younger than the “Noble and Ever Loyal City of Manila”, was already a well-established community even before the Spaniards came. The community had a barangay government as early as the 14th century, Lakan Bugtali being the earliest ruler according to oral tradition and Lakan Gitingan being the last. The Barangay had for its territory much of the areas now under the territorial jurisdiction of the municipalities of Atimonan, Plaridel, Lopez, Calauag, Alabat, Perez, Quezon, Unisan, Pitogo, Guinayangan and Macalelon. Located at the mouth of what is now known as Pipisik River and nestling at the foot of Sierra Madre range, it was-as it is now-also the center of local trade and commerce.

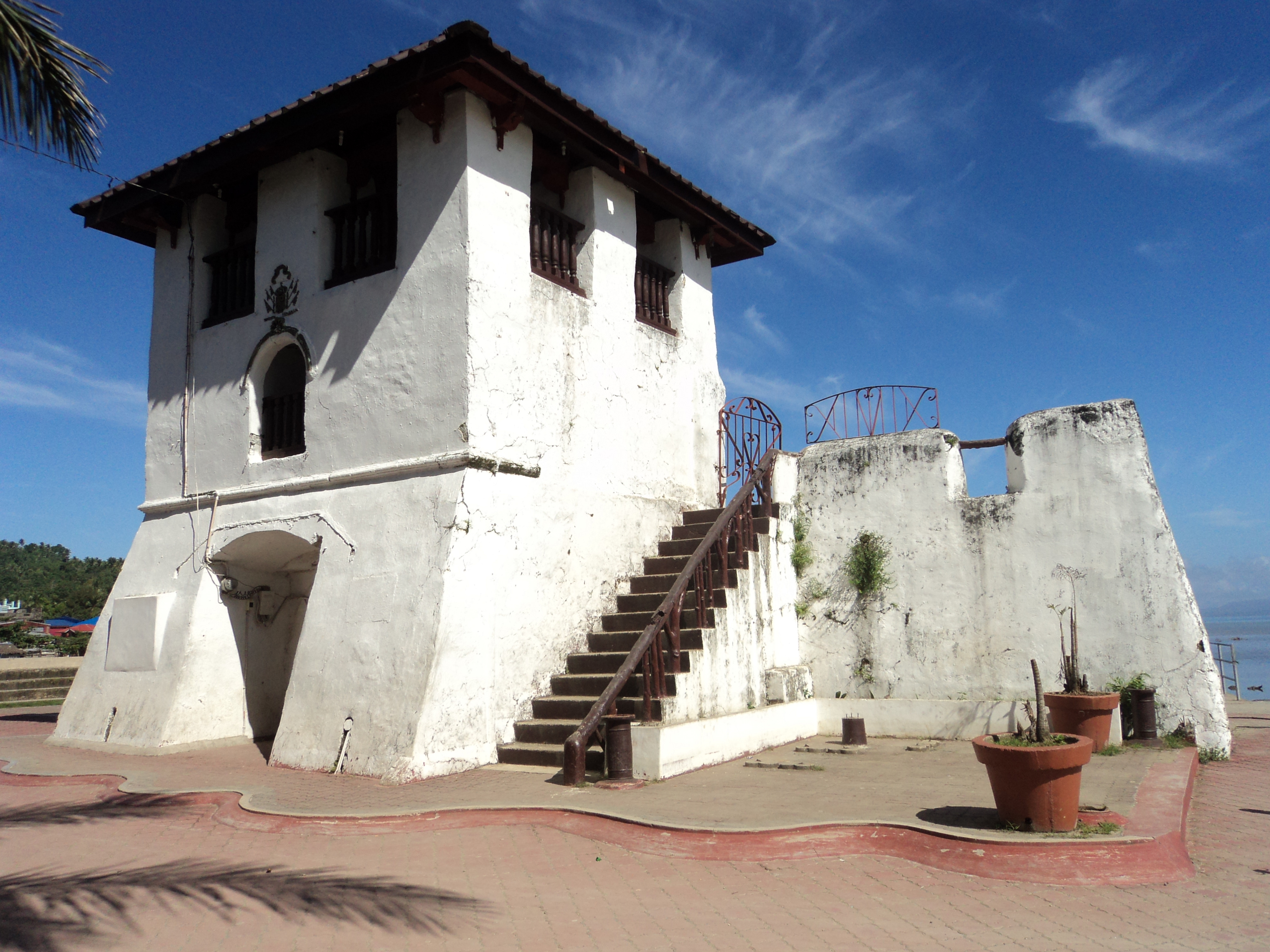
Kutang San Diego, a National Cultural Treasure

It is perhaps because of this Franciscan friar, Fray Diego de Oropesa, first set foot in the community and introduced Christianity to the people with St. Diego de Alcala being proclaimed as the pueblo’s patron saint. In 1582, the first “visita” was erected and 1686 marked the establishment of a full-pledged town with independent (civil) government, the earlier ones having been headed by the ever-present Spanish friars (the municipality boasts of a still complete line-up of chief executives from 1574 down to the present).

In September 1960, Mayor Cesar A. Angulo and municipal secretary Saturnino Cortes joined the Nacionalista Party by taking an oath before President Carlos P. Garcia.

From the early 1980s to the 1990s, there were calls to rename the town as Tañada, after nationalist and past Senator Lorenzo Tañada, with his son Wigberto Tañada proposing to have a poll once elected congressman of Quezon's fourth district; the renaming eventually did not push through.

== Geography ==
Gumaca is located at the mouth of what is now known as Pipisik River at the foot of the Sierra Madre range. It is 66 kilometres (41 mi) from Lucena and 196 kilometres (122 mi) from Manila.

=== Barangays ===
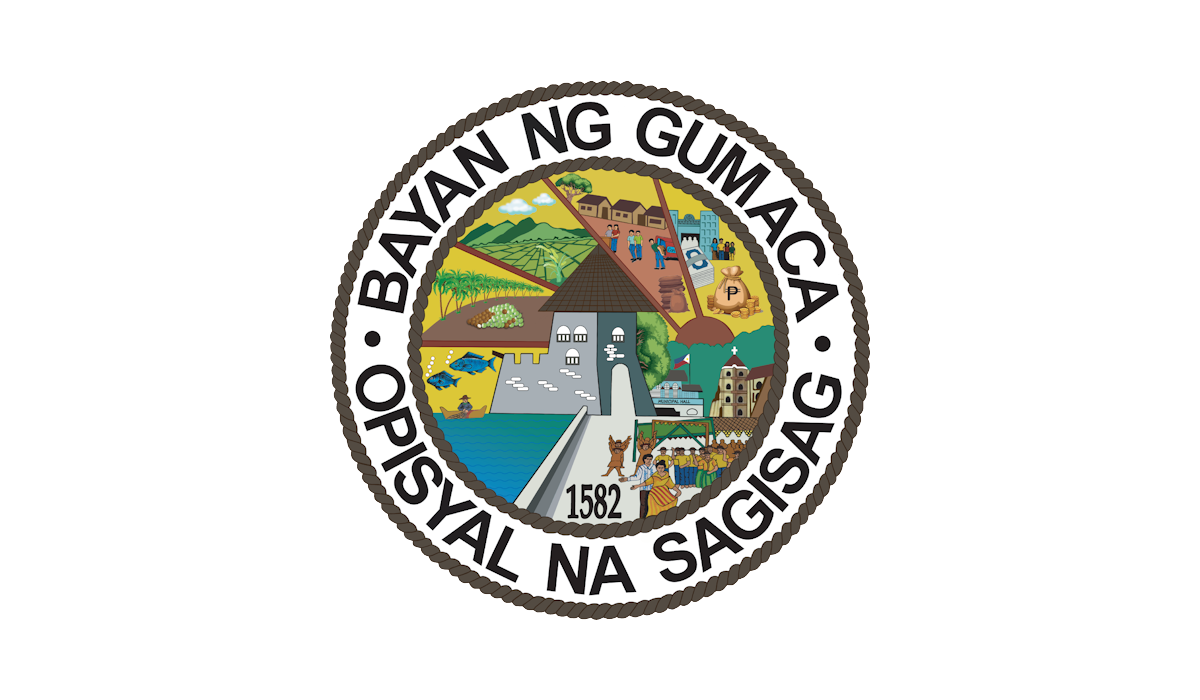
Former flag of Gumaca

Gumaca is politically subdivided into 59 barangays, as indicated below. Each barangay consists of puroks and some have sitios.

- Adia Bitaog
- Anonangin
- Bagong Buhay (Poblacion)
- Bamban
- Bantad
- Batong Dalig
- Biga
- Binambang
- Buensuceso
- Bungahan
- Butaguin
- Calumangin
- Camohaguin
- Casasahan Ibaba
- Casasahan Ilaya
- Cawayan
- Gayagayaan
- Gitnang Barrio
- Hardinan
- Inaclagan
- Inagbuhan Ilaya
- Hagakhakin
- Labnig
- Laguna
- Lagyo
- Mabini(Poblacion)
- Mabunga
- Malabtog
- Manlayaan
- Marcelo H. Del Pilar
- Mataas Na Bundok
- Maunlad (Poblacion)
- Pagsabangan
- Panikihan
- Peñafrancia (Poblacion)
- Pipisik (Poblacion)
- Progreso
- Rizal (Poblacion)
- Rosario
- San Agustin
- San Diego (Poblacion)
- San Diego (Bukid)
- San Isidro Kanluran
- San Isidro Silangan
- San Juan De Jesus
- San Vicente
- Sastre
- Tabing Dagat (Poblacion)
- Tumayan
- Villa Arcaya
- Villa Bota
- Villa Fuerte
- Villa Mendoza
- Villa Nava
- Villa Padua
- Villa Perez
- Villa Principe
- Villa Tañada
- Villa Victoria

=== Climate ===
Climate data for Gumaca, Quezon
Month	Jan	Feb	Mar	Apr	May	Jun	Jul	Aug	Sep	Oct	Nov	Dec	Year
Mean daily maximum °C (°F)	26 (79)	27 (81)	29 (84)	31 (88)	31 (88)	30 (86)	29 (84)	29 (84)	29 (84)	29 (84)	28 (82)	26 (79)	29 (84)
Mean daily minimum °C (°F)	22 (72)	22 (72)	22 (72)	23 (73)	24 (75)	24 (75)	24 (75)	24 (75)	24 (75)	24 (75)	23 (73)	23 (73)	23 (74)
Average precipitation mm (inches)	83 (3.3)	55 (2.2)	44 (1.7)	37 (1.5)	90 (3.5)	123 (4.8)	145 (5.7)	125 (4.9)	135 (5.3)	166 (6.5)	163 (6.4)	152 (6.0)	1,318 (51.8)
Average rainy days	15.1	10.8	11.9	11.4	19.9	23.7	26.3	23.9	23.9	22.1	20.2	18.6	227.8
Source: Meteoblue

== Demographics ==
Population census of Gumaca
Year	Pop.	±% p.a.
1903	5,324	—
1918	7,540	+2.35%
1939	12,904	+2.59%
1948	19,131	+4.47%
1960	27,284	+3.00%
1970	36,366	+2.91%
1975	39,337	+1.59%
1980	42,143	+1.39%
1990	48,189	+1.35%
1995	53,568	+2.00%
2000	60,191	+2.53%
2007	63,778	+0.80%
2010	69,618	+3.24%
2015	73,877	+1.14%
2020	71,942	−0.56%
Source: Philippine Statistics Authority

== Economy ==
Poverty incidence of Gumaca (%)

Source: Philippine Statistics Authority

== Transportation ==
=== By land ===
The municipality is connected with Manila by the Pan-Philippine Highway and daily rail services to and from Naga & Legazpi are provided by the Philippine National Railways.

In order to spur development in the municipality, The Toll Regulatory Board declared Toll Road 5 the extension of South Luzon Expressway. A 420-kilometer, four lane expressway starting from the terminal point of the now under construction SLEX Toll Road 4 at Barangay Mayao, Lucena City in Quezon to Matnog, Sorsogon, near the Matnog Ferry Terminal. On August 25, 2020, San Miguel Corporation announced that they will invest the project which will reduce travel time from Lucena to Matnog from 9 hours to 5.5 hours.

On June 3, 2022, the Department of Transportation and San Miguel Corporation signed a Supplemental Toll Operations Agreement (STOA) for SLEX Toll Road 5 which was approved by then President Rodrigo Duterte 24 days later.

Another expressway that will serve Gumaca is the Quezon-Bicol Expressway (QuBEx), which will link between Lucena and San Fernando, Camarines Sur.

== San Diego de Alcala Cathedral ==
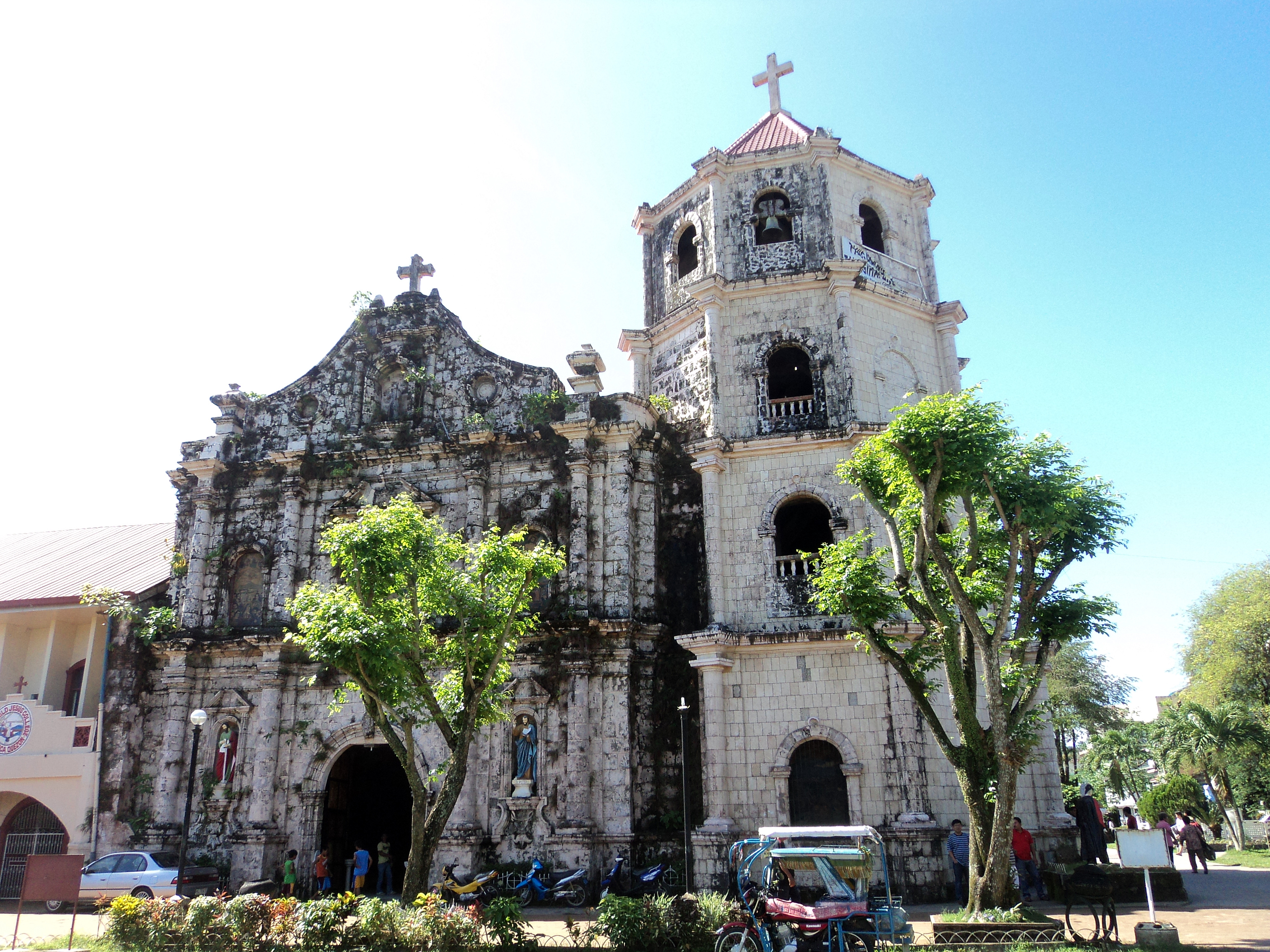
San Diego de Alcala Cathedral, the seat of the Diocese of Gumaca

The San Diego de Alcala Cathedral is the seat of the Diocese of Gumaca and is considered as the largest cathedral in Quezon, founded as early as 1582 as a visita by the Franciscan friars. The cathedral is under the patronage of Saint Didacus of Alcala (San Diego in Spanish).

== Government ==
=== Local government ===
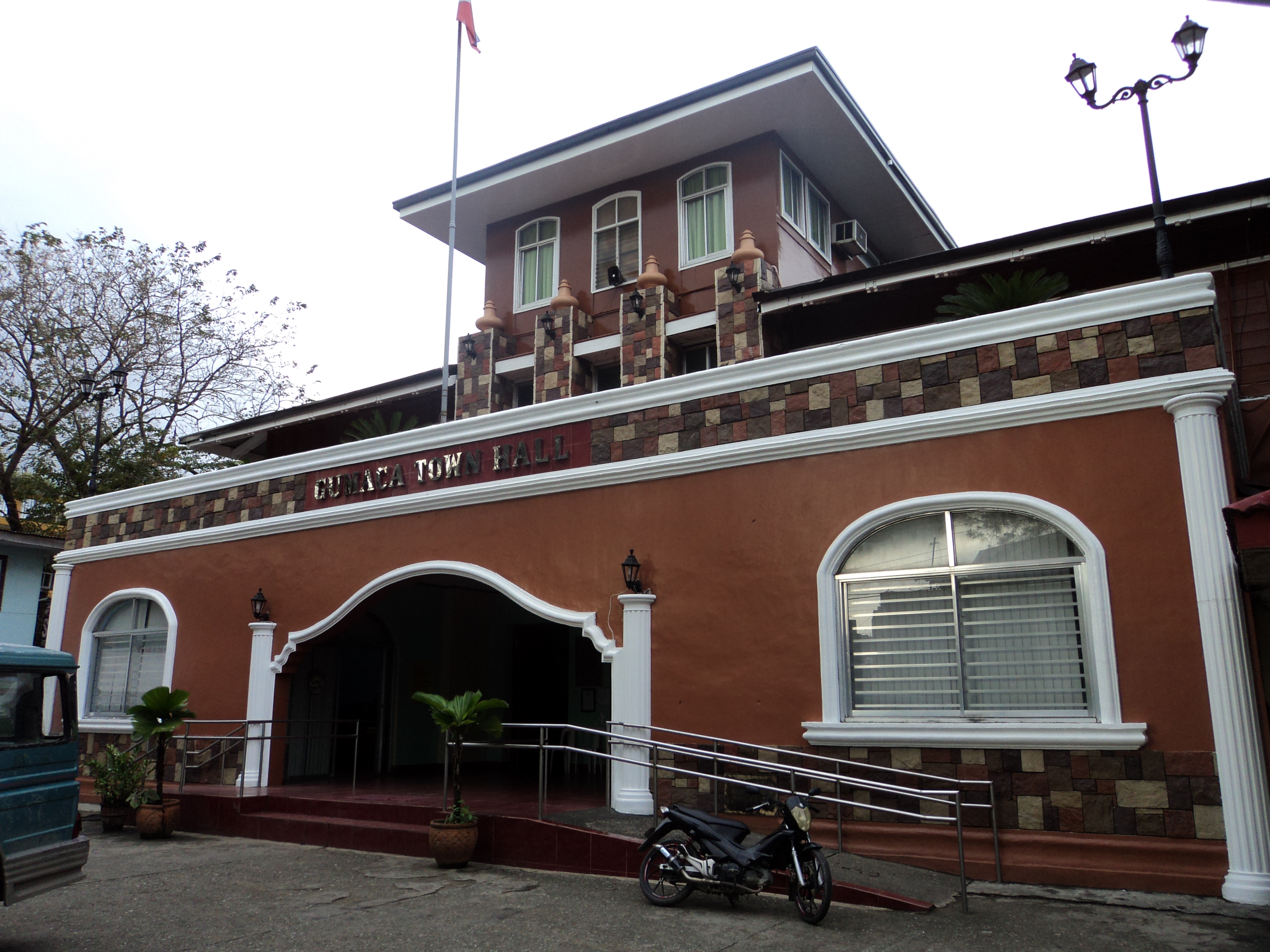
Gumaca Town Hall

- Mayor: Webster Letargo

=== Municipal mayors ===
From the discovery in 1574 and official foundation of Gumaca in 1582, Franciscan Friars have been the Town Heads:

- Sr. Padre Diego de Oropesa (1574–1587)
- Sr. Padre Esteban Ortiz (1588–1598)
- Sr. Padre Geronimo Monte (1599–1622)
- Sr. Padre Gabriel Santo Tomas (1623–1637)
- Sr. Padre Marcelo de la Guardia (1638–1661)
- Sr. Padre Celestino de San Miguel (1662–1670)

From 1671, Gobernadorcillos are the Heads of Town dof Gumaca (Spanish period): (Mostly composed of Dynasties of Hispanic-Filipino Families)

- Don Diego Jose (1671–1672)
- Don Francisco Santa Maria (1673–1676)
- Don Pedro De Castro (1677–1679)
- Don Simon Prada (1680–1681)
- Don Mariano De Dios (1682)
- Don Jose San Agustin (1683)
- Don Santiago Abra (1684)
- Don Felix Gimenos (1684–1685)
- Don Juan Adriano (1686)
- Don Antonio Lopez (1686)
- Don Juan San Buenaventura (1687–1688)
- Don Jose Ajan de Vera (1689)
- Don Buenaventura dela Cruz (1690)
- Don Diego Martinez Polintan (1690)
- Don Manuel Cuello (1691)
- Don Don Gregorio Dandan (1692)
- Don Nicolas Sarmiento (1693)
- Don Francisco de Victoria (1694)
- Don Francisco Martinez (1695–1696)
- Don Juan Cabig (1697)
- Don Gaspar Catapang (1698)
- Don Francisco Escobar (1698–1699)
- Don Marcos Frias (1700)
- Don Pedro Talavera (1701)
- Don Francisco Martinez (1702)
- Don Diego Martinez Polonio (1703)
- Don Diego Salvador (1704)
- Don Francisco Cortez (1705)
- Don Antonio Santa Maria (1706)
- Don Pedro Talavera (1707)
- Don Francisco de Victoria (1708)
- Don Diego Martinez Polonio (1709)
- Don Pedro Talavera (1710)
- Don Buenaventura Delos Santos (1711)
- Don Francisco Clemente (1712)
- Don Juan Bautista (1712)
- Don Francisco Salvador Martinez (1713)
- Don Alejo Alonzo de Victoria (1714)
- Don Antonio Catapang (1715)
- Don Pedro Gimenes (1716)
- Don Francisco Clemente (1717)
- Don Geronimo Gimenes (1718)
- Don Pedro Almonte (1719)
- Don Pedro Patilo (1720)
- Don Santiago Martinez (1721)
- Don Bartolome Dandan Casadia (1722)
- Don Pedro Talavera (1723)
- Don Antonio Peras Margas (1724)
- Don Jose Pagayanon (1724–1725)
- Don Francisco de Victoria (1725–1727)
- Don Francisco Salvador (1728)
- Don Gregorio Gimenes (1729)
- Don Francisco Cordero (1730)
- Don Juan de Reyes (1731)
- Don Eugenio delos Santos (1732–1733)
- Don Francisco delos Reyes (1734)
- Don Francisco De Leon (1735)
- Don Andres Martinez (1736)
- Don Diego delos Santos (1737)
- Don Miguel delos Reyes (1738)

Presidentes Municipal (American period)

- Don Donato T. Arcaya (1901–1903) (First elected Presidente Municipal de Gumaca) Gobernadrocillo Interim (1900)
- Don Carlos Capisonda (1904–1905)
- Don Rafael Castro (1906–1907)
- Don Conrado Oliveros (1908–1909)
- Don Tomas Tañada, Sr. (1909–1912)
- Don Aurelio P. Nava (1912–1916) Son of Gobernadorcillo Don Antonino Nava
- Don Deogracias Tañada (1916–1919)
- Don Panfilo M. Tañada (1919–1923)
- Don Valeriano Arcaya (1923–1925) Son of Presidente Don Donato Arcaya
- Don Marciano Linay Principe (1925–1928)
- Don Don Eriberto Caparros (1928–1931)
- Don Francisco Omaña (1931–1934)
- Don Vicente M. Mendoza (1934–1939)

Japanese Occupation (1942–1946)

- Sr. Juan R. Tañada (1940–1946)
- Don Vicente D. Victoria (1946–1951) Son of Gobernadorcillo Don Pedro Victoria

After the Liberation, the Head of Town has been changed to Municipal Mayor:

- Sr. Mariano M. Tañada, Sr. (1952–1959) Son of Gobernadorcillo Don Vicente Tañada
- Dr. Cesar A. Angulo (1960–1963)
- Don Tomas C. Tañada, Jr. (1964–1967) Son of Presidente Don Tomas Tañada, Sr.

Martial Law Era: (1972–1981):

- Engr. Teodosio V. Principe (1968–1979) Son of Presidente Don Marciano Principe
- Col. Robert T. Yap-Diangco (1980–1986)

After EDSA People Power I: (1986):

- Cirilo M. Tañada (1986–1995) Son of Mayor Mariano M. Tañada, Sr.
- Col. Rodolfo B. Caralian (7/1/1995-8/16/1995) Died during his term of office
- Juanito B. Bañal (1995–2007)
- Engr. Joy Job Arcaya Cabangon (2007–2010)
- Engr. Erwin P. Caralian (2010–2019) Son of Mayor Col. Rodolfo Caralian
- Webster Letargo (2019 present)

== Education ==
There are two schools district offices which govern all educational institutions within the municipality. They oversee the management and operations of all private and public, from primary to secondary schools. These are the Gumaca East Schools District, and Gumaca West Schools District.

=== Primary and elementary schools ===
- Anonangin Elementary school
- Bamban Elementary school
- Bantad-Villafuerte Elementary school
- Biga-Labnig Elementary school
- Binambang Elementary school
- Calumangin Elementary school
- Camohaguin Elementary school
- Casasahan Elementary school
- Cawayan Elementary school
- Creative Genius Montessori Learning Center
- Gayagayaan Elementary school
- Gumaca East Central Elementary school
- Gumaca Institute of Learning
- Gumaca Integrated School
- Gumaca West Central Elementary school
- Hagakhakin Elementary school
- Kid's Light Foundation Learning Center
- Lagyo Elementary school
- Linkage South Learning Center
- Mabunga Elementary school
- Pagsabangan Elementary school
- Panikihan Elementary school
- Plaza Rizal Elementary school
- Progreso Elementary school
- Roosevelt Elementary school
- Rosario Elementary school
- Saint Didacus Institute
- Sastre Elementary school
- Villa Arcaya Elementary school
- Villa Bota Elementary school
- Villa Padua Elementary school
- Villa Perez Elementary school
- Villa Victoria Elementary school

=== Secondary schools ===
- Bantad National High School
- Camohaguin National High School
- Gumaca Integrated School
- Gumaca National High School
- Lamon Bay School of Fisheries
- Panikihan National High School
- Villa Perez National High School

=== Higher educational institutions ===
- ACEBA Systems Technology Institute
- Eastern Quezon College
- Holy Child Jesus College
- Philtech Institute of Arts and Technology

== Notable personalities ==
- Erin Tañada – 5th representative of Quezon's 4th congressional district, Liberal Party vice president
- Lorenzo Tañada Sr. – former senator
- Keith Micah Tan – 7th representative of Quezon's 4th congressional district.
- Wigberto Tañada – former Liberal Party president and former senator

== Sister Cities ==
- Zamboanga City
- Makati City
