= Lingayen Co-Cathedral =

Roman Catholic church in Pangasinan, Philippines

- Co-Cathedral Parish of the Epiphany of Our Lord
- Concatedral-Parroquial de la Epifanía de Nuestro Señor (Spanish)
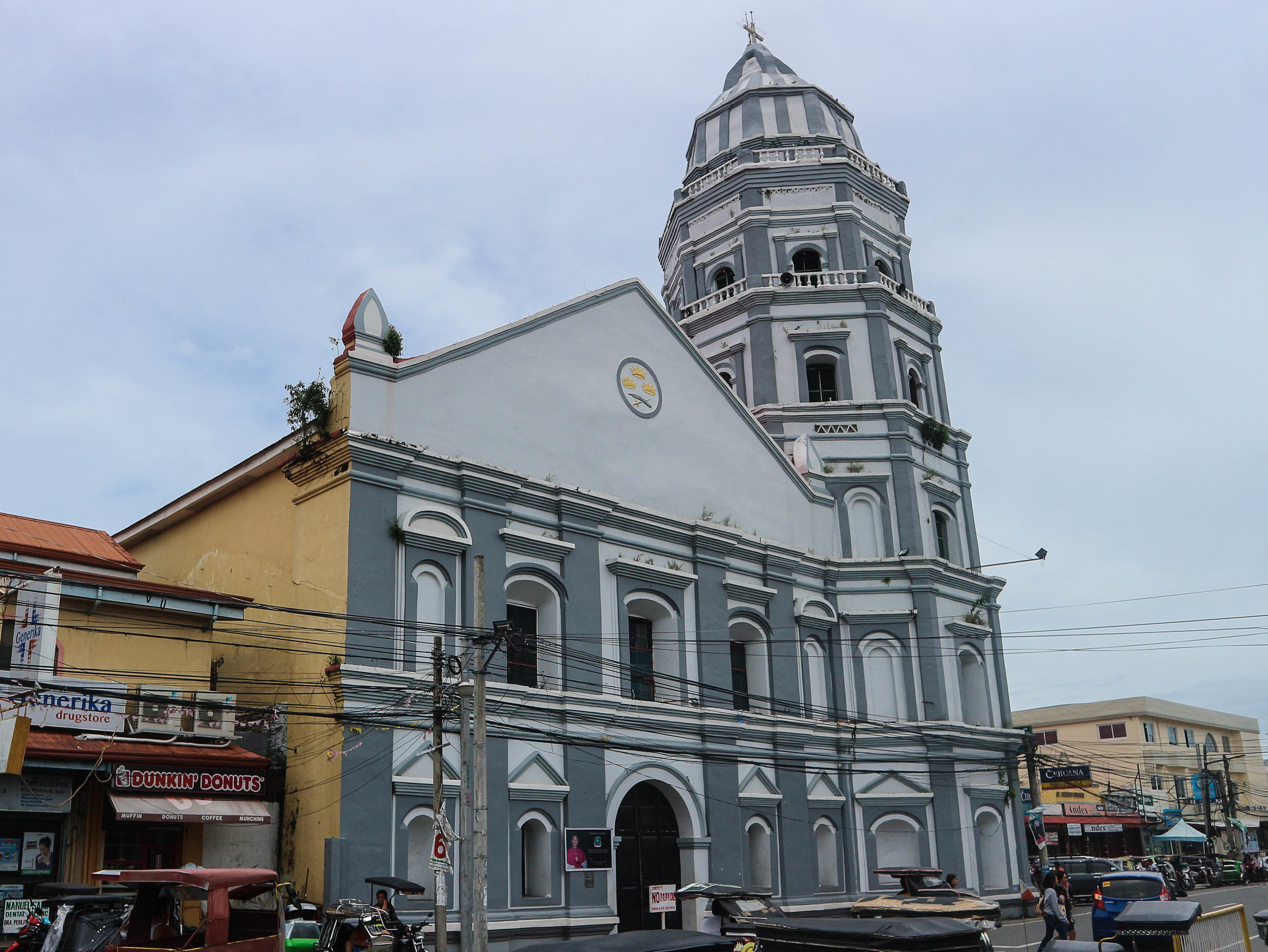
- Lingayen Co-Cathedral in 2019

- Location in Luzon Location in the Philippines
- 16°01′19″N 120°13′53″E
- Location: Lingayen, Pangasinan
- Country: Philippines
- Denomination: Roman Catholic

History
- Status: co-cathedral
- Founder: Augustinian missionaries
- Consecrated: 1587

Architecture
- Functional status: active
- Architect: Father Miguel Aparicio
- Architectural type: Church building
- Style: Neo-Baroque
- Groundbreaking: 1587

Administration
- Archdiocese: Lingayen-Dagupan

Clergy
- Archbishop: Socrates B. Villegas
- Priest(s): Fidelis B. Layog; Camilo V. Natividad; Marlon G. Allam; Wilber Tobe

The Co-Cathedral Parish of the Epiphany of Our Lord, commonly known as Lingayen Church and formerly Los Tres Reyes or Three Kings Parish, is a historic Roman Catholic church and cathedral in Lingayen, Pangasinan in the Philippines. It is under the jurisdiction of the Archdiocese of Lingayen-Dagupan. The church is one of the oldest in the region, founded in 1587 in the same year Saint Dominic Basilica in San Carlos, Pangasinan was also founded. It is famous for its architecture, including a dome designed by Father Miguel Aparicio and its bell tower.

== History ==
The Lingayen Church was founded by Spanish Augustinian missionaries in 1614. The Dominicans ran the church from 1740 until replaced by Filipino priests after the U.S. drove out the Spanish in 1898.

In 1928 the church was elevated to cathedral. Along with its co-cathedral, Metropolitan Cathedral of St. John the Evangelist, it is the Roman Catholic Archdiocese of Lingayen–Dagupan. In 1933, the Columbans began supporting the development of the cathedral and the parish.

The parish was consecrated in 1587 and established in 1616. On May 19, 1928, it became the Diocese of Lingayen.

In 1941 during World War II the Japanese fascist empire invaded the Philippines. During the war the bishop’s palace was ruined, and the parish was partially destroyed. The bishop’s residence was transferred from Lingayen to Dagupan.

The Diocese of Lingayen was reconstituted into the Archdiocese of Lingayen-Dagupan on February 16, 1963, encompassing the whole civil province of Pangasinan, and its seat was transferred from Lingayen to Dagupan.

== Gallery: Historical Photographs ==
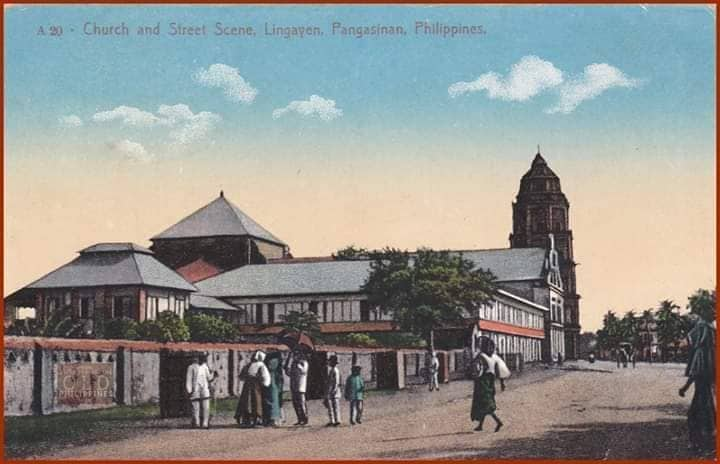
The church in a 1916 colored postcard

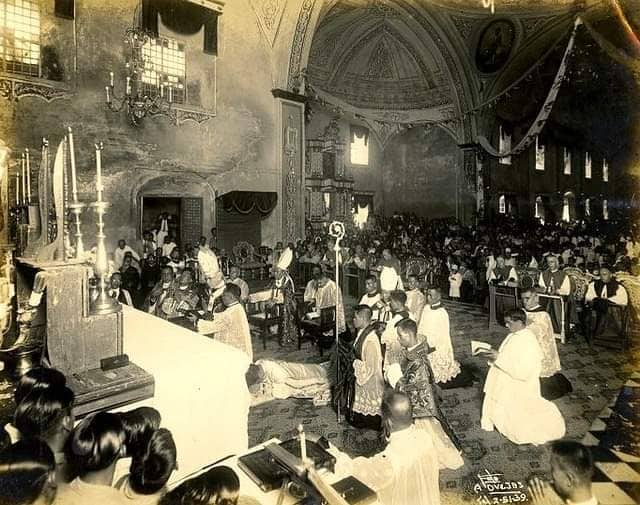
A Traditional Latin Mass officiated in 1939

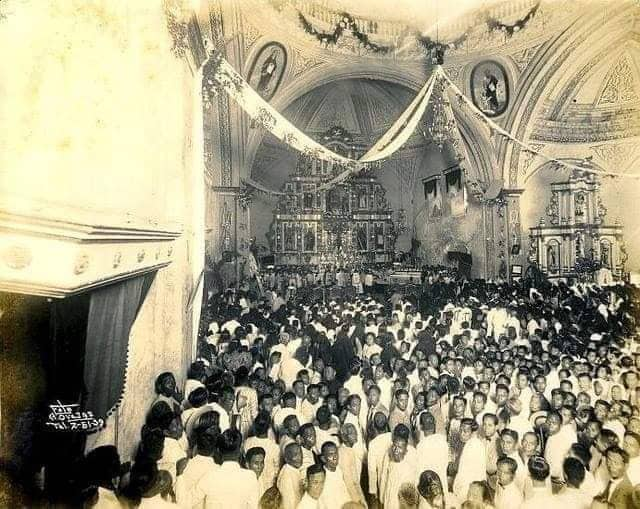
Circa 1939, before WWII bombing

== Gallery: Interior and Exterior Design ==
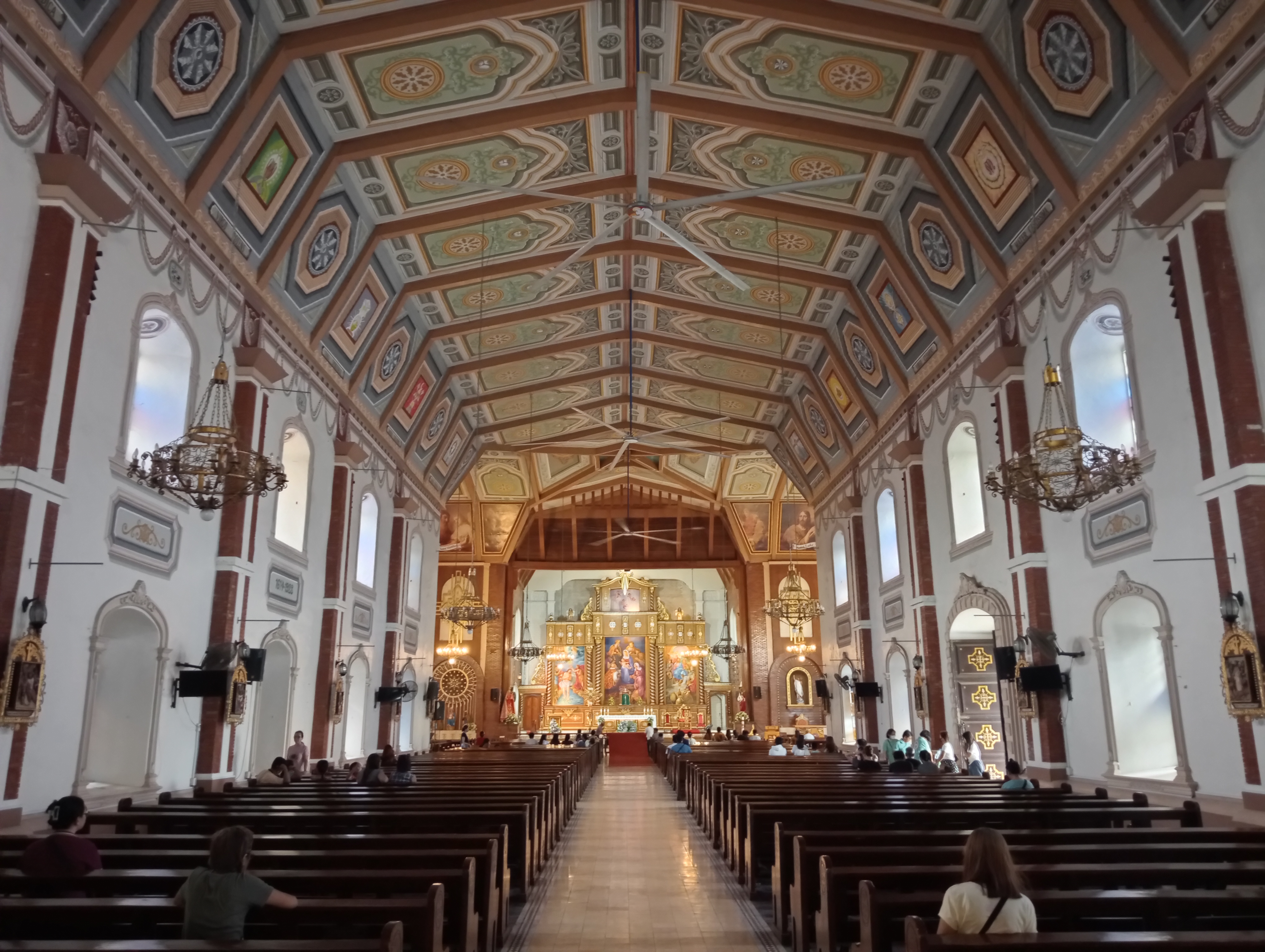
Church interior in 2024

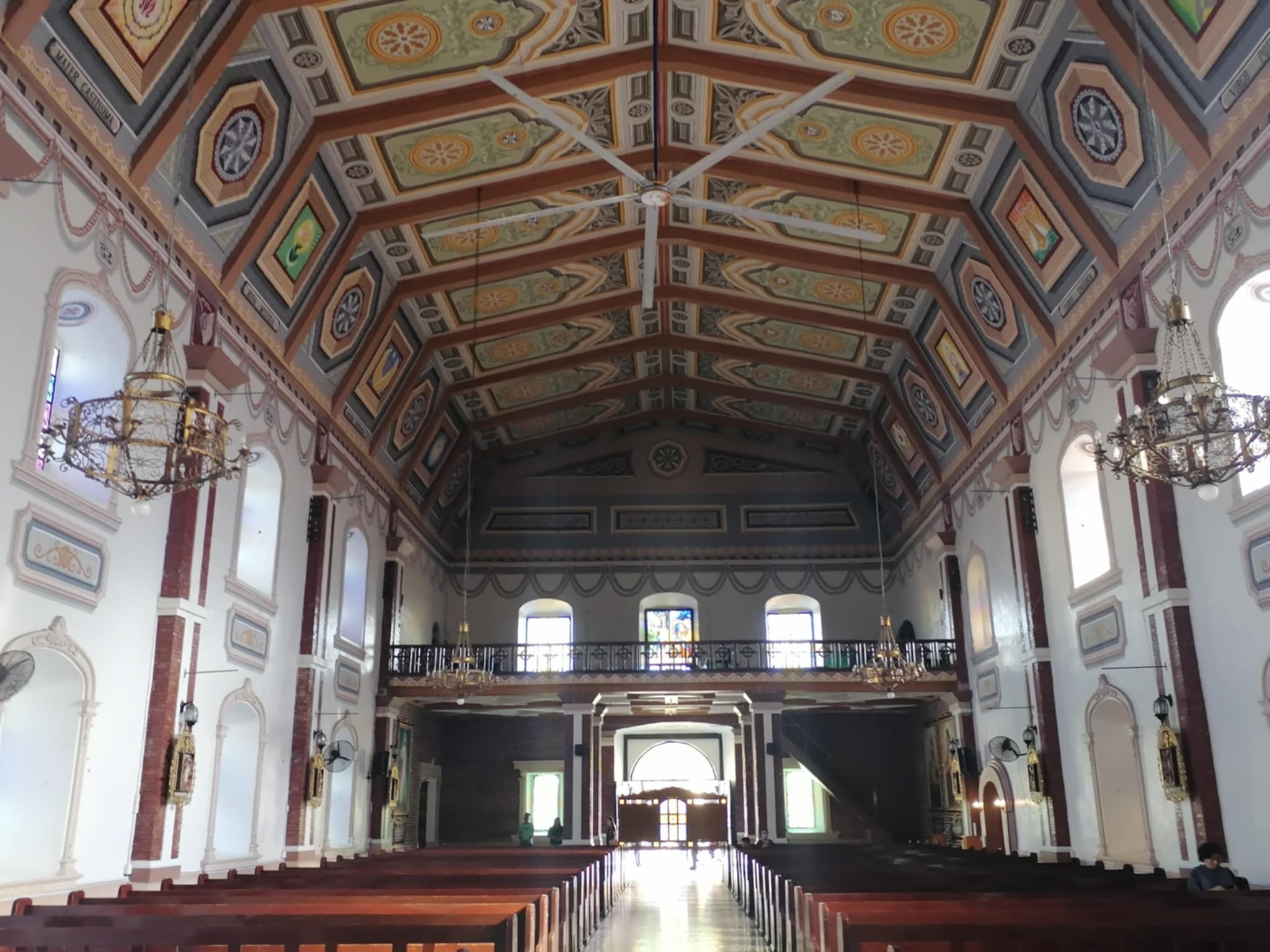
Nave and choir loft

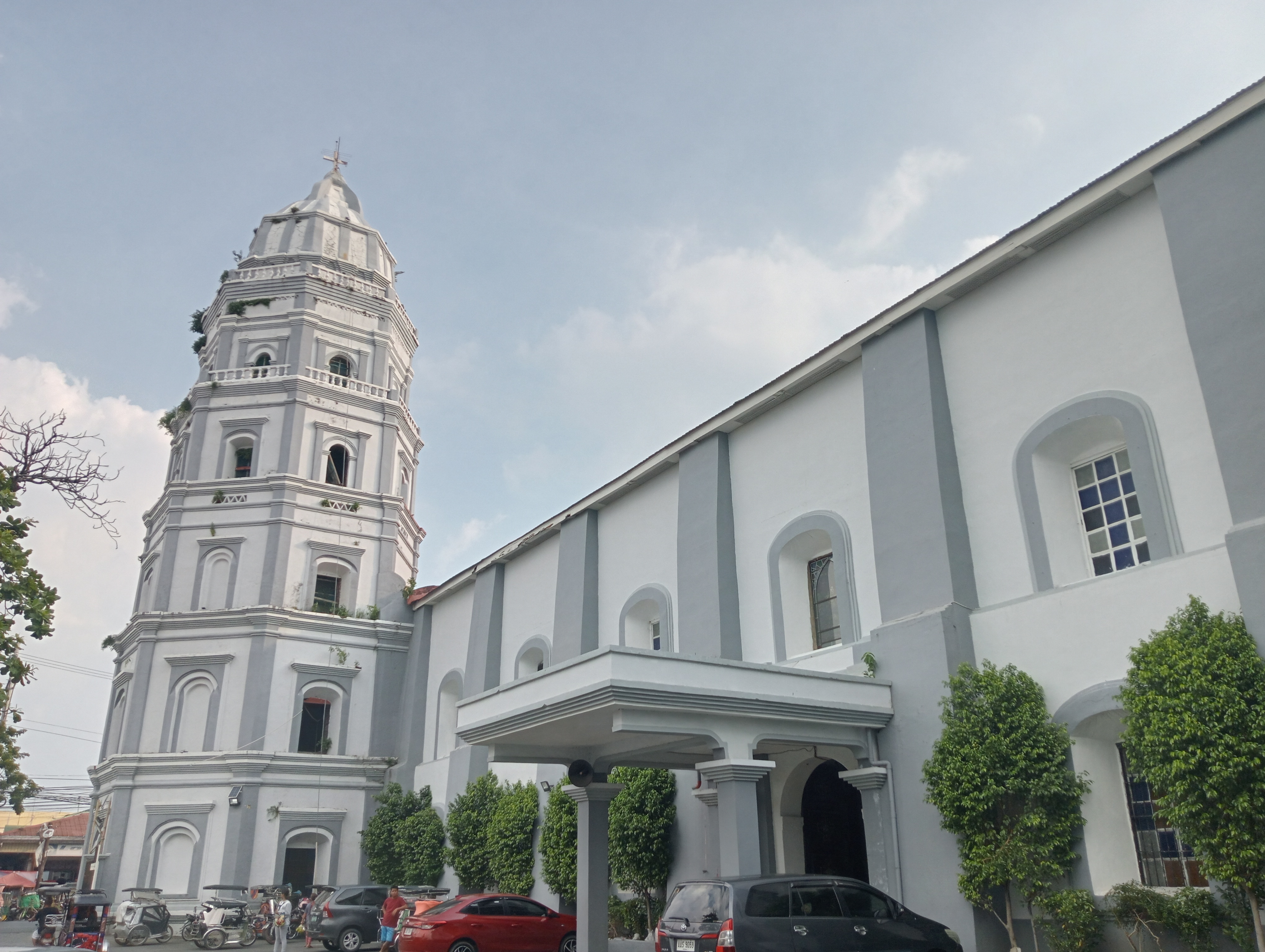
Belltower

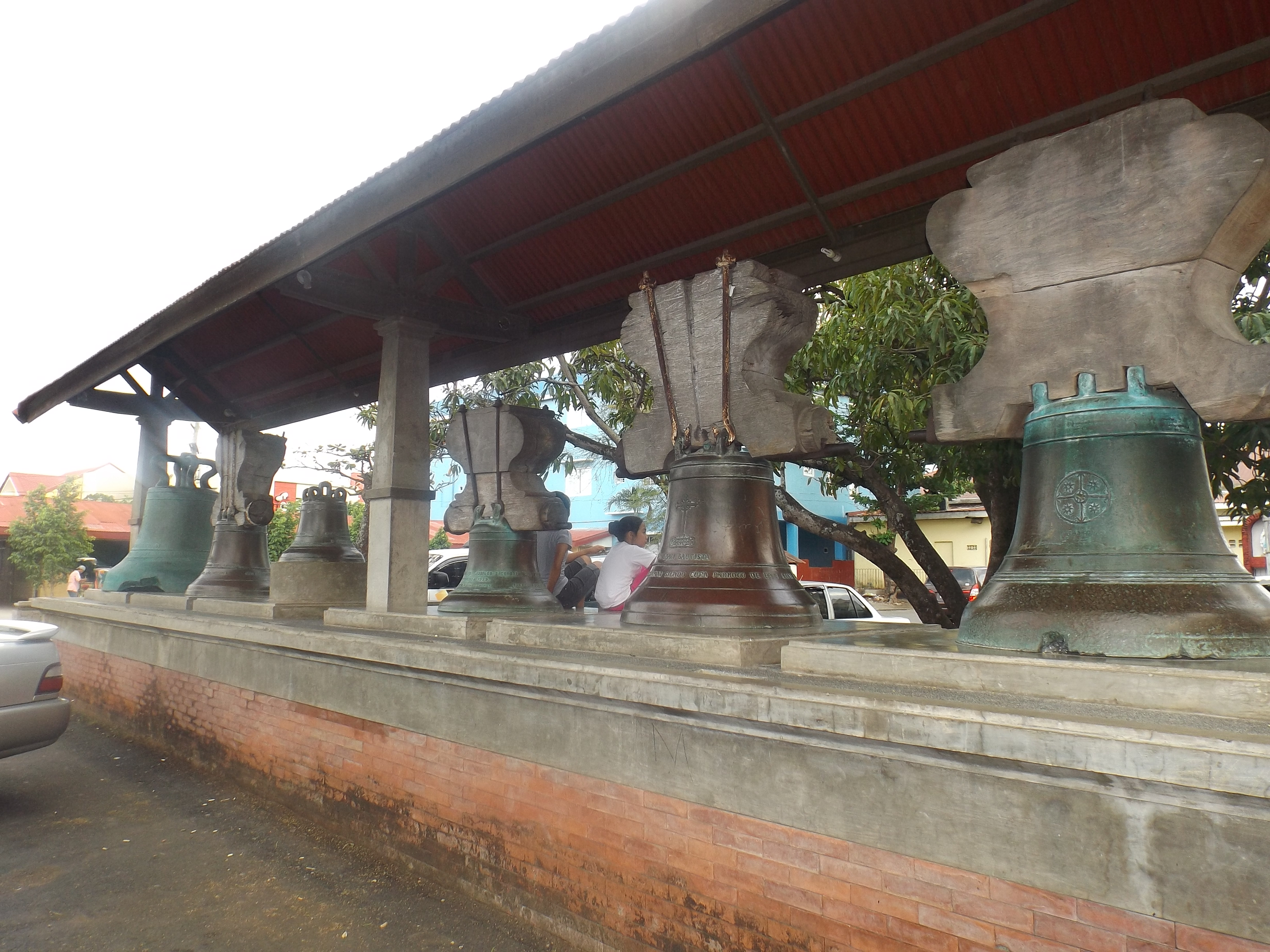
Old church bells

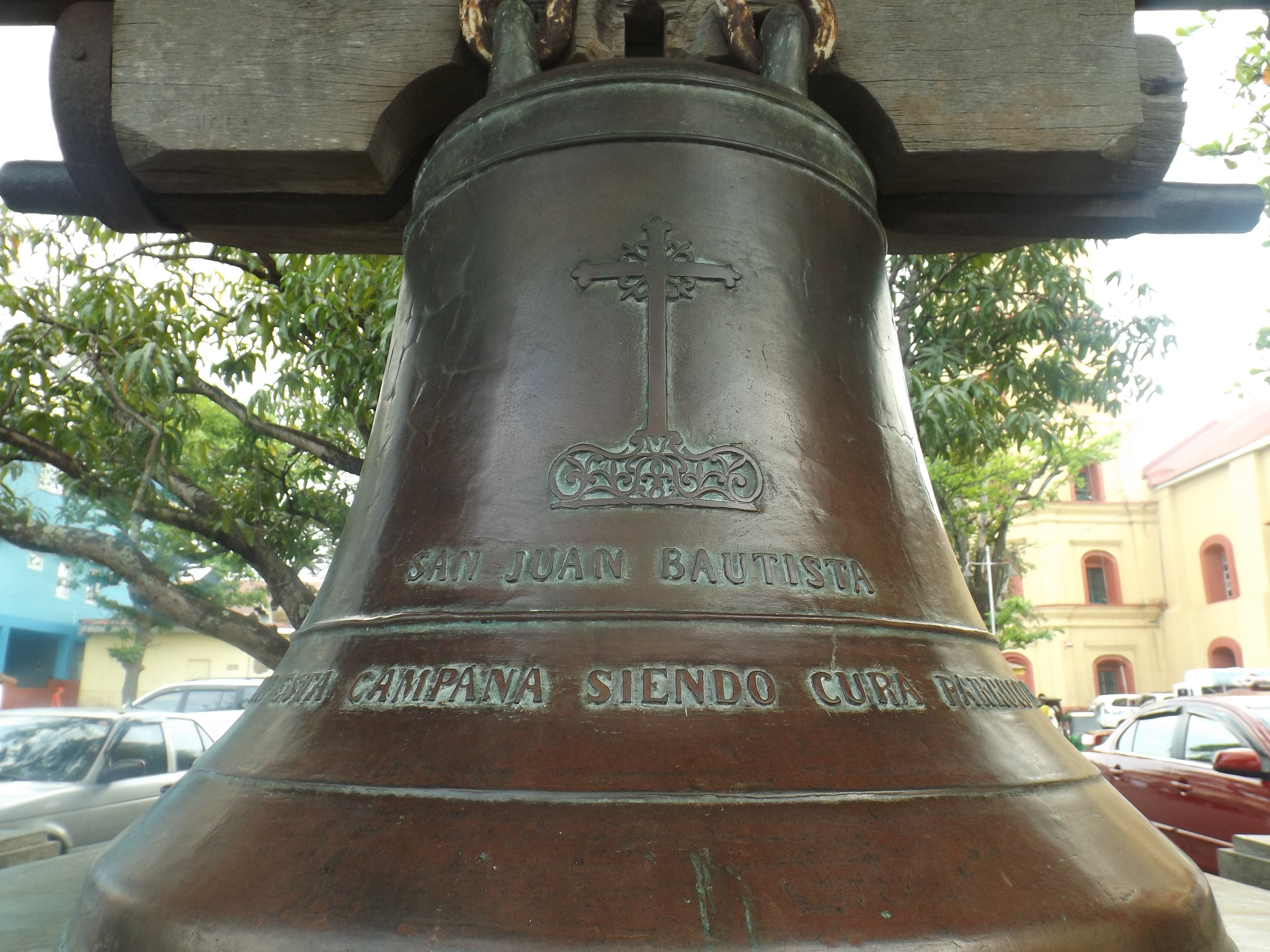
One of the oldest church bells

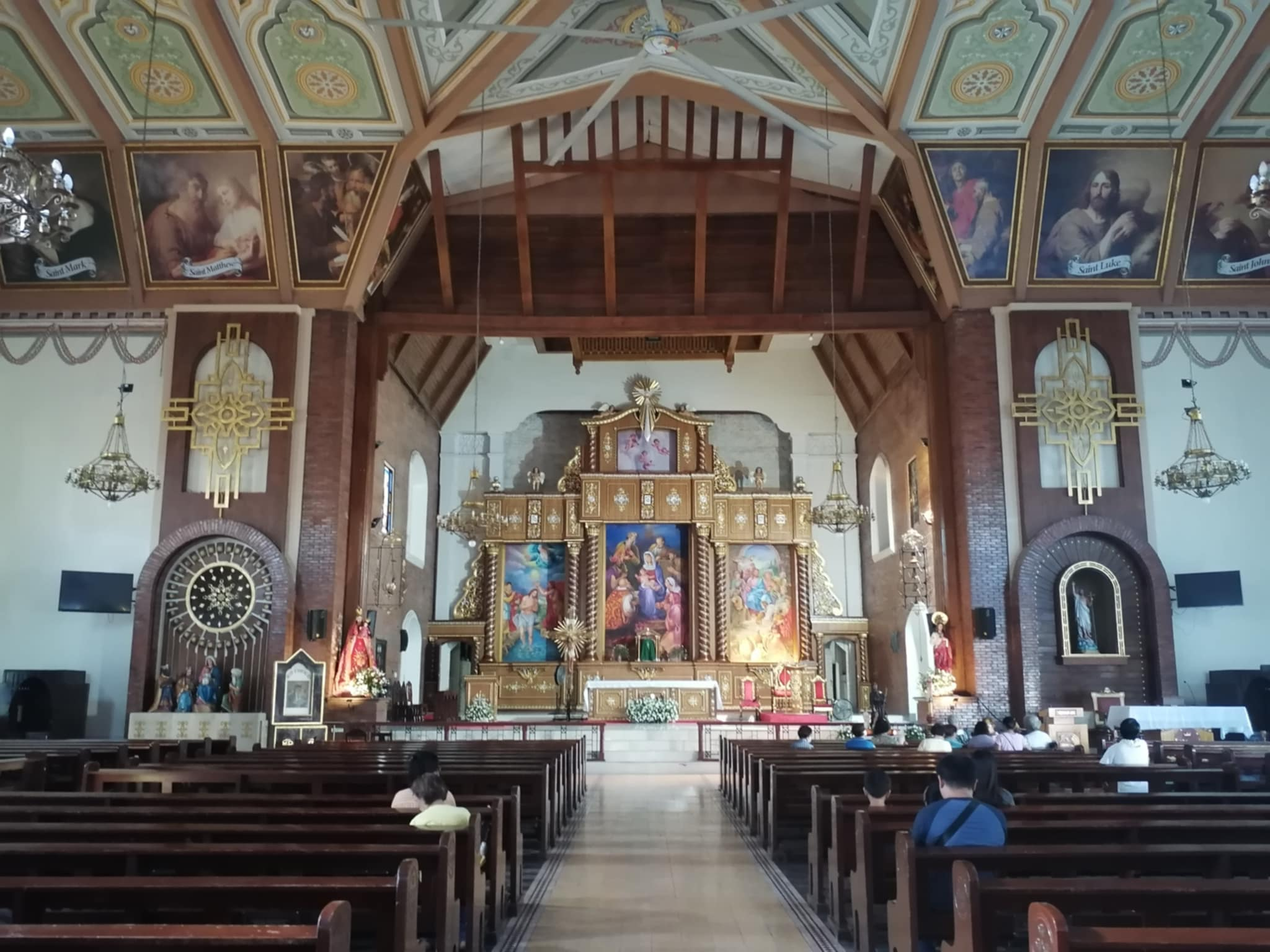
Main Altar and Retablo

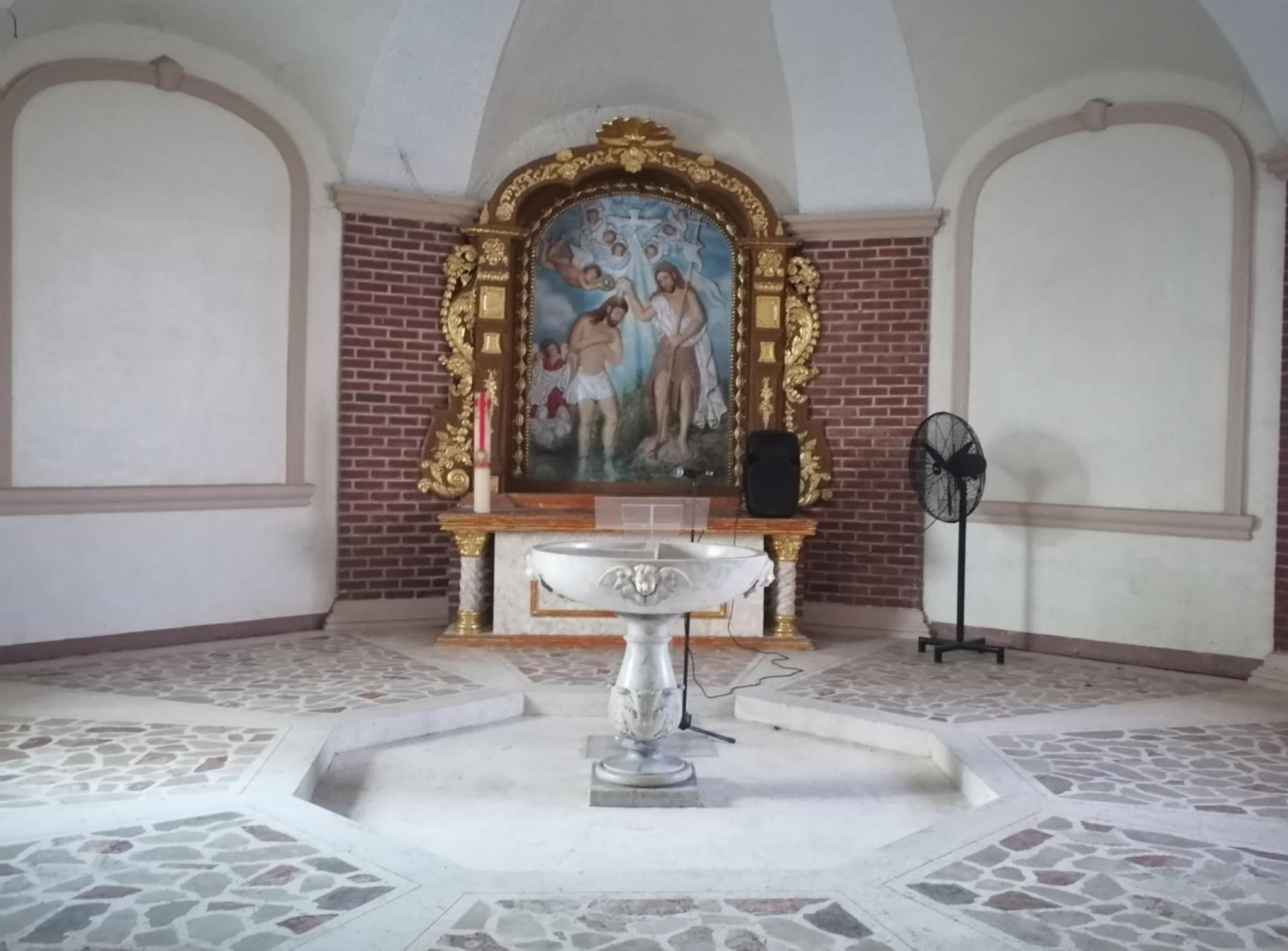
Church's Baptismal Font - the only remaining church piece that survived World War 2
