= Fidelis Layog =

Filipino Catholic bishop (born 1968

His Excellency, The Most Reverend Fidelis Bautista Layog T.O.Carm, D.D.
- Auxiliary Bishop of Lingayen-Dagupan; Titular Bishop of Girus Tarasii
- Province: Lingayen-Dagupan
- See: Lingayen-Dagupan
- Appointed: March 18, 2019

Orders
- Ordination: April 29, 1996
- Consecration: May 8, 2019 by Socrates B. Villegas

Personal details
- Born: November 20, 1968 (age 58) Dagupan City, Philippines
- Denomination: Roman Catholic
- Education: Immaculate Conception School of Theology, Angelicum
- Motto: Secundum Verbum Tuum (Latin for 'According to Your Word')

Ordination history
History
Episcopal consecration
- Principal consecrator: Socrates Villegas
- Co-consecrators: Renato Mayugba; Enrique Macaraeg

Styles of Fidelis B. Layog
- Reference style: His Excellency; The Most Reverend
- Spoken style: Your Excellency
- Religious style: Bishop

Fidelis Bautista Layog (born November 20, 1968) is a Filipino bishop of the Roman Catholic Church who serves as an Auxiliary Bishop of the Archdiocese of Lingayen-Dagupan. He was appointed to the episcopacy by Pope Francis on March 18, 2019.

== Early life and education ==
Fidelis Layog was born on November 20, 1968, in Dagupan City, in the Archdiocese of Lingayen-Dagupan. At the Mary Help of Christians College Seminary, he studied philosophy, before moving to Vigan, Ilocos Sur to study theology at the Immaculate Conception School of Theology.

== Priesthood ==
He was ordained a priest for the Archdiocese of Lingayen-Dagupan on April 29, 1996. He began his ministry as Prefect of Discipline at the Mary Help of Christians Seminary, serving from 1996 to 2000. After completing his studies in Rome in 2003, he was assigned to various pastoral and educational roles. From 2003 to 2009, he served as parish priest of the Holy Family Parish in Santa Barbara, Pangasinan. His brother, Anthony, also served as parish priest of the same church by 2006.

He later became parish priest of Saints Peter and Paul Parish in Calasiao, Pangasinan and vicar forane from 2011 to 2014, followed by an appointment as director of Mapandan Catholic School from 2014 to 2016. In 2017, he was named parish priest and moderator of the team ministry at Our Lady of Purification Parish in Binmaley, Pangasinan, while also serving as director of the Saint Columban Institute of Domalandan in Lingayen, Pangasinan.

== Episcopal ministry ==
On March 18, 2019, Pope Francis appointed Layog as Auxiliary Bishop of Lingayen-Dagupan and Titular Bishop of Girus Tarasii. He was consecrated on May 8, 2019, by Archbishop Socrates B. Villegas.

On January 14, 2020, Pope Francis appointed Bishop Layog as the Apostolic Administrator of the Diocese of Alaminos, following the transfer of Bishop Ricardo Baccay to Diocese of Tuguegarao. He served in that capacity until March 19, 2024, when Bishop Napoleon Sipalay was appointed as the new bishop of Alaminos.

Catholic Church titles
| Preceded by John Doaninoel | — TITULAR — Bishop of Girus Tarasii; May 8, 2019 – present | Incumbent |
