= Cesar Maria Guerrero =

Filipino bishop and Servant of God (1885–1961)

Servant of God César María Guerrero DD JCD
- Titular Bishop of Thuburbo Minus; Bishop Emeritus of San Fernando
- Church: Catholic Church
- Diocese: San Fernando
- Appointed: 14 May 1949
- Term ended: 14 March 1957
- Predecessor: Diocese erected
- Successor: Emilio Cinense
- Other posts: Bishop of Lingayen (1929-1937); Auxiliary Bishop of Manila (1937-1949)

Orders
- Ordination: 28 October 1914
- Consecration: 24 May 1929 by Michael James O’Doherty
- Rank: Bishop

Personal details
- Born: César María Guerrero y Rodríguez; 26 January 1885 Ermita, Manila, Captaincy General of the Philippines
- Died: 27 March 1961 (aged 76) Manila, Philippines
- Buried: Carmelite Monastery, Angeles, Philippines
- Denomination: Catholicism
- Parents: León María Guerrero; Aurora Rodríguez
- Education: Ateneo de Manila; University of Santo Tomas; Pontifical Latin American College; Pontifical Gregorian University
- Motto: Exultabunt ossa humiliata (The humbled bones will rejoice”); In auxilium meum respice (Look down to my help”)
- Coat of arms

César María Guerrero (26 January 1885 – 27 March 1961) was a Filipino prelate, and was the first bishop of two Philippine dioceses: Lingayen from 1929 to 1937, and San Fernando from 1949 until 1957. He has been declared Servant of God.

== Early life and education ==
Guerrero was born in Ermita, Manila, on 26 January 1885, to botanist León María Guerrero and Aurora Rodríguez.

He received his primary and secondary education and a Bachelor of Arts degree from Ateneo de Municipal. He later pursued degrees in Philosophy and Letters and in Civil Law at the University of Santo Tomas, completing his studies in 1905 and 1909, respectively.

== Priesthood ==
He studied Theology and Canon Law at the Pontifical Latin American College in Rome, Italy, and later earned a Doctorate in Theology in 1913 and a Doctorate in Canon Law in 1915 from the Pontifical Gregorian University.

He was ordained a priest on 28 October 1914. He celebrated his first Mass at the Basilica of Santa Maria Maggiore.

Upon his return to Manila in 1915, Guerrero was appointed assistant parish priest of Binondo Church, and at the same time, Vice-Secretary to the Archbishop of Manila, Michael James O'Doherty. In 1917, he was reassigned from Binondo to become chaplain of the Hospicio de San Jose.

He stayed for one year in the United States in 1922 to improve his English and served in a parish in Seattle, Washington.

Returning in 1922, he was named Doctoral Canon of the archdiocese and Director of the Colegio de Tiples of the Manila Cathedral. He served as Secretary to the Archbishop in 1927.

He was named a Domestic Prelate of His Holiness in 1926.

== Episcopacy ==
Styles of César María Guerrero
- Reference style: The Most Reverend
- Spoken style: Your Excellency
- Religious style: Bishop

The coat of arms of Cesar Maria Guerrero as Bishop of Lingayen.

After Pope Pius XI established the Diocese of Lingayen on 19 May 1928 through the Apostolic Constitution Continuam omnium from the territories of the Diocese of Nueva Segovia and was made a suffragan of the Archdiocese of Manila, Guerrero was appointed as the first bishop of Lingayen on 22 February 1929. He took possession of the Lingayen Cathedral on 23 May, and was consecrated bishop on 24 May 1929 by the Archbishop of Manila, Michael James O’Doherty, with Alfredo Verzosa y Florentin, Bishop of Lipa, and Santiago Caragnan Sancho, Bishop of Nueva Segovia, as co-consecrators.

He established the Mary Help of Christians Seminary in Binmaley, Pangasinan, in 1929. He served as Bishop of Lingayen until 16 December 1937.

Guerrero was appointed Auxiliary Bishop of Manila and concurrently Titular Bishop of Limisa on 16 December 1937. He was succeeded as Bishop of Lingayen by Mariano Madriaga the following year. Guerrero was later named Vicar General of the Archdiocese of Manila. During the Japanese occupation of the Philippines, he was compelled to represent the Catholic Church under threat that the entire Church would be declared an enemy; despite this, he was described as dignified and apostolic in his manner of communication. After the war, he faced allegations of collaboration with the Japanese and was brought before the People's Court on charges of treason; during this period, he retired to the Convent of San Francisco del Monte, and the case was dismissed in 1946.

On 14 May 1949, he was appointed the first Bishop of San Fernando, following the erection of the diocese by Pope Pius XII through the bull Probe noscitur on 11 December 1948, from territories taken from the Archdiocese of Manila.

He established the Mother of Good Counsel Minor Seminary in 1950 in Guagua, and later transferred to Apalit on 24 May 1952. He also convinced the Discalced Carmelites to establish a Carmelite foundation in Angeles, which he blessed in August 1956. He governed the diocese for nearly eight years.

During his tenure as bishop, Guerrero participated as co-consecrator in the episcopal consecrations of Luis Del Rosario in 1933, José Maria Cuenco in 1942, Alfredo Obviar in 1944, and Alejandro Olalia in 1949.

== Retirement and death ==
Guerrero retired on 14 March 1957 and was subsequently appointed Titular Bishop of Thuburbo Minus, as well as assistant to the papal throne with the rank of papal count. He was succeeded as Bishop of San Fernando by Emilio Cinense y Abera.

Two days before his death, he had his tombstone made with the inscription “Caro dabitur vermibus” (“the flesh will be given to the worms”).

He died of a heart attack on 27 March 1961 at the age of 76, after being found unconscious in his room by his brother, Alfredo Guerrero. His remains were laid in state at the Ermita Church and later in San Fernando, Pampanga, before he was buried at the Carmelite Monastery grounds in Angeles, alongside the remains of his mother. A Franciscan priest said about Guerrero: “Es sabio y santo!” (He is wise and saintly!)

== Cause of beatification ==
On 21 February 2026, the Archdiocese of Lingayen-Dagupan announced that the Holy See, through the Dicastery for the Causes of Saints, had approved the opening of Guerrero's cause for beatification through a letter dated 26 January 2026, granting him the title Servant of God. The archdiocese opened the cause for beatification on 27 March 2026, the 65th anniversary of the death of Guerrero.
