= Alaminos Cathedral =

Roman Catholic church in Pangasinan, Philippines

- Saint Joseph the Patriarch Cathedral Parish
- Parokyang Katedral ni San Jose ang Patriyarka (Filipino); Parroquia Catedral de San José el Patriarca (Spanish); Katedral ng Alaminos (Filipino)
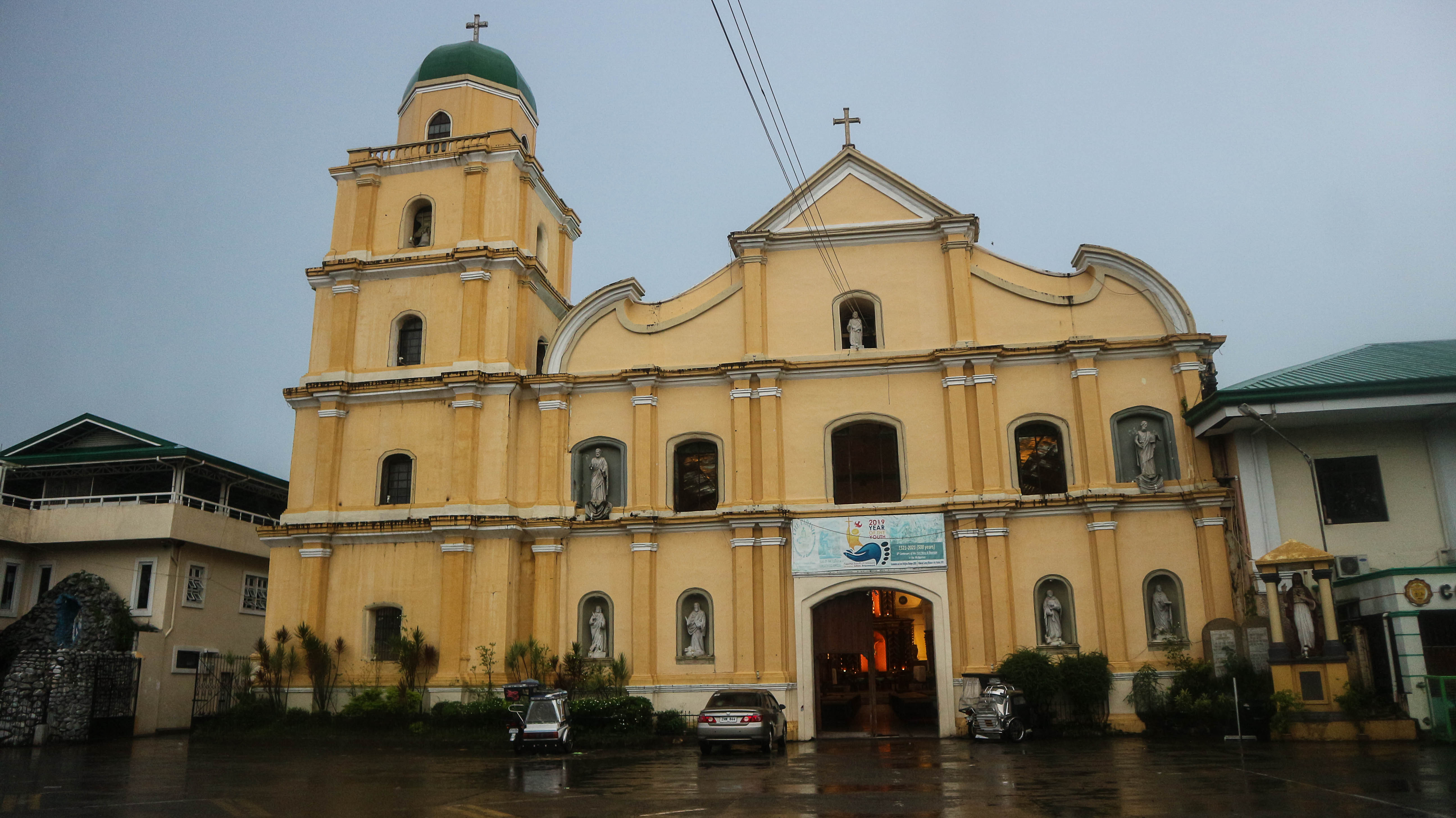
- Cathedral facade in 2019

- Location in Luzon Location in the Philippines
- 16°09′20″N 119°58′43″E
- Location: Alaminos, Pangasinan
- Country: Philippines
- Denomination: Roman Catholic

History
- Status: Cathedral
- Founded: 1776
- Dedication: Saint Joseph
- Consecrated: 1857, 1985

Architecture
- Functional status: Active
- Architectural type: Church building
- Style: Baroque
- Completed: 1857

Administration
- Province: Lingayen-Dagupan
- Diocese: Alaminos

Clergy
- Bishop: Napoleon Sipalay

Saint Joseph the Patriarch Cathedral Parish, commonly known as Alaminos Cathedral, is a Roman Catholic cathedral located at Barangay Poblacion in the city of Alaminos, Pangasinan, Philippines. Dedicated to Saint Joseph the Patriarch, it has been the episcopal seat of the Diocese of Alaminos since 1985.

== History ==
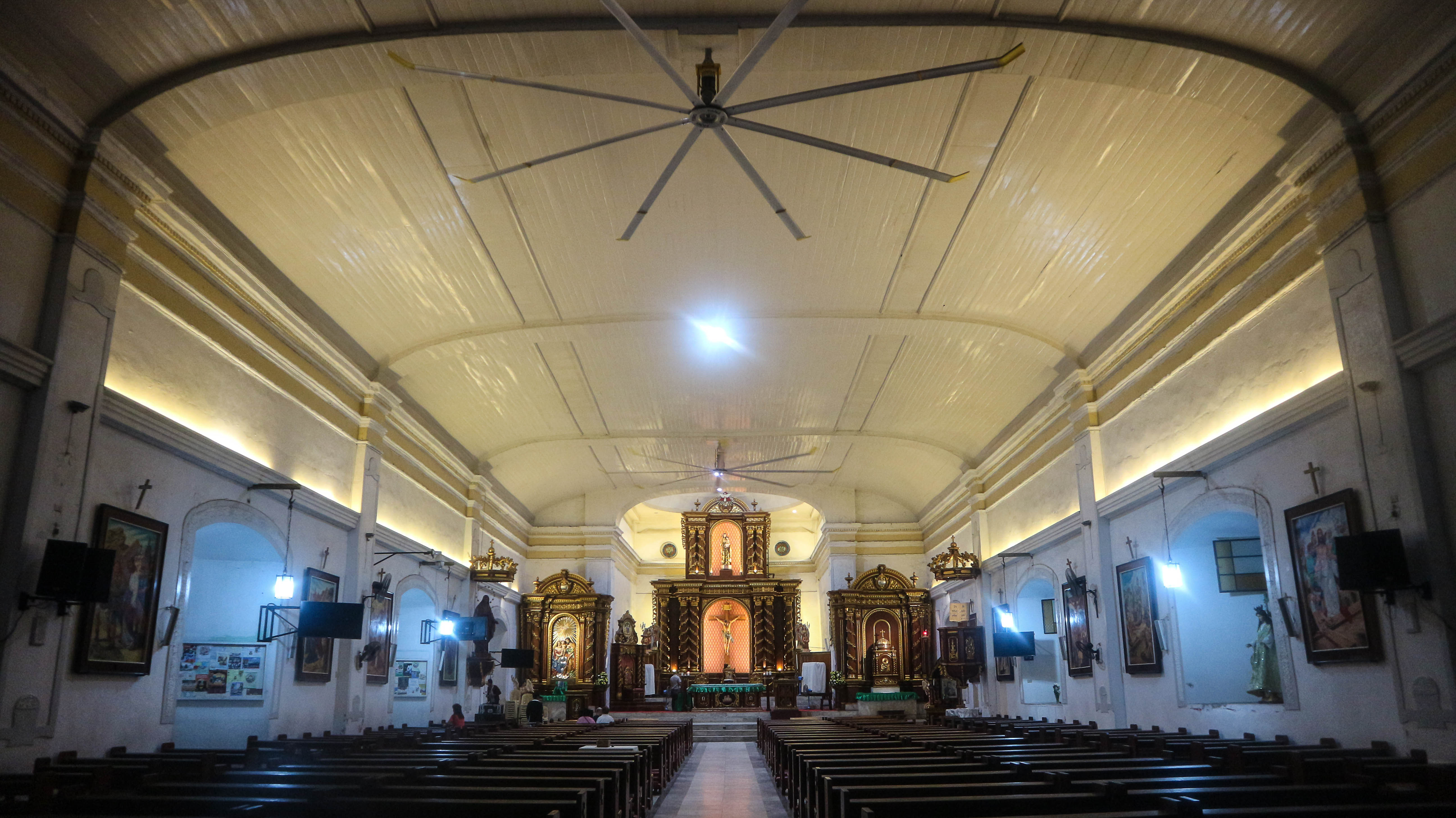
Church interior in 2019

In 1743, the Zambal pioneers settled in what is now the seaside barangay Baleyadaan of Alaminos, with the settlement named after their leader Suyang. There, they built houses and a chapel dedicated to Saint Joseph. Due to the frequent typhoons, they resettled to the wide plains southwest of their previous area and named it Casboran, in reference to the plants abundant in their new settlement. A continued increase in population led into the creation of a new local government with its church and convent being constructed in 1768. A disagreement in town leadership led to the burning of the whole town including the church, with its residents fleeing in all directions. Survivors of the fire resettled some 5 kilometres (3 miles) from the sea and was called Salapsap or Zarapzap.

The Augustinian Recollects, who are in charge of the area, then formally established a parish, with Toribio Raymundo as the first parish priest who would go on to serve from 1778 until 1815. In 1834, the church was charred again. It was then reconstructed under the helm of Manuel Busqueto from 1837 to 1849. The architect-engineer Maestro Cenon, who also designed the church of Aguilar, was tapped by Busqueto to design the church of Sarapsap. The entire town was told to contribute in rebuilding the church. Busqueto died after 16 years of being Sarapsap's parish priest.

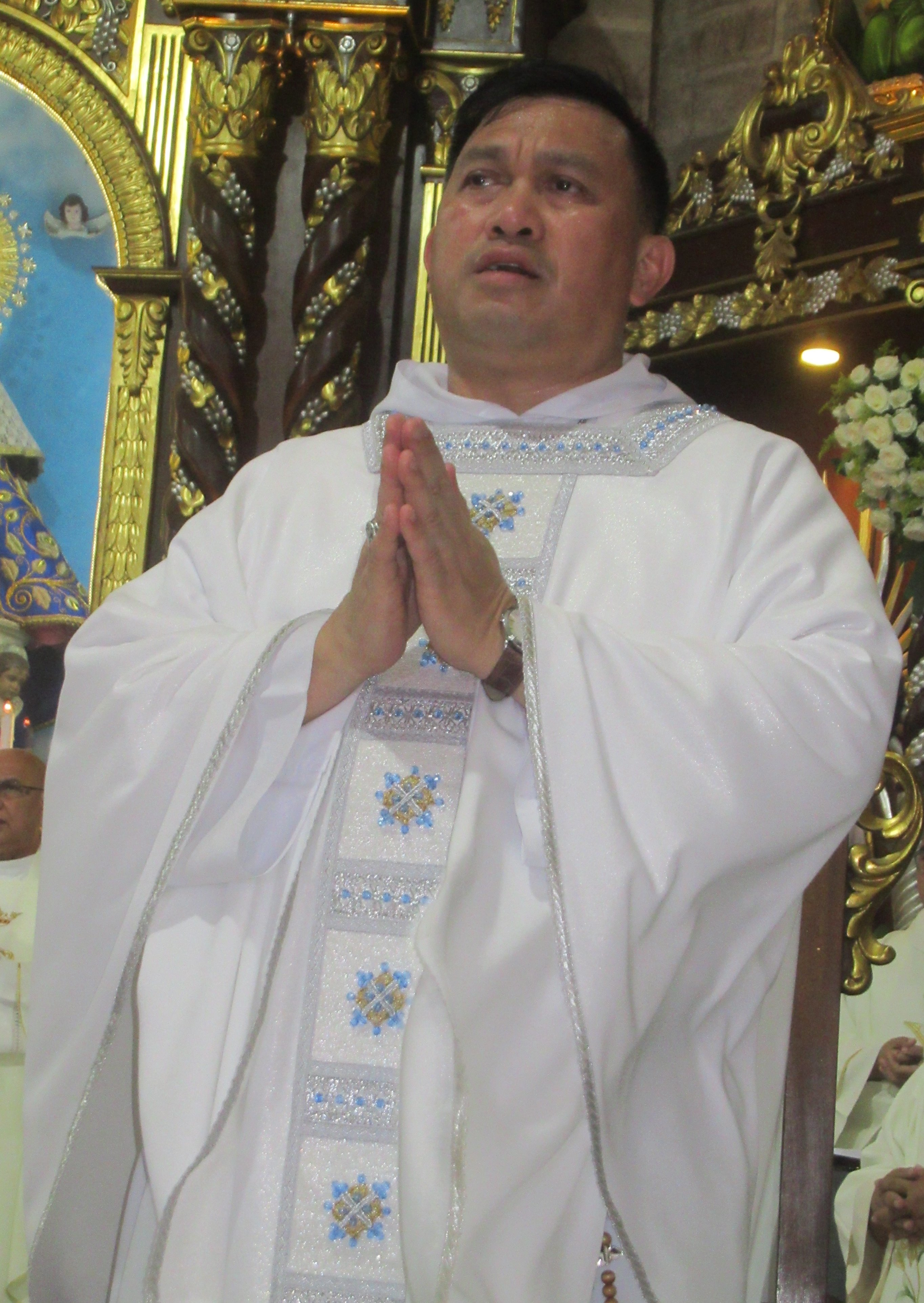
Bishop Napoleon Sipalay (Makinabang Church)

From 1849 to 1878, Jose Tornos continued the rebuilding of the new church. In 1857, the church was inaugurated built with stone walls, nipa roofing, a tabernacle and a niche for the church's patron, Saint Joseph. In 1860, Juan Alaminos y Vivar visited the town and in 1873, the town's name was changed into Alaminos in honor of the governor-general of the Philippines.

Victoriano Vereciano became Alaminos' parish priest in 1879. In 14 years, he made improvements in the Alaminos' church and convent which include: obtaining hardwood agaro from the forests of Zaragoza and tindalo from Alos; galvanized iron sheets replaced the church's nipa roof; installation of wood parquet for the loft's floor; the ceiling was repainted; and communion rails made of iron were placed. A silver altar, a sanctuary light, floors made of concrete, and church bells were also added or implemented.

Andres Romero succeeded Vereciano who died in 1893. Under his term, the cemetery was enlarged and the chapel was reconstructed. During the Philippine-American War in 1901, the Augustinian Recollects ceded the parish's administration to the local clergy.

Among the improvements made to the church of Alaminos from 1926 include: the Sacred Heart of Jesus statue installation in 1930; construction of grotto of Our Lady of Lourdes with its image sculpted by the late Filipino artist and clergyman, Lingayen-Dagupan Archbishop Mariano Madriaga; adding of new church pews; the church belfry was remade into concrete; fences were added for the church's front yard; new tabernacle installation; Our Lady of Mount Carmel chapel and mortuary construction; and the installation of large Stations of the Cross, done by a local artist.

The church of Alaminos was elevated into a cathedral when the Diocese of Alaminos was founded in 1985. Bishop Jesus Cabrera, its first bishop, spearheaded more cathedral improvements which include: installation of marble on the cathedral's altar and floor; new sacristy; constructions of Alaminos Pastoral Center and perpetual adoration chapel; and the repainting of the whole church in 1995.
