= John Doaninoel =

Papua New Guinean Roman Catholic prelate and Marist priest

John Doaninoel (March 1, 1950 – August 7, 2018) was a Papua New Guinean Roman Catholic prelate and Marist priest. He was appointed auxiliary bishop of the Roman Catholic Archdiocese of Rabaul in Papua New Guinea by Pope Benedict XVI on December 6, 2007. He served in Rabaul from 2008 until 2011. On June 9, 2011, Doaninoel was appointed auxiliary bishop of the Roman Catholic Archdiocese of Honiara in the Solomon Islands, a position he held from 2011 until his death on August 7, 2018.

Doaninoel was born in Timputz, Bougainville Island in the present-day Autonomous Region of Bougainville in Papua New Guinea. He was ordained a Catholic priest within the Oceania Marist province in 1980.

Catholic Church titles
Preceded by Franz-Peter Tebartz-van Elst	Titular Bishop of Girus Tarasii; 2007–2018	Succeeded by Fidelis Layog
