= Antonino Pinci =

Italian prelate

Antonino Pinci (17 February 1912 – 16 August 1987) was an Italian prelate of the Catholic Church who worked in the diplomatic service of the Holy See. He was Apostolic Nuncio to Panama from 1961 to 1971.

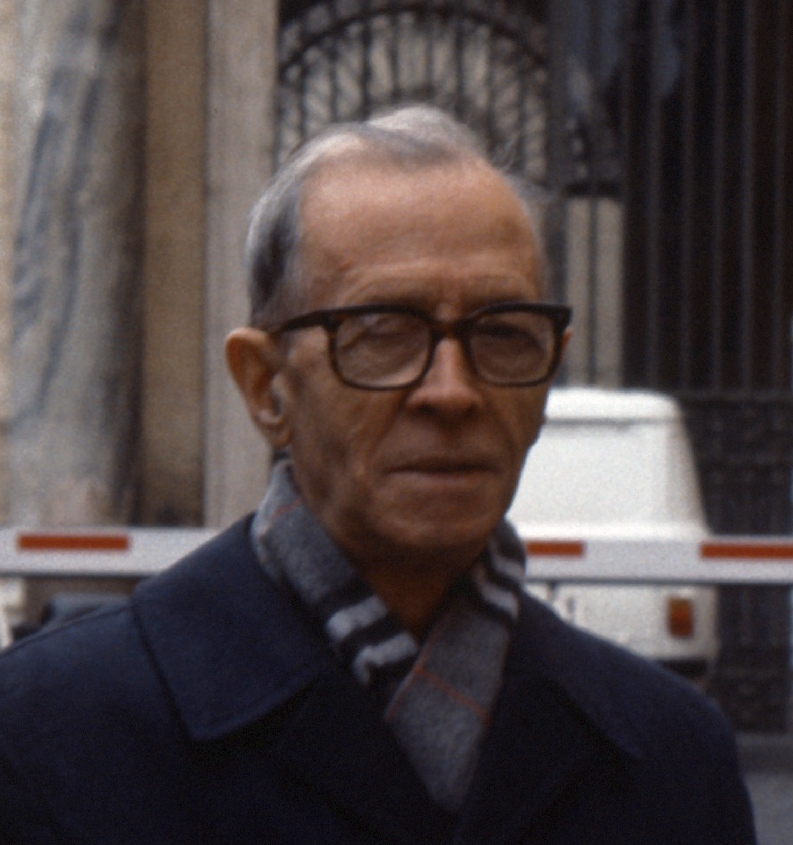
Archbishop Antonino Pinci

== Biography ==
Antonino Pinci was born on 17 February 1912 in Cave, southeast of Rome. He was ordained a priest on 29 June 1936.

To prepare for a diplomatic career he entered the Pontifical Ecclesiastical Academy in 1938. His early assignments in the diplomatic service included stints in Peru, Uruguay, Costa Rica, and Switzerland (1943–47).

On 31 October 1961, Pope John XXIII appointed him titular archbishop of Tarasa in Numidia and Apostolic Nuncio to Panama.

He received his episcopal consecration on 17 December 1961 from Cardinal Amleto Cicognani.

He resigned in 1971 at age 58 and was succeeded by Edoardo Rovida on 31 July 1971.

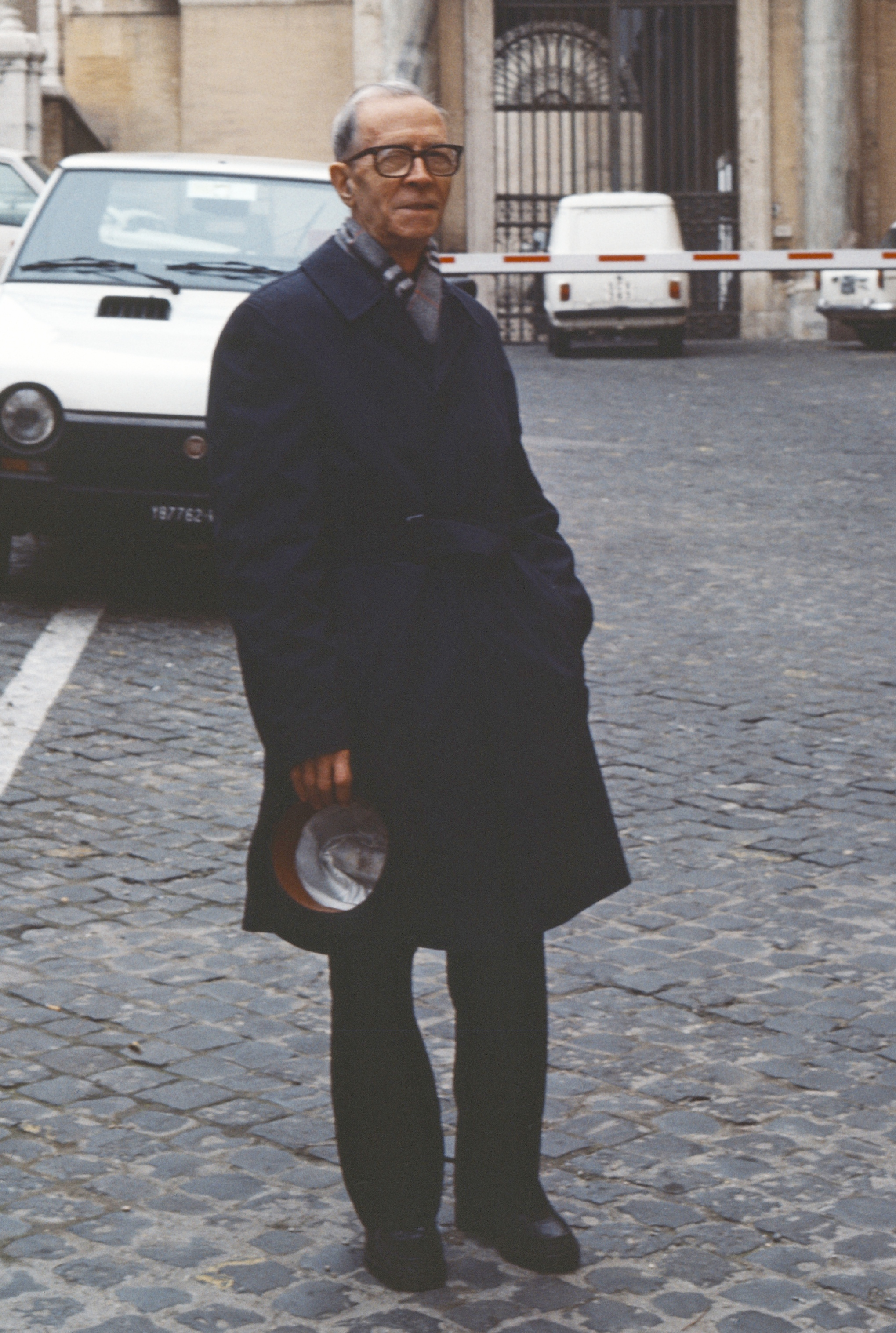
Archbishop Antonino Pinci

In his later years he lived in Cave in a Liberty-style villa purchased by his family in 1952, now marked with a mosaic of his coat of arms bearing his motto Caritas Plusquam Potestas.

Pinci died on 16 August 1987 at the age of 75.
