= Archdiocese of Lingayen–Dagupan =

Latin Catholic archdiocese in the Philippines

Archdiocese of Lingayen–Dagupan Archidioecesis Lingayensis-Dagupanensis Arkidiosis na Lingayen–Dagupan Arkidiocesis ti Lingayen–Dagupan Arkidiyosesis ng Lingayen–Dagupan Arquidiócesis de Lingayén–Dagúpan

Catholic
- Dagupan Cathedral

- Coat of arms

Location
- Country: Philippines
- Territory: Central Pangasinan (Basista, Bautista, Bayambang, Binmaley, Calasiao, Dagupan, Laoac, Lingayen, Malasiqui, Manaoag, Mangaldan, Mapandan, San Carlos, San Fabian, San Jacinto, Santa Barbara, Urbiztondo)
- Ecclesiastical province: Lingayen–Dagupan
- Metropolitan: Lingayen–Dagupan
- Coordinates: 16°02′32″N 120°20′04″E

Statistics
- Area: 1,565 km^{2} (604 sq mi)
- Population: Total; Catholics: (as of 2021); 1,494,300; 1,209,250 (80.9%)
- Parishes: 52

Information
- Denomination: Catholic
- Sui iuris church: Latin Church
- Rite: Roman Rite
- Established: May 19, 1928
- Cathedral: Metropolitan Cathedral of St. John the Evangelist
- Co-cathedral: Co-Cathedral and Parish of the Epiphany of Our Lord
- Patron saint: St. John the Evangelist
- Secular priests: 76 m

Current leadership
- Pope: Leo XIV
- Metropolitan Archbishop: Socrates Buenaventura Villegas
- Suffragans: Napoleon Sipalay (Alaminos); Prudencio Andaya Jr. (Cabanatuan); Daniel Oca Presto (San Fernando de La Union); Samuel Agcaracar, S.V.D. (San Jose); Nick Vaquilar (Urdaneta)
- Auxiliary Bishops: Fidelis Bautista Layog

Map
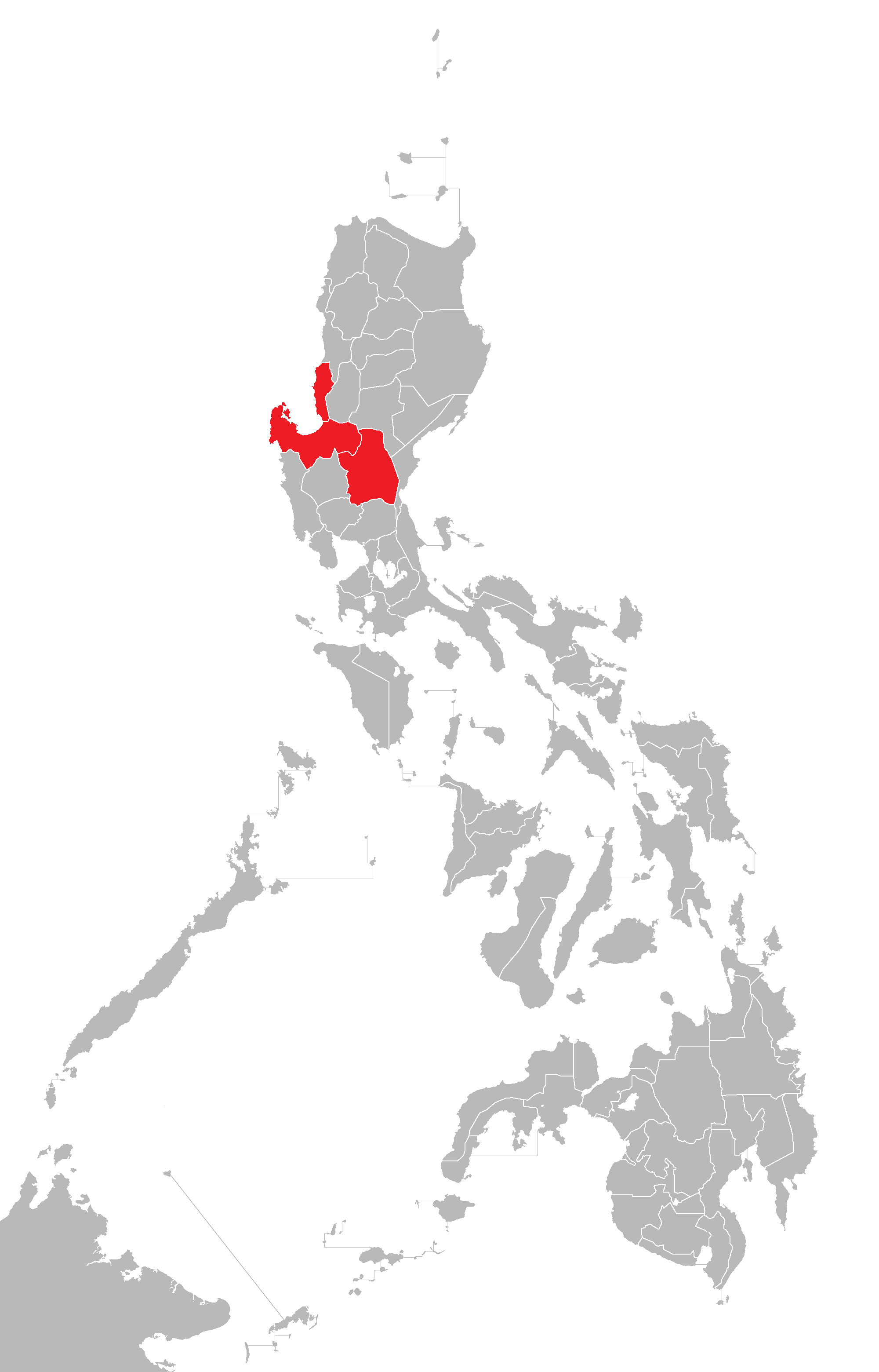
- Jurisdiction of the metropolitan see within the Philippines.

Website
- Archdiocese of Lingayen–Dagupan

The Roman Catholic Archdiocese of Lingayen–Dagupan is a Latin Catholic archdiocese of the Catholic Church in the Province of Pangasinan, Philippines. Its cathedral is the Metropolitan Cathedral of St. John the Evangelist in Dagupan with a co-cathedral, the Epiphany of Our Lord Parish Church, in the neighboring municipality of Lingayen.

== History ==
The Diocese of Lingayen was created on May 19, 1928, comprising the entire province of Pangasinan. In 1954, because of the destruction brought on Lingayen by World War II, the see was transferred to Dagupan, thus renaming the diocese as the Diocese of Lingayen–Dagupan. The diocese was elevated to an archdiocese in 1963. In 1985, two new dioceses were carved out from the archdiocese: Alaminos and Urdaneta.

== Coat of arms ==
The nimbed silver eagle is the symbol of Saint John the Apostle and Evangelist, the titular of the cathedral at Dagupan. The silver star (previously depicted as three gold Oriental crowns) refers to the Epiphany of the Lord, the titular of the co-cathedral at Lingayen. The red wavy pile represents Lingayen Gulf. The green field represents the "rice-bowl" of the Philippines, the whole of Pangasinan and Nueva Ecija. The three heraldic roses represent our Lady, the Mystical Rose, who is venerated in the archdiocese under three titles: Our Lady of the Most Holy Rosary of Manaoag; Our Lady of Purification; and Mary Help of Christians.

== Timeline of bishops ==
=== Ordinaries ===
Coat of arms of the Diocese of Lingayen (1938–1954) designed by then-bishop Mariano Madriaga.

Coat of arms of the Archdiocese of Lingayen–Dagupan first used in 1954 and designed by Archbishop Mariano Madriaga. This variant used three Oriental crowns representing the Three Wise Men.

== Ordinaries ==
=== Bishops and archbishops ===
Bishop		Period in office	Notes	Coat of arms
Bishops of Lingayen (May 19, 1928 – February 11, 1954)
1	Servant of God; Cesar Maria Guerrero	May 24, 1929 – December 16, 1937 (8 years, 206 days)	Appointed Auxiliary Bishop of Manila	
2	Mariano Aspiras Madriaga	May 24, 1938 – February 11, 1954 (15 years, 263 days)		
Bishops of Lingayen–Dagupan (February 11, 1954 – February 16, 1963)
2	Mariano Aspiras Madriaga	February 11, 1954 – February 16, 1963 (9 years, 5 days)	Promoted to metropolitan archbishop status	
Metropolitan Archbishops of Lingayen–Dagupan (February 16, 1963 – present)
1	Mariano Aspiras Madriaga	February 16, 1963 – February 7, 1973 (9 years, 357 days)	Resigned	
2	Federico Guba Limon, S.V.D.	February 7, 1973 – August 24, 1991 (18 years, 198 days)	Retired	
3	Oscar Valero Cruz	August 24, 1991 – November 4, 2009 (18 years, 72 days)	Retired	
4	Socrates Buenventura "Soc" Villegas, O.P.	November 4, 2009 – present (17 years, 15 days)		

=== Coadjutor archbishop ===
Bishop		Period in office	Notes	Coat of arms
1	Federico Guba Limon, S.V.D.	January 7, 1972 – February 7, 1973 (1 year, 31 days)	Succeeded Archbishop Madriaga in 1973	

=== List of auxiliary bishops ===
Bishop		Period in office	Titular see	Notes	Coat of arms
1	Francisco Raval Cruces	July 24, 1968 – March 4, 1970 (1 year, 223 days)	Tambeae	Appointed Bishop of Ilagan	
2	Jesus Aputen Cabrera	July 1, 1980 – April 22, 1985 (4 years, 295 days)	Thisiduo	Appointed Bishop of Alaminos	
3	Renato Pine Mayugba	December 27, 2005 – October 12, 2012 (6 years, 290 days)	Centuriones	Appointed Bishop of Laoag	
4	Jose Elmer Imas Mangalinao	August 22, 2016 – May 24, 2018 (1 year, 275 days)	Urusi	Appointed Bishop of Bayombong	
5	Fidelis Bautista Layog	May 8, 2019 – present (7 years, 195 days)	Girus Tarasii		

=== Affiliated Bishops ===
- Jesus Juan Acosta Sison, appointed Bishop of Tarlac in 1963.
- Enrique de Vera Macaraeg, appointed Bishop of Tarlac in 2016.
- Rafael T. Cruz, appointed Bishop of Baguio in 2024.

== Suffragan dioceses and bishops ==
Diocese	Bishop	Period in office	Coat of arms
Alaminos (Pangasinan)	Napoleon B. Sipalay Jr.	March 19, 2024 – present (2 years, 245 days)	
Cabanatuan (Nueva Ecija)	Prudencio P. Andaya Jr.	February 3, 2025 – present (1 year, 289 days)	
San Fernando de La Union (La Union)	Daniel O. Presto	August 2, 2018 – present (8 years, 109 days)	
San Jose de Nueva Ecija (Nueva Ecija)	Samuel N. Agcaracar, S.V.D.	February 6, 2026 – present (286 days)	
Urdaneta (Pangasinan)	Nick A. Vaquilar	July 28, 2026 – present (114 days)	

== See also ==
- Catholic Church in the Philippines
- List of Catholic dioceses in the Philippines
