= Mariano Madriaga =

Filipino prelate (1902–1981)

The Most Reverend Mariano Madriaga DD JCD
- Archbishop of Lingayen-Dagupan
- Province: Lingayen-Dagupan
- See: Lingayen-Dagupan
- Appointed: February 16, 1963
- Term ended: February 7, 1973
- Predecessor: Cesar Maria Guerrero y Rodriguez
- Successor: Federico Guba Limon
- Previous post: Bishop of Lingayen (1938–1963)

Orders
- Ordination: March 15, 1930 by Santiago Caragnan Sancho
- Consecration: May 24, 1938 by Gabriel Martelino Reyes

Personal details
- Born: Mariano Aspiras Madriaga; May 5, 1902 Agoo, La Union, Philippine Islands
- Died: November 1, 1981 (aged 79)
- Denomination: Catholic Church
- Motto: Misericordias Altissimi memorabo (Latin for 'I will remember the mercies of the Most High'
- Coat of arms: Mariano Madriaga's coat of arms

Mariano Aspiras Madriaga (May 5, 1902 – November 1, 1981) was a Filipino prelate of the Catholic Church. He served as bishop (and later archbishop) of Lingayen-Dagupan from 1938 to 1973.

He was the official heraldist of the Catholic Church in the Philippines and was responsible for designing the coats of arms of dioceses and prelates from the 1950s until the 1970s.

== Early life and education ==
Styles of Mariano Madriaga
- Reference style: The Most Reverend
- Spoken style: Your Excellency
- Religious style: Archbishop

Mariano Aspiras Madriaga was born on May 5, 1902, in Agoo, La Union, and was baptized at his town parish on May 10. He enrolled in public schools for his elementary education in 1911 and graduated in 1918 with the greatest overall average in the province of La Union. He was also awarded the Lucero Prize for possessing the greatest written exam average among 7th grade graduates in La Union. He then enrolled at the University of the Philippines Integrated School for his high school and graduated in 1923, where he won the Dean Benitez Prize for winning the spelling contest in 1918 and the Menias Prize in "Current Events" for his speech on "The League of Nations."

He later accompanied Bishop Peter Joseph Hurth of Nueva Segovia in his travels to Hong Kong for health reasons, and the bishop tutored him in Latin. He attended his first-year Philosophy at the Conciliar Seminary of Vigan (now the Immaculate Conception Minor Seminary) under the Jesuits from 1924 to 1925, and at the end of the school year, he received a gold medal from the renowned Jesuit Provincial, Fr. Joaquin Villalonga, SJ, for his high grades. He then attended San Carlos Seminary in Mandaluyong as a second-year Philosophy student from 1925 to 1926 under the Spanish Vincentians, and later completed his Theology studies under the SVD Fathers in Vigan from 1926 to 1929.

== Priesthood ==
His chances of being ordained were slim because of a severe case of typhoid fever that he contracted in March 1929. But by the "mercies of the Most High," he recovered, and on March 15, 1930, the then-bishop Santiago Sancho of Nueva Segovia ordained him to the priesthood. He worked in the diocesan Curia and was a parish priest in several parishes within the diocese. Less than a year after taking on his pastoral duties, he was sent to Rome in 1932 to study Canon Law at the Pontifical Institute of St. Apollinare, and graduated on January 8, 1937. Being regarded as a skilled organizer, he was later appointed secretary of the Curia in the Diocese of Nueva Segovia.

== Episcopacy ==
Ordination history of Mariano Madriaga
History
Priestly ordination
- Ordained by: Santiago Caragnan Sancho (Nueva Segovia)
Episcopal consecration
- Principal consecrator: Gabriel Martelino Reyes (Manila)
- Co-consecrators: Santiago Caragnan Sancho; Constant Jurgens
Episcopal succession
Bishops consecrated by Mariano Madriaga as principal consecrator
- Jesus Juan Acosta Sison: 11 May 1963

In a secret consistory on December 16, 1937, Pope Pius XI appointed Madriaga as an auxiliary to Bishop Francisco Reyes of Nueva Caceres. However, the appointment was voided because the bishop died the day before. He was later appointed as bishop of the Diocese of Lingayen during another consistory on March 17, 1938, succeeding Bishop Cesar Guerrero who was transferred to Manila to serve as auxiliary to Archbishop Michael O'Doherty. On May 23 of the same year, he took possession of the diocese and was consecrated the next day by Archbishop Gabriel Reyes of Cebu together with several other bishops of the Philippine hierarchy. He was 36 when he was consecrated bishop.

During the organization of the Catholic Welfare Organization (the predecessor to the Catholic Bishop's Conference of the Philippines), Madriaga was a member of the Board of Directors, and at one point in the 1950s, he served as the chairman of the Episcopal Commission on Ecclesiastical Art & Construction.

He repeatedly requested the Holy See for the transfer of the seat of the diocese from Lingayen to Dagupan after the former was destroyed during World War II. Pope Pius XII heeded to the request and renamed the diocese to "Lingayen-Dagupan" on February 11, 1954. Pope St. John XXIII later elevated the see into an archdiocese on February 16, 1963 Bishop Madriaga was installed as archbishop on May 10, 1963.

He laid the cornerstone for the new Dagupan Cathedral on May 31, 1964.

He participated as a Council Father in the first and second sessions of the Second Vatican Council in 1962 and 1963.

== Heraldry and Art ==
Madriaga was reputed to be the official heraldist of the Catholic Church in the Philippines, having designed more than a hundred coats of arms of dioceses and prelates. He was credited for the introduction of designing a diocesan arms and impaling it with the personal arms of the incumbent bishop in the Philippines, a tradition that started in the United States by heraldist Pierre de Chaignon la Rose at the beginning of the 20th century. Most notably, he blazoned the arms of one of the Filipino bishops declared Venerable (Teofilo Camomot), three Filipino cardinals (Julio Rosales, Jaime Sin, and Ricardo Vidal), as well as the arms of their respective archdioceses (Manila and Cebu).

Majority of his work during the 1950s are published in the Boletin Eclesiastico de Filipinas, a monthly interdiocesan bulletin managed by the University of Santo Tomas. He also published a series of articles in the Atenean journal Philippine Studies from 1957 to 1958, explaining the coats of arms of the Philippine ecclesiastical territories during this period.

His heraldic work may also be seen in the stained glass windows of Santo Domingo Church, Quezon City, depicting the coats of arms of all incumbent bishops in the Philippines during the construction of the church in the 1950s. The windows were executed by his fellow heraldist and National Artist Galo Ocampo.

Aside from being a heraldist and scholar, he was also an artist and a sculptor, modelling plastic and bronze. His works include a bust of Pope St. John XXIII in the Pontificio Collegio Filippino, the statues of St. John the Evangelist in the Dagupan Cathedral, Pope St. Paul VI in the Apostolic Nunciature in Manila, and Pope St. John Paul II at the Basilica Minore of Our Lady of Charity which was his last sculpture.

== Resignation and death ==
He resigned on February 7, 1973, at the age of 70, and was succeeded by Federico Limon, who had previously been coadjutor of the archdiocese. He died on November 1, 1981, and was buried in his hometown in the crypt of the Basilica Minore of Our Lady of Charity.

== Gallery ==
Coat of arms of the Diocese of Lingayen, designed by Madriaga in 1938.

Coat of arms of the Archdiocese of Manila designed by Madriaga in 1949.

Coat of arms of the Archdiocese of Cebu designed by Madriaga in 1950, discontinued in 2009.

Coat of arms of the Archdiocese of Nueva Segovia, designed by Madriaga in 1951.

Coat of arms of the Archdiocese of Palo, designed by Madriaga in 1951.

Coat of arms of the Archdiocese of Lingayen-Dagupan, designed by Madriaga in 1954. The archdiocese replaced the crowns with a star in 1991.

Coat of arms of the Archdiocese of Zamboanga, modified by Madriaga in 1958 from the initial design by American ecclesiastical heraldist Pierre de Chaignon la Rose in 1917.

Coat of arms of the Diocese of Laoag, designed by Madriaga in 1961.

Coat of arms of Mariano Madriaga as Bishop of Lingayen, designed by himself in 1938.

Coat of arms of Juan Callanta Sison, Auxiliary Bishop of Nueva Segovia, designed by Madriaga in 1947.

Coat of arms of Julio Rosales y Ras, Archbishop of Cebu, designed by Madriaga in 1950.

Coat of arms of Lino Rasdesales Gonzaga, Bishop of Palo, designed by Madriaga in 1951.

Coat of arms of Teofilo Camomot, Auxiliary Bishop of Jaro, designed by Madriaga in 1955.

Coat of arms of Emilio Cinense y Abera, Bishop of San Fernando, designed by Madriaga in 1957.

Coat of arms of Jaime Sin, Auxiliary Bishop of Jaro, designed by Madriaga in 1967.

Coat of arms of Ricardo Jamin Vidal, Coadjutor Bishop of Malolos, designed by Madriaga in 1971.

Coat of arms of Edmundo Madarang Abaya, Bishop of Laoag, designed by Madriaga in 1978.

Catholic Church titles
Preceded by Cesar Maria Guerrero	Bishop of Lingayen; May 24, 1938 – February 11, 1934	Succeeded by Himself as Bishop of Lingayen–Dagupan
Preceded by Himself as Bishop of Lingayen	Bishop of Lingayen–Dagupan; February 11, 1934 – February 16, 1963	Succeeded by Himself as Archbishop of Lingayen–Dagupan
Preceded by Himself as Bishop of Lingayen–Dagupan	Archbishop of Lingayen–Dagupan; February 16, 1963 – February 7, 1973	Succeeded by Federico Guba Limon SVD
