= Napoleon Sipalay =

Filipino prelate

The Most Reverend Napoleon B. Sipalay O.P., D.D.
- Bishop of Alaminos
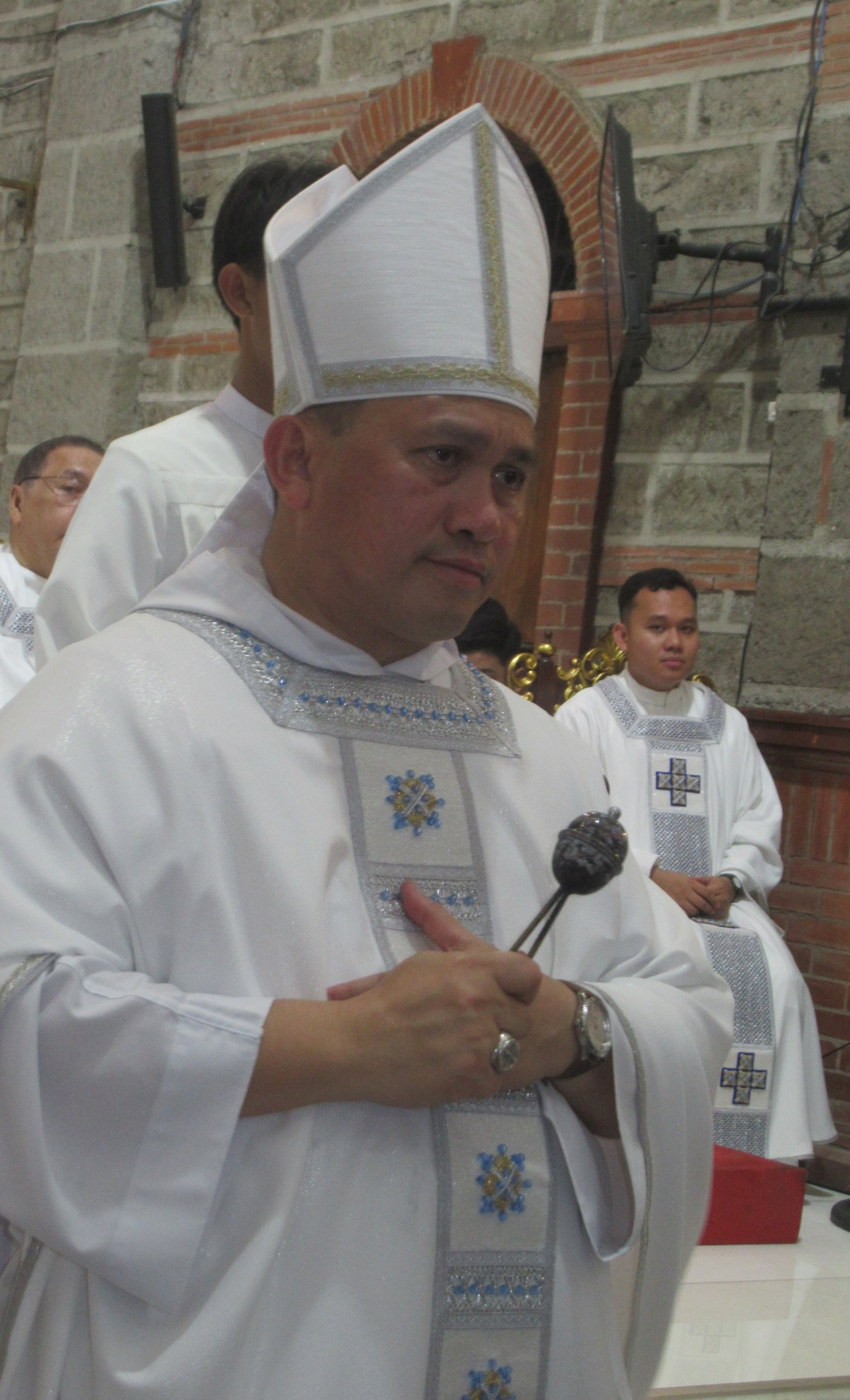
- Province: Lingayen-Dagupan
- See: Alaminos
- Appointed: January 28, 2024
- Installed: March 19, 2024
- Predecessor: Ricardo Baccay
- Successor: Incumbent
- Previous posts: Prior Provincial, Dominican Province of the Philippines (2016–2021)

Orders
- Ordination: April 5, 1997
- Consecration: March 18, 2024 by Socrates Villegas

Personal details
- Born: Napoleon Balili Sipalay; October 20, 1970 (age 56) Davao City, Philippines
- Denomination: Roman Catholic
- Motto: Misericordiam Dei et Vestram ("God's Mercy and Yours")

Ordination history
History
Episcopal consecration
- Principal consecrator: Socrates Villegas
- Co-consecrators: Jacinto Jose; Fidelis Layog
- Styles
- Reference style: His Excellency; The Most Reverend
- Spoken style: Your Excellency
- Religious style: Bishop

Napoleon Balili Sipalay Jr. O.P. (born October 20, 1970) is a Filipino prelate and member of the Dominican Order who serves as Bishop of Alaminos since March 19, 2024. He was the first Dominican bishop appointed in the Philippines in three decades.

== Biography ==
=== Early life ===
Sipalay was born on October 20, 1970, in Davao City.

=== 1988–1997: Religious life ===
He entered the Order of Preachers in 1988 and made his first Profession in 1991. He completed his philosophy degree at the Philippine Dominican Center of Institutional Studies in 1992. He completed his bachelor's degree in sacred theology in 1995 and completed his licentiate in 1997.

=== 1997-2024: Priesthood ===
On April 5, 1997, he was ordained to the priesthood. He was appointment as the Assistant Master of Students and Novice Master of the Dominican Province of the Philippines before being assigned as a missionary in Sri Lanka from 2006 to 2015, during which he held various positions including a teaching role at the National Seminary of Our Lady of Lanka in Kandy.

Sipalay also served as the secretary to the Committee for Religious Formation of the Conference of Major Religious Superiors of Sri Lanka from 2009 to 2015. In 2015, he was appointed as the prior of the Dominican community of Minor Basilica of Our Lady of the Rosary of Manaoag in Pangasinan, before he was elected the prior provincial and University of Santo Tomas' vice-chancellor from 2016 to 2021.

=== 2024–present: Bishop of Alaminos ===
On January 28, 2024, Sipalay was appointed by Pope Francis as the new Bishop of Alaminos after four years of sede vacante. The appointment made him the third Filipino Dominican to be elevated to the episcopate, following the Archbishop Leonardo Legaspi of Caceres and the Auxiliary Bishop Jose Salazar of Lipa.

He was ordained as bishop on March 18, 2024, which was attended by his consecrators: Archbishop Socrates Villegas of Lingayen-Dagupan, Bishop Jacinto Jose of Urdaneta, and Auxiliary Bishop Fidelis Layog of Lingayen-Dagupan, the Apostolic Nuncio to the Philippines Charles John Brown and Cardinal Archbishop Jose Advincula, who was also the homilist of the Mass. He was installed the following day at the Saint Joseph the Patriarch Cathedral Parish, Alaminos City in Pangasinan.

Catholic Church titles
Preceded by Gerard Timoner III	Prior Provincial of the Dominican Province in the Philippines; October 21, 2016 – January 18, 2021	Succeeded by Filemon Dela Cruz
Preceded by Ricardo Baccay	Bishop of Alaminos; March 19, 2024 – present	Incumbent
