= Diocese of Alaminos =

Latin Catholic diocese in the Philippines

Diocese of Alaminos Dioecesis Alaminensis Diosis na Alaminos Diocesis ti Alaminos Diyosesis ng Alaminos Diocesis de Alaminos

Catholic
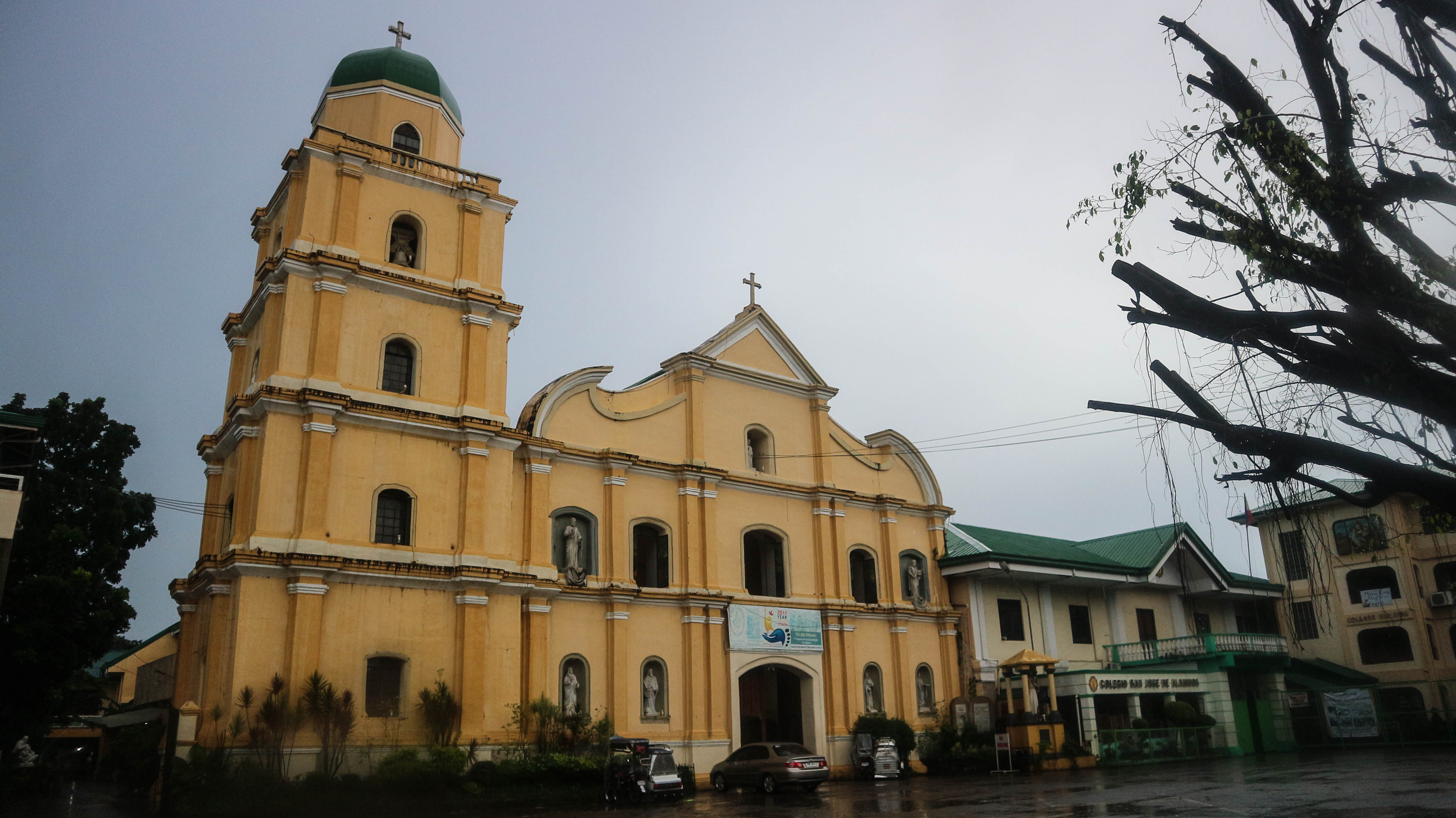
- Alaminos Cathedral

- Coat of arms

Location
- Country: Philippines
- Territory: Western Pangasinan (Agno, Aguilar, Alaminos, Anda, Bani, Bolinao, Bugallon, Burgos, Dasol, Infanta, Labrador, Mabini, Mangatarem, Sual)
- Ecclesiastical province: Lingayen–Dagupan
- Headquarters: Alaminos, Pangasinan
- Coordinates: 16.16021700°N 119.98029100°E

Statistics
- Area: 2,449 km^{2} (946 sq mi)
- Population: Total; Catholics: (as of 2021); 793,366; 651,797 (82.2%)
- Parishes: 21

Information
- Denomination: Catholic Church
- Sui iuris church: Latin Church
- Rite: Roman Rite
- Established: January 12, 1985
- Cathedral: Cathedral-Parish of St. Joseph the Patriarch
- Patron saint: Joseph the Patriarch
- Secular priests: 36

Current leadership
- Pope: Leo XIV
- Bishop: Napoleon Balili Sipalay, Jr., OP
- Metropolitan Archbishop: Socrates Buenaventura Villegas
- Vicar General: Lain Mayo
- Bishops emeritus: Jesus Aputen Cabrera

The Diocese of Alaminos (Latin: Dioecesis Alaminensis) is a Latin Church ecclesiastical jurisdiction or diocese of the Catholic Church in the Philippines.

The diocese was erected on January 12, 1985, and comprises 14 municipalities in the western part of the province of Pangasinan. The diocese has experienced no jurisdictional changes since then, and is a suffragan of the Archdiocese of Lingayen–Dagupan.

== History ==
On the Feast of St. Thomas Aquinas, January 28, 2024, Pope Francis appointed Napoleon Balili Sipalay, Jr., of the Order of Preachers, then-vice rector of the University of Santo Tomas Central Seminary, to be the new bishop of Alaminos. His episcopal ordination by ordaining Archbishop Socrates Villegas with Bishop Jacinto Agcaoili Jose and Auxiliary Bishop Fidelis Bautista Layog as co-consecrators was held on March 18 at Manaoag Church. His solemn installation and canonical possession as the fourth bishop of the diocese was held on March 19, 2024 at the Alaminos Cathedral.

== Ordinaries ==
No.	Picture	Name	From	Until	Notes	Coat of arms
1		Jesus Aputen Cabrera	June 28, 1985 (Appointed April 22, 1985)	July 1, 2007	Retired from office	
2		Marlo Mendoza Peralta	July 1, 2007	December 30, 2013	Appointed Archbishop of Nueva Segovia	
3		Ricardo Lingan Baccay	May 4, 2016 (Appointed February 20, 2016)	October 18, 2019	Appointed Archbishop of Tuguegarao	
4		Napoleon Balili Sipalay Jr., O.P.	March 19, 2024 (Appointed January 28, 2024)	present		

== See also ==
- Catholic Church in the Philippines
- List of Catholic dioceses in the Philippines
