= Socrates Villegas =

Filipino Archbishop of Lingayen-Dagupan

The Most Reverend Sócrates B. Villegas O.P.
- Metropolitan Archbishop of Lingayen-Dagupan
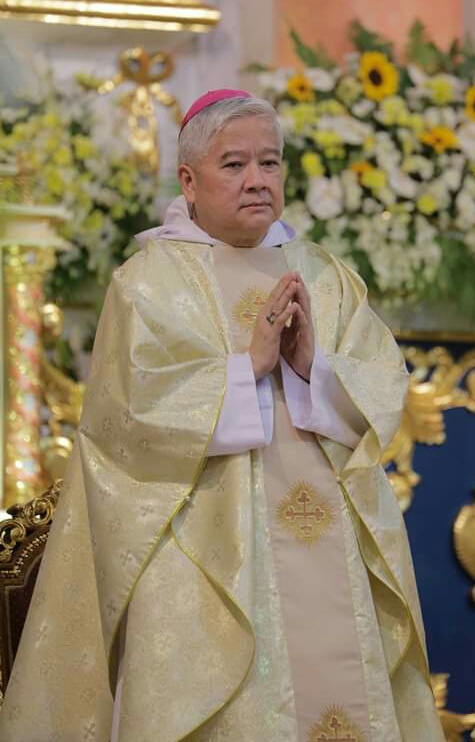
- Archbishop Villegas during the solemn declaration of the New Basilica of Saint Dominic, circa 2023.
- Province: Lingayen-Dagupan
- See: Lingayen-Dagupan
- Appointed: September 8, 2009
- Installed: November 4, 2009
- Predecessor: Oscar V. Cruz
- Successor: Incumbent
- Previous posts: Priest, Archdiocese of Manila (1985–2001); Rector, EDSA Shrine (1989–2004); Titular Bishop of Nona (2001–2004); Auxiliary Bishop of Manila (2001–2004); Chairman, CBCP Episcopal Commission on Catechesis and Catholic Education (2003–2011); Bishop of Balanga (2004–2009); Vice President, Catholic Bishops' Conference of the Philippines (2011–2013); Apostolic Administrator of San Fernando de La Union (2011–2013); President of the Catholic Bishops' Conference of the Philippines (2013–2017); Chairman, CBCP Episcopal Commission on Seminaries (2019–2025)

Orders
- Ordination: October 5, 1985 by Jaime Sin
- Consecration: August 31, 2001 by Jaime Sin

Personal details
- Born: Sócrates Buenaventura Villegas; September 28, 1960 (age 66) Pateros, Rizal, Philippines
- Denomination: Roman Catholic
- Occupation: Archbishop, Priest
- Motto: Pax (Latin for 'Peace') (Note: From Psalm 46:9)
- Coat of arms: Sócrates B. Villegas's coat of arms

Ordination history
History
Priestly ordination
- Ordained by: Jaime Lachica Sin (Manila)
Episcopal consecration
- Principal consecrator: Jaime Lachica Sin (Manila)
- Co-consecrators: Crisostomo Yalung; Jesse Mercado
Episcopal succession
Bishops consecrated by Socrates Villegas as principal consecrator
- Narciso Villaver Abellana: December 11, 2013
- Enrique Macaraeg: May 24, 2016
- Jose Elmer Mangalinao: August 22, 2016
- Fidelis Layog: March 18, 2019
- Napoleon Sipalay, Jr., O.P.: March 18, 2024
- Rafael T. Cruz: September 7, 2024
- Rufino Sescon, Jr., O.P.: February 25, 2025

Styles of Sócrates B. Villegas
- Reference style: His Excellency; The Most Reverend
- Spoken style: Your Excellency
- Religious style: Archbishop

Sócrates Buenaventura Villegas, O.P. (born September 28, 1960) is a Filipino prelate, and a professed member of the Dominican Order. He is the fifth and current Archbishop of Lingayen-Dagupan in Pangasinan since November 4, 2009, and is the former president of the Catholic Bishops' Conference of the Philippines from December 1, 2013 to November 30, 2017, previously serving as the vice president of the episcopal conference from 2011 to 2013.

A protégé of the late Manila Archbishop Cardinal Jaime Sin, Villegas previously served as rector of EDSA Shrine from December 8, 1989 to July 3, 2004, Auxiliary Bishop of Manila from August 31, 2001 to July 2004, and as the third Bishop of Balanga in Bataan from May 3, 2004 to November 4, 2009, succeeding Honesto Ongtioco who was assigned as the first Bishop of Cubao in Quezon City on August 28, 2003.

== Family and education ==
The youngest of the three children of Emiliano Villegas and Norma Buenaventura both from Pateros, he was born on September 28, 1960, when the town was still part of Rizal province.

He went through basic education at the Pateros Elementary School, Pateros Catholic School and Colegio de San Juan de Letran. He studied for the priesthood at San Carlos Seminary with a degree Master of Arts in Theological Studies.

== Ministry ==
=== 1985–2001: Priesthood ===
He was ordained priest by Cardinal Jaime Sin on October 5, 1985, at the Manila Cathedral. Villegas served as Sin's personal secretary for fifteen years, and as vicar general of the Archdiocese of Manila for thirteen years. He then became the first Rector of the EDSA Shrine and Vicar General of the Archdiocese of Manila in concurrent capacity.

=== 2001–2004: Auxiliary Bishop of Manila ===
Appointed auxiliary bishop of Manila on July 25, 2001, he was ordained by Cardinal Sin to the episcopacy on August 31, 2001. He held that position, together with being the rector of EDSA Shrine, until his transfer to Balanga on July 3, 2004. Before his election as president of the bishops' conference, he was Bishop Chairman of the Episcopal Commission for Catechesis and Catholic Education. He is the current Bishop Chairman of the Episcopal Commission for Seminaries since 2019 until 2026.

=== 2004–2009: Bishop of Balanga ===
On May 3, 2004, Villegas was named as third Bishop of Balanga by Pope John Paul II. His installation on July 3 ended the diocese's ten-month sede vacante period or without a bishop in office under diocesan administrator Antonio Dumaual. His installation ceremony or assumption into office as the diocese's third bishop was presided by Apostolic Nuncio to the Philippines Antonio Franco and Archbishop of San Fernando, Pampanga Paciano Aniceto.

During his tenure as Bishop of Balanga, he saw that the interior of Balanga Cathedral were in bad shape; he renovated the inside with a new design from October 2004 to 2005. When it was finished, the white walls were replaced by a wall of bricks, the structure behind the altar became marble white, the floors were higher, the lectern bearing the coat of arms of diocese of Balanga was replaced with the one with Holy Spirit, and the chandeliers were replaced by ceiling lights.

On November 27, 2004, Villegas started the Mt. Samat Pilgrimage which is the diocese's annual event held on November or December of the year and is attended by thousands of young people from Bataan and different provinces in Luzon, except in 2024 where the pilgrimage was not held due to no Bishop of Balanga yet and available person to preside the celebration on that year. The pilgrims walk seven kilometers from the foot of Mt. Samat up to the World War II shrine on top of the mountain. The event's theme song is "Bataan: Bayani at Banal" composed by Villegas which also serves as the anthem of the diocese. This is due to his previous background as CEO of World Youth Day 1995 and World Meeting for Families 2003 where he envisoned to implement the similar event locally in the diocese.

He began the six-years term of the diocese on October 22, 2005 where each rectors and parish priests of its churches serve within that term, except if the designation is controversial, dies, Bishop of Balanga decides to have a fill-in for the remaining part, and if there is no priest available, the official position is vacant and instead the bishop will become a parish administrator for that particular parish.

From 2006 to 2008, Villegas decreed the creation of three Catholic schools in Bataan which are St. Joseph's College of Balanga City, Upper Tuyo, Balanga City (2006), Blessed Regina Protmann Catholic School, Mt. View, Mariveles (2007), and St. James Catholic School of Morong (2008).

In 2008, 15 life-size images of saints with their names were added outside the cathedral representing the patron saints from the 11 towns and 1 city of Bataan where the Diocese of Balanga has jurisdiction with and a few towns have multiple saints. The statue of St. Gemma Galgani was then later added as the 16th and latest statue five years later in 2013 during the tenure of his successor Ruperto Santos due to St. Gemma Galgani Church in Mt. View, Mariveles, Bataan became a parish on July 21, 2012 which included on a roster of the diocese's churches and parishes.

Also on the same year, Villegas contacted the Sisters of Notre Dame, represented by Sister Mary Sujita Kallupurakattu, with a request to provide Sisters for a retreat center in Upper Tuyo. Land had been donated by a certain Mrs. Roxas, and he wanted to use it for this purpose. Sister Maria Yosefa (Indonesia), Sister Maresa Lilley, and Sister Mary Theresa Betz (United States) accompanied Villegas up the mountain to view the site, still grass and jungle. Soon after, the land was prepared for building under the leadership of architect Gary Mariano. The plan was to include two round houses for the Sisters and for the international formees of the Sisters of Notre Dame, and then to have adequate spaces for housing retreatants and retreat groups. A dining hall, a multipurpose room and 10 hermitages were prepared. Donations came from several sources that included Mr. Daniel Meehan of the United States, two provinces, Netherlands and England, of the Sisters of Notre Dame. The name “Stella Maris” (Star of the Sea) was decided upon because of our English Sisters’ part in supporting the project. It was the name of their province, and all thought the name most appropriate for the Philippines. By mid-2009, the two round houses were ready enough to house the Sisters, and July 31, 2009 was the day they moved in. Building continued into the next year under the leadership of Gary Mariano. The hope was to provide light and grace to people who came to the mountain to be refreshed.

On December 8, 2008, Clinica Diocesano de San Jose, the diocese's clinic, was founded which is a weekly medical and dental mission for the poor people of Bataan. It was originally located within the Balanga Cathedral compound before having its own building in 2022 along Quezon Street in Balanga, with it built from 2021 to 2022 under Santos.

On August 5, 2009, Bishop Villegas, along with then-Manila Archbishop Cardinal Gaudencio Rosales, officiated at the Requiem Mass for former President of the Philippines Corazon Aquino held at the Manila Cathedral. Also on that same year, images featuring the ancestors of Jesus and image of Jesus Christ at the cathedral's dome were added months before he became fifth archbishop of Lingayen-Dagupan in Pangasinan on November 4 after celebrating his final mass as Bishop of Balanga as a preparation for ending his tenure as the diocese's third bishop and becoming archbishop of the said archdiocese.

=== 2009–present: Archbishop of Lingayen-Dagupan ===
Pope Benedict XVI named Villegas as archbishop of Lingayen-Dagupan on September 8, 2009, to succeed Oscar Cruz. Villegas was then installed upon Cruz's retirement as the archdiocese's archbishop on November 4, 2009, ending his 5 years, 6 months, and 1 day tenure as third Bishop of Balanga. He was succeeded by Ruperto Santos upon his appointment to the position as fourth Bishop of Balanga on April 1, 2010 and installed into office on July 8, 2010. Santos served as the diocese's fourth bishop and Villegas' successor from April 1, 2010 until he became fifth Bishop of Antipolo covering Marikina in Metro Manila and the province of Rizal on July 22, 2023.

After his tenure as third bishop of Balanga, he made various returns to Bataan, such as the Mt. Samat Pilgrimage in November 2009 and December 2023 (although the last pilgrimage year while Villegas was in position as the diocese's bishop is 2008 and he already became archbishop of Lingayen-Dagupan since November 4, 2009, he presided the pilgrimage once more in 2009 and 2023), ordination of Rev. Fr. Jhoen Buenaventura on December 7, 2009, dedication of Stella Maris Retreat Center on January 10, 2010, the installation of Santos into office and ceremony for Ruperto Santos to become fifth bishop on July 8, 2010 and March 1, 2025 respectively, and the mass for the 50th anniversary celebration of the diocese on March 18, 2025.

Due to the sudden death of San Fernando de La Union Bishop Artemio Rillera, he became the Apostolic Administrator of the said vacant See from November 13, 2011 to January 19, 2013, in a concurrent capacity.

He was the Chairman of the Episcopal Commission for Catechesis and Catholic Education of the CBCP from 2003 until 2012 and formerly a member of the Presidential Committee of the Pontifical Council for the Family. He was also Chairman of the CBCP Episcopal Commission for Seminaries from 2019 to 2025.

He joined the Order of Preachers in 2015. He is a chaplain of the Order of Malta and the Equestrian Order of the Holy Sepulchre.

He was a synodal father in the Synod of Bishops of 2012 and 2014. He is a member of the Council of the papal foundation Aid to the Church in Need.

As of August 2026, he has ordained 247 deacons, 290 priests, and seven bishops since his episcopal ordination. In the Archdiocese of Lingayen Dagupan, he has decreed the creation of twelve new parishes and nine quasi parishes, since he became archbishop on November 4, 2009, by opening the archdiocese to the missionary presence of religious priests.

He opened the first archdiocesan theology seminary in northern Philippines in 2013 called Mary Help of Christians Theology Seminary which grants civil master's degrees in theology and pastoral ministry.

== Civic involvement ==
In the secular field, he was one of the Ten Outstanding Young Men of the Philippines in the year 2000 and a Catholic Authors Awardee in 1994. The Bataan Peninsula State University conferred upon him a Doctor of Humanities degree honoris causa in recognition of his work for the Province of Bataan. He authored ten books of homilies and spiritual meditations since he was priest of the Archdiocese of Manila until now. In January 2023, Saint Louis University in Baguio City conferred on him the degree of Doctor of Philosophy honoris causa in recognition of his contribution to the field of social philosophy and ethics.

== Activity ==
He is a member of Dominican Clerical Fraternity of the Philippines (DCFP), the Sovereign Military Order of Malta and the Equestrian Order of the Holy Sepulchre of Jerusalem. He was the CEO of the Tenth World Youth Day held in Manila in 1995 and the Fourth World Meeting of Families in 2003.

In August 2005, Villegas told Filipino Catholics that they "cannot participate in any way or even attend religious or legal ceremonies that celebrate and legitimize homosexual unions".

=== Political involvement ===
Villegas' views on social and political issues in the Philippines have not been without controversy, mainly regarding high-profile issues such as the Reproductive Health Bill, the re-imposition of death penalty (long-opposed by the Catholic Church), human rights violations, extrajudicial killings under the administration of President Rodrigo Duterte, and the burial of dictator Ferdinand Marcos at the Libingan ng mga Bayani (Heroes' Cemetery).

Following the 31st Anniversary of the 1986 EDSA People Power Revolution on February 25, 2017, Villegas published a 'letter' to his mentor, Cardinal Jaime Sin, where he denounced corruption, extrajudicial killings, and the restoration of the Marcos family to political power under the Duterte administration. Villegas lamented that "the dictator ousted by People Power is now buried among heroes. The Lady of one thousand two hundred pairs of shoes is now Representative in Congress." Villegas' remarks were criticized by Duterte's daughter, then-Davao City mayor Sara Duterte, who described Villegas as "worse than a hundred President Dutertes".

On July 19, 2019, the PNP–Criminal Investigation and Detection Group (CIDG) filed charges against Villegas and members of the opposition for "sedition, cyber libel, libel, estafa, harboring a criminal, and obstruction of justice". Members of the opposition, as well as local and international human rights groups including Human Rights Watch and Amnesty International, denounced the charges as a politically motivated move intended to silence criticism of Duterte and his presidency. The charges were eventually dropped because of lack of evidence.

In regards to vote buying, Villegas expressed the position that a voters who accept money from people to vote for certain politicians may not be necessarily committing a sin – if the voter does not fulfill their agreement even if they accept the money.

Due to the non-renewal of broadcast franchise application of ABS-CBN, Villegas expressed that the network's issues could have been dealt in with proper proceedings and decried that shutting down from the airwaves, reminding the Philippine government of the importance of free press in a democratic country.

In October 2023, Villegas publicly stated that the International Criminal Court (ICC) investigators should be allowed to probe into alleged extrajudicial killings and human rights abuses under Duterte's "war on drugs." Duterte would later become the first Filipino and Asian leader to be arrested by the ICC on charges of crimes against humanity, following Interpol's enforcement of an ICC arrest warrant against Duterte in March 2025.

In June 2025, Villegas criticized the Senate of the Philippines for delaying the impeachment trial of Sara Duterte, calling it a sin and a morally unacceptable move. He also denounced government procrastination, calling it a "a lack of diligence or commitment".

== Coat of arms ==
Coat of arms of Socrates Villegas
Adopted November 4, 2009 Helm Archbishop's Galero; The shield is surmounted by the archbishop's galero or ecclesiastical hat of this rank with ten tassels for each side in Vert (green) that signifies the rank of an Archbishop. It also has a pallium signifying the title of a metropolitan archbishop. Escutcheon From 2009: Parted per fess: The nimbed silver (argent) eagle is the symbol of Saint John the Apostle and Evangelist, the titular of the cathedral at Dagupan. The three gold (or) Oriental crowns represent the Three Wise Kings, the titular of the co-cathedral at Lingayen. The red (gules) wavy pile represents Lingayen Gulf. The green (vert) field represents the "rice-bowl" of the Philippines, the whole of Pangasinan and Nueva Ecija. The three heraldic roses represent our Lady whose shrine in Manaoag is the jewel of the archdiocese; Impaled with a shield tierced per fess: Blessed Mother's mantle of blue (azure), white (argent) diagonal line with barbed wire, and silhouette of San Carlos Borromeo on a red (gules) background. Motto PAX "Peace" The motto was taken from John 20:19 ("On the evening of that first day of the week, when the disciples were together, with the doors locked for fear of the Jewish leaders, Jesus came and stood among them and said, “Peace be with you!"), Luke 10:5 ("When you enter a house, first say, ‘Peace to this house."), and Matthew 5:9 ("Blessed are the peacemakers: for they shall be called the children of God."). Other elements Archbishop's Cross; The shield is also surmounted by an archbishop's cross, symbolizing the archbishop's dignity. Symbolism The Marian symbol "M" represents the archbishop's devotion and dedication to the Blessed Virgin Mary. The Blessed Mother's mantle of blue is his source of consolation and peace in all the challenges of his life. The diagonal line with barbed wire symbolizes the EDSA People Power Revolution of 1986 and 2001 which are historical events that shaped his pastoral ministry and to the heroic struggle of the Filipinos during World War II. The white background symbolizes the archbishop's involvement for the cause of peace. The silhouette of San Carlos Borromeo on a red background is the patron of San Carlos Seminary of the Archdiocese of Manila, where he studied for the priesthood. Red also signifies the cardinal's color, referring to his love and esteem to the former Archbishop of Manila, Cardinal Jaime Sin. Previous versions Bishop of Balanga (June 2004–November 4, 2009) Auxiliary Bishop of Manila (August 31, 2001–July 3, 2004)

== Notes ==
Catholic Church titles
New title	Rector of EDSA Shrine; December 8, 1989 – July 3, 2004	Succeeded by Victor Y. Apacible
Preceded by Joan Enric Vives i Sicília	— TITULAR — Bishop of Nona; August 31, 2001 – July 3, 2004	Succeeded by Martin Vidović
Preceded by Honesto F. Ongtioco	Bishop of Balanga; May 3, 2004 – November 4, 2009	Succeeded by Ruperto C. Santos
Preceded by Oscar V. Cruz	Archbishop of Lingayen–Dagupan; November 4, 2009 – present	Incumbent
Preceded by José S. Palma	CBCP President; December 1, 2013 – November 30, 2017	Succeeded by Romulo G. Valles
