= Dagupan Cathedral =

Roman Catholic church in Pangasinan, Philippines

- Metropolitan Cathedral Parish of St. John the Evangelist
- Catedral Metropolitana de San Juan el Evangelista (Filipino)
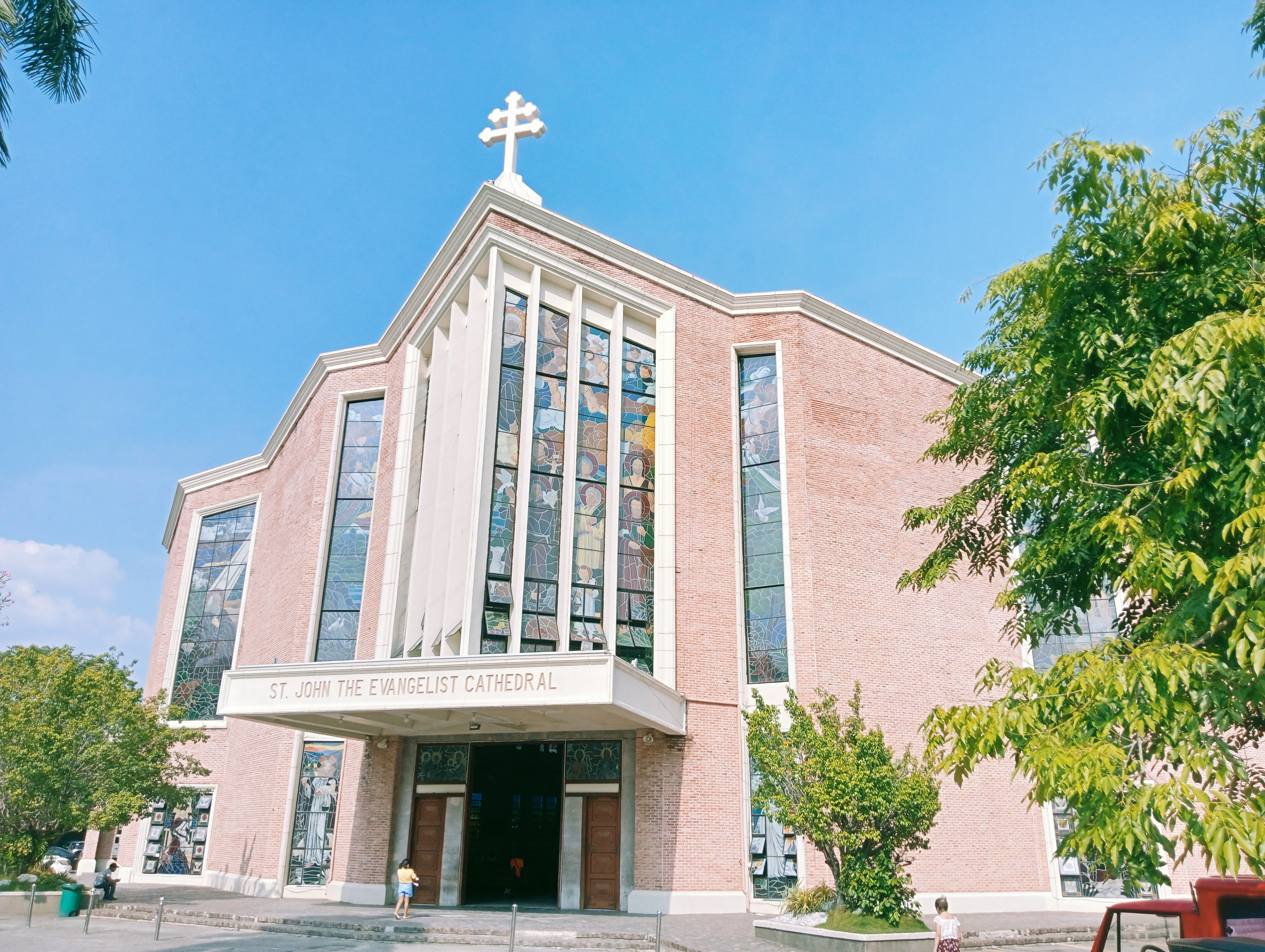
- Cathedral facade in 2024

- Location in Luzon Location in the Philippines
- 16°02′32″N 120°20′04″E
- Location: Dagupan, Pangasinan
- Country: Philippines
- Denomination: Roman Catholic
- Website: www.facebook.com/dagupancathedral

History
- Status: Cathedral
- Dedication: Saint John the Evangelist

Architecture
- Functional status: active
- Architectural type: Church building
- Groundbreaking: 1964
- Completed: 1974

Administration
- Archdiocese: Lingayen-Dagupan

Clergy
- Archbishop: Socrates B. Villegas
- Rector: Manuel Bravo Jr.
- Priests: Laurence Mark Lucero; Roberto Mejia; Jovino Vatican; Eymard Mark Gayotin

The Metropolitan Cathedral Parish of St. John the Evangelist, commonly known as Dagupan Cathedral, is located along Burgos Street in Dagupan, Pangasinan, Philippines. It is the cathedral of the Roman Catholic Archdiocese of Lingayen-Dagupan. Its titular head is Archbishop Socrates B. Villegas.

== History ==
A church was built in the early 1660's, though the church was destroyed by the 1660 Dagupan rebellion. The church was rebuilt in 1816, by Fr. Vicente Iztequi.

== Features and layout ==
The church contained hints of Spanish architecture, with large exterior buttressess, built with bricks and mortar. One side, a traditional belfry sat.

== Gallery ==
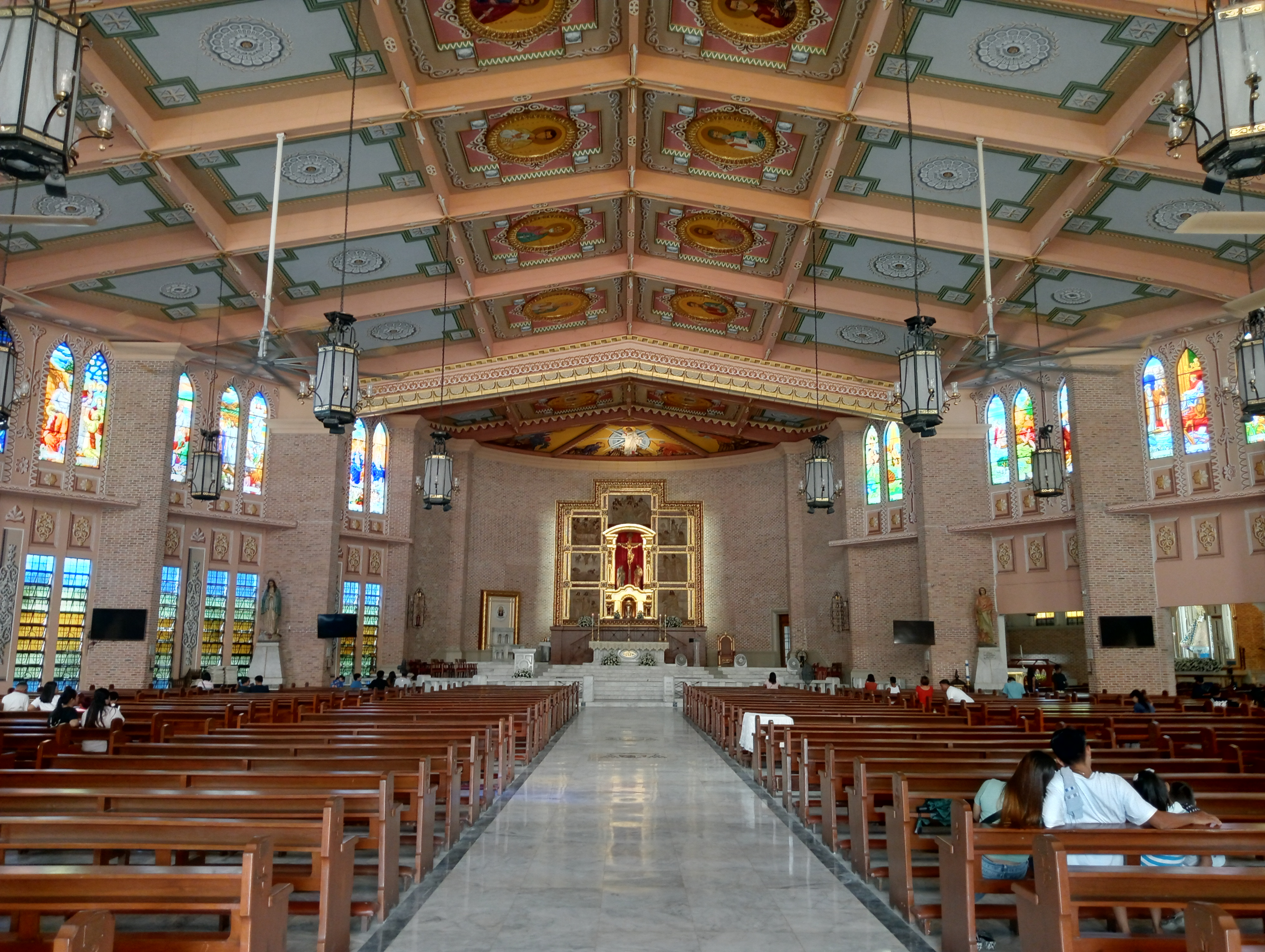
Cathedral interior in 2024

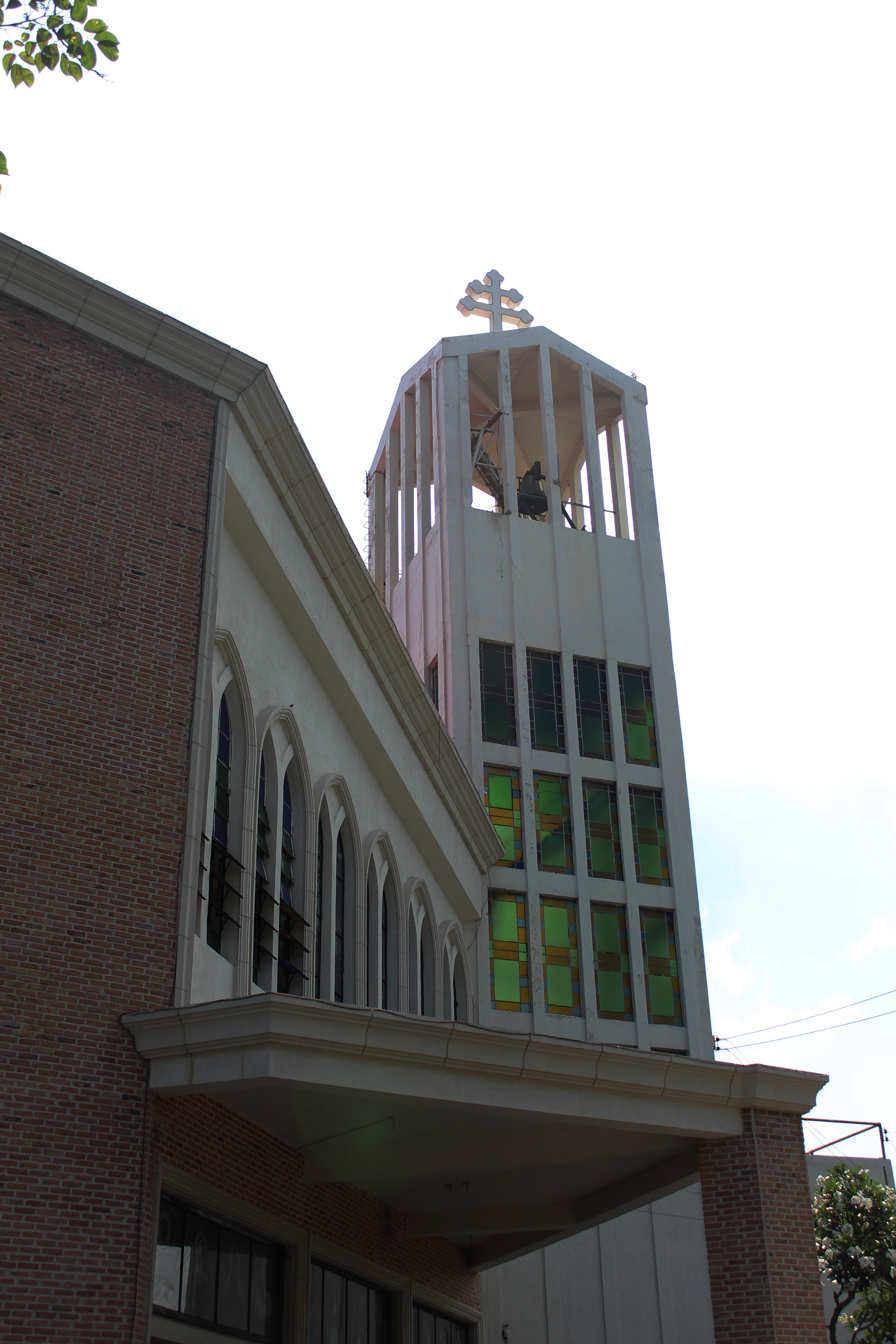
Cathedral bell tower

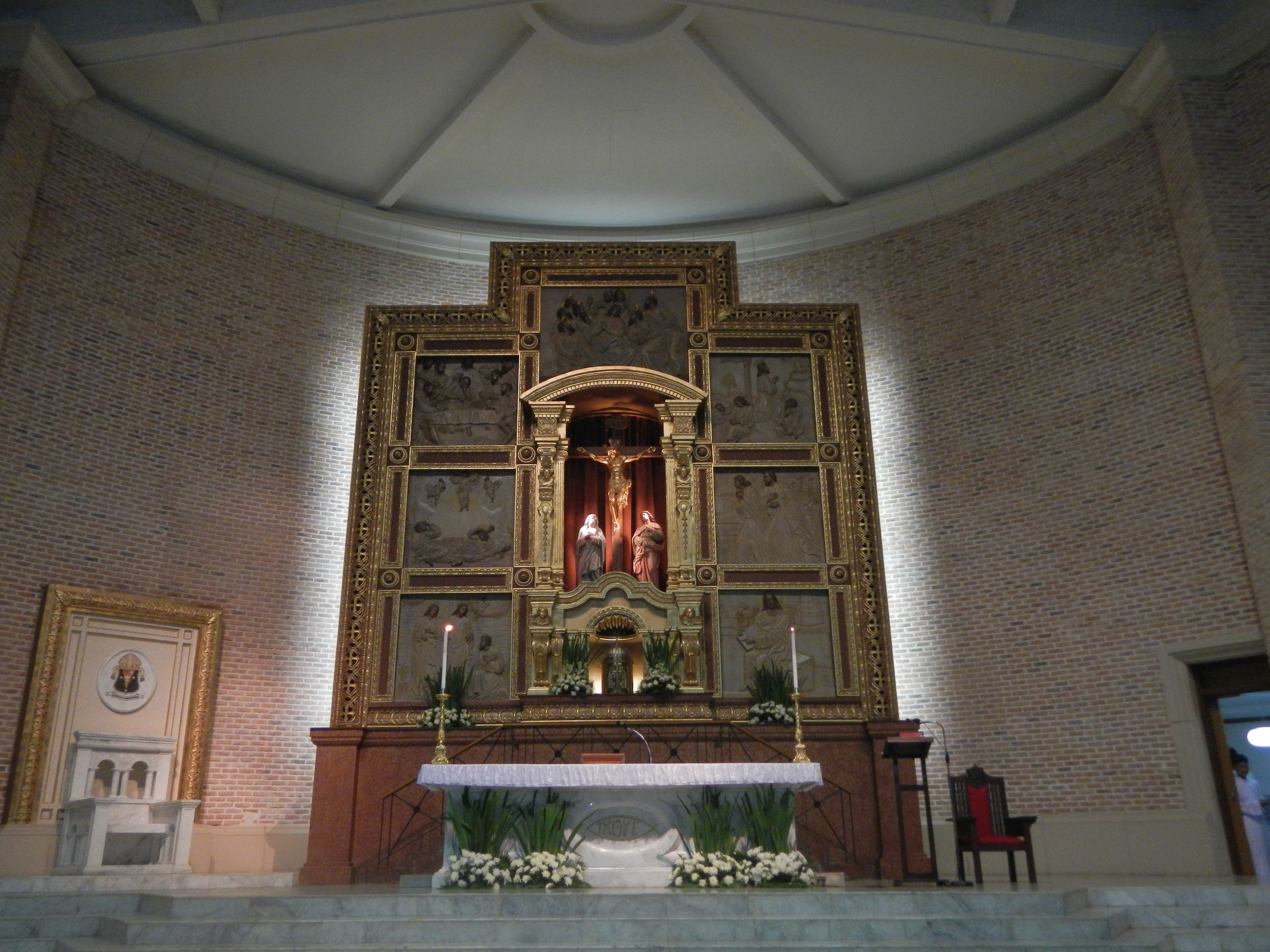
Cathedral altar

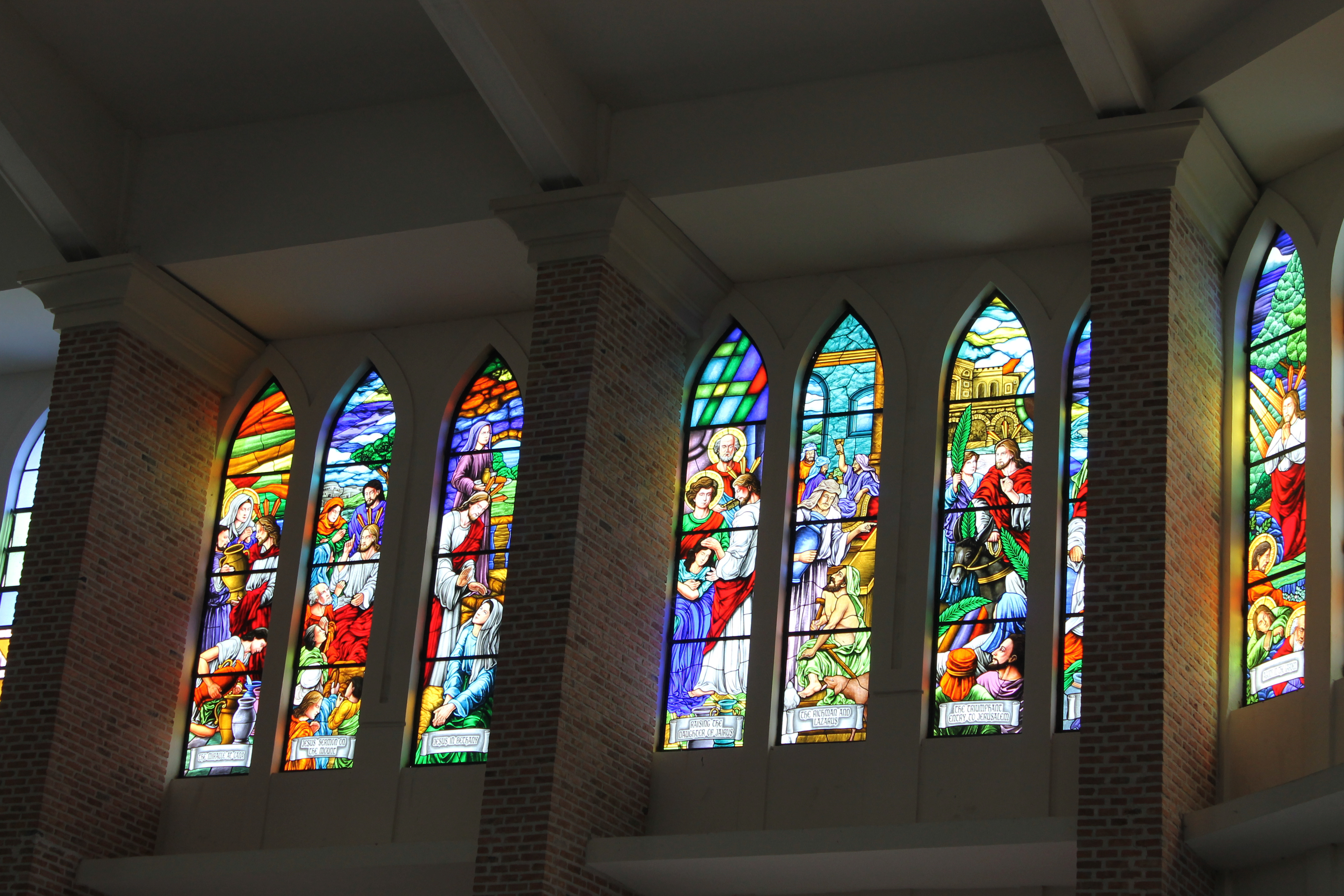
Stained glass windows

== Bibliography ==
- Layug, Benjamin Locsin (2007). A Tourist Guide to Notable Philippine Churches. New Day Publishers. ISBN 978-971-10-1168-0.
- Santos, Almia De Los (November 13, 2010). Journey to the Beginning: A True Story. Xlibris Corporation. ISBN 978-1-4535-3802-9.
