= Girus Tarasii =

Town in Numidia, Ancient Rome

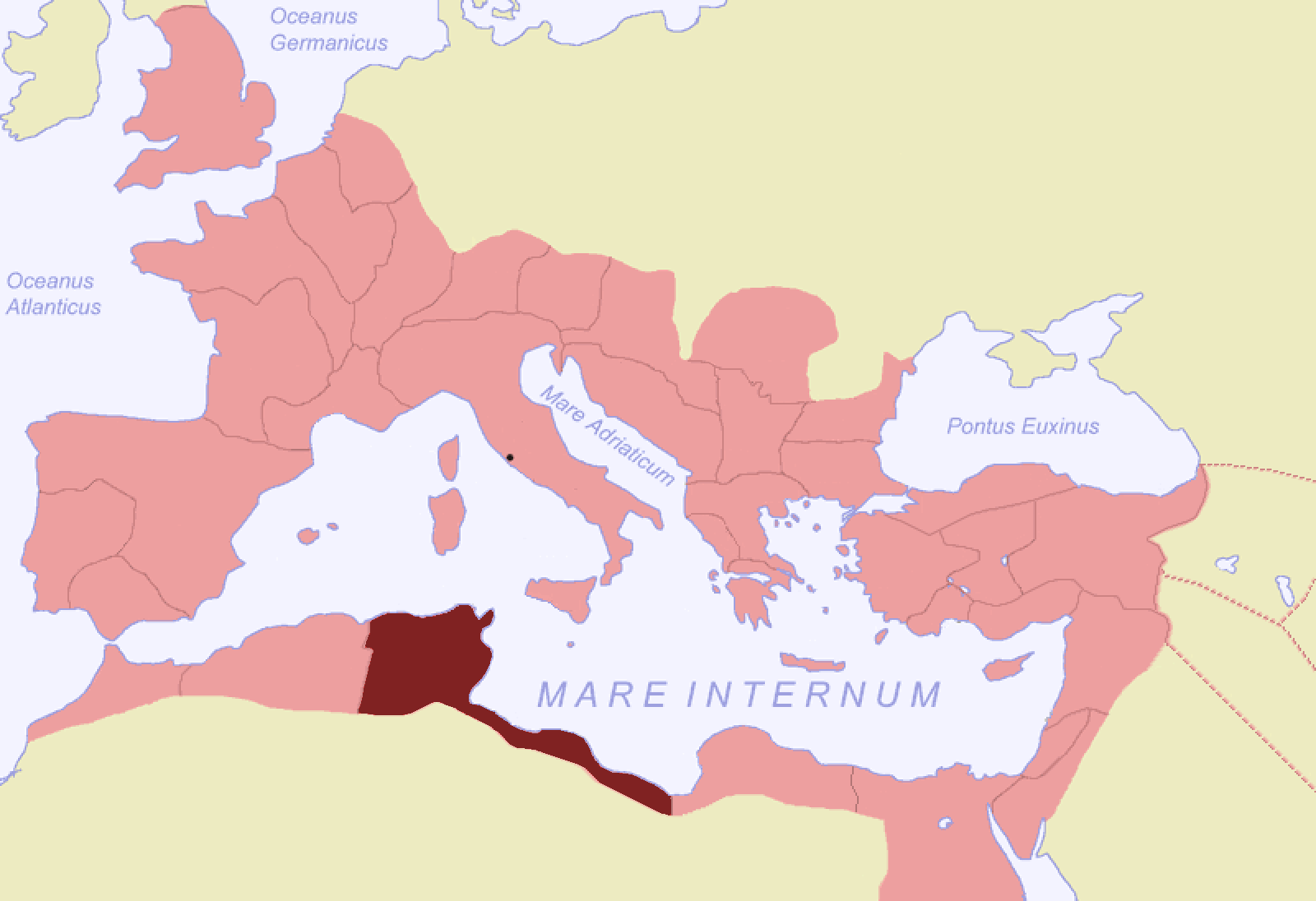
Africa proconsularis SPQR.

Girus Tarasii was a town in the Roman province of Numidia that became a residential episcopal see. It is tentatively identified with ruins situated at what is now called Henchir-Tarsa in Algeria.

Girus Tarasii was probably the seat of an ancient bishopric which survives as a titular see of the Catholic Church, by the name Tarasa in Numidia.

== History ==
=== Bishopric ===
The city was the seat of an ancient bishopric.

Little is known of the bishopric. However, the bishop here, Cresconio, attended the synod in Carthage in 484 called by the Vandal king Huneric after which the bishop was exiled. The city may have been the home of Zosimus, who participated in the Council of Carthage (256) called by Cyprian to discuss the problem of Lapsi, though more likely he was of Tarasa of Byzacena.

- Zosimus? (fl 256)
- Cresconio (fl 484)
- Urbain Etienne Morlion (1939–1959)
- Antonino Pinci (1961–1987)
- Luis del Castillo Estrada (1988–1999)
- Artur Grzegorz Mizinski, from 3 May 2004

The bishopric ceased to effectively function with the Muslim conquest of the Maghreb but was re-founded in name in the early 20th century and remains as a titular bishopric. The current bishop is Artur Grzegorz Miziński of Poland.

== See also ==
- List of Catholic titular sees
