= Salvador Lazo =

Filipino traditionalist Catholic bishop

His Excellency, The Most Reverend Salvador Lazo D.D.
- Bishop Emeritus of San Fernando de La Union
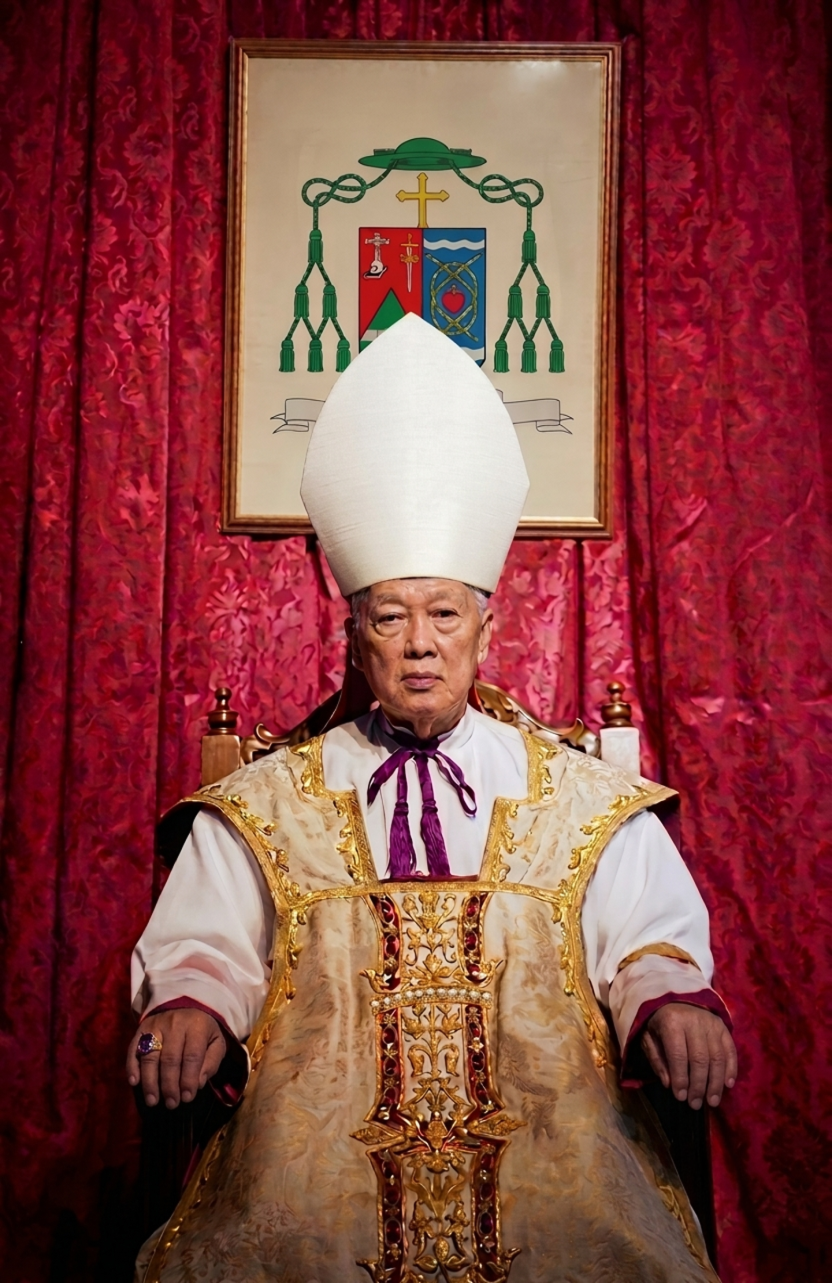
- Bishop Salvador Lazo, circa 1995
- Church: Catholic Church
- Province: Nueva Segovia
- See: San Fernando de La Union
- Appointed: 20 January 1981
- Installed: 9 March 1981
- Term ended: 28 May 1993
- Predecessor: Victorino Ligot
- Successor: Antonio Tobias
- Other post: Bishop of San Fernando de La Union (1981–1993)
- Previous posts: Auxiliary Bishop of Nueva Segovia (1977–1981); Auxiliary Bishop of Tuguegarao (1969–1977); Titular Bishop of Selia (1969–1970)

Orders
- Ordination: 22 March 1947 by Mariano Madriaga
- Consecration: 3 February 1970 by Carmine Rocco, Juan Sison and Teodulfo Domingo

Personal details
- Born: Salvador Lazo Lazo; 1 May 1918 Faire, Cagayan, Insular Government of the Philippine Islands, United States
- Died: 11 April 2000 (aged 81) Manila, Philippines
- Buried: Church of Our Lady of Victories, Quezon City, Philippines
- Denomination: Roman Catholic
- Parents: Fortunato Lazo (Father); Emiliana Lazo (Mother)
- Education: Immaculate Conception Seminary, Vigan, Ilocos Sur; Christ the King Mission Seminary, Quezon City; Cagayan National High School, Tuguegarao, Cagayan
- Motto: Servire (To serve)
- Signature: Salvador Lazo's signature

Ordination history
History
Priestly ordination
- Ordained by: Mariano Madriaga
Episcopal consecration
- Principal consecrator: Carmine Rocco
- Co-consecrators: Juan Sison; Teodulfo Domingo
- Styles
- Reference style: His Excellency; The Most Reverend
- Spoken style: Your Excellency
- Religious style: Bishop

Salvador Lazo y Lazo (May 1, 1918 – April 11, 2000) was a Filipino prelate of the Roman Catholic Church. A Traditionalist Catholic, he served as Bishop of San Fernando de La Union from 1981 to 1993, later on his life he joined the Society of Saint Pius X, making him the only Filipino bishop to join to Catholic traditionalism in the post-Vatican II era.

== Early life ==
One of seven children, Lazo was born in Faire (present-day Santo Niño), Cagayan, to Fortunato and Emiliana Lazo. His father was the local Justice of the Peace. Following his mother's death during childbirth in 1926, his aunt helped raise the family. Lazo graduated from Santo Nino Central School in 1933, and then attended Cagayan National High School and Christ the King Seminary, run by the Divine Word Missionaries. During the Japanese occupation of World War II, he and his fellow novices were forced to continue their studies at Immaculate Conception Seminary in Vigan City. His brother, also a seminarian, was killed during this time.

== Priesthood ==
Leaving the Divine Word Missionaries to serve the Diocese of Tuguegarao, Lazo was ordained to the priesthood by Archbishop Mariano Madriaga on March 22, 1947. He then served as an assistant priest at St. Peter's Cathedral in Vigan, and later at San Jose parish in Baggao. He also founded San Jose Academy. In 1950, Lazo was named prefect of discipline at the newly created San Jacinto Minor Seminary, of which he later became rector in 1951.

He became parish priest of Lal-Lo in 1967 and, due to the large number of students, founded the Lyceum of Lal-Lo in 1968.

== Episcopal career ==
On December 1, 1969, Lazo was appointed Auxiliary Bishop of Tuguegarao and Titular Bishop of Selia by Pope Paul VI. He received his episcopal consecration on February 3, 1970 from Archbishop Carmine Rocco, with Archbishops Juan Sison and Teodulfo Domingo serving as co-consecrators. Following the death of Antonio Buenafe, he was named Auxiliary Bishop of Nueva Segovia on August 3, 1977.

On January 20, 1981, Lazo was appointed the second Bishop of San Fernando de La Union by Pope John Paul II; he was formally installed as Bishop on the following March 9. During his tenure, Lazo oversaw the construction of a seminary, chancery, episcopal residence, two convents, and St. Joseph Pastoral Center. The 1990 Luzon earthquake greatly damaged several churches, schools, and rectories in the Diocese.

== Later life ==
Upon reaching the mandatory retirement age of 75, Lazo resigned his post as Bishop on May 28, 1993. He then lived with his cancer-stricken sister in Zamboanga City. He then came into contact with the Society of St. Pius X and began to identify himself as a Traditionalist Catholic, exclusively celebrating the Tridentine Mass by 1995. Appeals were made by Cardinal Jaime Sin and Archbishop Diosdado Talamayan for Lazo to discontinue his association with the SSPX, but he refused.

In 1998, he made a Declaration of Faith to John Paul II, saying "obedience must serve faith".

In the same document, Lazo expressed skepticism of the reforms of the Second Vatican Council, saying "If the Conciliar reforms are according to the will of Jesus Christ, then, I will gladly cooperate in their implementation. But if the Conciliar reforms are planned for the destruction of the Catholic Religion founded by Jesus Christ, then, I refuse to give my cooperation."

In his later autobiography however, Lazo viewed the post-Conciliar reforms as "Masonic inspired," and "aimed to destroy the Catholic Religion." Lazo also said that, apart from Satan and Freemasonry, he identified "Talmudic Judaism" as one of the "three enemies of the Catholic Church".

Lazo later died at age 81. His funeral Mass was celebrated by Bishop Bernard Fellay, and he was buried at the Church of Our Lady of Victories in Quezon City.
