= Danilo Ulep =

Roman Catholic Bishop in Philippines

The Most Reverend Juan Danilo B. Ulep
- Bishop-Prelate of Batanes
- Church: Catholic Church
- See: Territorial Prelature of Batanes
- Appointed: May 10, 2017
- Predecessor: Camilo D. Gregorio
- Successor: Incumbent
- Other posts: Chairman, CBCP Episcopal Commission on Cultural Heritage of the Church

Orders
- Ordination: April 10, 1987 by Diosdado Talamayan
- Consecration: July 29, 2017 by Sergio Utleg

Personal details
- Born: June 24, 1962 (age 64) Tuguegarao, Cagayan, Philippines
- Residence: Palacio Nu Obispo; Basco, Batanes 3009
- Occupation: Prelate (bishop)
- Education: University of Santo Tomas; San Jacinto Seminary
- Motto: Fiat voluntas tua ('Your will be done', Matthew 6:10)
- Coat of arms

Juan Danilo Bangayan Ulep (born June 24, 1962) is a Filipino bishop of the Catholic Church. He is the fifth and current Bishop-Prelate of Batanes and was elected as the Chairman of the Episcopal Commission on Cultural Heritage of the Church during the 126th Plenary Assembly of the Catholic Bishops' Conference of the Philippines.

== Biography ==
Ulep was born in Tuguegarao, Cagayan on June 24, 1962. He studied philosophy and theology at the Santo Tomas University in Manila, where he obtained a bachelor's degree in philosophy, theology and canon law, and a licentiate in philosophy.

He was ordained a priest for the Diocese of Tugugarao with Archbishop Ricardo Baccay on 10 April 1987 at the St. Peter's Cathedral by Archbishop Diosdado Talamayan, then Archbishop of Tuguegarao.

He subsequently served as: vicar of the parish of San Vincenzo Ferrer, Solana, Cagayan (1987–1992); administrator of the same parish (1992–1993); pastor of the Holy Guardian Angels parish, Tuao, Cagayan (1993–1999); rector of the San Jacinto minor seminary of Alimannao, Cagayan and director of the commission for vocations and seminaries (1999–2005); pastor of the St. Joseph the Worker parish of San José, Baggao, and episcopal vicar of Alcala (2005–2011).

Finally, from 2011 up to the present, he has served as pastor and rector of the Santo Niño parish and shrine in San Gabriel, Tuguegarao City, Cagayan, director of the biblical apostolate and president of the priests’ assembly of the archdiocese of Tuguegarao.

On May 20, 2017, Pope Francis appointed him as the fifth bishop of the Territorial Prelature of Batanes following the resignation of Bishop Camilo D. Gregorio. He was consecrated bishop at St. Peter's Cathedral on July 29, 2017, by Archbishop Sergio Utleg, then Archbishop of Tuguegarao. Co-consecrators were Archbishop Marlo M. Peralta of Nueva Segovia and Bishop Camilo D. Gregorio, Bishop-Prelate Emeritus of Batanes. He was installed as Bishop-Prelate of Batanes on August 8 of the same year, coinciding with the feast of Saint Dominic De Guzman, patron of Basco, the capital of Batanes.

== Coat of arms ==
The coat of arms of the Prelature of Batanes appears on the left side of the viewer while that of Bishop Ulep appears on the right. Bishop Ulep's motto is taken from Matthew 6:10, Fiat voluntas tua ("Your will be done").

Catholic Church titles
Preceded by Camillo Gregorio	Bishop-Prelate of Batanes; 2017–present	Incumbent
