= Saint Ferdinand Co-Cathedral (Ilagan) =

Roman Catholic church in Isabela, Philippines

Saint Ferdinand Parish Church
- Proto-Cathedral of Ilagan
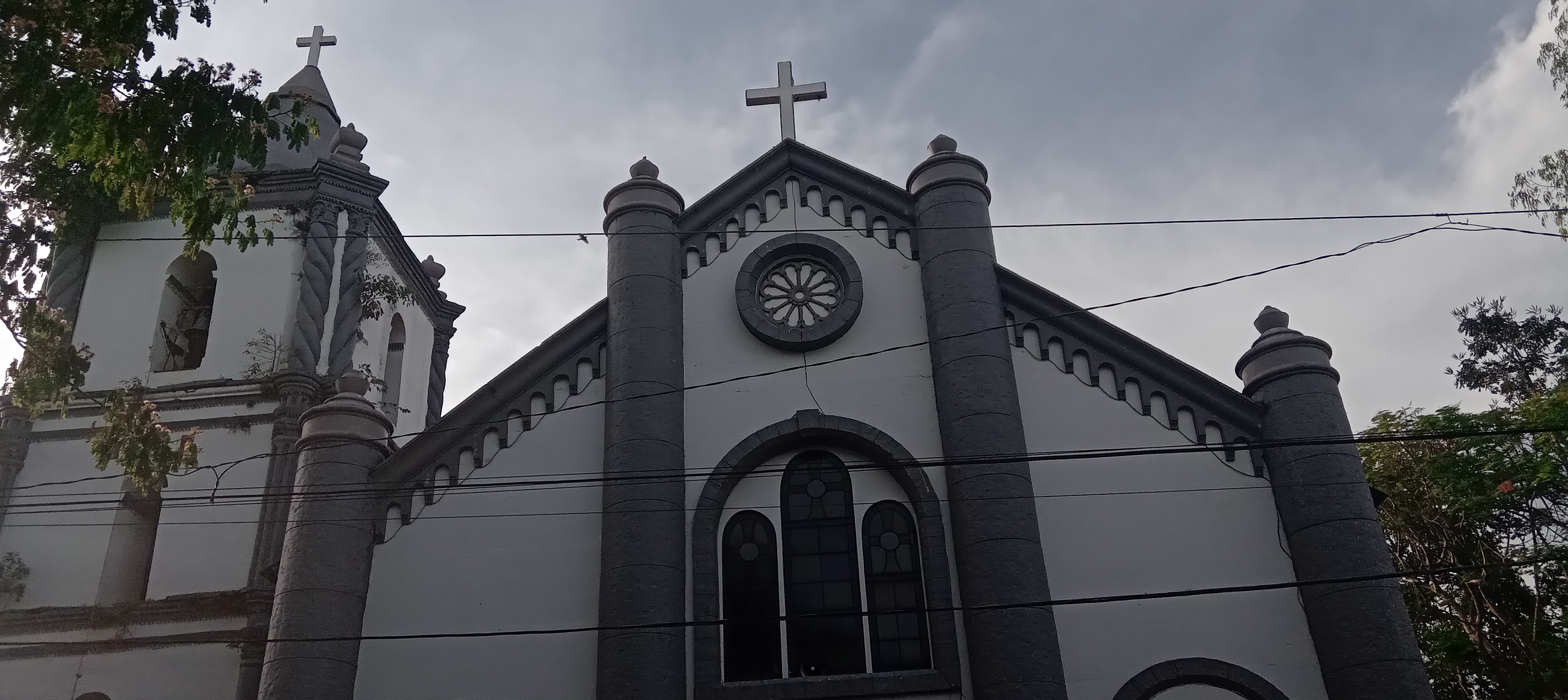
- Cathedral facade in 2022

- Location in Luzon Location in the Philippines
- 17°08′58″N 121°53′21″E
- Location: Ilagan, Isabela
- Country: Philippines
- Denomination: Roman Catholic

History
- Status: Cathedral
- Founded: 1686
- Founder: Pedro Jimenez
- Dedication: Saint Ferdinand of Castile

Architecture
- Functional status: Active
- Architectural type: Church building

Specifications
- Materials: Brick, sand, stone, gravel, cement, steel, concrete

Administration
- Province: Tuguegarao
- Metropolis: Tuguegarao
- Archdiocese: Tuguegarao
- Diocese: Ilagan

Clergy
- Archbishop: Ricardo L. Baccay
- Bishop: David William V. Antonio

Saint Ferdinand Parish Church, also known as the Proto-Cathedral of Ilagan, is a Roman Catholic cathedral located in Barangay Bagumbayan in Ilagan, the capital of the province of Isabela, Philippines. The cathedral used to be the episcopal seat of the Diocese of Ilagan until it was transferred to the Cathedral of Saint Michael the Archangel in the neighboring town of Gamu in 2003.

== History ==
Ilagan had its beginnings as an encomienda of Don Hernandez de Paz circa 1617. The town was also founded as a mission of the Dominican priests called San Miguel de Bolo on April 21, 1619. After the revolt in 1621 by the inhabitants of Ilagan and the nearby towns of Naguilian and Baculud, nothing was written about the town's history until it was re-founded by Pedro Jimenez in 1678. During that time, it was officially named as San Fernando de Ilagan. It was also formally accepted as a Dominican mission in March 1686.

At around noontime on April 22, 2024, the church was struck by an hour-long fire that occurred during renovations on its roof, destroying its interior and causing a large portion of the roof to collapse. One person was injured after coming into contact with superheated metal while salvaging items from the cathedral. Several religious images were rescued from the church.

== Architectural history ==
Records tell that the construction of the church of Ilagan started around 1696 to 1700. In 1777, Pedro de San Pedro started the construction of the belfry. Later on, the tower was completed by Joaquin Sancho in 1783, the date indicated in the clay inset found at the top of the tower. The church was recorded to have sustained heavy damages during a typhoon in 1866. It was torn down by the parish priest in the hopes of erecting a new structure. The current church structure is no longer the old stone structure erected in the Spanish-era. Only the tower remains intact.

== Transfer ==
The cathedral served as the episcopal seat the Roman Catholic Diocese of Ilagan since its establishment in 1970 until 2003, when it was transferred to the newer Saint Ferdinand Cathedral in Barangay Upi, Gamu. In 2013, Pope Francis decreed that the new cathedral be dedicated to Saint Michael the Archangel although the diocese remains under the patronage of Saint Ferdinand of Castile.
