= Gamu Cathedral =

Roman Catholic church in Isabela, Philippines

St. Michael Cathedral
- Cathedral of Saint Michael the Archangel
- Katedral ni San Miguel Arkangel (Filipino); Catedral de San Miguel Arcángel (Spanish)
- Cathedral facade in 2026

- Location in Luzon Location in the Philippines
- 17°05′16″N 121°51′16″E
- Location: Gamu, Isabela
- Country: Philippines
- Denomination: Roman Catholic

History
- Former name: Saint Ferdinand Cathedral
- Status: Cathedral
- Founded: 1686, 2013
- Founder: Pedro Jimenez
- Dedication: Saint Michael the Archangel

Architecture
- Functional status: Active
- Architectural type: Church building

Specifications
- Materials: Brick, sand, stone, gravel, cement, steel, concrete

Administration
- Province: Tuguegarao
- Metropolis: Tuguegarao
- Archdiocese: Tuguegarao
- Diocese: Ilagan

Clergy
- Archbishop: Ricardo L. Baccay
- Bishop: David William V. Antonio

The Cathedral of Saint Michael the Archangel, also known as Saint Michael Cathedral and formerly known as Saint Ferdinand Cathedral, is a Roman Catholic cathedral located in the town of Gamu, in the province of Isabela, Philippines. Before the cathedral was built, the former seat of the Roman Catholic Diocese of Ilagan was located in Saint Ferdinand Proto-Cathedral in Barangay Bagumbayan, Ilagan, Isabela.

== Old Saint Ferdinand Cathedral ==
=== History ===
Ilagan had its beginnings as an encomienda of Don Hernández de Paz circa 1617. The town was also founded as a mission of the Dominican priests called San Miguel de Bolo on April 21, 1619. After the revolt in 1621 by the inhabitants of Ilagan and the nearby towns of Naguilian and Baculud, nothing was written about the town’s history until it was re-founded by Pedro Jimenez in 1678. During that time, it was officially named as San Fernando de Ilagan. It was also formally accepted as a Dominican mission in March 1686.

=== Architectural history ===
Records tell that the construction of the church of Ilagan started around 1696 to 1700. In 1777, Pedro de San Pedro started the construction of the belfry. Later on, the tower was completed by Joaquin Sancho in 1783, the date indicated in the clay inset found at the top of the tower. The church was recorded to have sustained heavy damages during a typhoon in 1866. It was torn down by the parish priest in the hopes of erecting a new structure. The current church structure is no longer the old stone structure erected in the Spanish-era. Only the tower remains intact. On April 22, 2024, a fire started from the roof of the 300-year old church which destroyed most of its interior.

== New Gamu Cathedral ==
The current cathedral was built in 2000. In 2003, the episcopal seat of the Roman Catholic Diocese of Ilagan was transferred from the Saint Ferdinand Parish Church to a new Church in Barangay Upi, in the town of Gamu. In 2013, Pope Francis decreed that the cathedral be dedicated to Saint Michael the Archangel although the diocese remains under the patronage of Saint Ferdinand of Castile.
