= Constant Jurgens =

Dutch prelate of the Catholic Church (1879–1952)

The Most Reverend Constant J. Jurgens C.I.C.M., D.D.
- Bishop of Tuguegarao
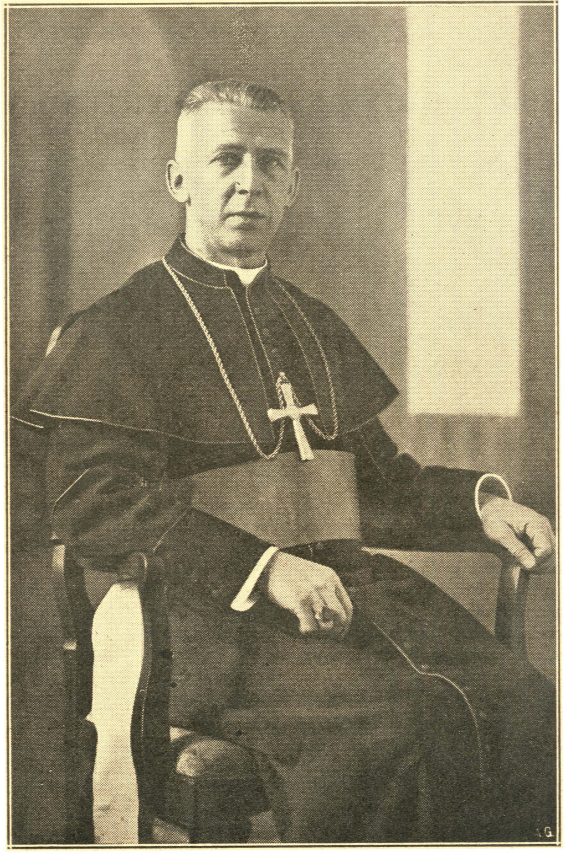
- Official Portrait of Bishop Jurgens, 1930
- Church: Catholic
- Diocese: Tuguegarao
- Appointed: 27 Jan 1928
- Term ended: 6 May 1950
- Predecessor: Santiago Caragnan Sancho
- Successor: Alejandro Ayson Olalia
- Other posts: Bishop-prelate of the Los Baños Internment Camp (1944-1945); Bishop Emeritus of Tuguegarao (1950–1952); Titular Bishop of Acarassus (1950–1952)

Personal details
- Born: 12 December 1879 Oss, Netherlands
- Died: 3 June 1952 (aged 72) Quezon City, Philippines
- Buried: Tuguegarao Cathedral
- Motto: Ad Iesum Eucharisticum per Mariam (To the Eucharistic Jesus through Mary)
- Coat of arms: Constant J. Jurgens's coat of arms

Ordination history
History
Episcopal consecration
- Principal consecrator: Arnold Frans Diepen
- Co-consecrators: Pieter Adriaan Willem Hopmans, Gilles de Böck
Episcopal succession
Bishops consecrated by Constant Jurgens as principal consecrator
- Alejandro Ayson Olalia: 25 July 1949

Styles of Constant J. Jurgens
- Reference style: The Most Reverend
- Spoken style: Your Excellency
- Religious style: Bishop

Constant (Constancio) Jurgens, C.I.C.M., D.D. (12 December 1879 – 3 June 1952), was a Dutch CICM Missionary and an educator who served as the third Bishop of Tuguegarao.

== Early life and education ==
Jurgens was born on December 12, 1879 at Oss, province of North Braband, the Netherlands. Coming from an affluent family, his parents were owners of butter and cheese factories in Europe, which eventually became part of Unilever. He eventually entered the Haaren Seminary and was ordained to the priesthood in 1905. Afterwards he joined the Congregation of the Immaculate Heart of Mary.

== Pastoral ministry ==
In 1907, Jurgens, together with Fathers Pieter Dierickx, Florimund Carlu, Albert Dereume, Seraphin Devesse, Christian Hulsboch, Jules Sepulchre, Oktaaf Vandewalle, and Henri Verbeeck, became one of the first CICM missionaries sent to the Philippines. They were assigned in the Cordillera mountains, where they handled the Catholic evangelization of the region.

Based in Bontoc, Jurgens emphasized catechism to the indigenous locals. At his own expense, he rebuilt the old Spanish church and convent of Bontoc and organized there a school and a boy's dormitory. He also formed a school for girls under the care of the Belgian sisters. Jurgens sent his most promising students in Manila for further education, and enabled the Belgian sisters to teach lace-making and weaving to the local women. After a trip in Japan, he tried to introduce the silk industry in Mountain Province. He also built cottages for their students who married each other in order to raise their standards of living.

In 1918, Jurgens was transferred to Bayombong, Nueva Vizcaya. Similar to what he did in Bontoc, using his own money, he rebuilt the Bayombong Church a clubhouse for the parish community. With his emphasis in catechism, he translated the prayer book My Companion to Gaddang language and used color slides in explaining the Catholic faith to the residents.

In 1926, he returned to Holland as rector at the seminary of Nymegen until his appointment to the episcopate.

== Episcopate ==
In 1928, Jurgens was appointed by Pope Pius XI as Bishop of Tuguegarao. He was consecrated bishop by Bishop Arnold Frans Diepen of Hertogenbosch, together with Bishops Pieter Adriaan Willem Hopmans and Gilles de Boeck as co-consecrators. Bishop Jurgens' coat of arms bears the motto "Latin: Ad Jesum Eucharisticum per Mariam" which translates into "To the Eucharistic Jesus though Mary".

As bishop, Jurgens conducted formation for their catechists inside his episcopal residence, and published catechetical materials for children. In exchange for his help in financing the construction of the Christ the King Mission Seminary, in 1933, the Society of the Divine Word accepted his request to assist in the pastoral care of his diocese. He also convoked the Third Diocesan Catholic Synod in 1935 to discuss matters concerning their pastoral governance.

Although he had to close their San Jacinto Seminary in 1932 due to lack of funding, he was able to open the Cagayan Valley Atheneum, an all-boys school in Tuguegarao, in 1938. After the war, the school was managed by the Jesuits and converted it as Ateneo de Tuguegarao, until its closure in 1962.

During World War II, Jurgens was among the clergy who were interned at the Los Baños Internment Camp. He lived together with the other religious who were sent in the camp as civilian internees. Apostolic Delegate Guglielmo Piani then formed the Prelature Nullius Los Baños Internment Camp to accommodate the spiritual needs of the interned clergy and civilian faithful. He was appointed as its Bishop-prelate.

After the war, he led the reconstruction of Catholic-owned structures damaged by World War II.. In 1948, he invited the La Salette Missionaries to minister in Isabela due to the lack of priests in the said province.

== Retirement and death ==
His imprisonment during the war took a toll on his health. In 1950, he resigned from his episcopal see and was appointed as Titular Bishop of Acarassus. He then lived at the CICM Procuration House in Quezon City until his death on June 3, 1952. His body was transported back to Tuguegarao, and was buried at the Tuguegarao Cathedral.

Catholic Church titles
| Preceded by Santiago Sancho | Bishop of Tuguegarao; 1928–1950 | Succeeded by Alejandro Olalia |
| Preceded by Louis Janssens | Titular Bishop of Acarassus; 1950–1952 | Succeeded by Paul Constant Schoenmaekers |
