= Joseph Nacua =

Filipino Roman Catholic prelate (1945–2022)

The Most Reverend Joseph Nacua, OFMCap, D.D.
- Bishop of Ilagan
- Archdiocese: Tuguegarao
- Appointed: June 10, 2008
- Term ended: February 25, 2017
- Predecessor: Sergio Lasam Utleg
- Successor: David William Valencia Antonio

Orders
- Ordination: June 26, 1971
- Consecration: August 19, 2008 by Diosdado Aenlle Talamayan

Personal details
- Born: Joseph Benedict Amangi Nacua; January 5, 1945 Mankayan, Mountain Province, Philippines
- Died: September 10, 2022 (aged 77) Lipa, Batangas, Philippines
- Motto: RECORCATUS MISERICORDIAE SUAE
- Coat of arms

Styles of Joseph Nacua
- Reference style: His Excellency; The Most Reverend
- Spoken style: Your Excellency
- Religious style: Bishop

Joseph Benedict Amangi Nacua, OFMCap (January 5, 1945 – September 10, 2022) was a Filipino Roman Catholic prelate. Nacua was born in the Philippines and was ordained to the priesthood in 1971. He served as the bishop of the Roman Catholic Diocese of Ilagan, Philippines from 2008 until his resignation in 2017.

Nacua is the first Filipino clergyman from the Capuchins to get ordained to the episcopate.

Nacua died on September 10, 2022, while confined in a hospital in Lipa, Batangas.

Catholic Church titles
Preceded by Sergio Lasam Utleg	Bishop of Ilagan; 2008–2017	Succeeded by David William Valencia Antonio
