= Cagayan Heritage Conservation Society =

Non-governmental organization

- Abbreviation: CHCS
- Formation: 2018
- Founded at: Tuguegarao City, Philippines
- Type: NGO
- Purpose: Heritage conservation

The Cagayan Heritage Conservation Society is a nonprofit organization aimed at spreading awareness about Cagayan's history and culture through education & research, training, and policy reform. It was founded in 2018.

With members in their mid-20s, they help in preserving further Cagayanos’ languages and culture.

== Programs and activities ==
=== Heritage walks ===
By the help of Cagayan Museum and Historical Research Center, the society is known for their heritage walks around Cagayan Valley dubbed as Manalan Tera. The society's pioneers gives the lectures during the tour on old sites starting from Tribunal de Tuguegarao (Old Provincial Jail, now Cagayan Museum's new location), Rizal Park, Tuguegarao Metropolitan Cathedral, Ermita de San Jacinto, and ends in Horno Ruins, Bagumbayan, Tuguegarao City. The organization have been promoting all of these sites as heritage zones.

=== Heritage activities ===
One of their activities, Minas anna Zininagâ, stages budding local poets, composers, and musicians. They also hold talks and seminars, dubbed as Y Zininaga Tam (literally "The Heritage" in Ibanag language).

== See also ==
- Cagayan Valley
- Cagayan Province
