= Diosdado Talamayan =

Filipino prelate of the Catholic Church (born 1932)

The Most Reverend Diosdado A. Talamayan D.D., Ph.D., S.T.D.
- Archbishop Emeritus of Tuguegarao
- Church: Catholic
- Archdiocese: Tuguegarao
- Appointed: January 31, 1986
- Installed: April 10, 1986
- Retired: June 15, 2011
- Predecessor: Teodulfo Domingo
- Successor: Sergio Utleg
- Previous posts: North Luzon Regional Representative, CBCP Permanent Council (2001–2005); Chairman, CBCP Commission on Health Care (1986–1999); Auxiliary Bishop of Tuguegarao and Titular Bishop of Girus (1983–1986)

Orders
- Ordination: November 30, 1956
- Consecration: January 12, 1984 by Bruno Torpigliani

Personal details
- Born: October 19, 1932 (age 94) Manila, Philippine Islands
- Education: University of Santo Tomas; Institute Catholique; Pontifical University of Salamanca; Columbia University; De La Salle University
- Motto: In aedificationem corporis Christi ('For building up the body of Christ', Ephesians 4:12)
- Coat of arms: Diosdado A. Talamayan's coat of arms

Ordination history
History
Episcopal consecration
- Principal consecrator: Bruno Torpigliani
- Co-consecrators: Teodulfo Domingo; Miguel Purugganan
Episcopal succession
Bishops consecrated by Diosdado Talamayan as principal consecrator
- Rodolfo Fontiveros Beltran: 16 May 2006
- Joseph Amangi Nacua: 19 August 2008
- Styles
- Reference style: The Most Reverend
- Spoken style: Your Excellency
- Religious style: Archbishop

Diosdado Aenlle Talamayan, D.D., Ph.D., S.T.D. (born October 19, 1932) is a Filipino prelate of the Catholic Church. He served as the archbishop of the Archdiocese of Tuguegarao in the province of Cagayan, on the island of Luzon, Philippines from 1986 until his retirement in 2011. In retirement, Talamayan is archbishop emeritus of Tuguegarao.

== Early life and studies ==
Diosdado Aenlle Talamayan was born on October 19, 1932. He graduated from the Pontifical and Royal University of Sto Tomas, Manila in 1953. He received his Diploma in French Language and Civilization at the Institute Catholique in France in 1960. He then studied at the Pontifical University of Salamanca, Spain until 1961. He received his Doctor of Philosophy at the Universidad Central de Madrid, Spain in 1962. He received his MA in Teacher Education in 1970 at Columbia University. He also had his Diploma in Thesis Advising from the De La Salle University, Manila in 1979. He is fluent in speaking his Tagalog, as well as the English, Spanish and French languages.

== Ministry ==
Talamayan was ordained priest on November 30, 1956, in Manila, the Philippines. He was an instructor at the San Jacinto Seminary in Alimanao, Peñablanca, Cagayan from 1957 to 1959. He then became the President of Lyceum of Aparri from 1967 to 1968. He became the Vicar Forane of Aparri, Cagayan from 1971 to 1986. He was appointed an auxiliary bishop of Tuguegarao and Titular Bishop of Girus on October 20, 1983. On January 12, 1984, He was consecrated bishop by then Apostolic Nuncio to the Philippines, Archbishop Bruno Torpigliani at the Saint Peter Metropolitan Cathedral. Later, he was appointed as the second Archbishop of Tuguegarao on January 31, 1986, succeeding Archbishop Teodulfo Domingo.

Before his episcopal ordination, Talamayan founded on February 11, 1967, the Lyceum of Aparri, the mother school of the Archdiocese of Tuguegarao and the Thomas Aquinas Major Seminary (TAMS). In the field of culture and heritage, he established the Cagayan Ecclesiastical Museum which is located within the Lyceum of Aparri campus in 1967. He also founded the Our Lady of Piat Museum at the Minor Basilica of Our Lady of Piat. During his episcopacy, a more permanent structure for the Archdiocesan Archives was built and inaugurated. All these while tirelessly working to preserve and promote Cagayan culture and heritage. Archbishop Talamayan also founded the order of Eucharistic Healers of Mary whose charism was to take care of sick and elderly priests. Fr. Lorenzo Marzo is the first ordained priest.

Talamayan was the chairman of the Commission on Health Care of the Catholic Bishops' Conference of the Philippines (CBCP) from 1986-1999.

During Talamayan's 75th birthday on October 19, Philippine President Gloria Arroyo inaugurated the carillon bells at the Santo Nino Parish and Shrine in Tuguegarao, an added attraction in the region being the first and only bell system in Cagayan Valley. The birthday celebration also marked the end of his tenure as pastor of the entire archdiocese, with the dioceses of Ilagan and Bayombong covering the provinces of Isabela, Nueva Vizcaya and Quirino, respectively.

== See also ==
- List of Catholic bishops in the Philippines

Catholic Church titles
Preceded by Teodulfo Sabugal Domingo	Archbishop of Tuguegarao; 10 April 1986 – 15 June 2011	Succeeded by Sergio Utleg
