= Sergio Utleg =

Roman Catholic archbishop-emeritus

The Most Reverend Sergio Utleg
- Archbishop Emeritus of Tuguegarao
- Native name: Ama Enjo Utleg
- See: Tuguegarao
- Installed: June 15, 2011
- Term ended: October 18, 2019
- Predecessor: Diosdado Talamayan
- Successor: Ricardo Baccay
- Previous posts: Metropolitan Archbishop of Tuguegarao (2011-2019); Chairman, CBCP Episcopal Commission on Indigenous Peoples (2005-2013); North Luzon Regional Representative, CBCP Permanent Council (2011-2013); Bishop of Laoag (2006-2011); Bishop of Ilagan (1999-2006); Coadjutor Bishop of Ilagan (1997-1999)

Orders
- Ordination: 30 March 1968
- Consecration: 17 March 1997 by Gian Vincenzo Moreni

Personal details
- Born: September 11, 1943 (age 83) Solana, Cagayan
- Denomination: Roman Catholic
- Education: San Jacinto Seminary; University of Santo Tomas; Gregorian University; Fordham University
- Motto: Veritas liberabit vos ('The truth will set you free', John 8:32)
- Coat of arms: Sergio Utleg's coat of arms

Styles of Sergio Lasam Utleg
- Reference style: The Most Reverend
- Spoken style: Your Excellency
- Religious style: Archbishop

Sergio Lasam Utleg (born in Solana, Cagayan, September 11, 1943), is a prelate of the Roman Catholic Church in the Philippines. He is the former Archbishop of Tuguegarao in Tuguegarao, Philippines. On October 18, 2019, his resignation was accepted by Pope Francis, appointing Alaminos Bishop Ricardo Baccay as his successor.

Ordination history of Sergio Utleg
History
Episcopal consecration
- Principal consecrator: Most Rev. Gian Vincenzo Moreni, D.D.
- Co-consecrators: Most Rev. Diosdado Aenlle Talamayan, D.D. Most Rev. Miguel Gatan Purugganan, D.D.
Episcopal succession
Bishops consecrated by Sergio Utleg as principal consecrator
- Most Rev. Danilo Bangayan Ulep, D.D.: 29 July 2017

== Life and church ==
Sergio Lasam Utleg or fondly called as "Ama Enjoe" was born 11 September 1943 in Solana, Cagayan (Philippines). He received his Philosophical and Theological Studies at the UST Central Seminary in Manila. He then obtained a MA in Sociology at the Fordham University in New York, USA in 1967 and a licentiate in theology at the Pontifical Gregorian University in Rome in 1968.

He was ordained a priest in New York, USA for then Diocese of Tuguegarao on 30 March 1968. After a few years of being a parochial vicar, he became parish priest in Cordova, Amulung from 1973 to 1987 and then, parish priest in Alcala, Cagayan until 1997. At the same time, he held positions in the office for the social pastoral care of the Archdiocese of Tuguegarao.

He was elected Coadjutor Bishop of Ilagan on 10 February 1997 by Pope John Paul II. His Episcopal Consecration was on March 17, 1997 at St. Peter's Cathedral, Tuguegarao. He then succeeded as Bishop of Ilagan on July 26, 1999 following the acceptance of the resignation of his predecessor, The Most Rev. Miguel Purugganan. Then-Bishop Utleg was appointed by Pope Benedict XVI as Bishop of Laoag on November 13, 2006 and installed as Bishop of Laoag on January 11, 2007.

Within the Episcopal Conference of the Philippines, he became President of the "Episcopal Commission on Indigenous Peoples".

== Archbishop of Tuguegarao ==
On June 16, 2011, Pope Benedict XVI has elevated Laoag Bishop Sergio Utleg to Archbishop of Tuguegarao replacing retiring Archbishop Diosdado Talamayan. His resignation was accepted by Pope Francis on October 18, 2019, appointing Alaminos Bishop Ricardo Baccay as his successor as Archbishop of Tuguegarao.

== Coat of Arms ==
Lifted from the Souvenir Program “ The Rite of Liturgical Reception, Eucharistic Celebration and Canonical Possession of the Archdiocese of Tuguegarao”

His Excellency The Most Reverend Sergio Lasam Utleg, D.D., Third Metropolitan Archbishop of Tuguegarao August 12, 2011. Saint Peter Cathedral, Tuguegarao City.

The two sides of the coat of arms are divided in the middle by blue wavy lines. The right side is the personal seal of the Archbishop. The left side is the seal of the Archdiocese of Tuguegarao.

Coat of arms of Sergio Utleg
| Adopted 2011 Helm Archbishop's Galero; The shield is surmounted by an archbishop's galero or ecclesiastical hat of this rank with ten tassels for each side in Vert (green) that signifies the rank of an Archbishop. Motto Veritas liberabit vos "The truth will set you free" the motto is taken from John 8:31. Other elements Archbishop's Cross; The shield is also surmounted by an archbishop's cross of the Order of Preachers. A reminder of the priestly formation he received from the Dominican sisters of Saint Vincent Institute in Solana and the University of Santo Tomas Central Seminary in Manila. Symbolism The blue wavy lines, a symbol present in both the seal of the Archbishop and the Archdiocese, stand for the great Cagayan River on whose banks the Archbishop grew up and worked, which empties into the Babuyan Channel near Aparri, his last parish assignment. The fleur-de-lys in its center represents Our Lady of Piat. On the upper right side is a white dove on a gold background symbolizing the Spirit of freedom; gold stands for mobility and power, white for purity and humility; both are Papal colors. On a green background, emblazoned in red are the Greek letters Alpha and Omega. They stand for the ever-burning Truth; the Green background is the symbol of life of hope. On the lower right stand three ears of corn. They represent three important places in the life and ministry of the Archbishop, the towns of Solana and Alcala, his birthplace and his parish assignment, respectively; and the province of Isabela, the territorial jurisdiction of the Diocese of Ilagan, where his first assignment as a bishop was. In these places, corn is one of their main produce. The left side of the shield is dominated with green. This represents the wide fertile land of the Province of Cagayan. On the upper left side are two keys de-bruising a Latin cross with its head downwards. These are symbols of Saint Peter, titular of the cathedral. Tuguegarao, the seat of the Archdiocese, etymologically means “fire at daytime” (tuguig arao) hence the sun at its side and the symbols of fire at the middle left. On the lower left are mountains drawn in the Italian heraldic style symbolizing the high mountain ranges of Sierra Madre and Cordillera that surrounds the province of Cagayan. Previous versions as Bishop of Ilagan and Laoag |

Catholic Church titles
| Preceded by Miguel Purugganan | Bishop of Ilagan; 1999–2006 | Succeeded by Joseph Amangi Nacua |
| Preceded by Ernesto Antolin Salgado | Bishop of Laoag; 2006–2011 | Succeeded by Renato Pine Mayugba |
| Preceded by Diosdado Talamayan | Archbishop of Tuguegarao; 2011–2019 | Succeeded by Ricardo Baccay |
