= Marlo Peralta =

Filipino Catholic prelate (born 1950)

His Excellency, The Most Reverend Marlo Mendoza Peralta D.D.
- Metropolitan Archbishop Emeritus of Nueva Segovia
- See: Nueva Segovia
- Appointed: December 30, 2013
- Installed: April 2, 2014
- Retired: January 14, 2026
- Predecessor: Ernesto Salgado
- Successor: David William Antonio
- Previous post: Bishop of Alaminos (2007–2013)

Orders
- Ordination: March 31, 1975 by Federico Limon, SVD
- Consecration: March 31, 2006 by Ricardo Vidal

Personal details
- Born: Marlo Mendoza Peralta; July 13, 1950 (age 75) San Carlos, Pangasinan, Philippines
- Motto: Pax hominibus (Latin for 'Peace Among Men of Good Will' – Luke 2:9–11, 13–14)
- Coat of arms

Styles of Marlo Mendoza Peralta
- Reference style: The Most Reverend
- Spoken style: Your Excellency
- Religious style: Archbishop

Marlo Mendoza Peralta (born July 13, 1950, in San Carlos, Pangasinan), is a prelate of the Roman Catholic Church in the Philippines. He is the Metropolitan Archbishop emeritus of Nueva Segovia in the Philippines (2014-2026).

== Career ==
Marlo Mendoza Peralta was ordained priest of Urdaneta, Pangasinan, Philippines on March 31, 1975. He was consecrated bishop on March 31, 2006. He then succeeded as Bishop of Alaminos on July 1, 2007, to 2014.

== Archbishop of Nueva Segovia ==
On December 30, 2013, Pope Francis appointed Peralta to Archbishop of Nueva Segovia replacing Archbishop Ernesto Salgado who was retired on April 2, 2014 upon Peralta's installation.

Pope Leo XIV accepted his resignation on November 4, 2025 that was effective on January 14, 2026 upon the installation of David William Antonio, Bishop of Ilagan, as his successor.

Catholic Church titles
Preceded by Ernesto Salgado	Archbishop of Nueva Segovia; April 2, 2014 – January 14, 2026	Succeeded by David William Antonio
Preceded by Ernesto Salgado	Bishop of Alaminos; July 1, 2007 – April 2, 2014 (Coadjutor: March 31, 2006 – July 1, 2007)	Succeeded by Ricardo Baccay
