= Teodulfo Domingo =

Filipino prelate of the Catholic Church (1910–2002)

The Most Reverend Teodulfo Sabugal Domingo D.D.
- Archbishop of Tuguegarao
- Church: Catholic
- Archdiocese: Tuguegarao, Philippines
- Appointed: April 29, 1957
- Term ended: January 31, 1986
- Predecessor: Alejandro Olalia
- Successor: Diosdado Talamayan
- Other post: Archbishop Emeritus of Tuguegarao (1986–2002)

Orders
- Ordination: April 3, 1938 by Constant Jurgens
- Consecration: July 2, 1957 by Egidio Vagnozzi

Personal details
- Born: 5 September 1910 San Jose, Baggao, Cagayan
- Died: 3 June 2002 (aged 91)
- Motto: Ad Nutum Reginae (At the Pleasure of the Queen)
- Coat of arms: Teodulfo Sabugal Domingo's coat of arms

Ordination history
History
Episcopal consecration
- Principal consecrator: Egidio Vagnozzi
- Co-consecrators: Alejandro Ayson Olalia, Peregrin de la Fuente Néstar

Teodulfo Sabugal Domingo (September 5, 1910 - June 3, 2002) was a Filipino prelate of the Catholic Church in the Philippines. He was the fifth Bishop of Tuguegarao and first Archbishop of Tuguegarao when then diocese of Tuguegarao was elevated as an archdiocese by Pope Paul VI in September 21, 1974. He was the first Cagayano to be consecrated as bishop and the longest serving ordinary of Tuguegarao to date.

== Biography ==
Archbishop Teodulfo S. Domingo was born in San Jose, Baggao, Cagayan on September 5, 1910. For his priestly formation, he first studied at the San Jacinto Seminary and later in the Immaculate Conception School of Theology (ICST), which was run by the SVD fathers at that time. He was ordained to the priesthood by Bishop Constant J. Jurgens, CICM on April 3, 1938.

He is the first Cagayano in history to be consecrated as bishop. He was consecrated bishop on July 2, 1957, at the St. Peter Cathedral by then Apostolic Nuncio to the Philippines Archbishop Egidio Vagnozzi, as principal consecrator. Acting as co-consecrators were Bishop Alejandro A. Olalia of Lipa (previously Bishop of Tuguegarao) and Bishop Peregrin de la Fuente, OP of the Prelature of Batanes and the Babuyan Islands (now Prelature of Batanes). He was also installed as the Fifth Bishop of Tuguegarao.

He was a delegate during the Second Vatican Council (1962–65) and he attended all of the sessions. On September 21, 1974, he was appointed as the first Archbishop of Tuguegarao following the elevation of the diocese of Tuguegarao as an Archdiocese on September 21, 1974.

On January 31, 1986, John Paul II accepted Domingo's resignation, ending the reign of the first Archbishop of the Archdiocese of Tuguegarao, the longest serving prelate of Tuguegarao (1957-1974 as Bishop of Tuguegarao, 1974-1986 as Archbishop of Tuguegarao) up to this date. That same day, he was succeeded by his Auxiliary Bishop Diosdado A. Talamayan as the Second Archbishop of Tuguegarao. He died on June 3, 2002, in Villa Domingo, Solana, Cagayan at the age of 91.

== Coat of Arms ==
Coat of arms of Teodulfo Domingo
As Bishop of Tuguegarao

The coat of arms of the Archdiocese of Tuguegarao appears on the left side of the viewer while that of Archbishop Domingo appears on the right. The Bishop's chosen motto is "Ad Nutum Reginae", meaning "At the Good Pleasure of the Queen."

Catholic Church titles
New title	Archbishop of Tuguegarao; 1974–1986	Succeeded by Diosdado Talamayan
Preceded by Alejandro Olalia	Bishop of Tuguegarao; 1957–1974	Elevated to archdiocese
