= Miguel Purugganan =

Filipino prelate of the Catholic Church (1931–2011)

The Most Reverend Miguel G. Purugganan
- Bishop of Ilagan
- Province: Tuguegarao
- See: Ilagan
- Appointed: January 21, 1974
- Term ended: July 26, 1999
- Predecessor: Francisco Raval Cruces
- Successor: Sergio Lasam Utleg
- Other post: Bishop Emeritus of Ilagan (1999–2011)
- Previous posts: Auxiliary Bishop of Nueva Segovia (1971–1974); Titular Bishop of Egnatia (1971–1974)

Personal details
- Born: November 18, 1931 Cabagan, Isabela, Philippine Islands
- Died: June 7, 2011 (aged 79) Tuguegarao, Cagayan, Philippines
- Motto: Ministrare (To Serve)

Ordination history
History
Episcopal consecration
- Principal consecrator: Carmine Rocco
- Co-consecrators: Juan Callanta Sison, Teodulfo Sabugal Domingo

Styles of Miguel G. Purugganan
- Reference style: The Most Reverend
- Spoken style: Your Excellency
- Religious style: Bishop

Miguel Gatan Purugganan (November 18, 1931 – July 8, 2011) was a Filipino prelate of the Catholic Church who served as the Bishop of Ilagan and became a prominent critic of the dictatorship of President Ferdinand Marcos during the Martial Law era.

== Early life and education ==
Miguel Gatan Purugganan was born in Cabagan, Isabela on November 18, 1931. He entered into a seminary in Vigan, Ilocos Sur and continued to the University of Santo Tomas in Manila before he was ordained in 1957. Subsequently, he took a doctorate degree in canon law at the Gregorian University in Rome, attaining summa cum laude. He then took another doctorate degree in theology, but was ordered to return to the Philippines before he could finish it.

== Priesthood ==
Purugganan started as seminary prefect of discipline. He eventually became bishop’s secretary, assistant parish priest, seminar rector, vicar-general of the diocese of Tuguegarao, auxiliary bishop of the diocese of Nueva Segovia, and from 1974 to 1999, bishop of the diocese of Ilagan. Aged 39, he was one of the youngest bishops in the country.

He was chair of the Catholic Bishops' Conference of the Philippines‘s commission on lay apostolate, and a member of the CBCP’s commissions on canon law and social action, in addition to being a member of its Permanent Council.

== Social work ==
Purugganan was heavily involved in social action work and defending human rights during the Marcos regime, being one of seven bishops who denounced it and martial law who became known as the “Magnificent Seven.”

Purugganan opened diocesan programs to respond to the regime’s repressive policies, particularly to help the poor defend themselves against abuses. Among these programs was the Community-Based Health and Development Program (CBHDP). He built up his diocesan staff for social action in the communities, arousing the suspicion of the military, which believed that they were fronting for the New People’s Army. When some of them were arrested for their work, Purugganan confronted officers at their barracks and demanded their release.

Purugganan provided support for some 20,0000 peasants who were farming an 11,000 hectare-tract of land spanning the Haciendas San Antonio and Santa Isabel in Ilagan, which was being claimed for large-scale commercial agribusiness purposes by Marcos cronies Eduardo “Danding” Cojuangco and Antonio Carag, who in turn were supported by Marcos who sent soldiers to intimidate the residents. In response, many church people, led by Purugganan himself, gave aid and support to the farmers. The Bishop placed the entire social action network under his office to help the farmers’ struggles. In December 1981, he led over 50 priests, nuns and journalists to visit the haciendas in defiance of soldiers and private guards who tried to keep them out.

The Marcos government retaliated by placing Purugganan and his staff under military surveillance. Days after the Aquino assassination in 1983, soldiers raided his residence in Ilagan and a nearby nuns’ residence in an unsuccessful attempt to find weapons and wanted persons. Purugganan denounced these raids and continued in his advocacy, even after the collapse of the Marcos regime in 1986. He later successfully campaigned against the proposal to divide the province of Isabela into two separate provinces in a 1995 plebiscite, which had been criticized as an attempt at gerrymandering by ruling political dynasties.

Purugganan also helped found the Basic Christian Communities – Community Organizing (BCC-CO) program, serving as its chair. It became one of the most effective ways that church people empowered communities by teaching people their rights and interests, urging them to struggle for their demands, and to resist martial law. The BCC-CO encouraged communities to make the regime accountable for its excesses, and often led demands to stop militarization in the countryside.

== Death ==
Purugganan died due to cardiac arrest on July 8, 2011, at the Saint Paul Hospital in Tuguegarao City, Cagayan.

== Legacy ==
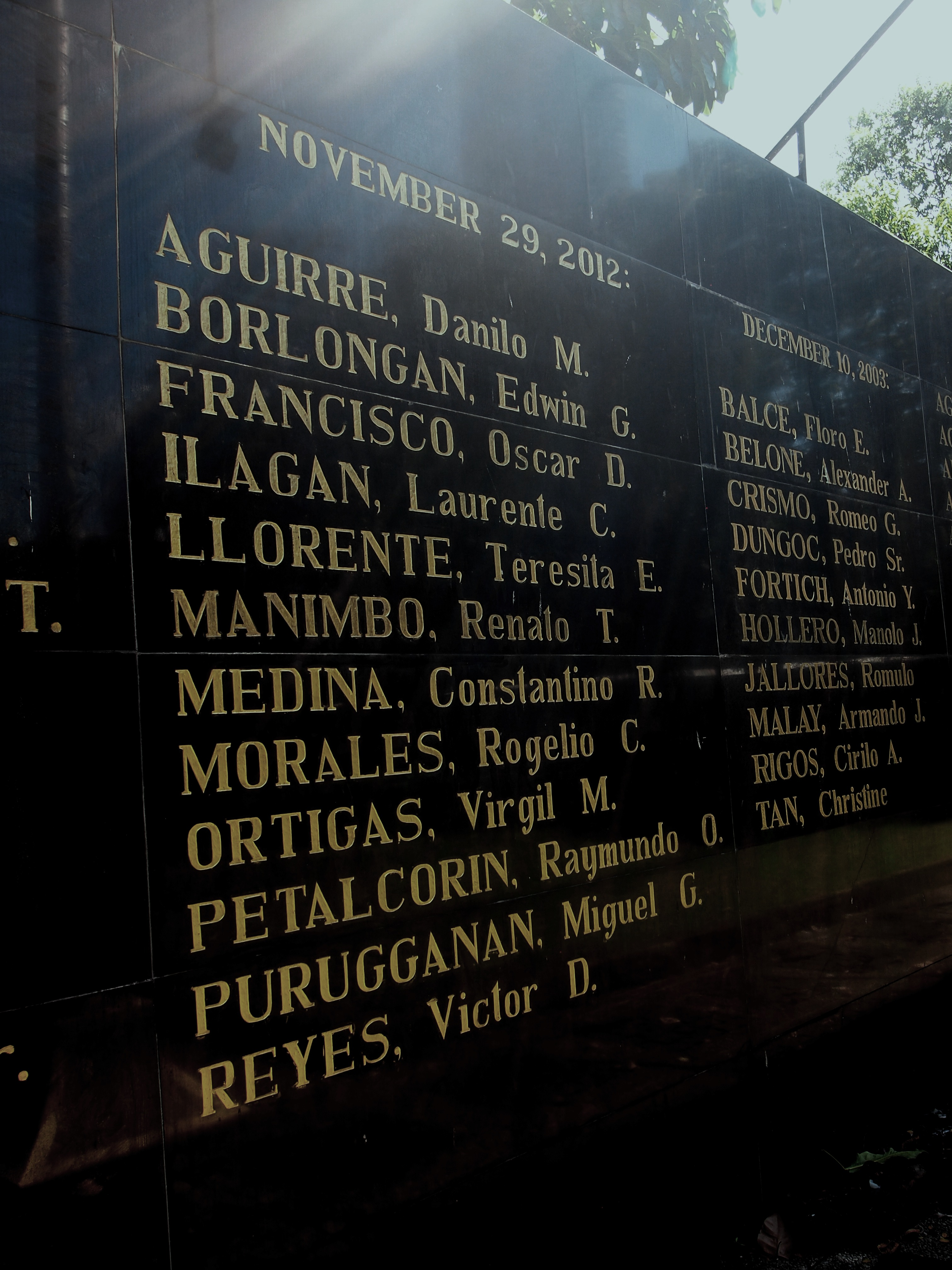
Detail of the Wall of Remembrance at the Bantayog ng mga Bayani, showing names from the 2012 batch of Bantayog Honorees, including that of Miguel Purugganan.

In recognition of his efforts, his name is inscribed on the Wall of Remembrance at the Bantayog ng mga Bayani in Quezon City, which honors the heroes and martyrs who fought the Marcos dictatorship.
