= Diocese of Ilagan =

Latin Catholic diocese in the Philippines

Coordinates: 17.1490°N 121.8891°E

Diocese of Ilagan Dioecesis Ilaganensis Diócesis ti Ilagan Diyosesis ng Ilagan Diócesis de Ilagán

Catholic
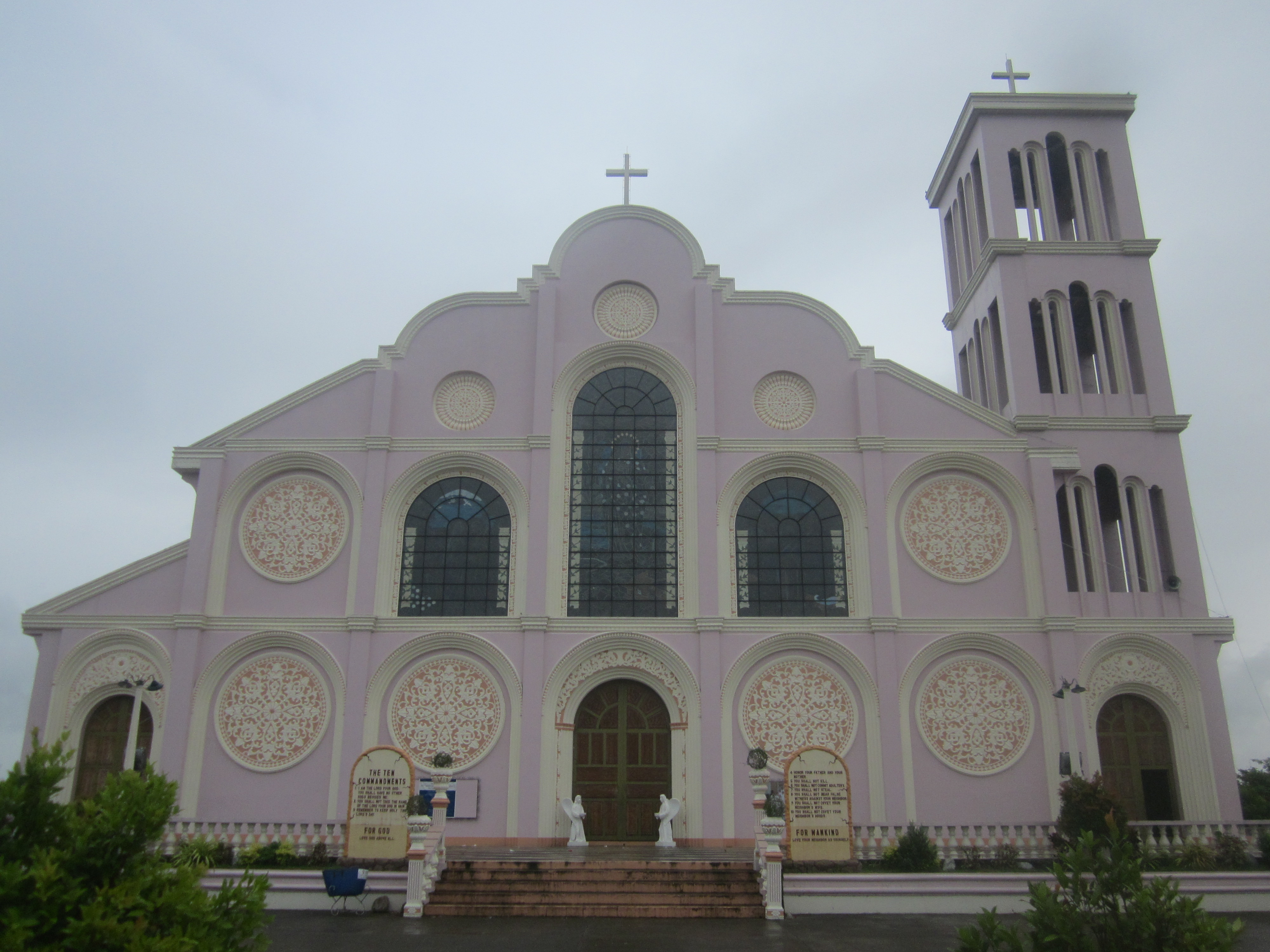
- Gamu Cathedral

- Coat of arms

Location
- Country: Philippines
- Territory: Isabela
- Ecclesiastical province: Tuguegarao
- Metropolitan: Tuguegarao

Statistics
- Area: 12,556 km^{2} (4,848 sq mi)
- Population: Total; Catholics: (as of 2021); 1,741,750; 1,368,520 (78.6%)
- Parishes: 38

Information
- Denomination: Catholic
- Sui iuris church: Latin Church
- Rite: Roman Rite
- Established: 31 January 1970
- Cathedral: Cathedral of Saint Michael the Archangel (Gamu)
- Co-cathedral: Saint Ferdinand Parish Church (Ilagan; former cathedral)
- Titular patrons: Ferdinand of Castile; Our Lady of the Visitation of Guibang; Michael the Archangel
- Secular priests: 38

Current leadership
- Pope: Leo XIV
- Bishop: Sede vacante
- Metropolitan Archbishop: Ricardo Baccay
- Vicar General: Edmundo "June" Castaneda

The former coat of arms of the Diocese of Ilagan, featuring a crown (now removed) and sword for St. Ferdinand the King.

The Diocese of Ilagan (Lat: Dioecesis Ilaganensis) is a Latin Catholic diocese of the Catholic Church in the Philippines. It was erected on 31 January 1970 from territory of the then Roman Catholic Diocese of Tuguegarao and covered the entire civil Province of Isabela. At the time of Ilagan's creation, Tuguegarao was not a Metropolitan diocese and therefore Ilagan fell under the jurisdiction of Archdiocese of Nueva Segovia. It is a suffragan diocese of the Roman Catholic Archdiocese of Tuguegarao since 1974 when Tuguegarao was elevated to an archdiocese.

The diocese has had no jurisdictional changes. The seat of the diocese used to be located in Saint Ferdinand Parish Church in Ilagan City before being transferred to the Gamu Cathedral (Cathedral of Saint Michael the Archangel) in Gamu, Isabela, in 2013.

David William V. Antonio was installed as the fifth Bishop of Ilagan on February 12, 2019.

== Ordinaries ==
No	Name	In office	Coat of arms
1.	Francisco Cruces	(4 March 1970 – 22 August 1973)	
2.	Miguel Purugganan	(21 January 1974 – 26 July 1999)	
3.	Sergio Utleg	(26 July 1999 – 13 November 2006)	
4.	Joseph Amangi Nacua	(10 June 2008 – 25 February 2017)	
5.	David William Antonio	(12 February 2019 – 04 November 2025)	

== See also ==
- Catholic Church in the Philippines
- List of Catholic dioceses in the Philippines
