= Ricardo Baccay =

Filipino archbishop

The Most Reverend Ricardo Baccay D.D.
- Archbishop of Tuguegarao
- Church: Catholic Church
- Archdiocese: Tuguegarao, Philippines
- Appointed: October 18, 2019
- Installed: January 14, 2020
- Predecessor: Sergio Utleg
- Successor: incumbent
- Previous posts: North Luzon Regional Representative, CBCP Permanent Council (2019–2023); Chairman, CBCP Episcopal Office on Bioethics (2013–2021); Bishop of Alaminos (2016–2019); Auxiliary Bishop of Tuguegarao (2007–2016); Titular Bishop of Gabala (2007–2016)

Orders
- Ordination: April 10, 1987 by Diosdado Aenlle Talamayan
- Consecration: April 10, 2007 by Fernando Filoni

Personal details
- Born: April 3, 1961 (age 65) Tuguegarao
- Motto: Pater Benignus ad Omnes (Latin for 'The Father is Kind to All')
- Coat of arms: Ricardo Baccay's coat of arms

Ordination history
History
Priestly ordination
- Ordained by: Diosdado Talamayan
Episcopal consecration
- Principal consecrator: Fernando Filoni
- Co-consecrators: Teodulfo Domingo; Miguel Purugganan
- Styles
- Reference style: His Excellency; The Most Reverend
- Spoken style: Your Excellency
- Religious style: Archbishop

Ricardo Lingan Baccay (born April 3, 1961) is the fourth Archbishop of the Archdiocese of Tuguegarao.

== Biography ==
Ricardo Lingan Baccay was born in Tuguegarao on April 3, 1961. He attended the secondary schools at the San Jacinto seminary and did his studies in philosophy and theology at the University of Santo Tomas in Manila. He was subsequently awarded a Master of Arts at the Lyceum of Aparri and a doctorate in educational management from the University of Manila. He was ordained a priest together with Bishop Danilo Ulep of Batanes on April 10, 1987, by Archbishop Diosdado Aenlle Talamayan.

On February 3, 2007, Pope Benedict XVI appointed him Auxiliary Bishop of Tuguegarao and Titular Bishop of Gabala. He was consecrated bishop on April 10, 2007, by Fernando Filoni, Apostolic Nuncio to the Philippines. Co-consecrators were Diosdado Aenlle Talamayan, Archbishop of Tuguegarao; and Sergio Lasam Utleg, Bishop of Laoag.

On February 20, 2016, Pope Francis appointed him as the third Bishop of the Diocese of Alaminos in Pangasinan. After three years, on October 18, 2019, Pope Francis appointed him as the Fourth Archbishop of Tuguegarao in Cagayan following the resignation of Archbishop Sergio Utleg and returning him to the Ecclesiastical Province of Tuguegarao. He was installed on January 14, 2020, and received the pallium, a symbol of authority as metropolitan archbishop, exactly a year later.

Catholic Church titles
Preceded by Marlo Peralta	Bishop of Alaminos; May 4, 2016 – October 18, 2019	Succeeded by Napoleon Sipalay
Preceded by Sergio Utleg	Archbishop of Tuguegarao; January 14, 2020 – present	Incumbent
