= Christ the King Mission Seminary =

Roman Catholic seminary in Quezon City, Philippines

Divine Word Mission Seminary
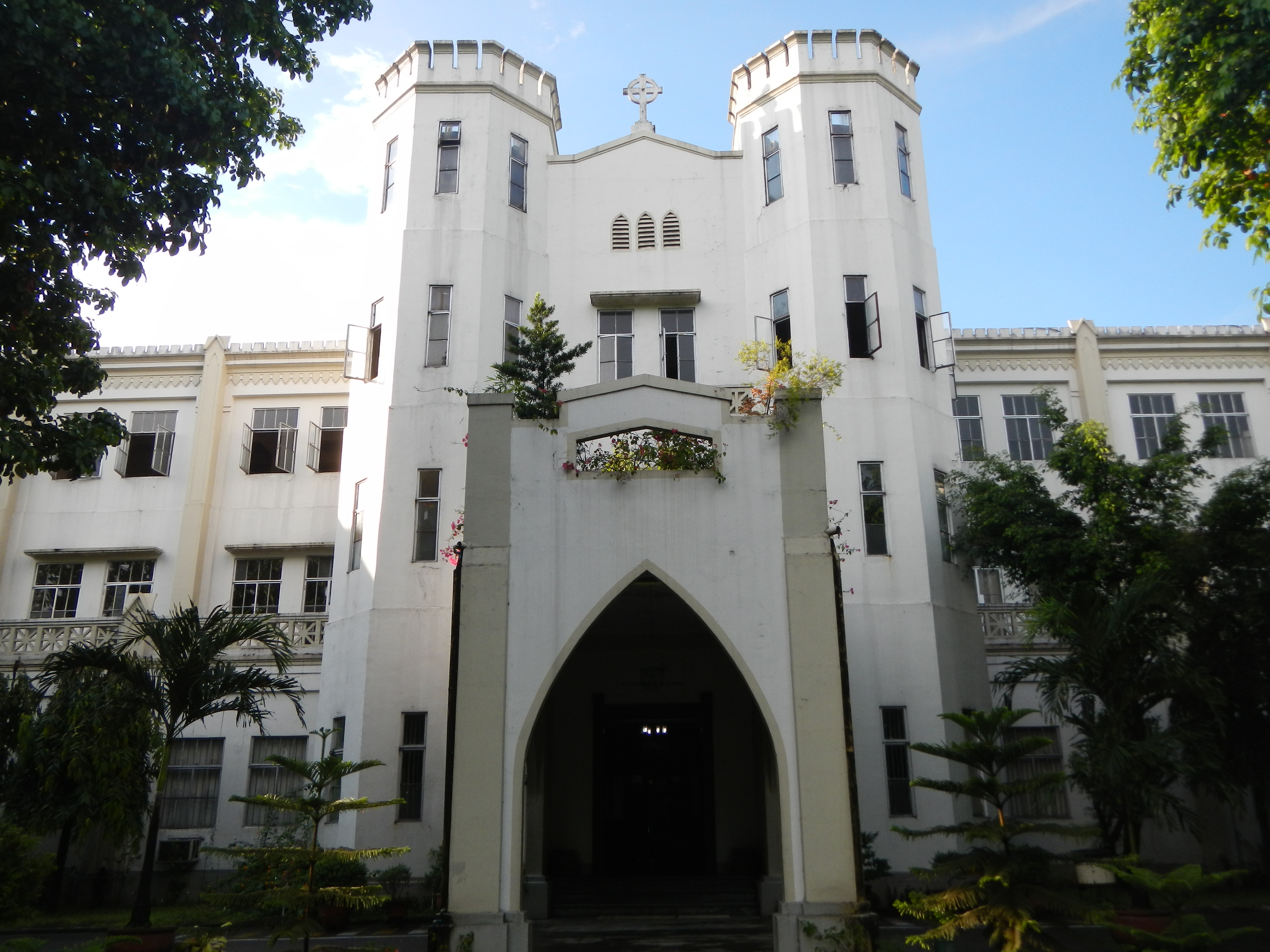
- Other name: Christ the King Mission Seminary
- Type: Seminary
- Established: 1933; 93 years ago
- Founder: Fr. Theodore Buttenbruch
- Affiliations: DWEA, CEAP
- Religious affiliation: Roman Catholic; Society of the Divine Word
- Rector: Rev. Fr. Glenn Paul Gomez, SVD
- Location: 1101 E. Rodriguez Sr. Avenue, Quezon City, Philippines; 14°37′28″N 121°01′46″E
- Campus: Urban
- Colors: Blue

The Divine Word Mission Seminary (also known as Christ the King Mission Seminary) is a Roman Catholic seminary in Quezon City, Philippines, operated by the Divine Word Missionaries.

The seminary offers junior and senior high school education and both a bachelor's degree and a master's degree program in philosophy. This seminary is also known as the Society of the Divine Word (SVD).
