= David William Antonio =

Archbishop of Nueva Segovia

His Excellency, The Most Reverend David William Antonio D.D., S.Th.D.
- Metropolitan Archbishop of Nueva Segovia
- Church: Catholic Church
- Archdiocese: Nueva Segovia
- See: Nueva Segovia
- Appointed: November 4, 2025
- Installed: January 14, 2026
- Predecessor: Marlo Peralta
- Successor: Incumbent
- Other posts: North Luzon Regional Representative, CBCP Permanent Council (2023- present); Chairman, CBCP Episcopal Commission on Liturgy (2023- present)
- Previous posts: Archbishop of Nueva Segovia (2026- ); Bishop of Ilagan (2018-2026); Chairman, CBCP Episcopal Commission on Vocations (2017-2021); Apostolic Administrator of Apostolic Vicariate of San Jose in Mindoro (2015-2023); Auxiliary Bishop of Nueva Segovia (2011-2018); Titular Bishop of Basti (2011-2018)

Orders
- Ordination: December 1, 1988
- Consecration: August 26, 2011 by Giuseppe Pinto

Personal details
- Born: David William Valencia Antonio; December 29, 1963 (age 62) Nagtupacan, Santo Domingo, Ilocos Sur, Philippines
- Motto: Ut vitam habeant (Latin for 'That they may have life')
- Coat of arms

Styles of David William Antonio
- Reference style: His Excellency; The Most Reverend
- Spoken style: Your Excellency
- Religious style: Archbishop

David William Valencia Antonio (born December 29, 1963) is a Philippine prelate of the Catholic Church who serves as the Metropolitan Archbishop of Nueva Segovia.

== Biography ==
David William Valencia Antonio was born in Nagtupacan, Santo Domingo, Ilocos Sur, on December 29, 1963. He attended philosophy classes at San Pablo Seminary in Baguio, and theology courses at Immaculate Conception School of Theology in Vigan. He was ordained a priest on December 1, 1988, in the Archdiocese of Nueva Segovia. He earned a Doctorate of Sacred Theology from The Catholic University of America in 1999.

After some years as professor at the Immaculate Conception School of Theology, he was appointed dean of studies in 1993, and then rector of the same seminary.

In 2005, he became parish priest in Santa Lucia, Ilocos Sur, and later vicar-general of the Archdiocese of Nueva Segovia.

On June 15, 2011, Pope Benedict XVI appointed him Auxiliary Bishop of Nueva Segovia and Titular Bishop of Basti. He was consecrated bishop on 26 August 2011 by Giuseppe Pinto, then the Apostolic Nuncio to the Philippines. Co-consecrators were Ernesto Antolin Salgado, the Archbishop of Nueva Segovia, and Orlando Beltrán Quevedo, the present Cardinal-Archbishop of Cotabato.

On November 21, 2015, Pope Francis named him Apostolic Administrator of the Apostolic Vicariate of San José in Mindoro. On November 14, 2018, Francis appointed him Bishop of Ilagan in Isabela.

On November 4, 2025, Pope Leo XIV appointed him Metropolitan Archbishop of Nueva Segovia, succeeding Marlo Peralta. He was installed to that position on January 14, 2026, at the co-cathedral and Minor Basilica of Our Lady of the Assumption by Archbishop Charles John Brown, Apostolic Nuncio to the Philippines, concelebrated by several bishops, including three Cardinals: Jose Advincula, Archbishop of Manila; Orlando Quevedo, Archbishop-Emeritus of Cotabato (and former Archbishop of Nueva Segovia); and Luis Antonio Tagle, Pro-Prefect of the Dicastery for Evangelization, who gave the homily. He received the pallium from Leo XIV at St. Peter's Basilica on June 29, 2026, Solemnity of Saints Peter and Paul, together with two other Filipino Archbishops, Alberto Uy of the Archdiocese of Cebu, and Charlie Inzon of the Archdiocese of Cotabato.

Catholic Church titles
Preceded by Marlo Peralta	Archbishop of Nueva Segovia; January 14, 2026 – present	Incumbent
Preceded by Joseph Nacua	Bishop of Ilagan; February 12, 2019 – November 4, 2025	Sede vacante
Preceded by Antonio Marino	— TITULAR — Bishop of Basti; August 26, 2011 – November 14, 2018	Succeeded by Joseba Segura Etxezarraga
