= Archdiocese of Tuguegarao =

Latin Catholic archdiocese in the Philippines

Coordinates: 17.6137°N 121.7300°E

Archdiocese of Tuguegarao Archidioecesis Tuguegaraoana: Arkidiocesis ti Tuguegarao (Ilocano); Arkidiocesis nat Tuguegaraw (Ibanag); Arkidiocesis yo Tuguegeraw (Itawit); Archidiocensya yoh Tuguegaraow (Malaweg); Arkidiyosesis ng Tuguegarao (Filipino); Arquidiócesis de Tuguegarao (Spanish)

Catholic
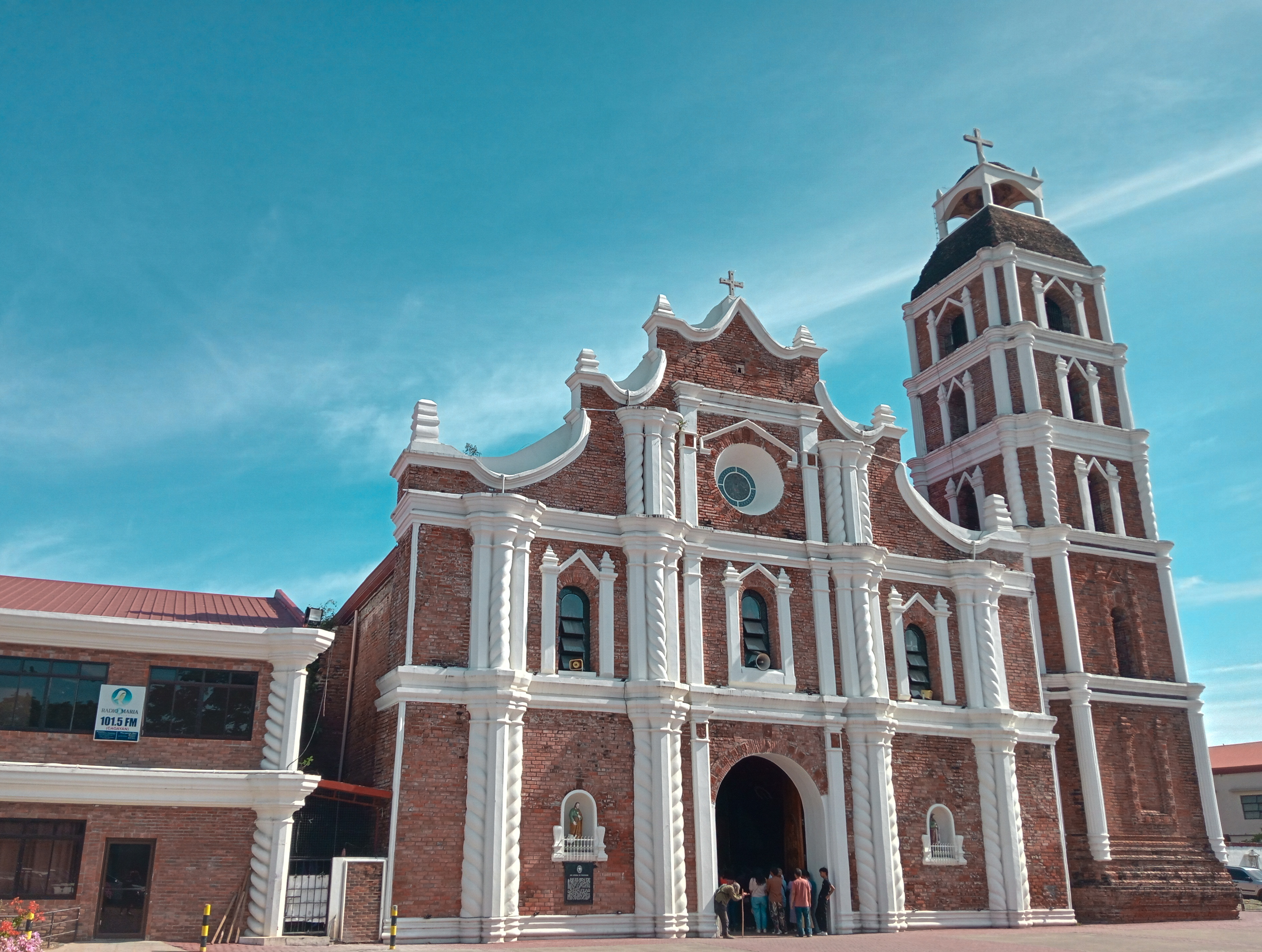
- Tuguegarao Cathedral

- Coat of arms

Location
- Country: Philippines
- Territory: Cagayan
- Ecclesiastical province: Tuguegarao
- Metropolitan: Tuguegarao

Statistics
- Area: 9,296 km^{2} (3,589 sq mi)
- Population: Total; Catholics: (as of 2021); 2,081,000; 1,650,000 (79.3%)
- Parishes: 50

Information
- Denomination: Catholic Church
- Sui iuris church: Latin Church
- Rite: Roman Rite
- Established: April 10, 1910; 116 years ago (Diocese); September 21, 1974; 52 years ago (Archdiocese)
- Cathedral: Metropolitan Cathedral of St. Peter the Apostle
- Patron saint: Peter the Apostle
- Secular priests: 75

Current leadership
- Pope: Leo XIV
- Metropolitan Archbishop: Ricardo Lingan Baccay
- Suffragans: Sede vacante (Ilagan); Jose Elmer Mangalinao (Bayombong); Danilo Ulep (Batanes)
- Vicar General: Gerard Ariston P. Perez
- Bishops emeritus: Diosdado Aenlle Talamayan; Sergio Lasam Utleg

Map
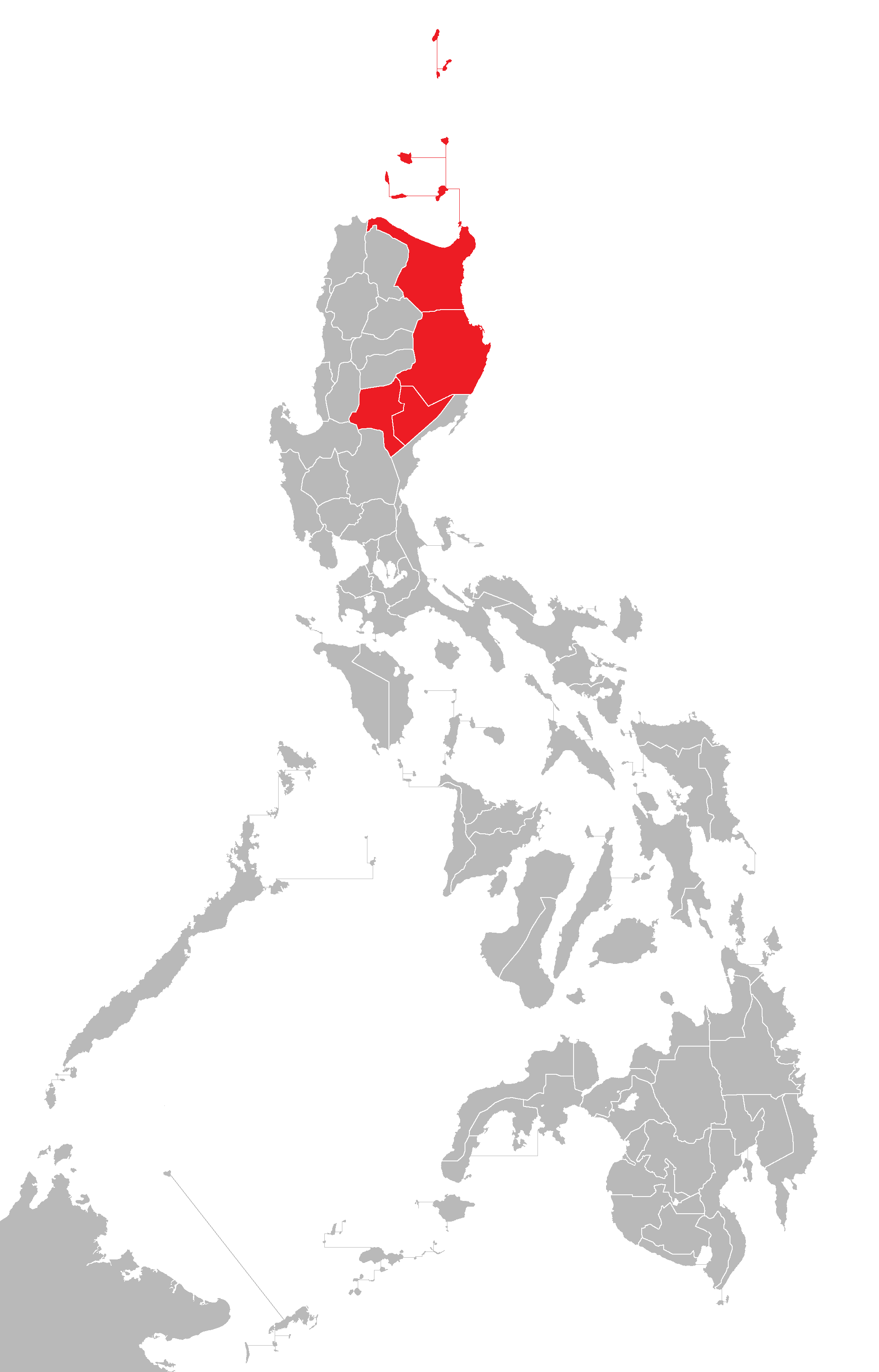
- Jurisdiction of the metropolitan see within the Philippines.

The Archdiocese of Tuguegarao is a Latin Catholic metropolitan archdiocese of the Catholic Church in the Philippines. Tuguegarao is a river delta city that became the center of the archdiocese in the province of Cagayan, on the island of Luzon. Its seat is located at the Saint Peter the Apostle Metropolitan Cathedral.

== Description ==
The Metropolitan Archdiocese of Tuguegarao, the present territorial jurisdiction of the Archdiocese of Tuguegarao covers the entire province of Cagayan.

== History ==
The missionaries of Order of Preachers first evangelized Cagayan in 1595. They brought not only the tenets of Christian faith but also western technologies, infrastructures and ideas that helped in the livelihood and welfare of the Cagayanos. The Church of Saint Peter was constructed in 1761. It later became the diocesan cathedral.

The Diocese of Tuguegarao was created April 10, 1910 with decree of the Congregation of the Sacred Consistory "Nova Diocesum Circumscriptio In Insulis Philippinis". Until 1910 Tuguegarao was part of the Diocese of Nueva Segovia. In the same year the ancient city of "Nueva Segovia" (now Lal-lo) became part of the Diocese of Tuguegarao (the see of the Diocese of Nueva Segovia is in Vigan, since 1758). At the time of its foundation until 1951, its territorial jurisdiction stretched from the Batanes to Nueva Vizcaya.

The first bishop of Tuguegarao was Bishop Maurice P. Foley and he took possession of his diocese on December 6, 1911. Father John E. Killion was his secretary. He convoked the first Diocesan Synod of Tuguegarao from April 16–19, 1912. After his appointment as bishop of Jaro, he was succeeded by Bishop Santiago C. Sancho as the second bishop of Tuguegarao. He established the San Jacinto Seminary in 1980 in order to cater to the formation of native clergy and it was given to the administration of Dominicans of the Collegio de San Jacinto. He convoked the second Diocesan Synod of Tuguegarao from April 12–14, 1923.

Sancho was appointed bishop of Nueva Segovia in 1927 and he was succeeded by Bishop Constant J. Jurgens as the third bishop of Tuguegarao. He was regarded as the "Teaching Bishop" because of his priority for education as a tool for evangelization. He also promoted catechism for children and the devotion to the blessed Mother in his diocese. He convoked the third Diocesan Synod of Tuguegarao from August 27–28, 1935. Jurgens was the bishop of Tuguegarao during the Second World War.

Jurgens resigned on May 6, 1950, and he was succeeded by his Coadjutor, Bishop Alejandro A. Olalia. He re-opened the San Jacinto Seminary as a minor seminary 18-years after it was closed by his predecessor in 1932. Olalia took part in the First Plenary Council of the Philippines in 1953. Upon his appointment as bishop of Lipa, a four-year vacancy ensued the diocese. The auxiliary bishop of Nueva Segovia, Juan C. Sison, served as apostolic administrator. There were significant events that occurred in those 4 years. On June 20, 1954, the image of Our Lady of Piat was canonically crowned by the Apostolic Nuncio to the Philippines, Archbishop Egidio Vagnozzi at the patio of the St. Peter's Cathedral. He also built the present residence and offices of the bishop of Tuguegarao.

In 1957, Teodulfo S. Domingo was appointed as the fourth bishop of Tuguegarao and he was the first native of Cagayan to be consecrated as bishop. Domingo took part in all the session of the Second Vatican Council and he was a witness to the early years of the implementation of council's reforms in the diocese of Tuguegarao. On September 21, 1974, Tuguegarao was elevated as an archdiocese by Pope Paul VI and Domingo was appointed as the first archbishop of Tuguegarao. He is the longest serving ordinary of Tuguegarao.

Having reached the mandatory retirement age of 75, Domingo resigned on January 31, 1986, and he was succeeded by the auxiliary bishop of Tuguegarao, Diosdado A. Talamayan, as the second archbishop of Tuguegarao. He founded the priestly formation institute at the Lyceum of Aparri in 1990. He took part in the Second Plenary Council of the Philippines in 1991 and later convoked the first Archdiocesan Pastoral Assembly of Tuguegarao also that same year.

On March 10, 1997, the Sanctuary of the Our Lady of Piat was elevated to a Minor Basilica by Pope John Paul II.

On June 15, 2011, Talamayan was succeeded by Bishop Sergio L. Utleg as the third archbishop of Tuguegarao. Utleg is renowned of his advocacies promoting social justice and the protection of the integrity of creation.

On October 18, 2019, Pope Francis accepted the resignation of Archbishop Utleg and he was succeeded by Bishop Ricardo L. Baccay as the fourth Archbishop of Tuguegarao. He is the first archbishop of Tuguegarao from Tuguegarao City. He was installed on January 14, 2020, at the St. Peter's Metropolitan Cathedral.

== Historical summary ==
| Date | Event | From | To |
|---|---|---|---|
| 10 Apr 1910 | Erected | Diocese of Nueva Segovia | Diocese of Tuguegarao (erected) |
| 30 Nov 1950 | Territory Lost | Diocese of Tuguegarao | Territorial Prelature of Batanes and the Babuyan Islands (erected) |
| 29 Jun 1951 | Metropolitan Changed | | Diocese of Tuguegarao (from Manila) |
| 7 Nov 1966 | Territory Lost | Diocese of Tuguegarao | Territorial Prelature of Bayombong (erected) |
| 31 Jan 1970 | Territory Lost | Diocese of Tuguegarao | Diocese of Ilagan (erected) |
| 21 Sept 1974 | Elevated | Diocese of Tuguegarao | Archdiocese of Tuguegarao |

== Coat of arms ==
| Arms | Blazon | Notes |
|---|---|---|
| | "Vert (green), a pale wavy argent (silver) and a fleur-de-lys counterchaged in argent (silver) and azure (blue) surmounting in center, accosted in dexter chief by two keys or (gold) and argent (silver) addorsed and crossed debruising an inverted latin cross tenné (tan), and a sun (or) "in splendour" in sinister chief, between two fire proper in center and mountain or (gold) in base paleways." | Present coat of arms of the archdiocese (1986–present) |
| | "Between two vert (green) fields is a azure (blue) wavy pale with a argent (silver) fluer-de-lys in the center. On chief of the dexter field are two or (gold) keys crossed debruising a Latin cross with its head downwards. On sinister field is a or (gold) sun in splendour. On center of each green field is fire proper and at base are argent (silver) mountains drawn in the Italian heraldric style." | Coat of arms impaled in the coat of arms of Archbishop Teodulfo Domingo (1957–1986) |
| | "Per bend sinister azure (silver) and gules (red), a sword in pale argent (silver), the hilt up or (gold), between two keys paleways addorsed, wards up, the dexter of the fourth, the sinister of the third, in dexter chief a star of six points or (gold) of the fourth." | Coat of arms seen in the coat of arms of Bishop Maurice Foley and designed by Pierre de Chaignon la Rose (1910–1916). |

== Suffragan dioceses and bishops ==
| Diocese | Bishop | Period in office | Coat of arms |
|---|---|---|---|
| Ilagan (Isabela) | Sede vacante | Since November 4, 2025 (326 days) | |
| Bayombong (Nueva Vizcaya and Quirino) | Jose Elmer Imas Mangalinao | July 25, 2018 – present (8 years, 63 days) | |
| Batanes (Batanes) | Danilo Bangayan Ulep | August 8, 2017 – present (9 years, 49 days) | |

== Episcopal ordinaries ==
Bishops

| No. | Name | | From | Until | Coat of arms |
|---|---|---|---|---|---|
| 1 | | Maurice Patrick Foley | September 1, 1910 | September 6, 1916 | |
| 2 | | Santiago Caragnan Sancho | February 5, 1917 | April 22, 1927 | |
| 3 | Ilmo. y Revmo. Mgr. Constancio Jurgens | Constant Jurgens, CICM | January 27, 1928 | May 6, 1950 | |
| 4 | | Alejandro Ayson Olalia | May 6, 1950 | December 28, 1953 | |
| Sede Vacante - Apostolic Administrator | | Juan Callanta Sison | December 28, 1953 | April 29, 1957 | |
| 5 | | Teodulfo Sabugal Domingo | April 29, 1957 | September 21, 1974 | |

Archbishops

| No. | Picture | Name | From | Until | Coat of arms |
|---|---|---|---|---|---|
| 1 | | Teodulfo Sabugal Domingo | September 21, 1974 | January 31, 1986 | |
| 2 | | Diosadado Aenelle Talamayan | January 31, 1986 | June 15, 2011 | |
| 3 | | Sergio Lasam Utleg | June 15, 2011 | October 18, 2019 | |
| 4 | | Ricardo Lingan Baccay | October 18, 2019 | Incumbent | |

== Auxiliary bishops ==
| No. | Picture | Name | From | Until | Titular See |
|---|---|---|---|---|---|
| 1 | | Salvador Lazo Lazo | December 1, 1969 | August 3, 1977 (Appointed, Auxiliary Bishop of Nueva Segovia) | Selia |
| 2 | | Paciano Basilio Aniceto | April 7, 1979 | October 20, 1983 (Appointed, Bishop of Iba) | Tlos |
| 3 | | Diosdado Aenlle Talamayan | October 20, 1983 | January 31, 1986, (Succeeded, 2nd Archbishop of Tuguegarao) | Girus |
| 4 | | Ricardo Lingan Baccay | April 10, 2007 | February 20, 2016 (Appointed, Bishop of Alaminos) | Gabala |

== Other priests of this diocese who became bishops ==
- Miguel Gatan Purugganan (March 2, 1957, appointed Auxiliary Bishop of Nueva Segovia; later appointed as Bishop of Ilagan)
- Ramon Barrera Villena (March 30, 1963, appointed Auxiliary Bishop of Tagum; later appointed Bishop of Bayombong)
- Salvador Lazo Lazo (Aug 3, 1977, Appointed, Auxiliary Bishop of Nueva Segovia; later appointed as Bishop of San Fernando de La Union)
- Rodolfo Fontiveros Beltran (Mar 18, 2006, Appointed, Vicar Apostolic of Bontoc-Lagawe; later appointed as Bishop of San Fernando de La Union)
- Danilo Bangayan Ulep (May 20, 2017, Appointed, Bishop-Prelate of Batanes)

== Address ==
The office of the Archdiocese of Tuguegarao is currently located at The Archbishop's Palace, Rizal Street, Centro 10, Tuguegarao City, Cagayan, Philippines.

== See also ==
- Catholic Church in the Philippines
- List of Catholic dioceses in the Philippines
