= Tuguegarao Cathedral =

Roman Catholic cathedral in Cagayan, Philippines

- Saint Peter Metropolitan Cathedral
- Kalakhang Katedral ni San Pedro Apostol (Filipino); Catedral Metropolitana de San Pedro Apostol (Spanish)
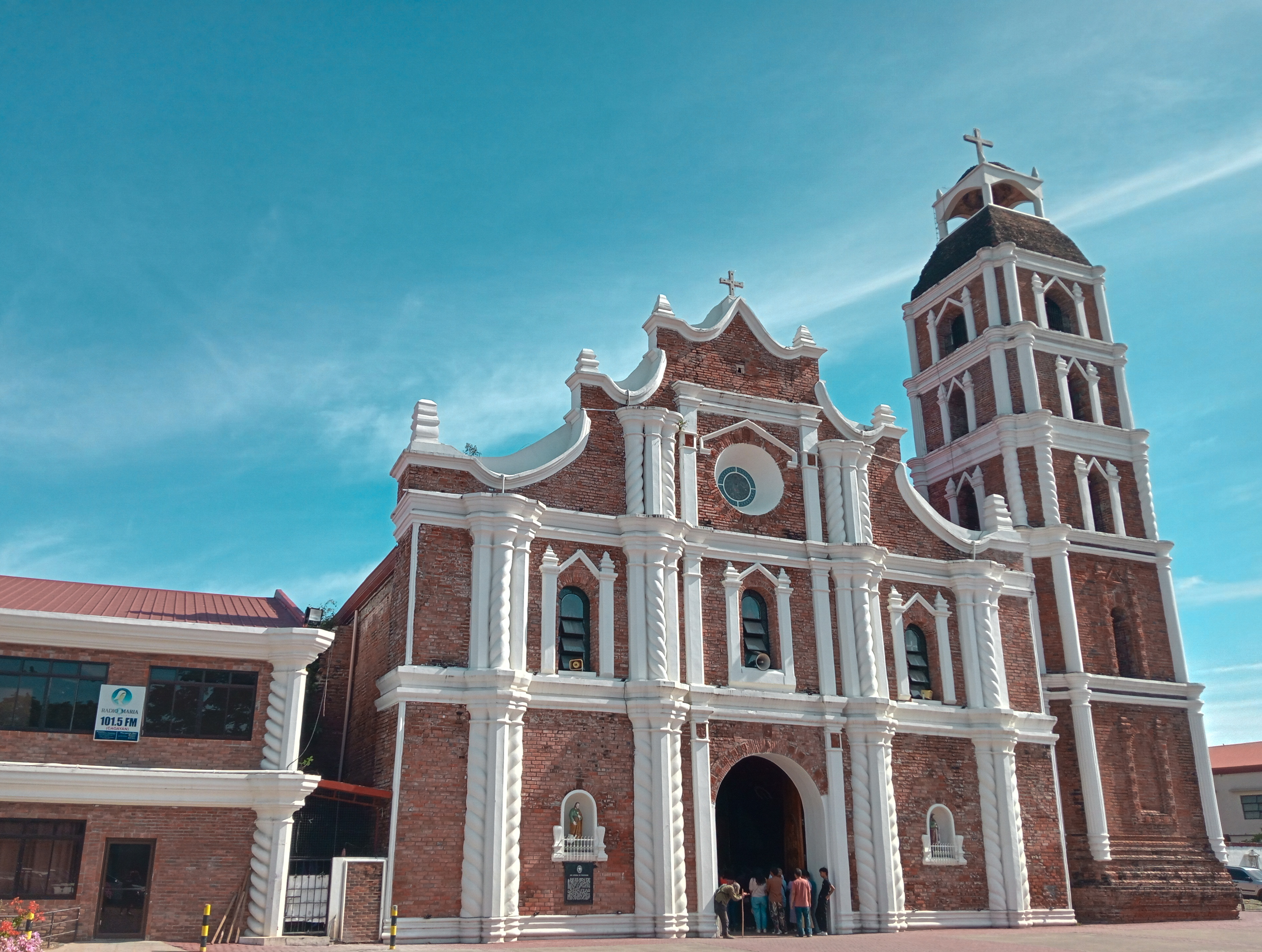
- Cathedral facade in March 2024

- Location in Luzon Location in the Philippines
- 17°36′49″N 121°43′50″E
- Location: Tuguegarao City
- Country: Philippines
- Denomination: Roman Catholic

History
- Dedication: Saint Peter
- Dedicated: 1761, 2014

Architecture
- Functional status: Active
- Architect: Antonio Lobato
- Architectural type: Cathedral
- Style: Barn-style Baroque
- Groundbreaking: 1761
- Completed: 1768

Specifications
- Materials: Sand, gravel, cement, mortar, steel and bricks

Administration
- Province: Tuguegarao
- Metropolis: Tuguegarao
- Archdiocese: Tuguegarao
- Deanery: St. Peter the Apostle

Clergy
- Archbishop: Ricardo Lingan Baccay
- Rector: Franklin Manibog

Saint Peter Metropolitan Cathedral, commonly known as Tuguegarao Cathedral, is an 18th-century Baroque Roman Catholic church located along Rizal Street, Barangay Centro 10, Tuguegarao City, Philippines. The church, originally built by Dominican friars, is the seat of the Archdiocese of Tuguegarao and is considered one of the largest churches in the Cagayan Valley. A historical marker bearing a brief history of the church was installed in 1982 by the National Historical Institute, precursor of the National Historical Commission of the Philippines.

== History ==
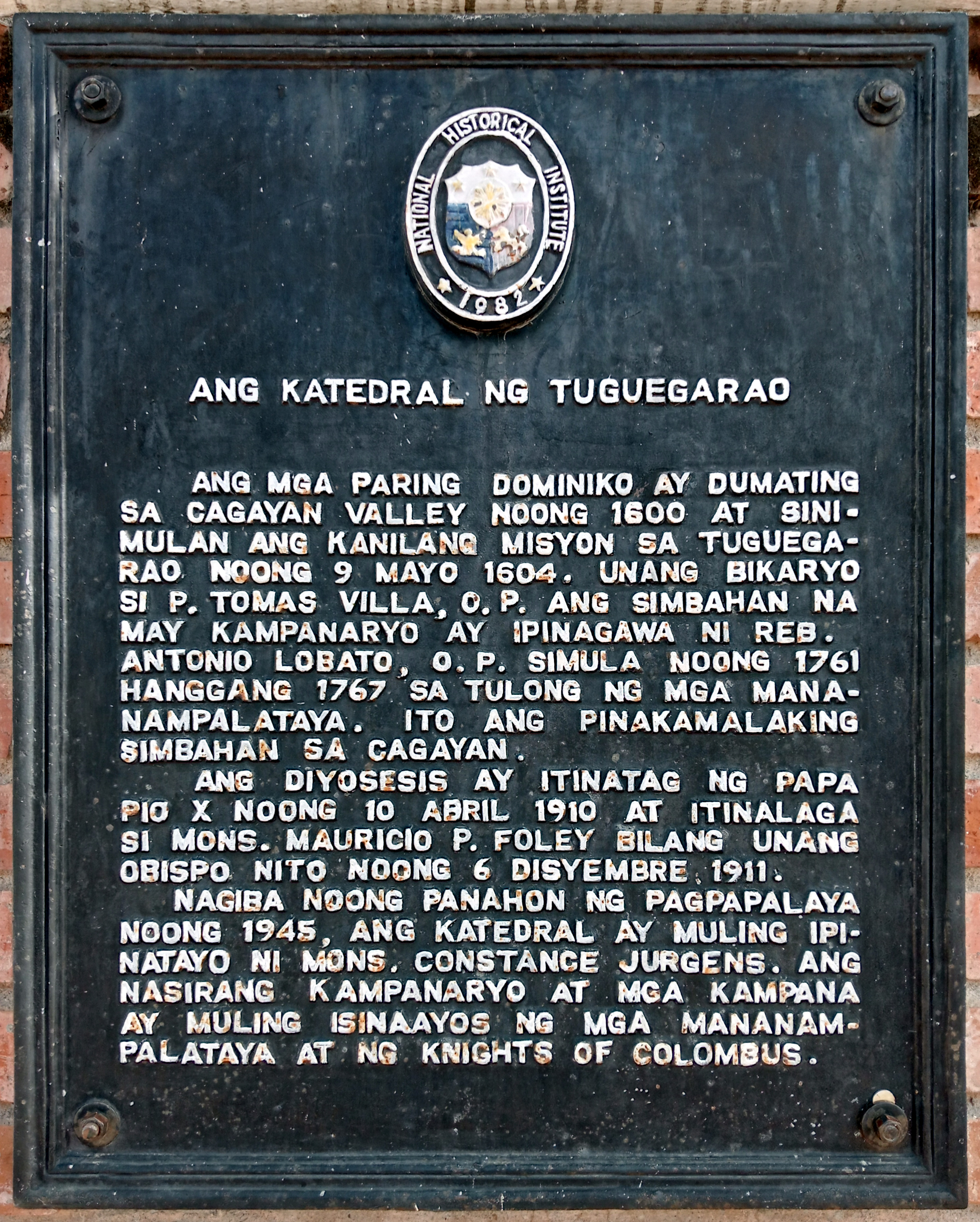
Church NHI historical marker installed in 1982

Tuguegarao was founded as a mission on May 9, 1604, by Dominican friars. Tomas Villa was assigned as its first vicar. Villa erected a temporary parochial structure made of light materials with Saint Peter and Saint Paul as patron saints. The current church is attributed to Antonio Lobato, who initiated the construction in 1761 and was completed in 1768. The reason why it is called "Cathedral" is because of the chair of the archbishop The church sustained heavy damage during World War II, that resulted in the loss of its records, and was subsequently rebuilt by Bishop Constance Jurgens.

== Architecture ==
The cathedral's façade is described as whimsical and playful. Most notable of all its features is the broken and crested pediment that is mirrored in other churches in the Cagayan Valley namely, the churches of Dupax del Sur and Bambang and Saint Dominic's Cathedral in Nueva Vizcaya. Archival photos of the Calasiao Church in Pangasinan also showed that it once had the “Cagayan-style” pediment. Other notable architectural features of the church are consistently repeated on many of its parts and on the Ermita de San Jacinto, a Spanish-era brick chapel located on the opposite site of the Tuguegarao city proper.

Architectural Detail	Location	Photo
High relief pilasters with alternating smooth and Solomonic/swisted design	Found on the façade and bell tower	
Semicircular arch windows framed with finials and a triangular pediment	Found on the façade and majority of windows on the structure	
Molded bricks containing various symbols such as roosters, papal tiaras, keys, gods, sun, moon, Marian symbols and symbols of the Dominican order	Found on both interior and exterior of the structure outlining windows and columns	

The main focal point of the façade is the deeply recessed oculus. To the left of the church rises the five-storey quadrilateral bell tower. The tower mirrors motifs from the façade such as the pilasters and framed windows. Blind windows can be found on the base. The bell tower is topped with a roofed canopy and a cross.

Some few meters away from the church is the Catholic cemetery with its notable brick arched entryway and fence.

=== Restoration ===
Spearheaded by the city's parish priest, Gerard Ariston Perez, the parishioners started accumulating 25 million pesos for the restoration of the church. Included in the church's restoration are the rehabilitation of worn-out bricks, reverting the original painted ceiling from the trussed ceiling and the altarpieces.

== Gallery ==
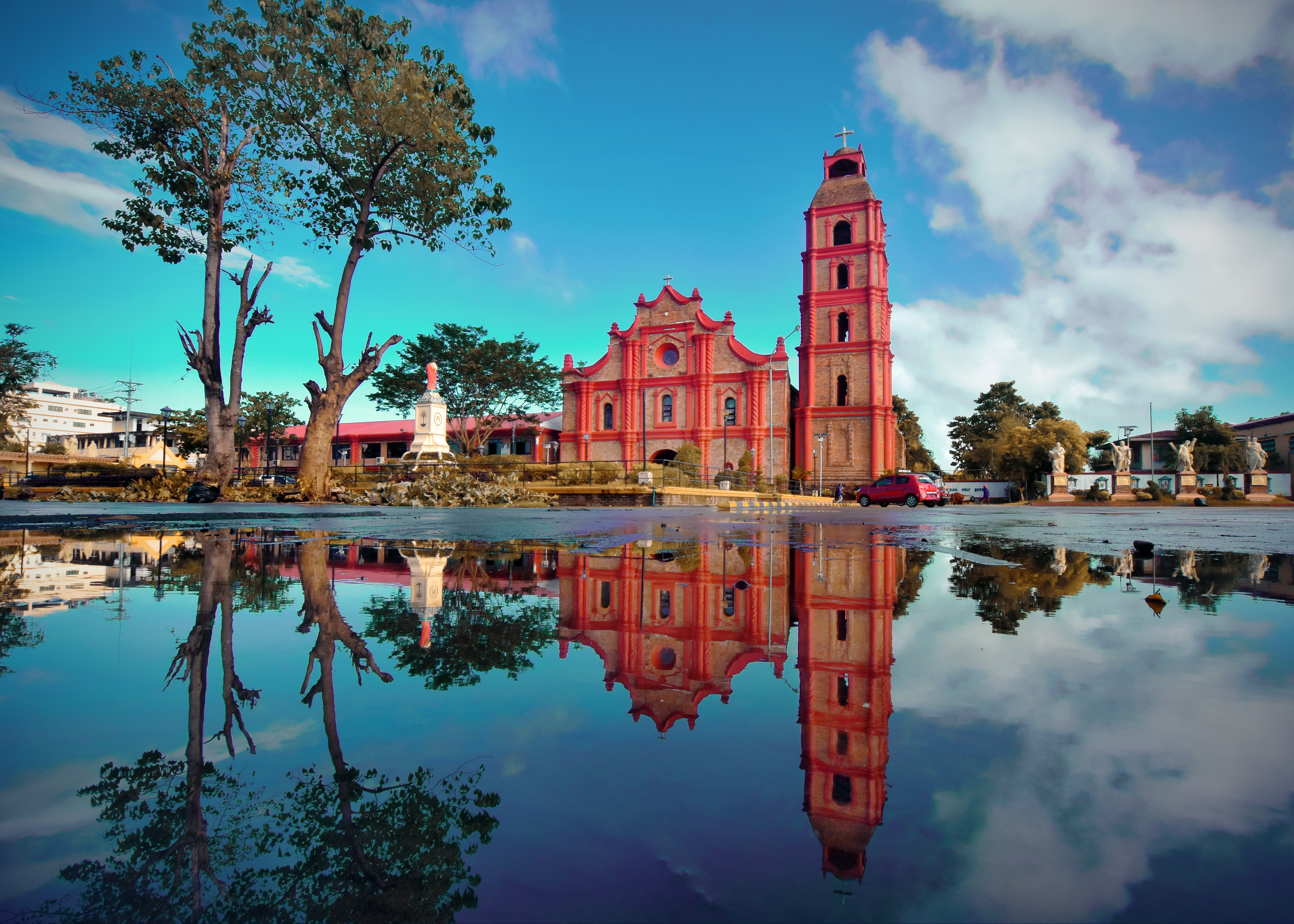
Tuguegarao Cathedral in 2017

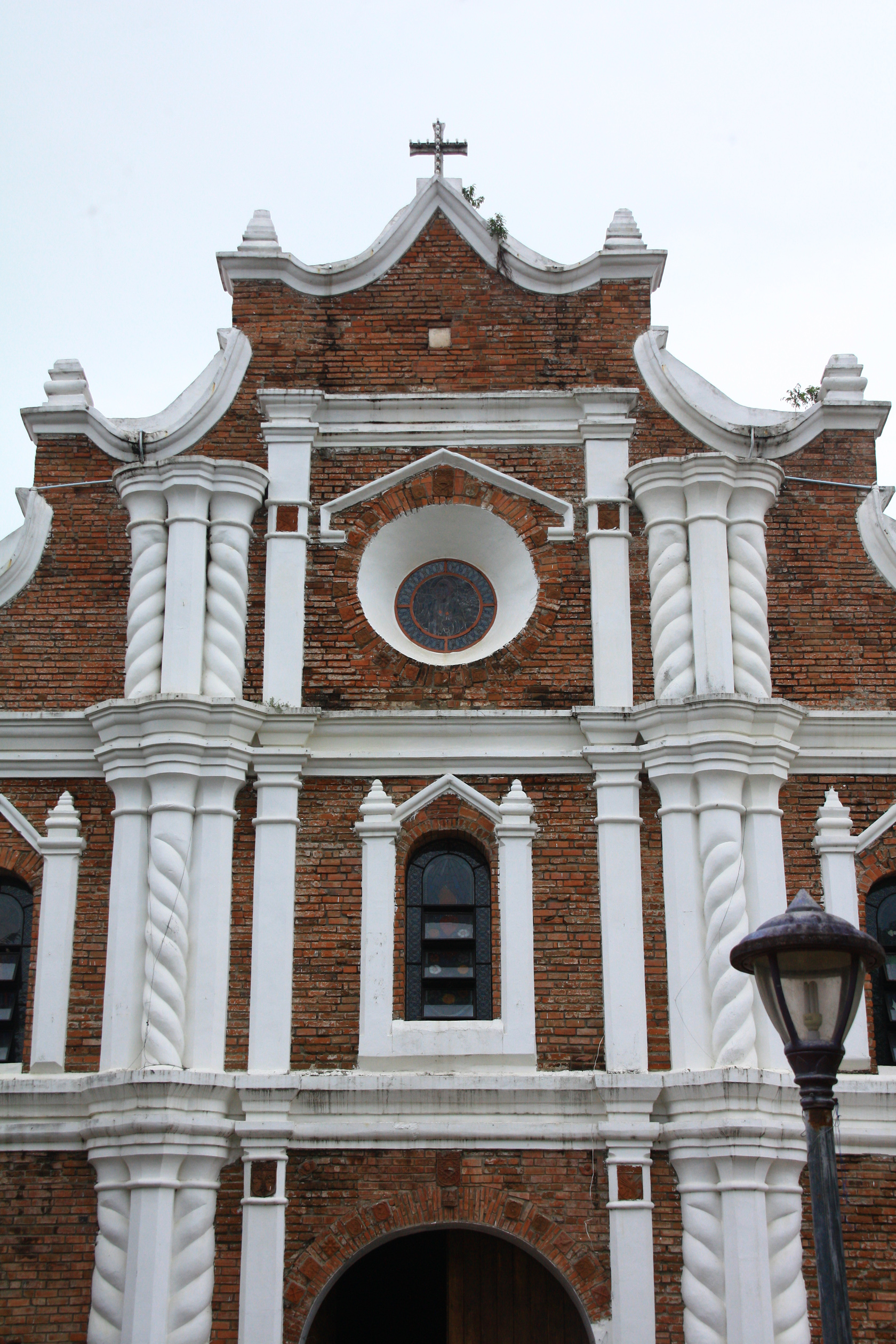
Details of the pediment and pilasters prior to the restoration

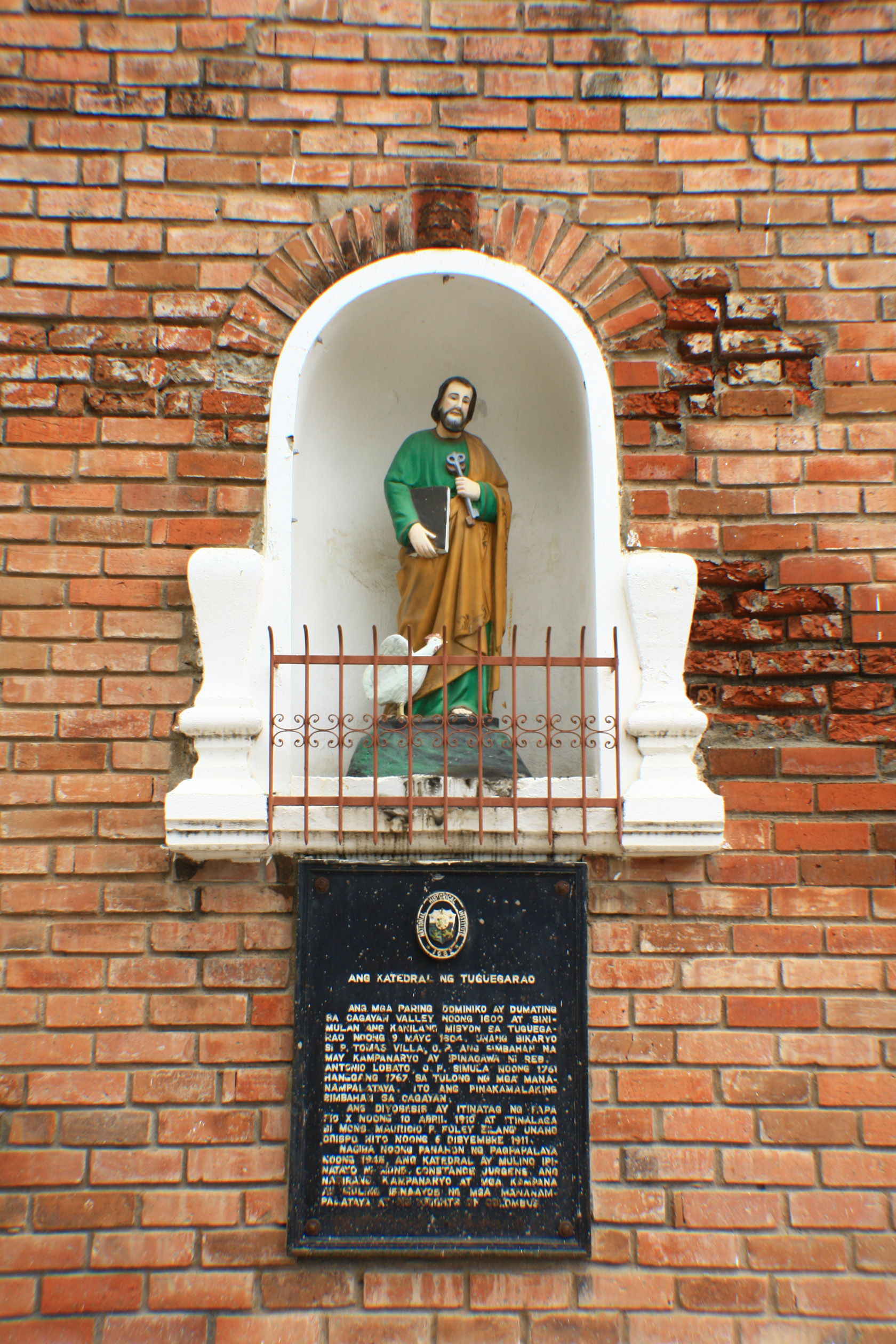
Saint's niche and National Historical Institute marker

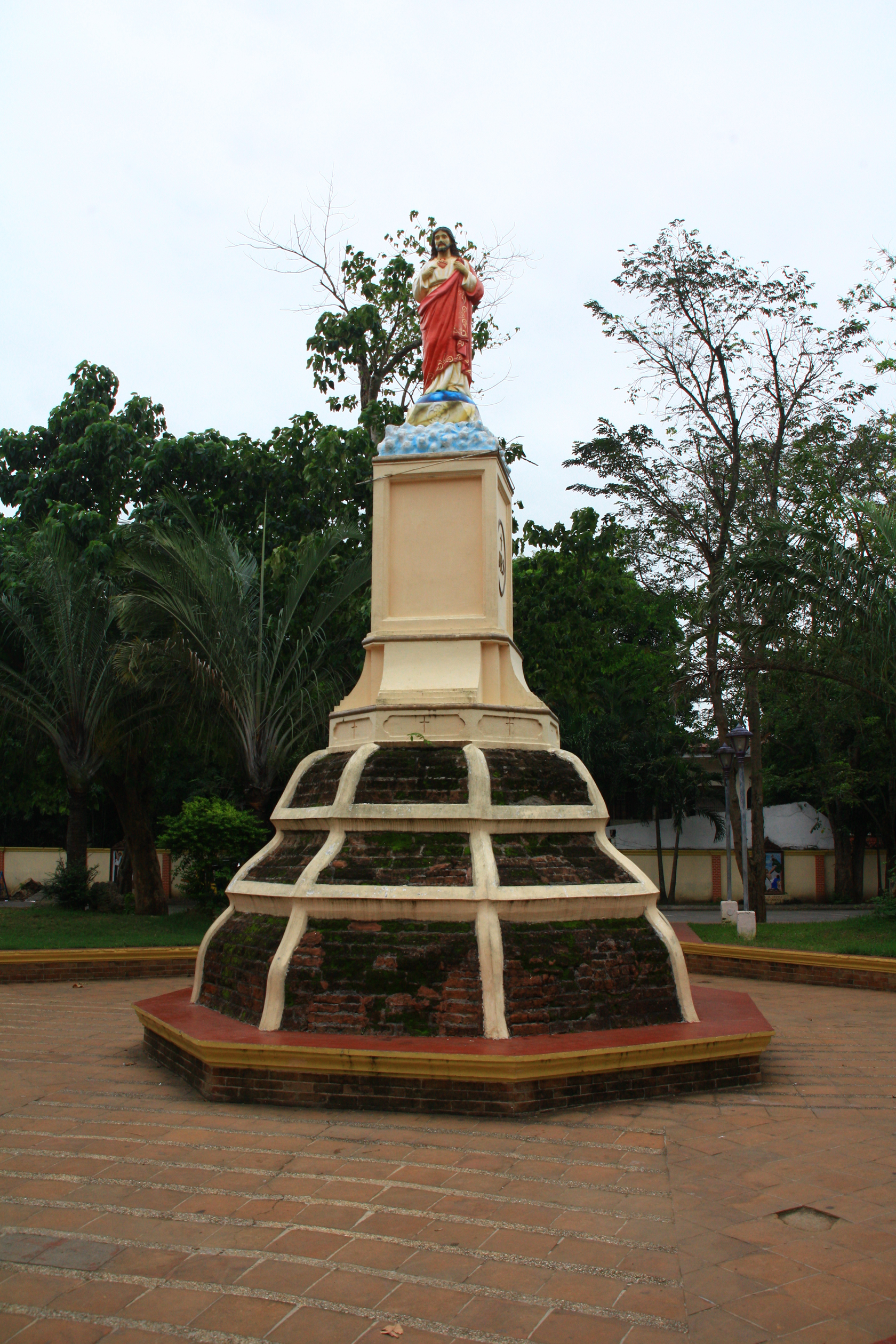
Sacred Heart of Jesus monument in front of the cathedral

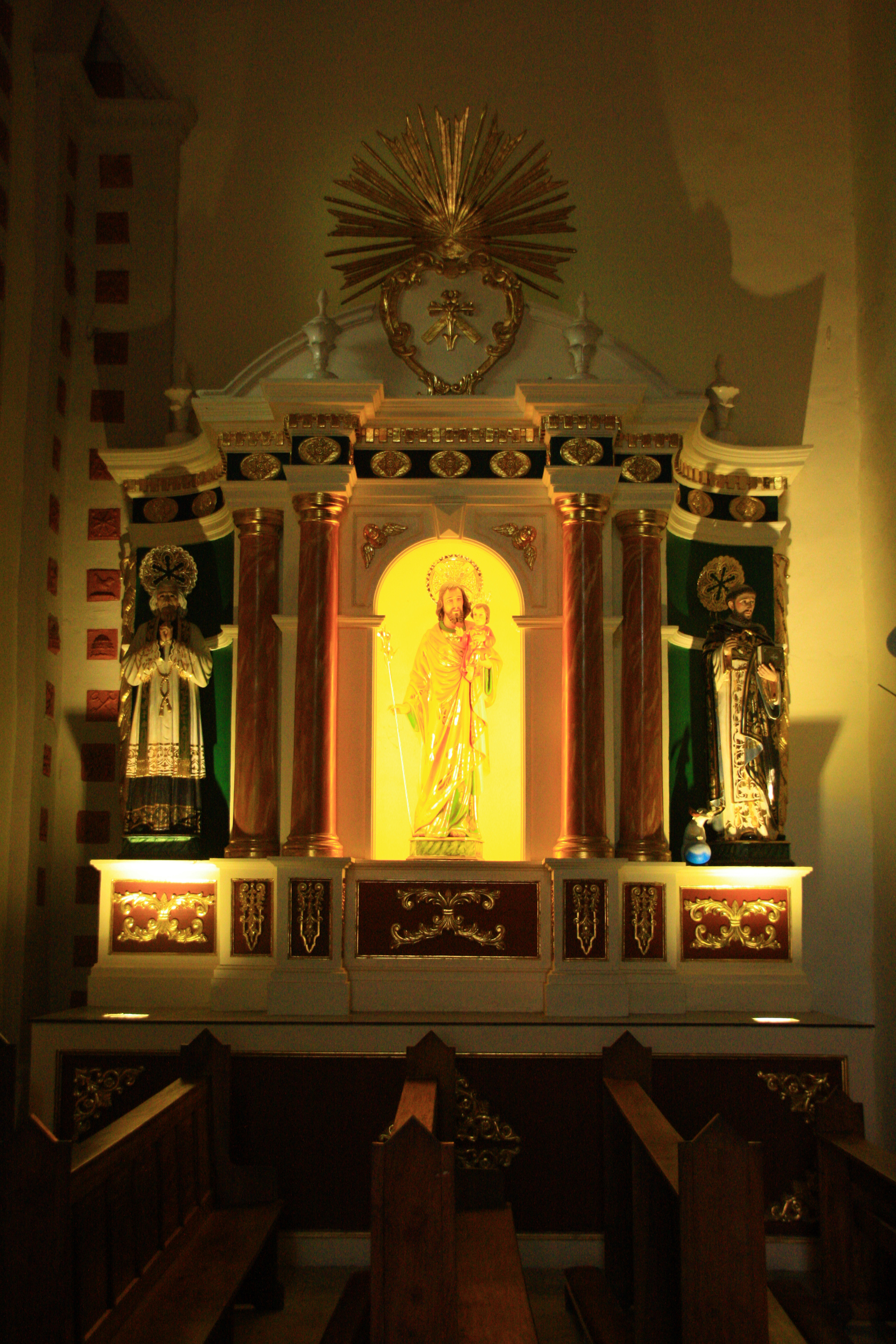
Left transept altarpiece

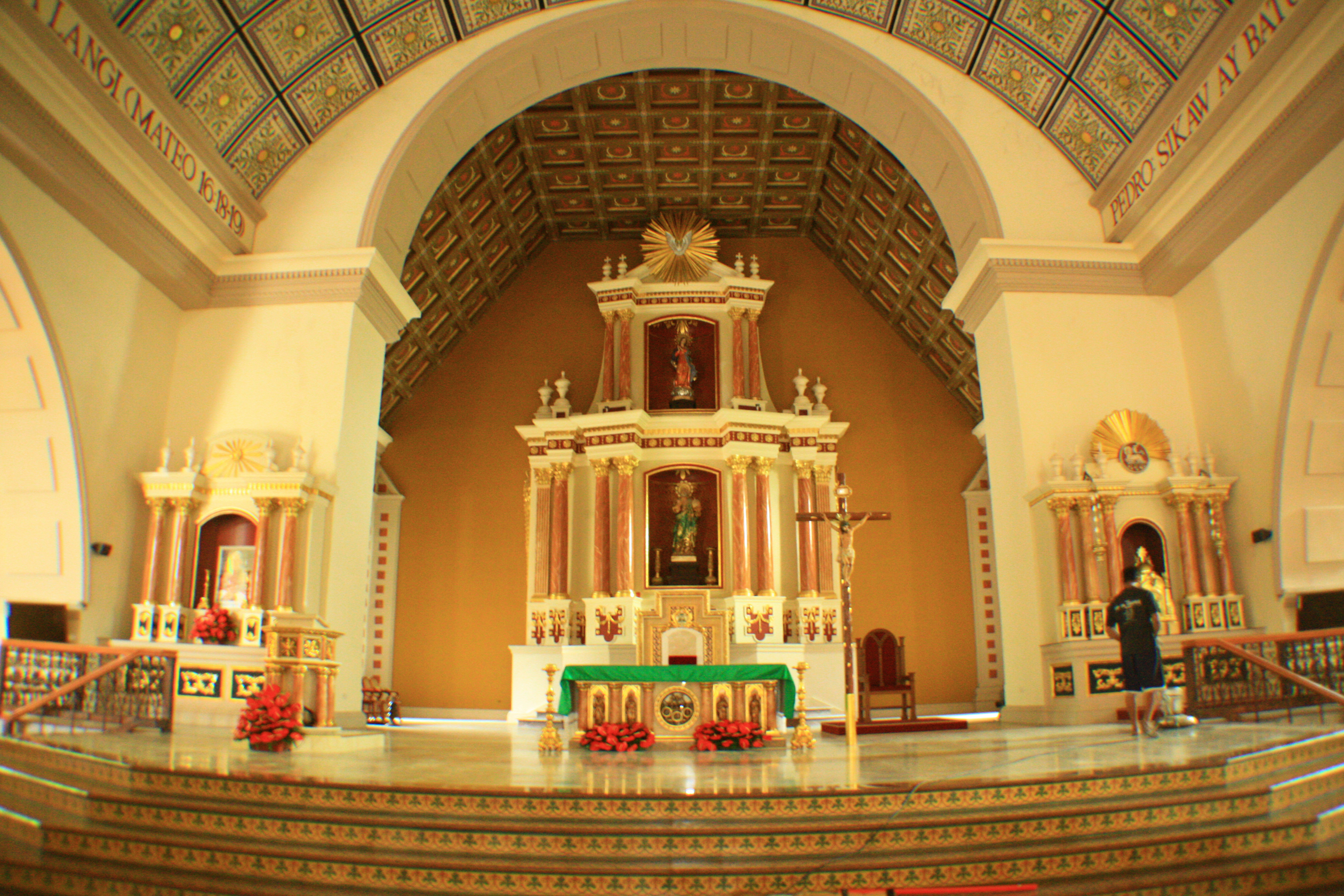
Main altarpiece

Church nave as seen from main portal

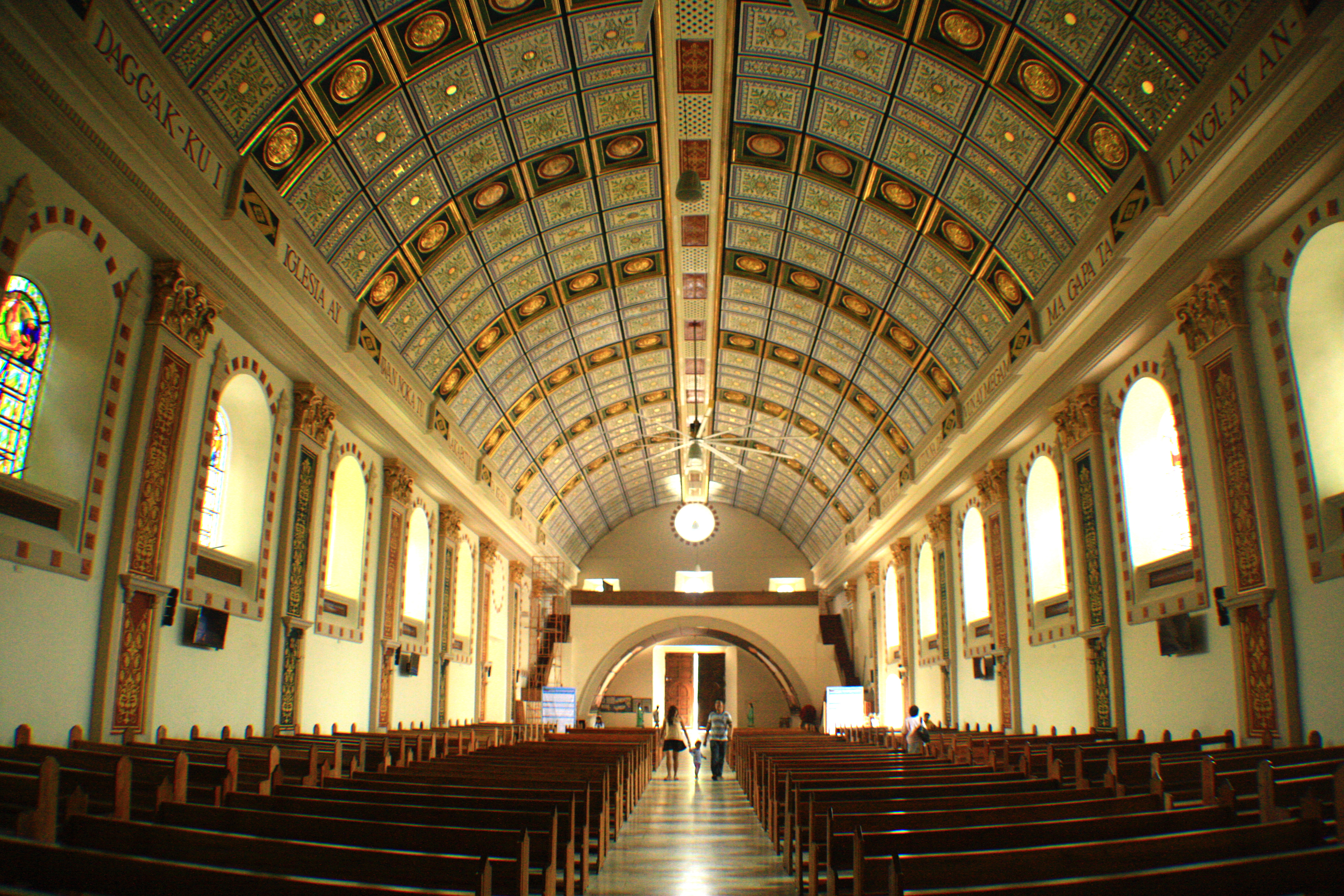
Church nave as seen from main altar

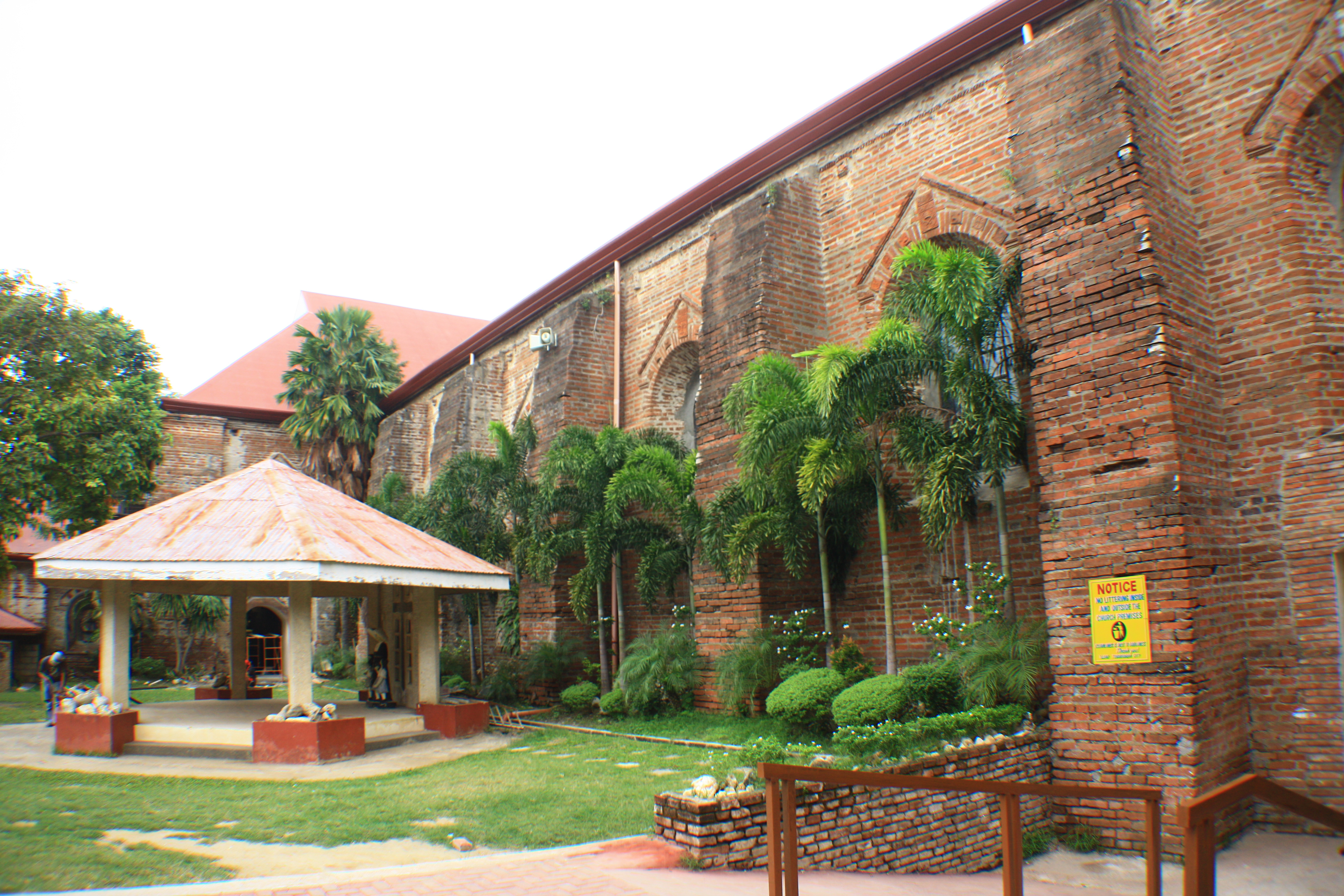
Side walls

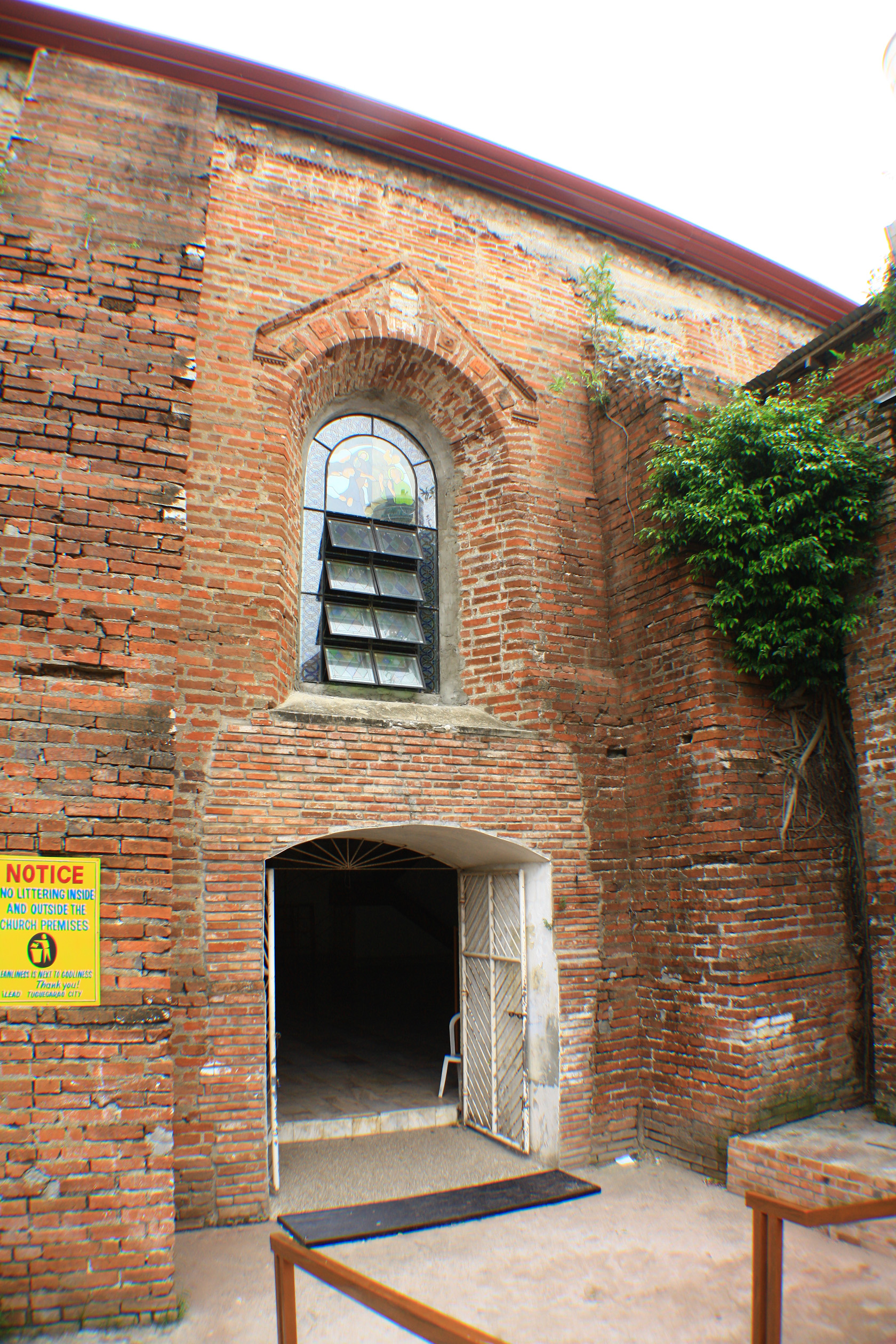
Side portal
