= San Juan de Letrán =

San Juan de Letrán (Italian: Laterno or Laterano; English: Saint John Lateran) may refer to:

- Colegio de San Juan de Letran, a college in Manila, Philippines
  - Colegio de San Juan de Letran Bataan, in Abucay, Phlippines
  - Colegio de San Juan de Letran Calamba, in Calamba, Philippines
  - Colegio de San Juan de Letran Manaoag, in Manaoag, Philippines
- San Juan de Letrán metro station, a station in Mexico City
- Archbasilica of Saint John Lateran, the cathedral church of the Diocese of Rome

== See also ==
- Lateran
