= Manaoag Church =

Roman Catholic church in Pangasinan, Philippines

- Minor Basilica of Our Lady of the Rosary of Manaoag
- Basilica Menor ng Virgen ng Santo Rosario ng Manaoag (Filipino); La Basílica Menor de Nuestra Señora del Santísimo Rosario de Manaoag (Spanish)
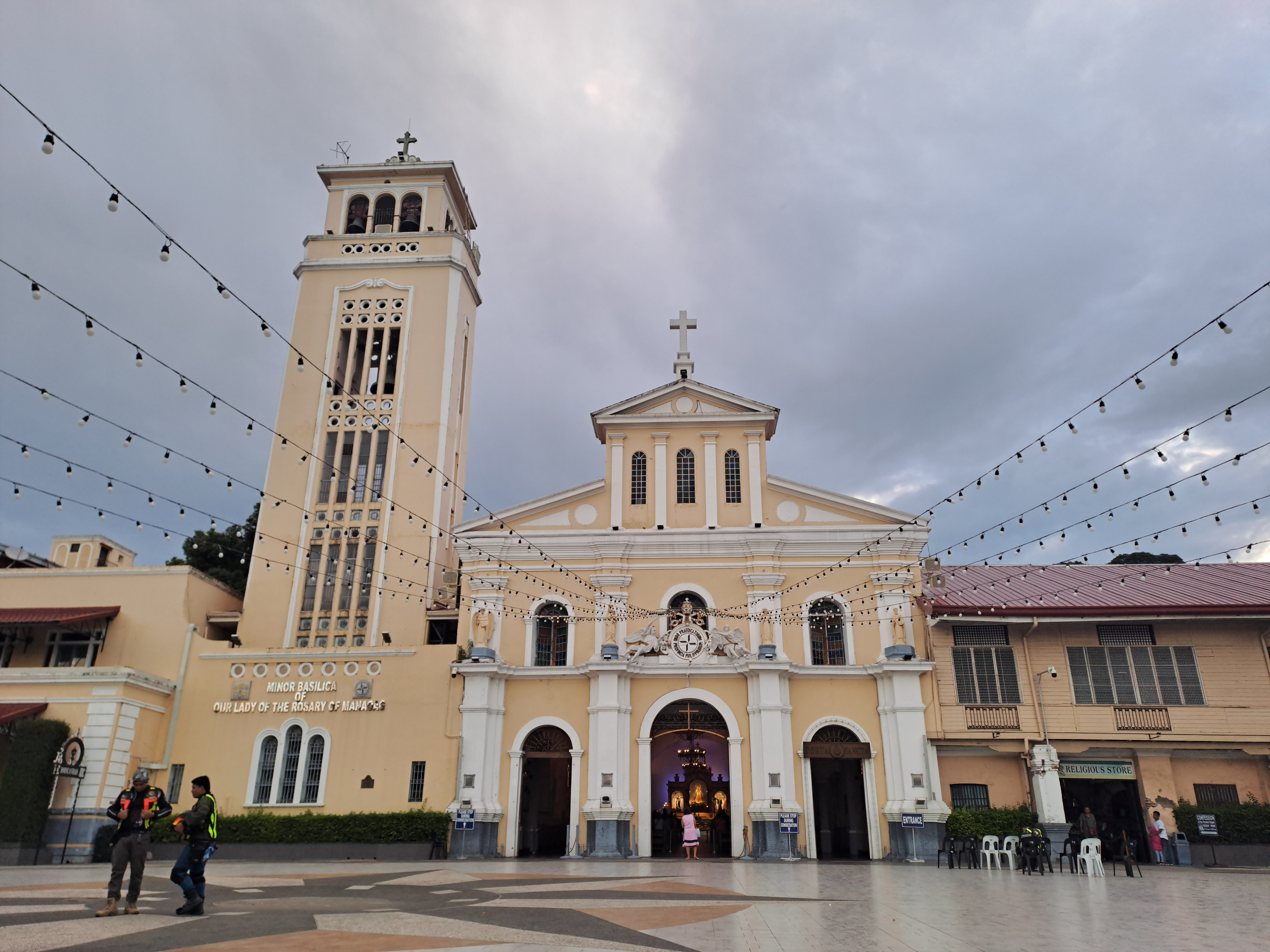
- Church facade in 2023

- Location in Luzon Location in the Philippines
- 16°02′38″N 120°29′20″E
- Location: Manaoag, Pangasinan
- Country: Philippines
- Denomination: Roman Catholic
- Religious order: Dominicans
- Website: Manaoag Minor Basilica

History
- Status: Minor Basilica
- Founded: 1600; 426 years ago
- Dedication: Our Lady of Manaoag
- Dedicated: April 21, 2026; 6 months ago (rededication)
- Events: Patronal Feast - 1st Sunday of October; Town Summer Feast - 3rd Wednesday of Easter; Dawn Rosary Procession and Mass - Every First Saturday of the Month

Architecture
- Functional status: Active
- Architectural type: Cruciform church
- Style: Neo-Romanesque
- Years built: c. 1600s (demo. c. 1700s); 1701–1720 (dst. 1892 and 1898); 1901–1912)
- Groundbreaking: 1901; 125 years ago
- Completed: 1912; 114 years ago

Specifications
- Length: 88.3 m (290 ft)
- Width: 55.9 m (183 ft)

Administration
- Archdiocese: Lingayen–Dagupan
- Deanery: St. Thomas Aquinas
- Parish: Our Lady of the Rosary

Clergy
- Rector: Felix Legaspi, III, OP
- Priest(s): Ramon T. Salibay, OP (parish priest); Romualdo Cabanatan, OP

National Historical Landmarks
- Official name: Church of Nuestra Señora de Manaoag
- Type: Buildings/Structures
- Designated: 1973; 53 years ago
- Database: NHCP website

The Minor Basilica of Our Lady of the Rosary of Manaoag, commonly known as Manaoag Church, is a Roman Catholic minor basilica located in Manaoag, Pangasinan in the Philippines. It is under the jurisdiction of the Archdiocese of Lingayen-Dagupan. The shrine is dedicated to the Blessed Virgin Mary under the title of Our Lady of the Rosary. The original shrine was founded in 1600, it is administered by the Order of Preachers and is a popular tourist and pilgrimage site among devotees due to the veneration of Our Lady of Manaoag.

Pope Benedict XVI decreed an affiliation with equal plenary indulgences for the shrine to the Basilica of Saint Mary the Great on 21 June 2011. (Note: Benedictus XVI, Papam. Prænotanda Numerorum # 433–1, I. 20 in 20 April 2011. Vatican Secret Archives) Pope Francis raised the shrine to the status of a Minor Basilica via his Pontifical decree Spiritualem Fidelium Progressionem on 11 October 2014. (Note: Franciscus, Papam. Sigillium Vaticanus, Cardinalem Pietro Parolin. Vatican Secretary of State.Vatican Secret Archives.)

== Details of the building ==
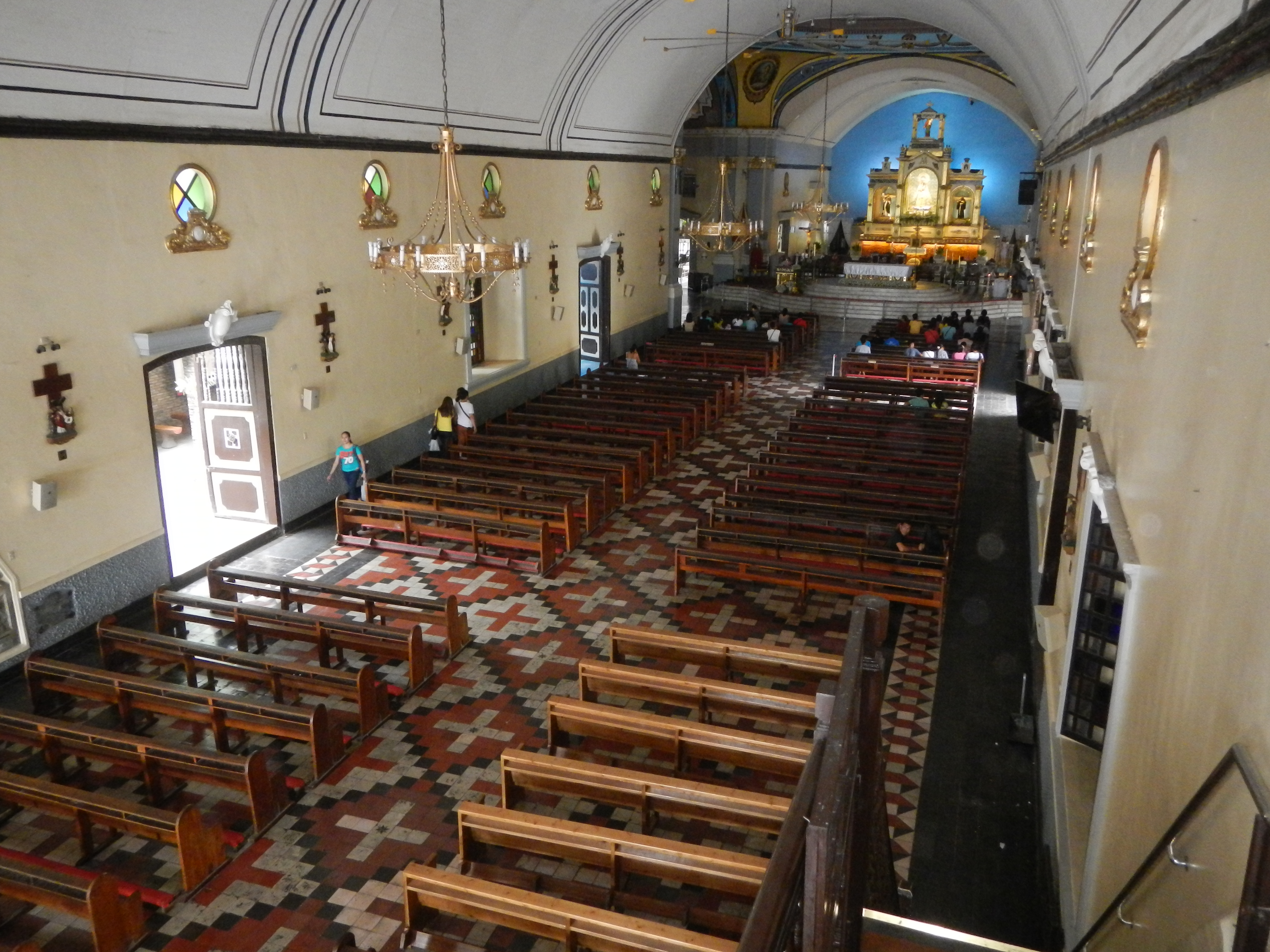
Church interior in 2016

Some of the miracles attributed to Our Lady of Manaoag are depicted in murals inside the church's transepts and nave. The Paschal chapel beside the south flank of the church has icons of the Black Nazarene, similar to that of the Quiapo Church, the Holy burial, and statues of the Virgin Mary. The sanctuary on the left side of the main entrance has a large image of the crucified Christ.

Behind the main church building are the parish office, Blessing area, Museum of Our Lady of The Rosary of Manaoag, candle gallery, Pilgrims’ Center, Dominican novitiate of the Annunciation, and Rosary garden. There is also an Information Center at the priory at the left side of the church and souvenir shops at the front office of the church, beside the veneration room at the second floor behind the main sanctuary, and at the candle gallery in the space behind of the church.

== History ==
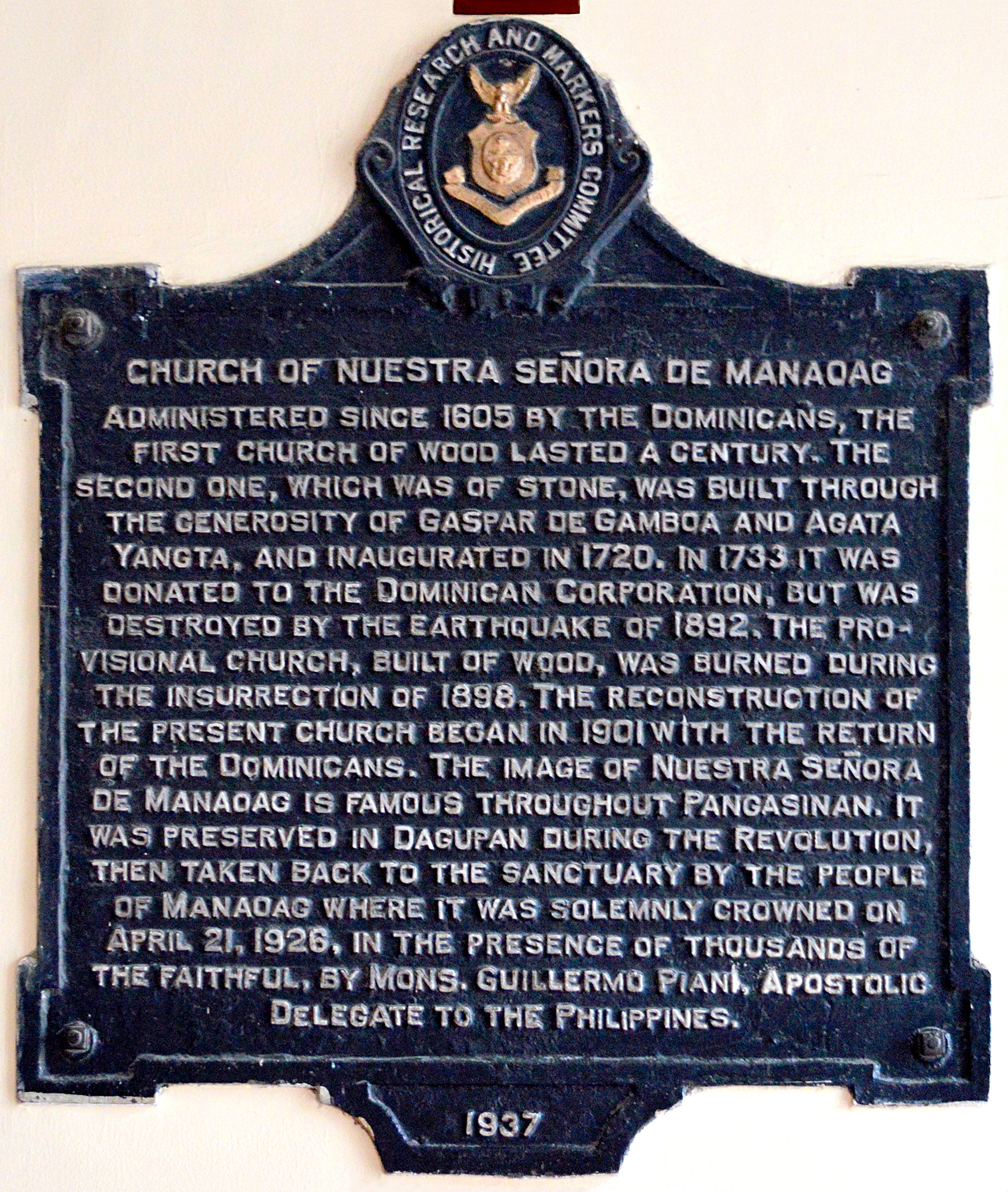
Church HRMC historical marker installed in 1937

The Augustinians built the first chapel of Santa Monica (the original name of Manaoag) in 1600, at the site of the present graveyard. It was served by the friars from the town of Lingayen, who were succeeded by the Dominicans in 1605 and served from the town of Mangaldan.

The first Dominican priest to work in the Manaoag mission was Juan de San Jacinto, who was the first curate of Mangaldan. It was only in 1608 that the Mangaldan mission was formally accepted by the provincial chapter of the Dominicans. In 1610, Tomás Jiménez, OP became the Manaoag mission's first resident priest.

Numerous threats from the Igorot tribes of the surrounding mountains led to the transfer of the entire community to the present site on a hill. The Dominicans started to build a large church on its present site in 1701 under the sponsorship of Gaspar de Gamboa and his wife, Agata Yangta, who were wealthy residents from Manila who moved to Lingayen. Later expansion of the church from 1882 was frustrated by an earthquake in 1892.

During the tumult of the Philippine Revolution for independence from Spain, revolutionaries set fire to the church, its treasures, ornaments, and records on May 10, 1898. The image narrowly escaped destruction; it was found abandoned at the back of the church. It was spirited away to Dagupan, where it was kept from June to October 1898.

The Dominicans returned in 1901 upon the invitation of Rev. Mariano Pacis, the diocesan priest of Manaoag. Under the aegis of the Dominicans, the church that was started in 1882 was finally completed to a large extent in 1911–12. The central retablo, incorporating Baroque columns from the 18th-century altar, was completed by the famed Tampinco Atelier of Manila. The transepts were completed in 1931–32.

The Dominicans ceded all their Pangasinan missions to the diocesan clergy except Manaoag. Spiritual administration of the shrine in perpetuity was granted by the Holy See to the Order of Preachers in 1925.

A huge crowd attended the canonical coronation of the image on April 21, 1926, by the Apostolic Delegate to the Philippines Guglielmo Piani, SDB, as authorized by Pope Pius XI. This meant that the Catholic Church officially recognized and proclaimed that the Virgin Mary acclaimed as Our Lady of the Rosary of Manaoag had granted favors and blessings to or formidable intercessions for her devotees through the centuries.

The church was rebuilt after surviving Japanese bombardment during the Second World War. The old convent is now the present Colegio de San Juan de Letran Manaoag, founded as Holy Rosary Academy in 1947 by the last Spanish Dominican in Manaoag, Rev. Teodulo Cajigal, OP.

Since December 8, 1972, the Shrine of Our Lady of the Rosary of Manaoag has been under the Philippine Dominican Province. It celebrated the diamond jubilee of the image's canonical coronation on January 1, 2000.

=== Contemporary history ===
Pope Benedict XVI issued a Pontifical decree via the former Archpriest of the Basilica of Saint Mary Major, Cardinal Bernard Francis Law on June 21, 2011, which canonically approved the granting of a "special bond of spiritual affinity in perpetuity" through which the pilgrims are assured of the same blessings and entitlement to a plenary indulgence equal to that received when visiting a papal basilica in Rome.

This decree was confirmed by Archbishop Socrates B. Villegas on June 13, 2011. The Manaoag shrine is the first to achieve this status followed by the Archdiocesan Shrine of Our Lady of Caysasay in Taal, Batangas in June 2012. The official document and a shrine official, who was among the priests who went to Rome, confirmed that a plenary indulgence (of a maximum of one per day) may be obtained on each visit to the Shrine in a spirit of detachment from the attraction of sin subject to three conditions for each occasion: going to confession immediately before or after the pilgrimage; attending a Mass and receiving the Eucharist during the pilgrimage; and praying for the intentions of the Pope at the Shrine.

A petition to elevate the shrine to a minor basilica was sent on August 15, 2014, the Feast of the Assumption of Mary. On October 11, 2014, Pope Francis granted the petition elevating the shrine as a minor basilica. The shrine was solemnly declared a minor basilica on February 17, 2015.

On April 22, 2026, the church celebrated the centennial anniversary of the Pontifical coronation of the image of Nuestra Señora del Santísimo Rosario de Manaoag.

== Access and transportation ==
The Minor Basilica of Our Lady of the Rosary of Manaoag is located approximately 200 kilometers (120 mi) north of Manila.

From Metro Manila, Manaoag is accessible via North Luzon Expressway, MacArthur Highway and Tarlac–Pangasinan–La Union Expressway via the Binalonan Exit and westward to nearby Manaoag; or through Urdaneta City, Pangasinan, then heading northwest via the Urdaneta-Manaoag Road, or through Binalonan via the Binalonan-Manaoag-Mangaldan Road. The basilica is four to five hours by bus from Cubao, Quezon City.

== Gallery ==
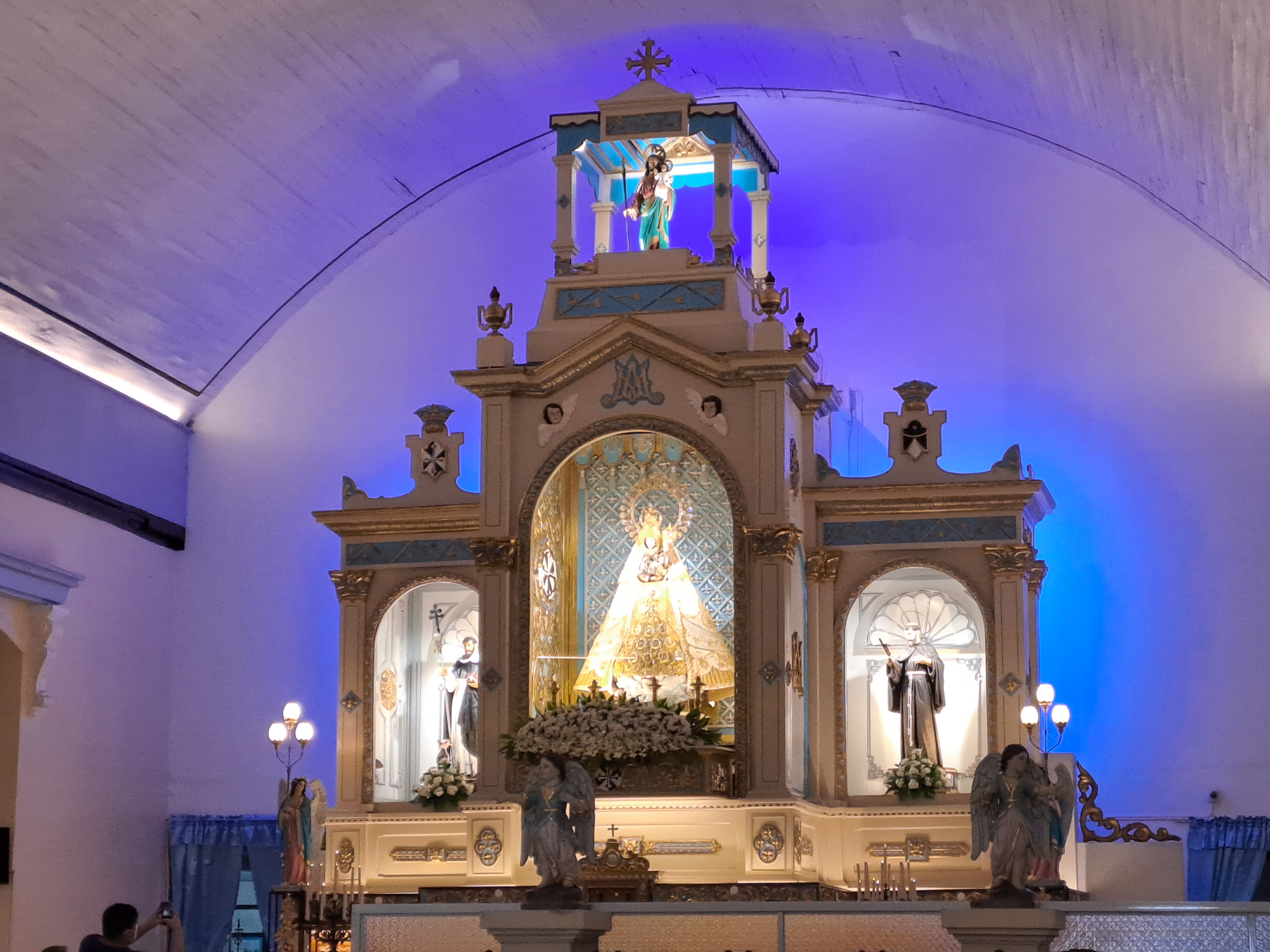
The reredos of the shrine's main altar

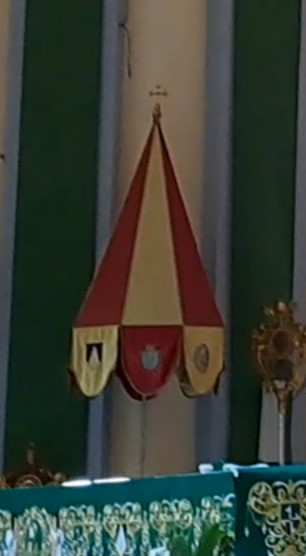
The conopaeum, a common feature among minor basilicas

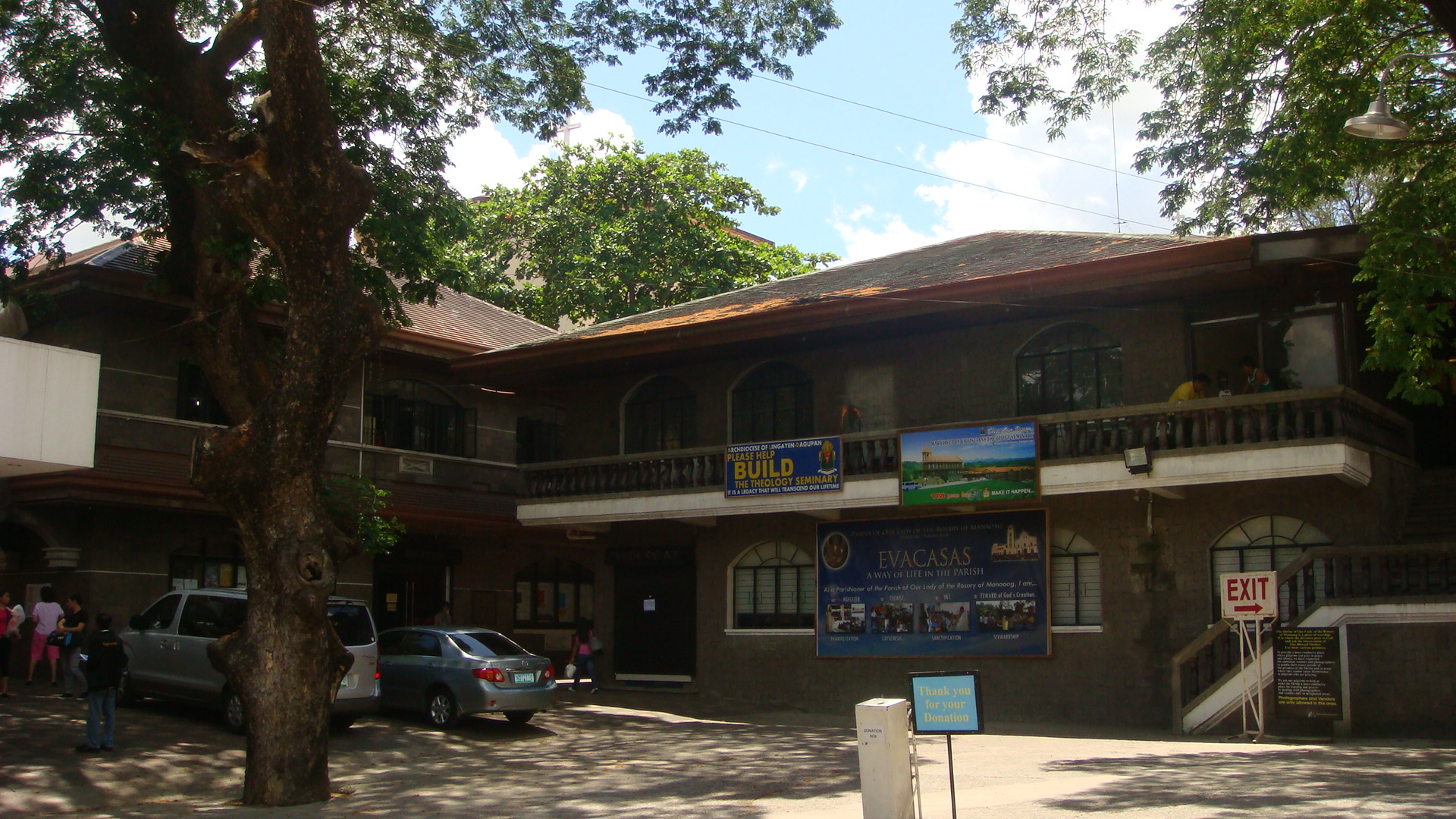
Museum and Parish Offices

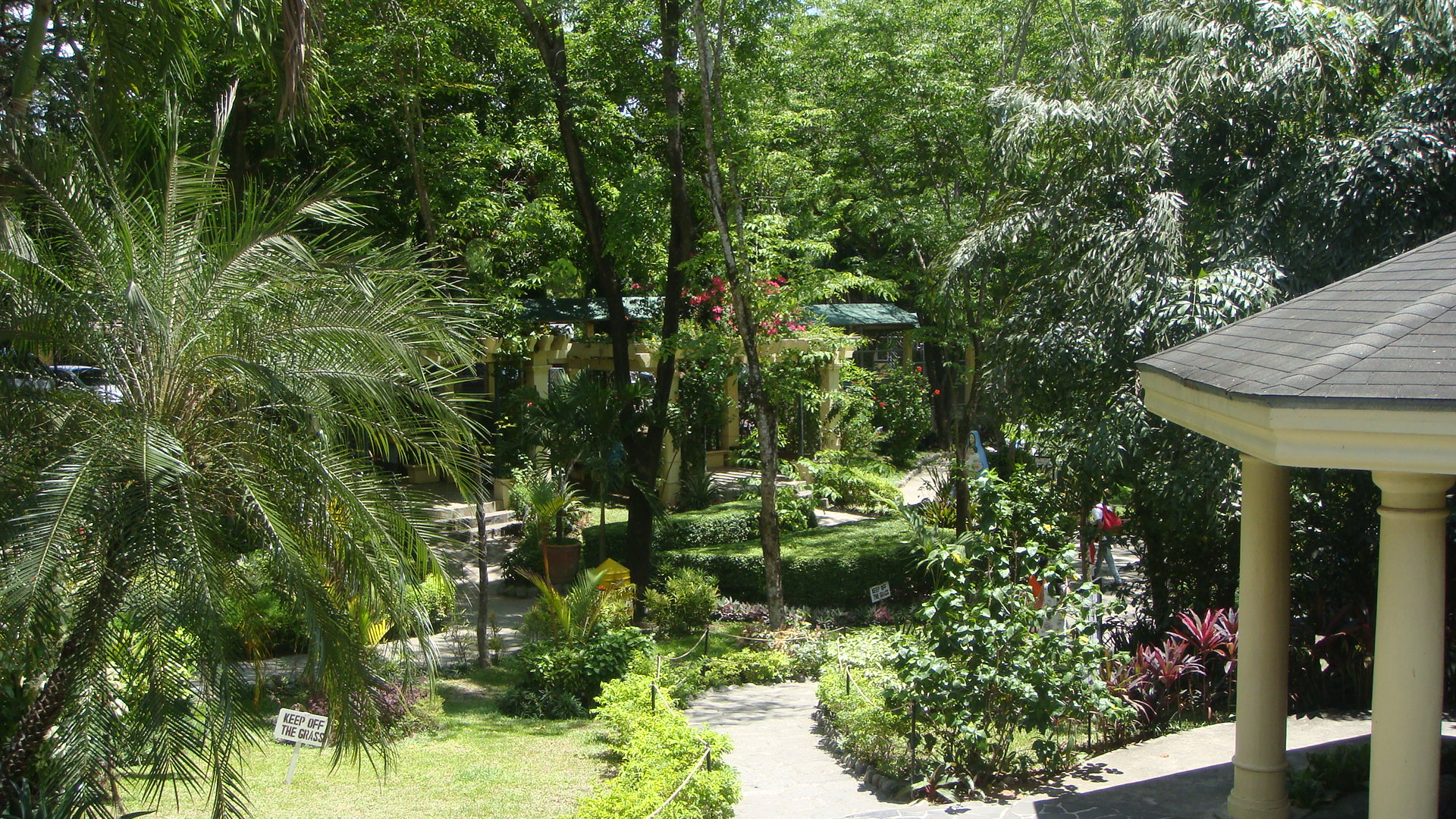
Rosary Garden

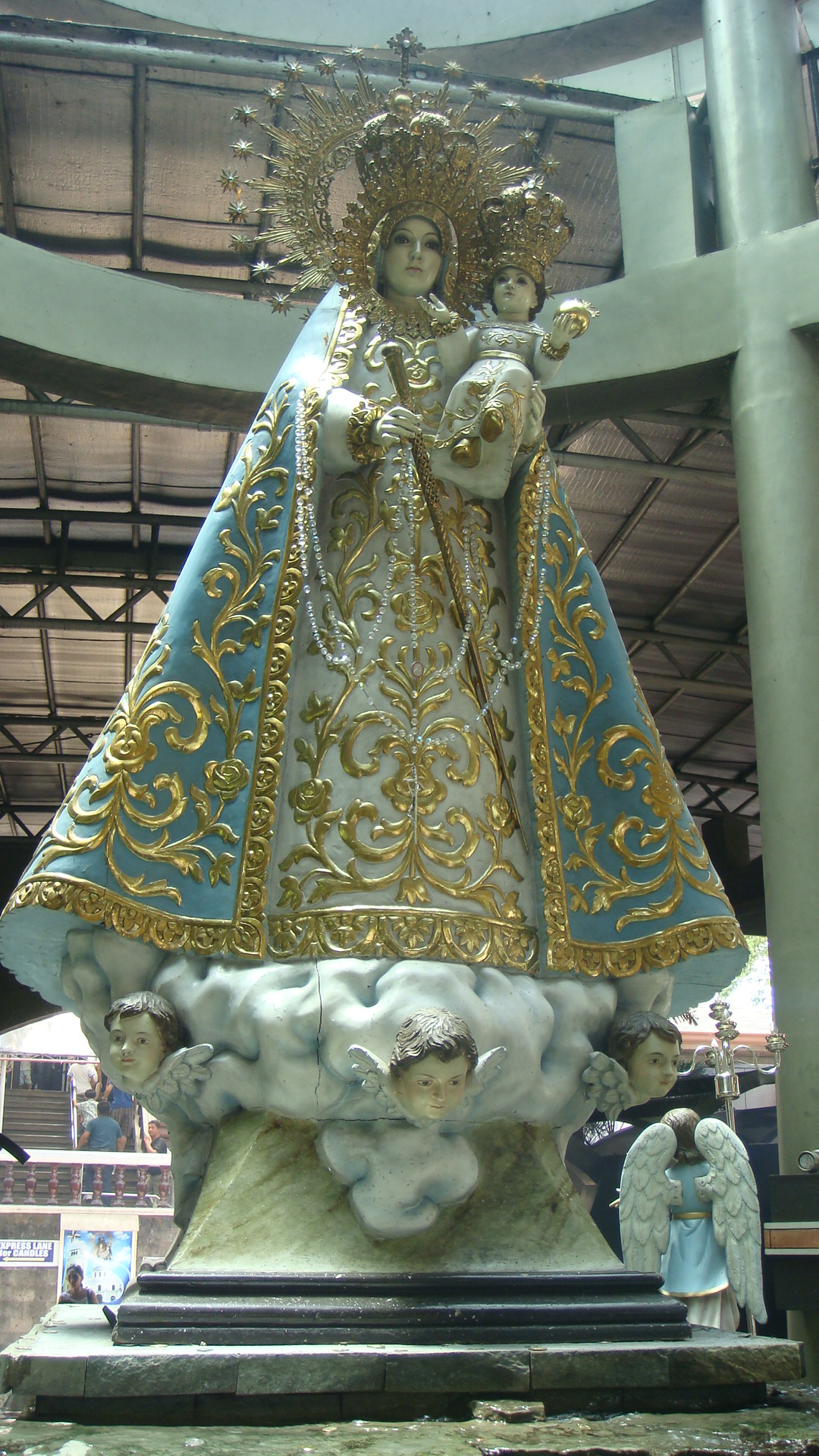
Our Lady of Manaoag at the Virgin's Wishing Well in the candle-lighting pavilion

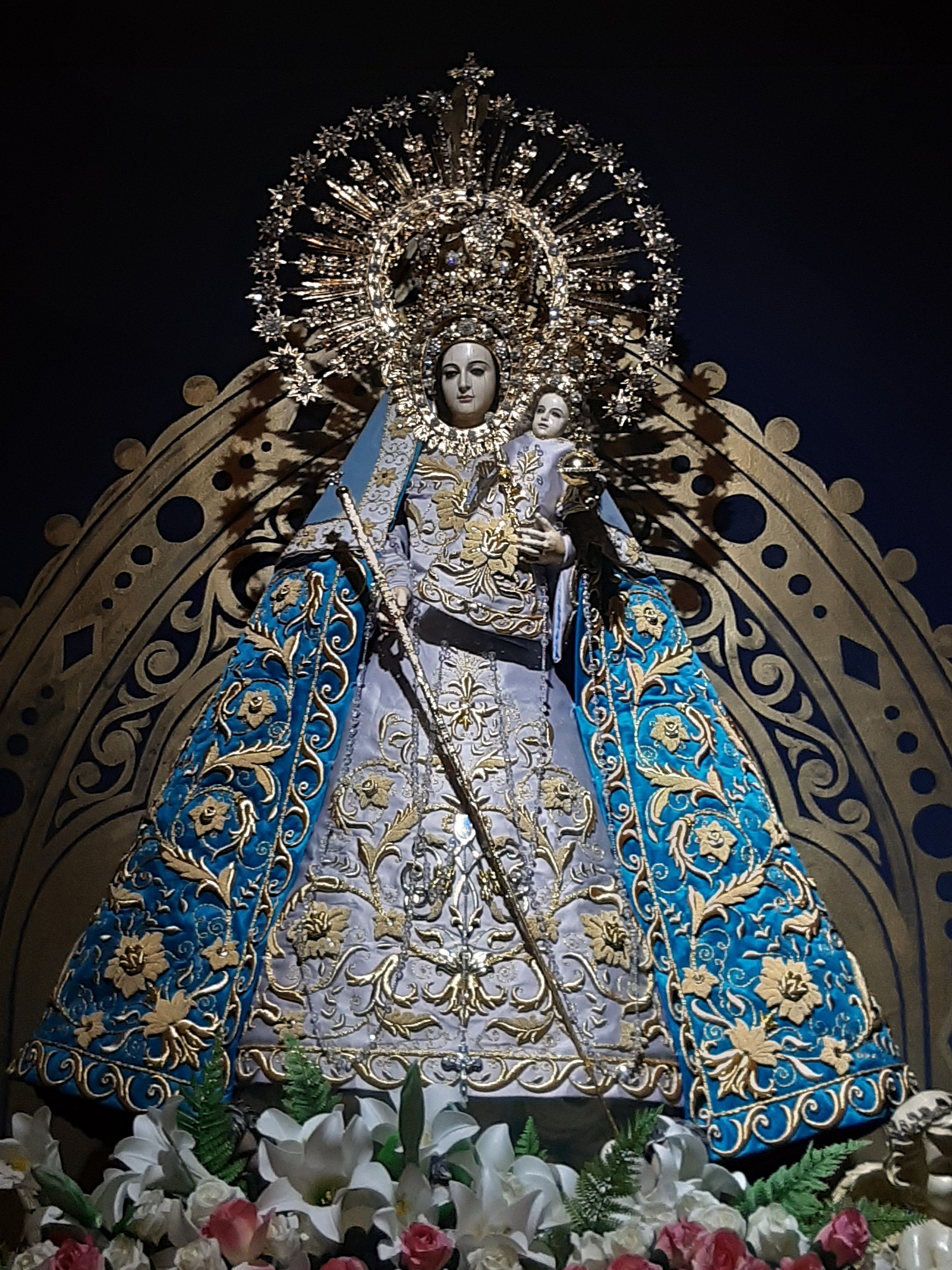
An antique ivory replica of Our Lady of Manaoag exhibited in the basilica museum

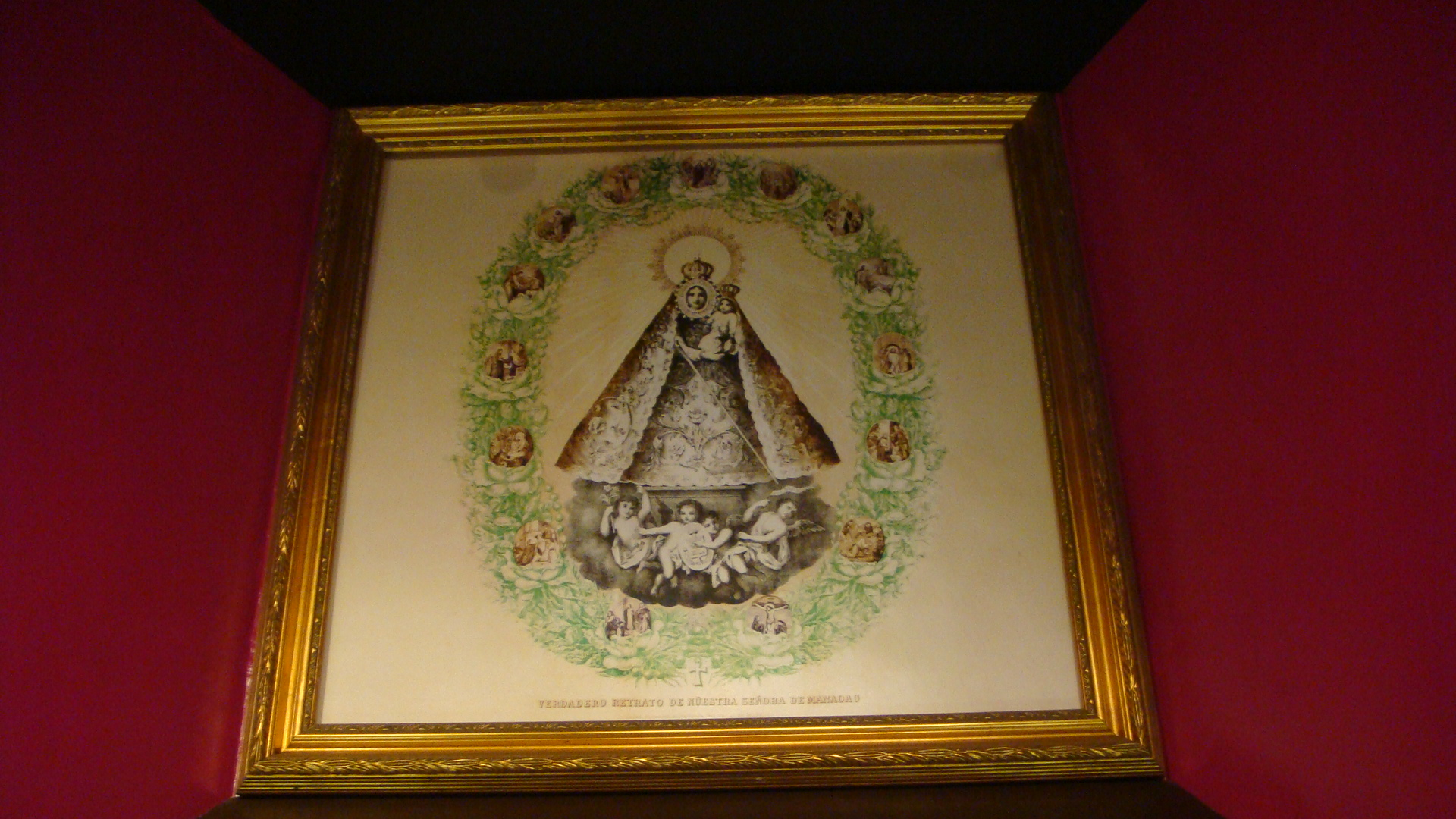
A lithograph of Our Lady in the museum, c. 1870
