= Colegio de San Juan de Letran Manaoag =

Roman Catholic college in Pangasinan, Philippines

- Dalubhasaan ng San Juan de Letran Manaoag (Filipino)
- Former names: Holy Rosary Academy of Manaoag (1947–2001); Our Lady of Manaoag College (2001–2014)
- Motto: Deus, Patria, Letran (Latin)
- Motto in English: God, Fatherland, Letran
- Type: Private non-profit Basic and Higher education institution
- Established: 1947; 79 years ago
- Religious affiliation: Roman Catholic (Dominican)
- Academic affiliations: CEAP
- Chancellor: Very Rev. Fr. Gerard Timoner III, OP, SThL
- Rector: Rev. Fr. Jessie R. Yap, OP, EHL
- Location: Castro St. Poblacion, Manaoag, Pangasinan, Philippines; 16°02′36″N 120°29′20″E
- Campus: Suburban
- Alma Mater song: Himno del Colegio de Letran
- Patron Saint: St. John the Baptist
- Colors: Blue & red
- Nickname: Letran Knights
- Sporting affiliations: R1AA
- Website: letran-manaoag.edu.ph

The Colegio de San Juan de Letran Manaoag (CSJL Manaoag; Filipino: Dalubhasaan ng San Juan de Letran Manaoag), or simply Letran Manaoag, is a private Catholic coeducational basic and higher education institution owned and run by the friars of the Order of Preachers in Manaoag, Pangasinan, Philippines.

The former Our Lady of Manaoag College, located within meters from the Manaoag Church, Colegio de San Juan de Letran Manaoag is the latest institution integrated into the Letran system.

== History ==
The Holy Rosary Academy of Manaoag was founded in 1947 by Fr. Teodulo Cajigal, O.P., a Spanish Dominican priest. The institution started only as an elementary school. However, when another building was completed in 1949, a complete high school course offering was made possible. The government granted the school official recognition in 1951. In 1952, the first high school commencement exercises were held.

The convent of the Dominican Fathers was initially located within the school campus. In 1954, when a new building was completed at the opposite side of the Church, the Convent of the Dominican Fathers was relocated there. The vacancy of the former convent made possible the segregation of the high school building while the latter began to hold their classes in the vacated building.

Both schools were managed for a decade by Franciscan Sisters of the Immaculate Conception assisted by a staff of lay teachers. The Dominican Fathers helped in the teaching of religion and in the religious activities. When the contract with the Franciscan Sisters expired in 1975, the Dominican Daughters of the Immaculate Mother (DDIM) took over the administration of the school. After a year, the DDIM Sisters adopted for the school a non-graded, open system of education patterned after the Angelicum School of Quezon City, another institution run by the Dominican Fathers.

In 2001, the school was granted permit by the Commission on Higher Education to offer undergraduate education. The school then operated under the name Our Lady of Manaoag College.

On August 8, 2014, Our Lady of Manaoag College signed a Memorandum of Agreement with Letran Manila, Letran Calamba, and Letran Bataan for the integration of the college into the Letran System. A proposal of changing its name to Colegio de San Juan de Letran Manaoag was unanimously approved by its Board of Trustees on September 6, 2014.

On October 3, 2014, the Our Lady of Manaoag College was officially relaunched as the Colegio de San Juan de Letran Manaoag. The newest Letran campus then held a celebration of the formal reopening under the banner of the Letran system.

In 2021, the newly-built senior high school building was inaugurated and blessed. It was named as the St. Vicente Liem de la Paz Building. A replica statue of Saint Vicente Liem de la Paz was also erected, given by the administration of Letran Manila.

On August 24, 2023, Rev. Fr. Jessie R. Yap, O.P. was installed as the 8th rector and president of Letran Manaoag.

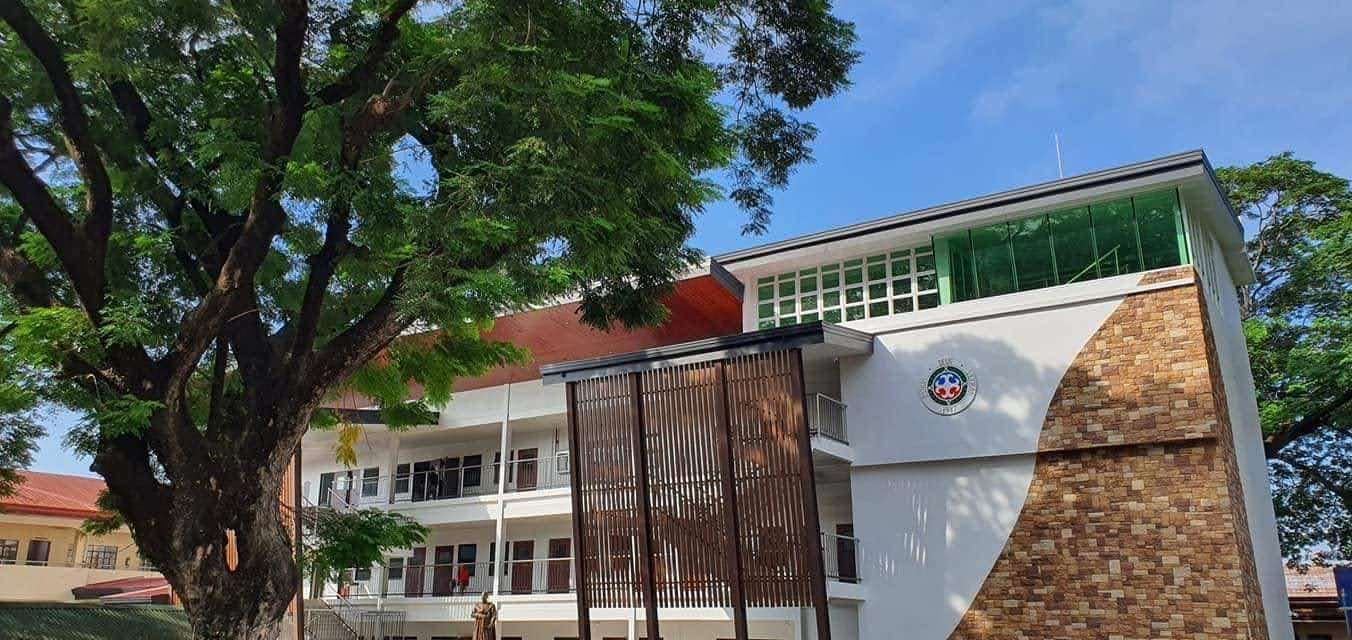
St. Vicente Liem de la Paz Building, inaugurated in A.Y. 2021–2022
