= Our Lady of Manaoag =

Venerated image of the Virgin Mary in Manaoag

Coordinates: 16°2′38.5″N 120°29′19″E

Our Lady of the Most Holy Rosary of Manaoag
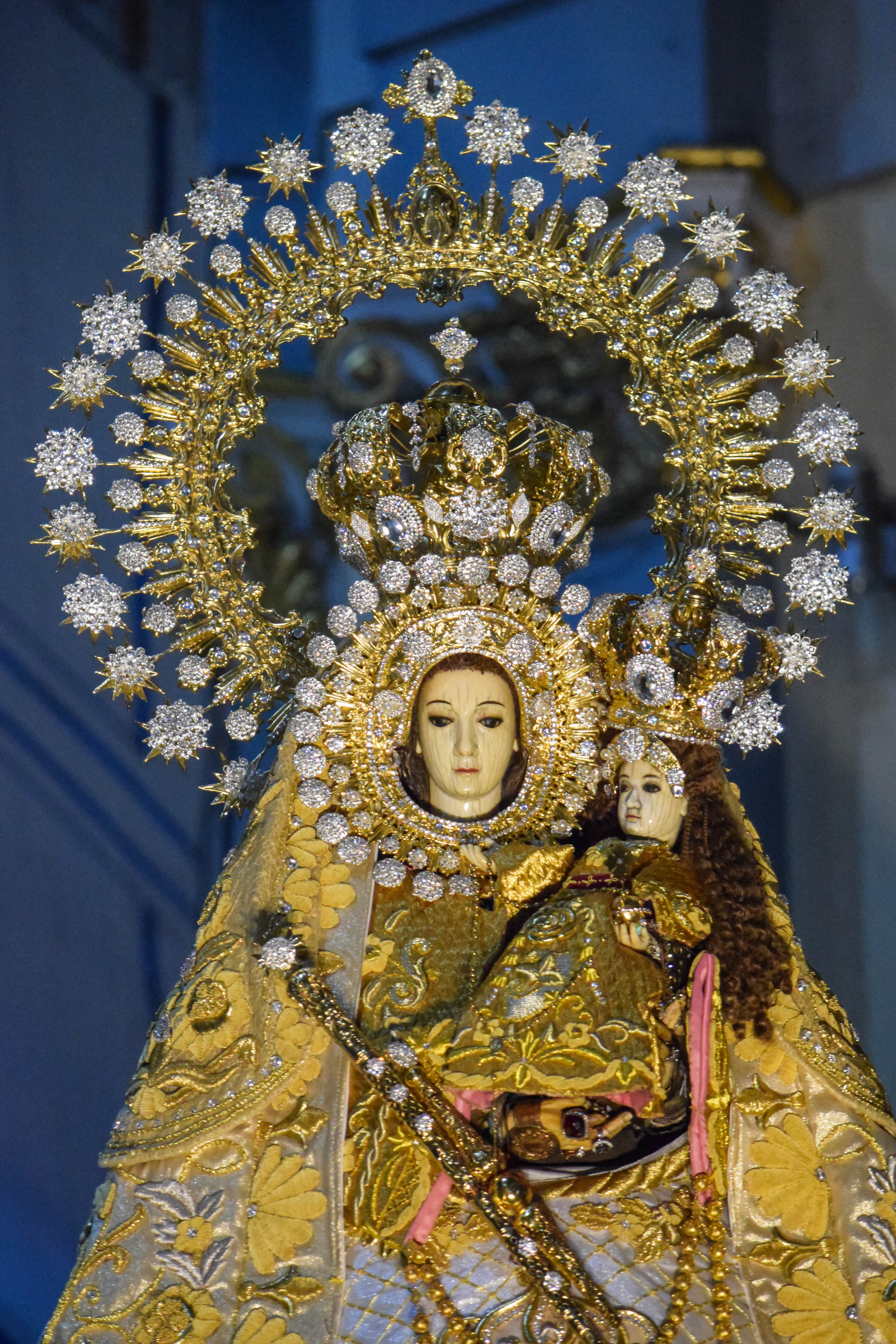
- Location: Manaoag, Pangasinan, Philippines
- Date: 1610
- Witness: Juan de la Cruz (Hagiography)
- Type: Marian apparition
- Approval: Pope Pius XI; Pope Benedict XVI; Pope Francis
- Venerated in: Roman Catholic Church
- Shrine: Minor Basilica of Our Lady of the Rosary of Manaoag
- Patronage: Manaoag, Pangasinan

Our Lady of the Most Holy Rosary of Manaoag, colloquially called as Our Lady of Manaoag (Latin: Nostra Domina de Sacratissimi Rosarii de Manaoagensis), is an image of the Blessed Virgin Mary venerated in Manaoag, the Philippines. The statue is believed to be miraculous and is locally referred to as Apo Baket (Ilocano, "Noble Mistress").

The ivory, wood, and silver image of the Madonna and Child dates to the sixteenth century. It is enshrined within its minor basilica, which is a major pilgrimage site in the country and administered by the Order of Preachers.

Pope Pius XI granted a Pontifical decree of canonical coronation titled Sanctissimus Dominus Noster on 25 August 1925. The Papal nuncio, Archbishop Guglielmo Piani celebrated the rite of coronation on 21 April 1926.

Pope Benedict XVI later granted the shrine spiritual affinity to the Basilica of Saint Mary Major on 21 June 2011. Pope Francis further elevated the shrine to the rank of a Minor Basilica via his Pontifical decree Spiritualem Fidelium Progressionem on 11 October 2014. (Note: Franciscus, Papam. Sigillium Vaticanus, Cardinalem Pietro Parolin. Vatican Secretary of State. Vatican Secret Archives.) The image has two annual feasts: the third Wednesday in Eastertide, and the first Sunday of October.

== Etymology ==
Tradition holds the town of Manaoag was derived from the Pangasinense verb mantaoag, which means "to call" (from the root taoag, "call").

== Historicity ==
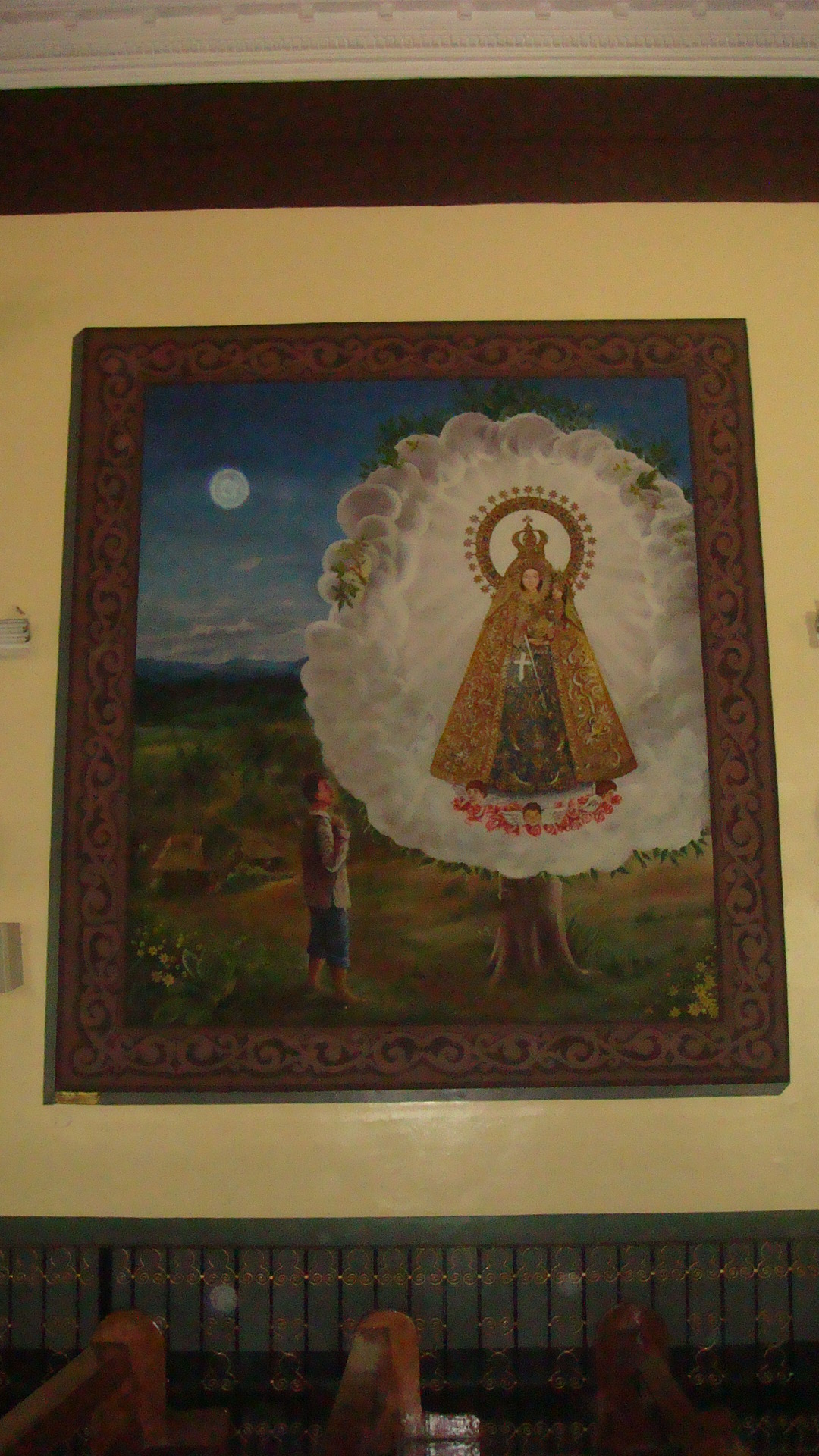
The purported Marian apparition to the farmer, depicted on a mural in the transept.

The original statue is a 17th-century ivory and silver image of the Madonna and Child enshrined at the high altar of the Basilica. It was brought to the Philippines from Spain via the Manila galleon trade from Acapulco, Mexico, in the early 17th century by the Catholic priest Juan de San Jacinto.

Accordingly, the ivory material used for the image is attested to be of subpar quality, resulting in the cracks of the image over the centuries as compared to other notable ivory images of higher quality in the Philippines. Nevertheless, the image receives much financial patronage and support which sustains its devotion, regalia and festivities. The statue has a full structured body carved in the round, with a slightly bent neck and nape symbolising the Virgin’s maternal embrace and piety. The original image was eventually enlarged and covered by an embroidered cape and skirt.

Documents from 1610 attest that a middle-aged farmer walking home began hearing a mysterious female voice. He looked around and saw on a cloud-veiled treetop a Diwata-like figure, interpreted by Catholic priests as a Marian apparition. The Blessed Virgin was purported to hold a rosary in her right hand with the Christ Child in her left arm whole surrounded by a heavenly glow. The figure told the farmer where she wanted the people to build a simbahan (originally referring to indigenous shrines, now used to mean church), and so a chapel was built on the hilltop site of the apparition, forming the nucleus of the present town.

Our Lady of the Rosary is depicted in other countries with similar attributes, with the accoutrement and style of the vestments varying across cultures. The Manaoag image is distinct from other statues in its sculpture and regalia, particularly its crown.

A pilgrim replica of the image also exists and is toured around parishes in the Philippines for veneration.

=== Regalia and security ===
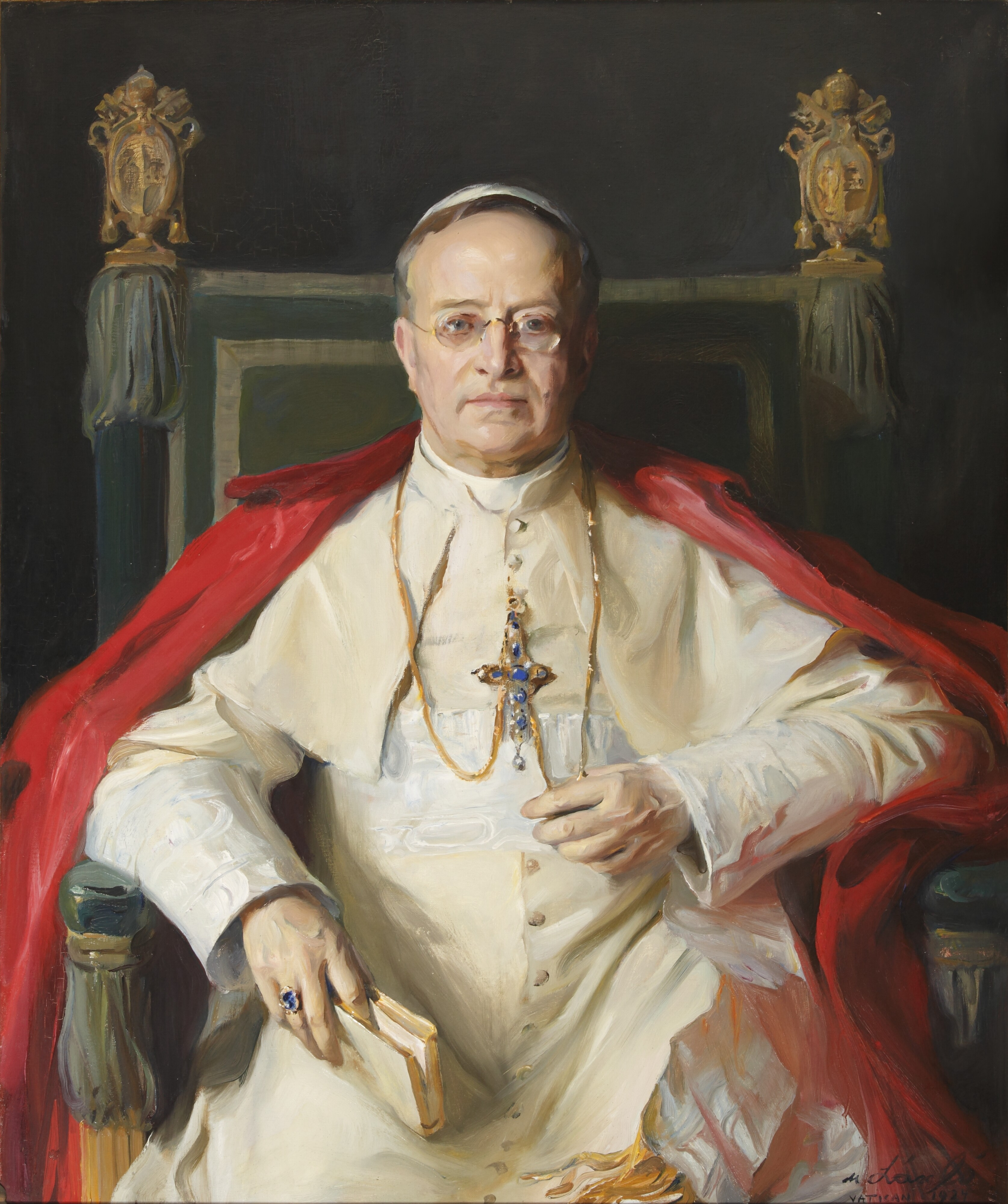
Portrait of Pope Pius XI who decreed the pontifical coronation of the image. By the Hungarian artisan, Philip de László, oil on canvas. c. 1924-25

The image and her bejeweled crown are considered priceless. There have been several attempts to rob the shrine of jewels sewn into the icon's dress and set into its regalia, which include crowns, aureolas, rosary, sceptres, and marshal's baton.

Several of her golden crowns and haloes are deposited at the shrine's museum, donated by both local and foreign devotees. An expensive collection of liturgical vestments that have been used by the image and the Dominican priests are also on display, as are an array of perfumes used to anoint the image. These are ex-votos given by devotees and pilgrims from around the world.

The image is fully secured within a bulletproof glass enclosure above the new high altar, an elevated pedestal, and four golden candelabras. The coat-of-arms of the Dominicans is embedded above the image's window as a sign of the Order's devotion to her. The narra wood bas-relief Isabelo Tampinco beneath her altar beautifully depicts the historic events connected to Virgin.

The Archdiocese of Lingayen-Dagupan, to accommodate the Filipino custom of venerating images by touch its body or clothing, constructed a staircase to its Camarín ("dressing room") on the second floor behind the apse. The room has pews in front of the alcove behind the image, and supplicants kneel before a small window behind the statue to pray and touch the hem of its mantle. They would also drop written prayers into a nearby box. After venerating the image, devotees pass through the religious goods shop on their way out.

Details of the face of the image

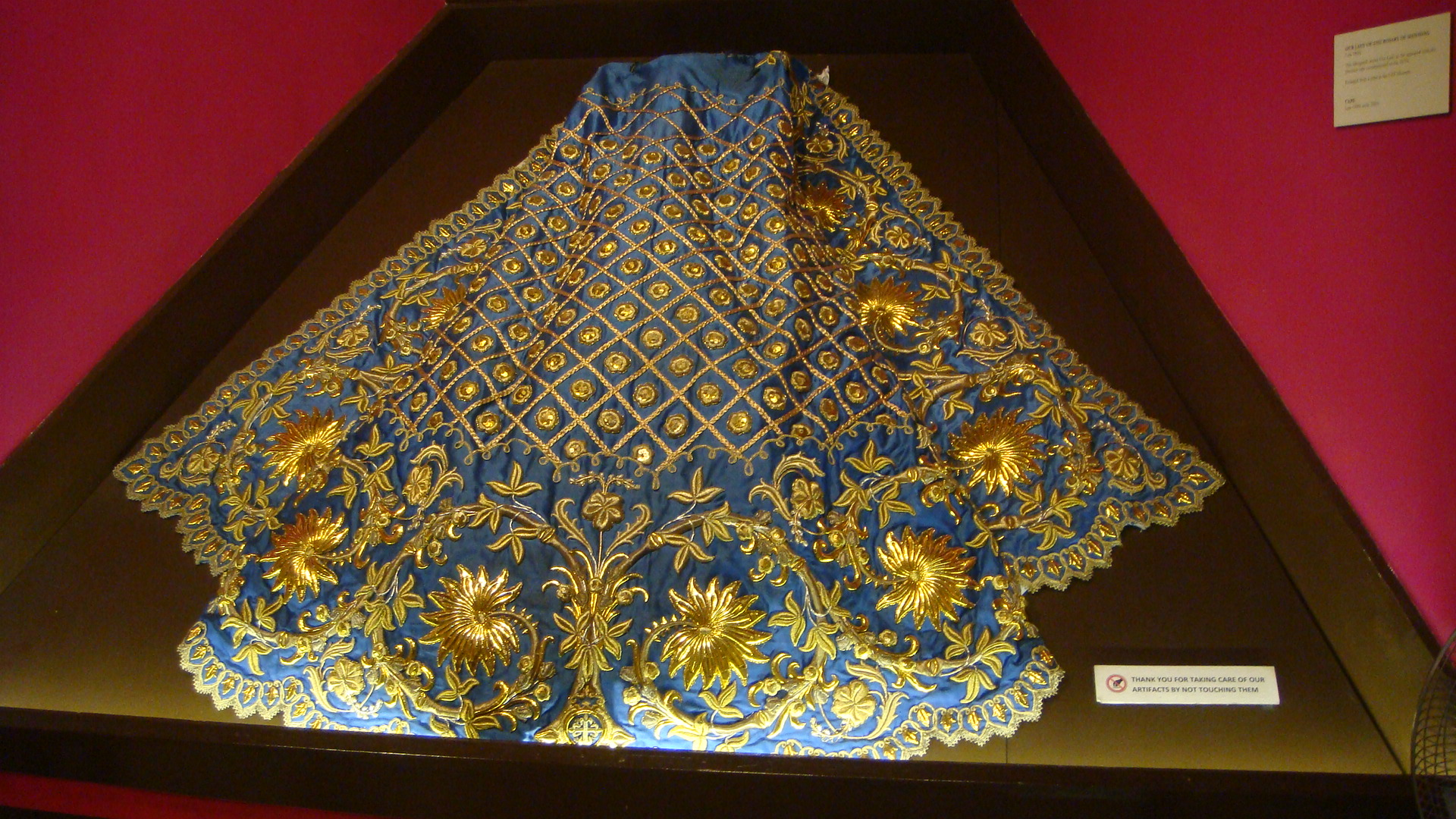
A precious mantle within the basilica museum, c. 1870

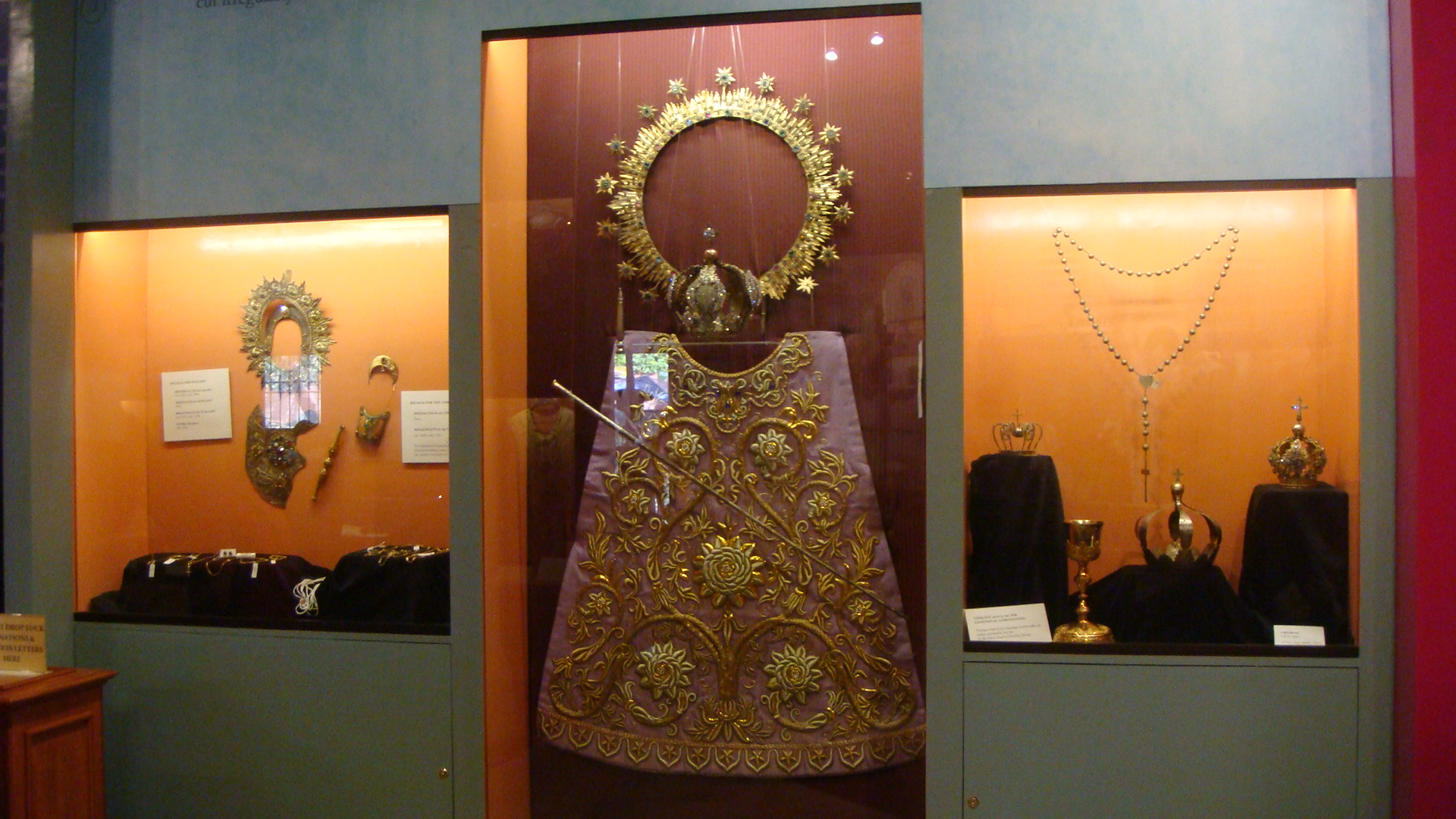
Old regalia of the image including its breastplate, haloes, crowns, sceptres, baton, and vestments in the museum

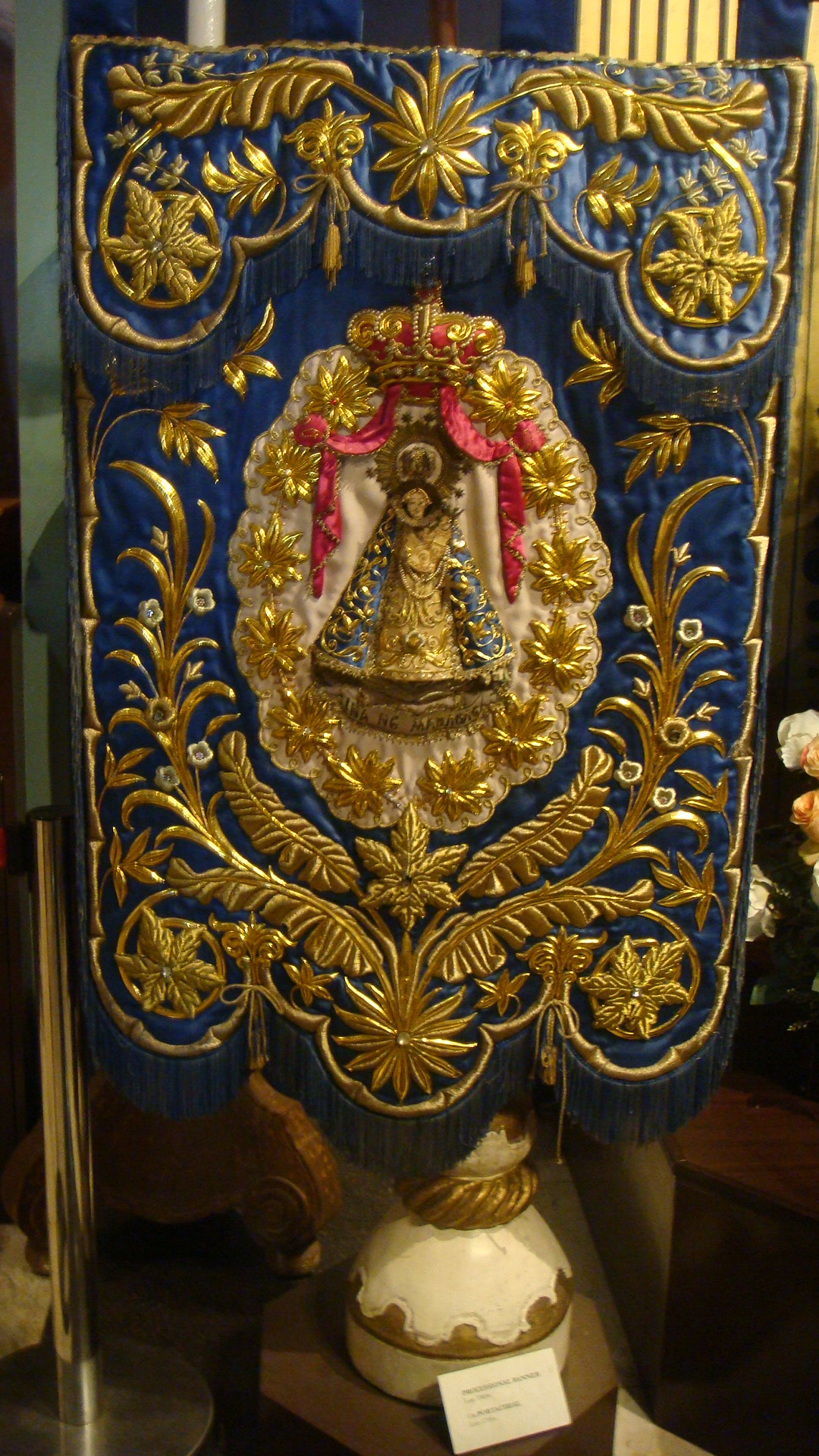
An embroidered processional banner or gonfalon on display in the museum

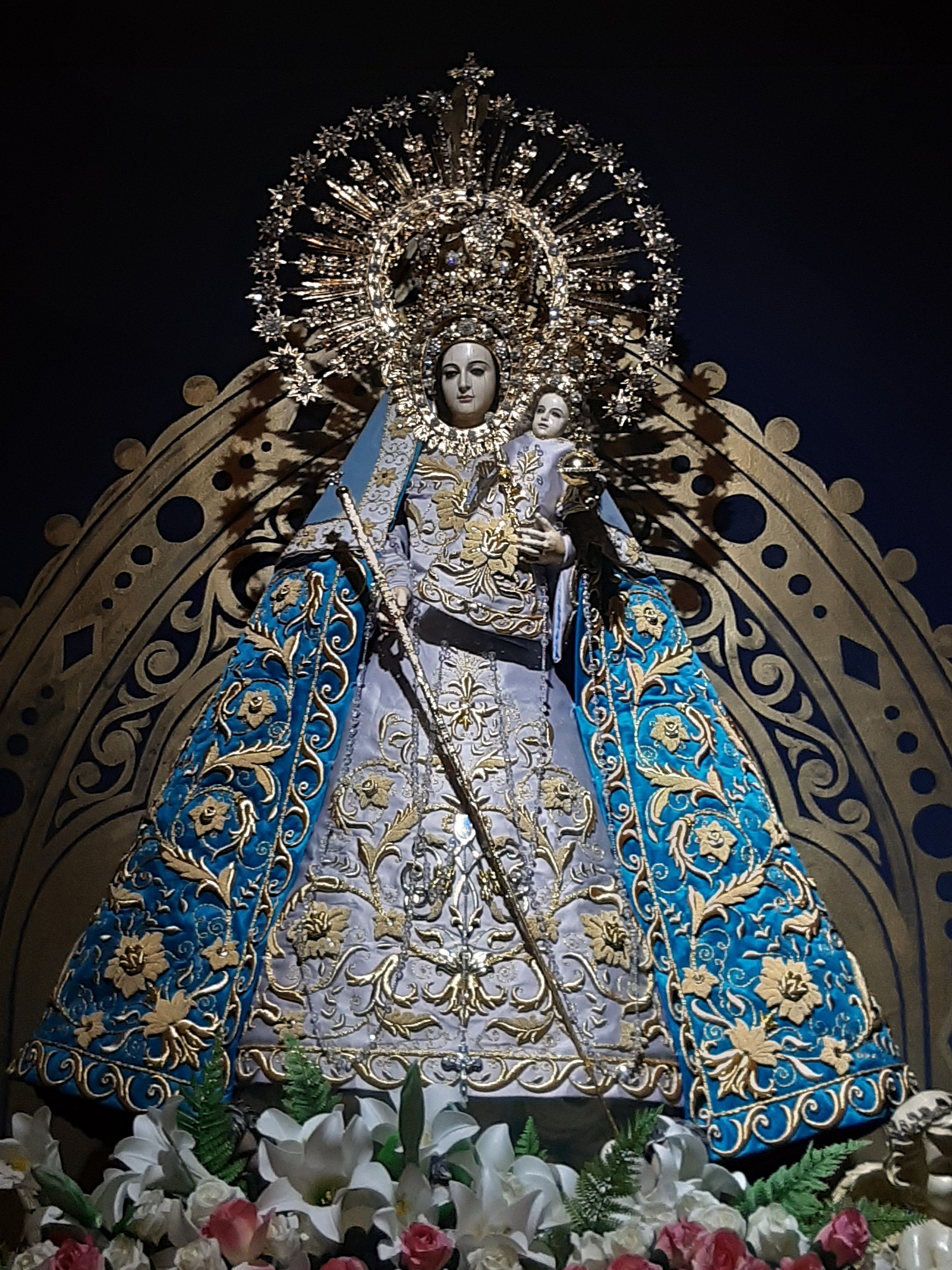
An antique ivory replica as exhibited in the museum

== Marian devotion and veneration ==
=== Purported miracles ===
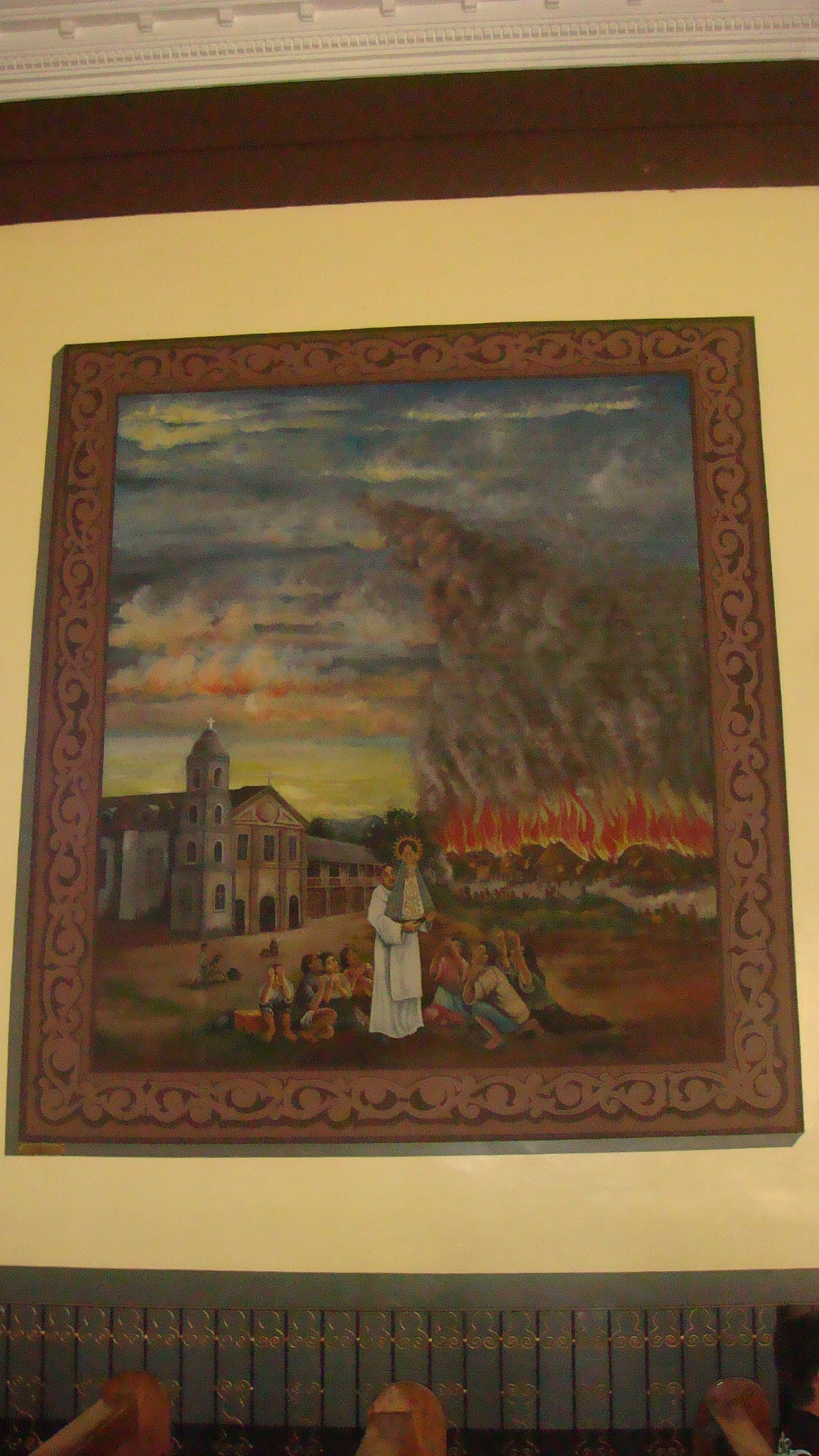
Mural in the transept depicting of the image purportedly sparing the town from a wildfire

Some of the earliest miracles attributed to Our Lady of Manaoag, including the original apparition, are depicted in the murals in the church.

During the Spanish era, animist mountain tribes burnt down newly-Christianized villages. The town of Manaoag was among the settlements burnt by the raiders, with locals fleeing to the thatched-roof church. The pillagers’ leader climbed over the church compound's crude fence and shot flaming arrows at all parts of the church, but the building miraculously did not catch fire.

During the Second World War, Imperial Japanese forces dropped several bombs onto the church complex. The structure itself was only moderately damaged; four bombs were released above the church, with three landing on the plaza and the façade, destroying both. The last bomb fell into the sanctuary, but miraculously did not explode. The supposed presence of chrysanthemums in the church prevented Japanese soldiers from desecrating the place, as the flower is a revered emblem of the Japanese Imperial Family.

Other miracles recounted and attributed to the Lady of Manaoag includes rainfall during droughts, reviving an already-dead boy through holy intercession and holy water, stopping a fire that originated from the church, and resisting various attempts at relocating the shrine.

Miracles attributed to the Lady of Manaoag in modern times are widespread, attested by believers and widely promoted by word of mouth, publications and legends. As such, pilgrims often invoke Her intercession in times of dire need, with some of the petitioners travelling from far away.

=== Feasts ===
Dates for the Feast Days of Our Lady of Manaoag, 2026–2031
Year	Coronation (Eastertide)	Rosary Feast
2026	April 22	October 4
2027	April 14	October 3
2028	May 3	October 1
2029	April 18	October 7
2030	May 8	October 6
2031	April 30	October 5

Our Lady of Manaoag is celebrated on two feast days. The first takes places on the third Wednesday of Eastertide, which aligns with tradition that the Virgin Mary appeared twenty days after Easter Sunday. It is now commonly referred to as the Pistay Baley ("town fiesta") or the "Summer Fiesta", while the Dominicans refer it as the "Coronation Feast", which marks the anniversary of the image's canonical coronation. The second feast day takes place on the first Sunday in October, commonly known as the Rosary Feast, as it takes place in the month dedicated to Our Lady of the Rosary.

=== Services ===
Thousands converge on the shrine every Saturday and Sunday to pray for their intentions, attend Holy Mass, pray the Rosary, offer flowers, light candles, purchase religious articles, have religious articles or vehicles blessed, get holy water, and join in the daily and seasonal activities. The blessings of religious articles and vehicles are performed at the back of the church grounds after every Mass, while holy water is also dispensed there for free to those with containers.

The short dawn procession and Scriptural Rosary every first Saturday before the 5 a.m. Mass is well-attended by regular pilgrims mostly from Metro Manila and from Regions I (Ilocos), II (Cagayan Valley), and III (Central Luzon). The first Saturday rites are pursuant to the Communion of Reparation devotion on the First Saturdays requested by the Virgin Mary in her third apparition at Fátima on 13 July 1917, for the preservation of world peace.

Any of the Holy Masses in the regular schedule may be offered for personal petitions and thanksgiving. The 7 a.m. Masses on Fridays (except on Good Friday) may be offered for the repose of the Poor Souls in Purgatory. These may be done through the parish office at the right side of the main entrance of the church; at the Shrine Museum; or at the back of the church beside the religious store at the entrance of the Candle Gallery. Mass offerings and donations may be offered also through its website.

The church also broadcasts and livestreams masses, services at the shrine and religious programming on their online and social media channels.

=== In Guam ===
A replica of Our Lady of Manaoag was donated by a devotee and brought to the United States unincorporated territory of Guam on 17 August 2012. The statue was enshrined at the Parish of Saint Anthony of Padua in Tamuning, Guam where a dedication rite was held the following day, attended by Filipino-Guamanian Catholics. The statue traveled as a paid passenger aboard a United Airlines flight.

== See also ==
- Catholic Church in the Philippines
