= Colegio de San Juan de Letran =

Roman Catholic college in Manila, Philippines

- Dalubhasaan ng San Juan de Letran (Filipino)
- Latin: Ecclesiasticus Sancti Iohannis Lateranus Collegium Manilana
- Former name: Colegio de Niños Huerfanos de San Juan de Letrán (1620–1630)
- Motto: Deus, Patria, Letran (Latin)
- Motto in English: God, Fatherland, Letran
- Type: Private non-profit Basic and Higher education institution
- Established: 1620; 406 years ago
- Founder: Don Juan Alonso Geronimo Guerrero
- Religious affiliation: Roman Catholic (Dominican)
- Academic affiliations: Intramuros Consortium, PAASCU, PACU, CEAP
- Chancellor: Very Rev. Fr. Gerard Timoner III, OP, SThL
- Rector: Rev. Fr. Raymund Fernando Jose, OP
- Location: 151 Muralla Street Intramuros, Manila, Philippines; 14°35′36″N 120°58′36″E
- Campus: Urban Main; Intramuros, Manila Satellite; Calamba, Laguna; Abucay, Bataan; Manaoag, Pangasinan
- Alma Mater song: Himno del Colegio de Letran
- Patron Saint: St. John the Baptist
- Colors: Blue & red
- Nickname: Letran Knights
- Sporting affiliations: NCAA (Philippines)
- Website: letran.edu.ph

The Colegio de San Juan de Letran (transl. College of San Juan de Letran), also referred to by its acronym CSJL or simply, Letran, is a private Catholic basic and higher education institution owned and run by the friars of the Order of Preachers in Intramuros, Manila, Philippines. It was founded in 1620. Colegio de San Juan de Letran has the distinction of being the oldest college in the Philippines and the oldest secondary institution in Asia.

The college offers programs recognized by the Commission on Higher Education (CHED). Letran was given accreditation by the Philippine Accrediting Association of Schools, Colleges and Universities (PAASCU) to its various programs, namely the Basic Education department, and undergraduate and post-graduate programs from the liberal arts and business administration departments.

Letran remains in its original campus in Intramuros, Manila, and is a member of the Intramuros Consortium.

== History ==
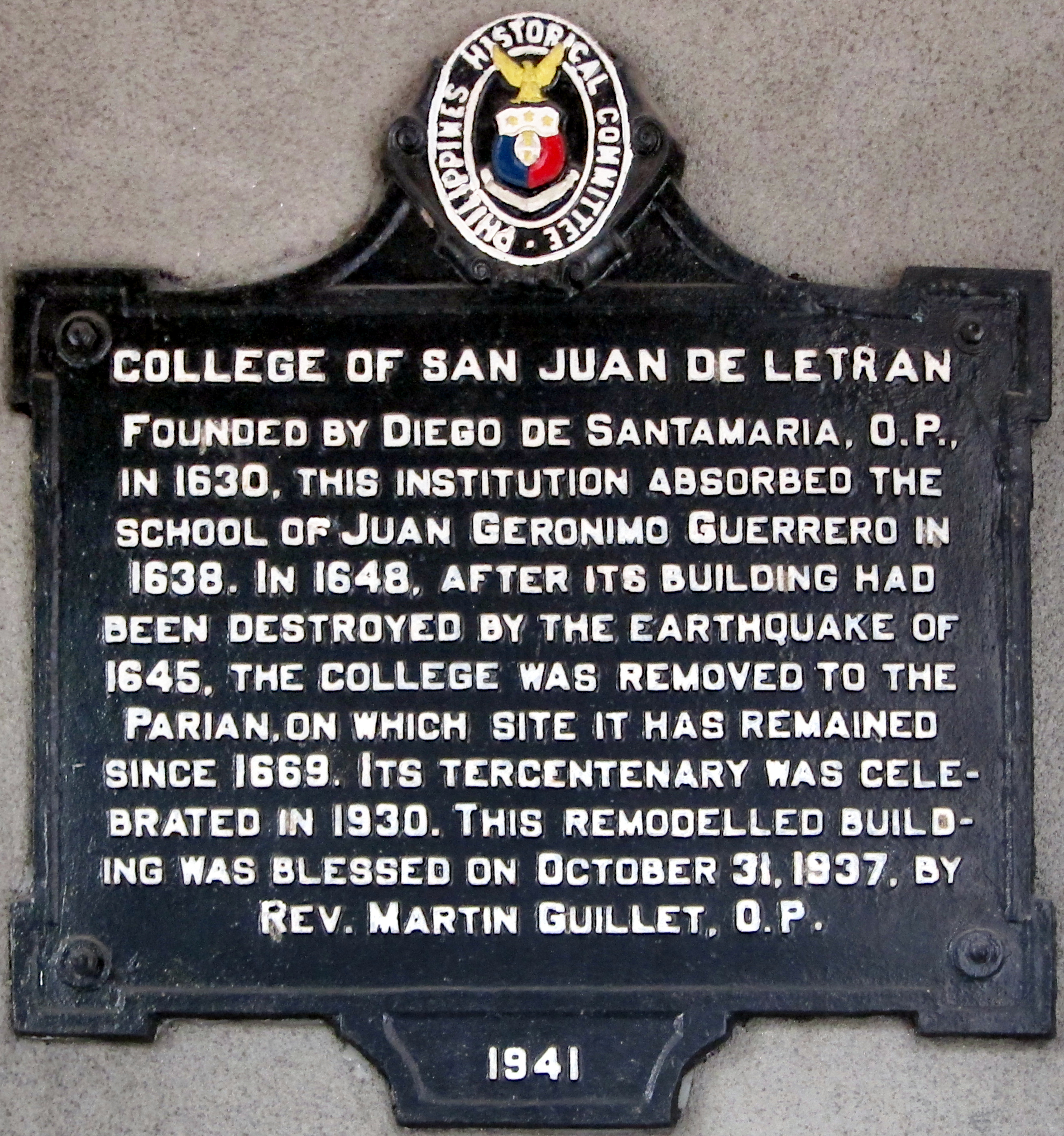
National historical marker installed in 1941

=== Beginnings ===
The name San Juan de Letran is derived from the Basilica of St. John Lateran in Rome, considered as the Mother Church of Christendom. Early in the history of Letran, its chapel was granted many of the privileges enjoyed by the major basilica. Saint John the Baptist, for whom the basilica is named, is the patron saint of Letran.

The college was founded by Don Juan Alonso Geromino Guerrero in 1620, a retired Spanish officer and one of the Knights of Malta, in Intramuros as Colegio de Niños Huerfanos de San Juan de Letran. The school was intended to educate and mold orphans to be good Christian citizens.

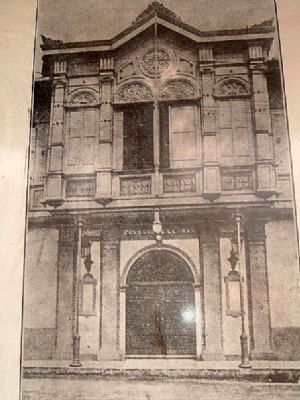
Old San Juan de Letran in Intramuros adjacent to Santa catalina.

Around the same time, Fray Diego de Santa Maria, O.P. founded the Colegio de Huerfanos de San Pedro y San Pablo. As Don Guerrero grew old, the two schools were fused together, and in 1630, it simply became known as Colegio de San Juan de Letran.

=== 18th century ===
In 1738, under the reign of King Philip V of Spain opened the Colegio de San Juan de Letran and University of Santo Tomas, and six scholarships were granted by the king for Chinese, Japanese, and Tonkinese students. Vicente Liem de la Paz, Letran's foremost alumnus, was among the students who enjoyed this scholarship taking up trivium and quadrivium along with four Tonkinese namely: Jose de Santo Tomas, Juan de Santo Domingo, Pedro Martir and Pedro de San Jacinto.

=== 19th century ===
In May 1865, Letran was graded as a College of the First Class by royal decree ordered by Queen Isabella II and, as a result, the school population rose considerably.

In 1886, rector Fr. Bernardino Nozaleda re-organized the school's curriculum into the Lower, Middle, and Superior grades (Infima, Media, y Superior) to conform to modern European and American teaching patterns.

=== 20th century ===
Further expansion took place in 1894 and adjustments were made with the arrival of the Americans in 1900.

After celebrating its tricentennary, Letran was headed by the Rev. Fr. Martin Guillet O.P., who was tasked with replacing Letran's old infrastructure and constructing a new and modern building. The old school building of 1863 was knocked down in 1937 to build the present structure in commemoration of its tricentennial celebration.

The new tricentennial building, now called the St. John the Baptist Building, with elements inspired by the Bauhaus and Art Deco movement of the 1920s and 1930s, was inaugurated under the supervision of Engineer Alberto Guevarra y Sanchez and blessed by Fr. Guillet. It became Letran's main building and facade. These events were followed by the construction of the Elementary, High School and College buildings replacing the old structures respectively. The buildings were named after the Dominican founder and saints.

=== World War II ===
The growth of Letran was temporarily halted when the building was bombed in 1941 and turned into a garrison by the Japanese army in 1944. Letran was temporarily housed in the Dominican church and convent of San Juan del Monte. In school year 1942, classes were temporarily transferred to the Dominican Sanctuario of San Juan del Monte. After the war, Letran returned to its home in Intramuros and resumed operations in 1946. Several new construction projects were inaugurated to replace the old structures wrecked by the war.

=== Post-war period ===
In 1954, Letran admitted its first female students, albeit only in the course of Preparatory Medicine.

In 1961, the first Filipino rector of Letran, Fr. Isidoro D. Katigbak, O.P., was formally installed, and the first four-year course for the degree of Bachelor of Science was granted government recognition by the Department of Education.

In 1967, the college department fully admitted female students to all its courses.

=== Recent history ===
The basic education department started accepting first-year female enrollees in 2006.

In April 2007, Fr. Tamerlane Lana O.P. was elected rector and president of Letran, of the Intramuros and Abucay campuses, by the board of trustees to serve a four-year term until April 2011. Fr. Lana became the 80th rector of the Manila campus. Fr. Lana's administration has undertaken the task of changing and upgrading Letran's academic standards to meet those required to attain university status. This work also includes the revision of the vision and mission, research development, community service, and the 12-year strategic plan for 2008 until 2020.

Starting academic year 2007–08, Letran became a "wi-fi zone" to cater its students access to the internet.

In October 2007, two former Letran administrators were among the 498 Spanish martyrs beatified by Pope Benedict XVI. They are Fr. Jesus Villaverde Andres, OP, a former rector; and Fr. Antonio Varona Ortega, OP, a former professor and moderator of the NCAA Philippines.

On July 3, 2008, Fr. Lana formally launched the Letran Center for Intramuros Studies (LCIS). The initiative to establish the center sprang from the 12-year development plan as the school hopes to become a leader in cultural and historical studies, particularly on the subject of Intramuros. The day also marked the 435th anniversary of the signing of the royal decree by King Philip II in San Lorenzo, Spain on July 3, 1573, that prescribed the foundation of Hispanic colonial towns, which served as basis for the systematic layout for the establishment of Intramuros, which was known then as Spanish Manila. In 2012, the College of Engineering and Information Technology, the youngest higher education unit, was established.

In June 2015, Fr. Clarence Victor C. Marquez, O.P. was elected 81st Rector and President of Letran Manila and Bataan.

In July 2016, various Letran's academic programs were granted Level III status by PAASCU. The programs that were granted Level III Status are BS Entrepreneurship, BSBA Business Economics/ BSBA Economics, BSBA Human Resource Development and Management, BSBA Marketing Management/ BSBA Marketing, BSBA Operations Management, AB Advertising, AB Broadcasting, AB Communication, AB Political Science, AB Psychology, AB Philosophy, Bachelor of Secondary Education major in English and Mathematics.

On February 21, 2020, President Rodrigo Duterte signed Proclamation 908, declaring 2020 as the "Year for the Celebration of the Quadricentennial Anniversary of the Colegio de San Juan de Letran."

In July 2023, Fr. Raymund Fernando P. Jose, O.P. was elected 82nd Rector and President of Letran Manila and Bataan.

In September 2024, Letran was granted deregulated status by the Commission on Higher Education.

Starting academic year 2025–2026, Letran has officially merged the College of Education (COED) and College of Liberal Arts and Sciences (CLAS) into one, now called the College of Education and Liberal Arts and Sciences (CELAS).

== Campus ==
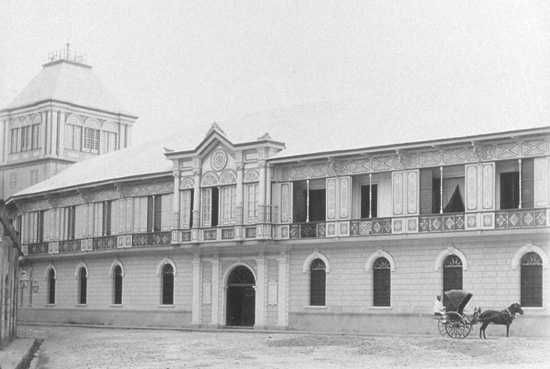
Main entrance (ca. 1880)

=== St. John the Baptist Building ===
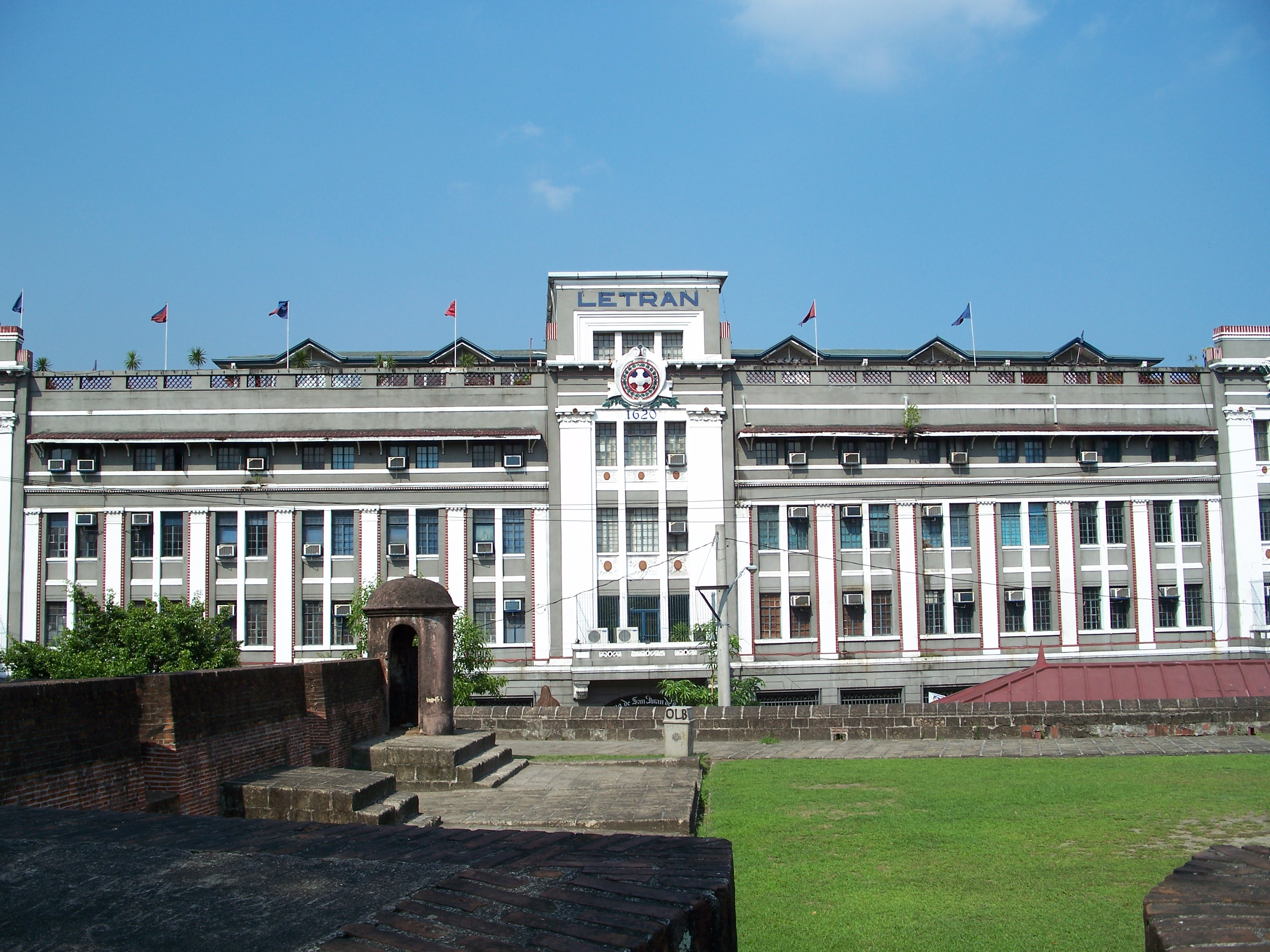
The historical facade of Letran

The Letran Tricentennial building, named the St. John the Baptist Building and also known as the administration building, houses the Office of the Rector and President. It houses the admission office, financial affairs office, the Letran Center for Intramuros Studies (LCIS) office, guidance counselor office, the information technology center, College of Business Administration and Accountancy, College of Education, and the Institute of Information Technology. The bookstore, lobby, and chapel are also in this building. The St. John Lateran convent of the Letran Dominican Fathers is located here.

The facade underwent a series of refurbishing in 2018. Lights and proper wirings are also added to lit Muralla and the building itself to add colors to the once grey structure at night.

=== Our Lady of Aranzazu Building ===
The former St. Antoninus Building is dedicated in honor of Our Lady of Aranzazu, where the Arch-confraternity of Nuestra Senora de Aranzazu was solemnly established in Letran on December 16, 1772, by virtue of a pontifical brief issued by Benedict XIV on September 18, 1748. It holds the promenade and Salon de Actos (student lounge).

The campus hosts a historical marker that the Philippines Historical Committee, now the National Historical Commission of the Philippines, installed in 1939 to denote the place of the establishment of the arch-confraternity.

=== St. Dominic de Guzman Building ===
The building named after the founder of the Order of Preachers (Dominicans). This building houses classrooms, Science and Psychology Laboratory, College of Liberal Arts and Sciences and The Institute of Communication.

=== St. Thomas Aquinas Building ===
St. Thomas Aquinas Building

This building houses the Library and Media Center for Communication Arts students. The Media Center has two sections: Instructional Media and Broadcast Media. It provides human and material resources for instructional and broadcast purposes.

=== St. Raymond of Peñafort Building ===
The former High School Building, St. Raymond of Peñafort houses the Office of the Vice Rector for Religious Affairs. It includes the Accounting Stock Room, Lost and Found Office, Hospitality Management Facility, Auxiliary Services, Audit Services, Letran Alumni Association Office, and the Center for Community Development Office. The school clinic is in this building.

=== St. Albert the Great Building ===
This building is also known as the Student Center Building because it houses student facilities such as the canteens, a modern 400-seat auditorium, Office of the Student Affairs, Letran Student Council Office, the Graduate School faculty room and student lounge, six classrooms, Thesis Section, The Lance Publication Office, and the Office of the Dean in Graduate School.

=== St. Vincent Ferrer Building ===
This building serves the basic education department, the College of Engineering and Information Technology, the music room, and the speech laboratory.

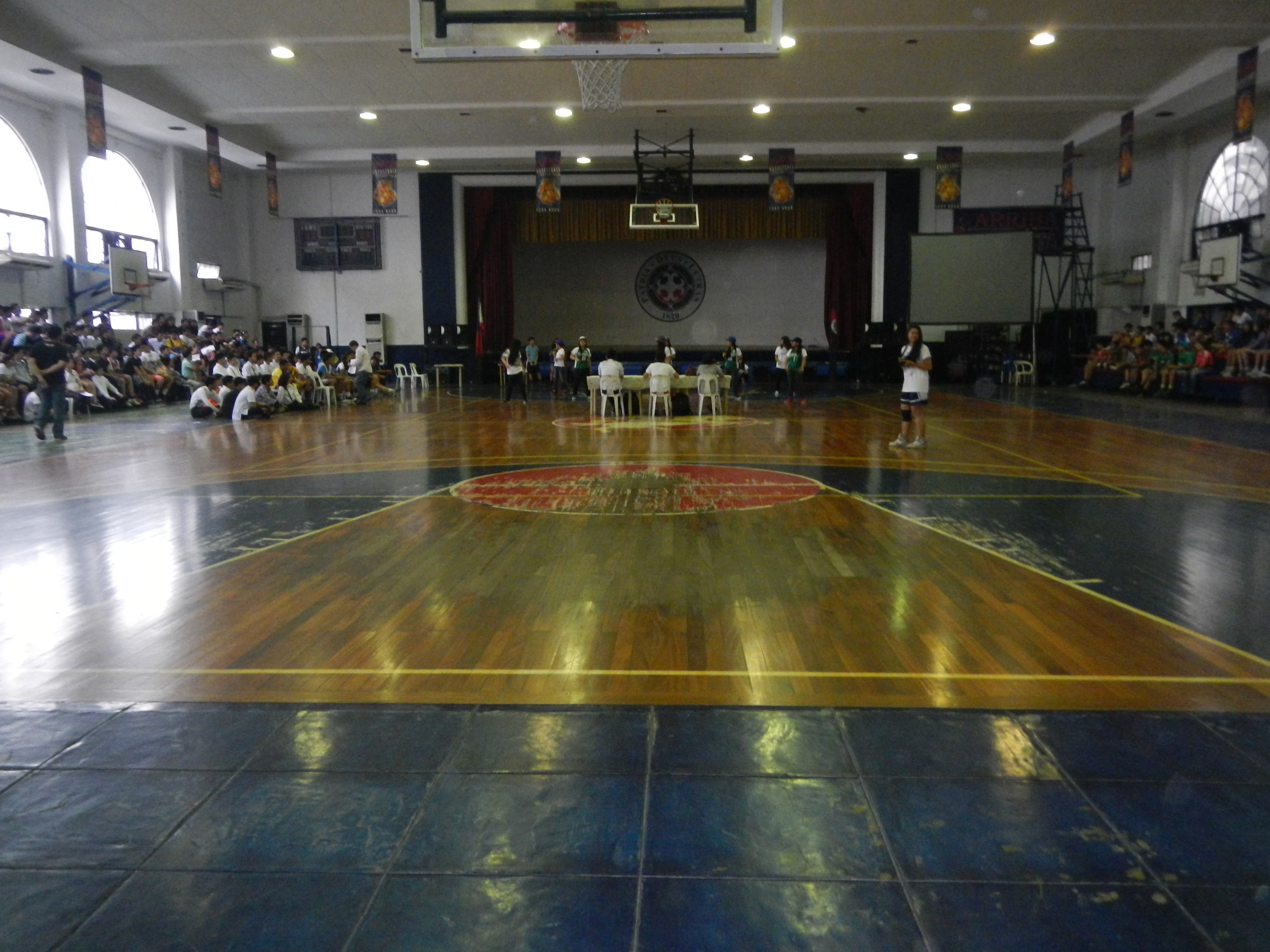
The old Blessed Antonio Varona Gym, before it was demolished in 2019

=== Blessed Antonio Varona Gymnasium ===
The gymnasium-auditorium was the home of the Knights and Squires, Letran's collegiate and high school varsity teams that play in the NCAA and other sports tournaments, located right across the Student Center Building along Beaterio Street in Intramuros. The Letran Gym was opened on November 6, 1955, and was blessed by Archbishop Rufino J. Santos, then-Archbishop of Manila.

It has three physical education classrooms with a centralized air-conditioned unit. It houses the Letran Hall of Fame and the P.E. faculty. The Letran Gym is named in honor of Blessed Antonio Varona, O.P., former Letran Professor and Athletics Moderator.

The old gym was demolished in April 2019 and will be replaced by the Quadricentennial Building, a multi-purpose sports facility.

== Academics ==
=== College of Business Administration and Accountancy ===
The College of Business Administration and Accountancy offers undergraduate programs in accountancy, business administration, entrepreneurship, accounting information systems, hospitality management, tourism management, and related fields.

=== College of Education and Liberal Arts and Sciences ===
The College of Education and Liberal Arts and Sciences (CELAS) officially began in the academic year 2025–2026, through the merger of the former College of Liberal Arts and Sciences (CLAS), and the College of Education (CoED). The merger marked a return to an earlier academic structure known as the College of Liberal Arts, Sciences, and Education (CLASED), which had previously existed from 2002 before the colleges were separated in 2006. The reorganization was implemented as part of the institution's academic recovery and restructuring strategy.

=== College of Engineering and Information Technology ===
Letran started to offer engineering programs in 2012. With the transfer of the Institute of Information Technology, Letran established its youngest college, the College of Engineering and Information Technology (CEIT). The CEIT currently offers four engineering programs and three specialization on the information technology program.

==== Institute of Information Technology ====
In 2003, Letran Manila was the first school to partner with Microsoft for the Microsoft IT Academy program in the Philippines. It is one of the academic institutions that offers a degree in Information Technology mapped with the premier certification from Microsoft. It began as an area in the College of the Liberal Arts, Sciences, and Education. Starting A.Y. 2012–13, the Institute of Information Technology transferred to the College of Engineering.

=== Graduate school ===
The Letran Graduate School was founded in 1974 by Director Ramon C. Reyes. The Letran Graduate School began with the Master in Business Administration (MBA) program. In 1980, under the leadership of Dean Theodoro T. Abrigo, the Master in Business Administration Special Management Program (MBA SMP) was introduced. In 1995, Dean Perfecto Panuelos launched the Doctor of Business Administration (DBA) program.

=== Basic Education ===
Letran has a Basic Education department that has been in existence for almost four centuries. Letran started as an orphanage for boys, then began accepting female enrollees in the first year of the academic year 2006–07 for its basic education program.

== Athletics ==
Letran is a member of the National Collegiate Athletic Association from 1928 to 1932, and since 1936.

Letran currently participates in basketball, volleyball, football (soccer), track and field, taekwondo, Lawn Tennis, and table tennis. The varsity teams are called Letran Knights (for seniors division), Squires (for juniors division) and Lady Knights (for women's division)

The seniors basketball team is the second most successful team in the NCAA. Since joining in the 1928–29 season, the Knights have won a total of twenty titles. The most recent championship came in the 2022–2023 tournament.

Their most prominent rivals are the De La Salle Green Archers (before the Green Archers left the NCAA), San Beda Red Lions, San Sebastian Stags and the Mapua Cardinals, their neighbor in Intramuros.

== Official publications ==
- The Lance, the official student publication of Colegio de San Juan de Letran – Manila. It began in 1976 when the Letran News ceased to exist in 1972 due to Martial Law.
- The Templar (formerly Esplendente and The Letran Scroll), the official student publication of Letran Senior High School Department
- Letran Page for the Elementary Level
- Muralla is the literary portfolio of The Lance
- Colegio News (formerly The Letran News), the official newsletter of the Letran administration department. It began as a page from The Varsitarian, the official student publication of the University of Santo Tomas. The Letran News then spun-off as an independent bi-lingual monthly magazine.
- Letranense – the annual yearbook of Letran Manila. Formerly called The Letran Mirror. Letranense began as the Spanish section of the Letran News.
- KNIGHTline, the official newsletter of the Letran Alumni Association
- Luz Y Saber, the semiannual international scholarly journal of Letran Manila published every June and December.
- Antorcha, the semiannual academic journal of senior high school and undergraduate students of Letran Manila.

== Notable people ==
The persons affiliated with Letran are known as Letranites. Several Letranites include prominent figures in Philippine politics, religion, sports, business, and media.

In politics, Letran alumni include four Philippine presidents: Emilio Aguinaldo, Manuel Quezon, Sergio Osmeña, and Jose P. Laurel.

Letranites in religion include St. Vicente Liem de la Paz, Bishop Socrates Villegas, and Gregorio Aglipay.

In sports, most especially in basketball, Letran alumni include Lauro Mumar, Samboy Lim, and Kevin Alas

Several roads and streets are named after Letranites. These include Ortigas Avenue, Quezon Boulevard, Osmeña Highway, Honorio Lopez Boulevard, Quintin Paredes Street, Leon Guinto Street, and Pablo Ocampo Street.
