= Colegio de San Juan de Letran Bataan =

Roman Catholic college in Bataan, Philippines

- Dalubhasaan ng San Juan de Letran Bataan (Filipino)
- Motto: Deus, Patria, Letran (Latin)
- Motto in English: God, Fatherland, Letran
- Type: Private non-profit Basic and Higher education institution
- Established: June 4, 2006; 20 years ago
- Religious affiliation: Roman Catholic (Dominican)
- Academic affiliations: PAASCU, CEAP
- Chancellor: Very Rev. Fr. Gerard Timoner III, OP, SThL
- Rector: Rev. Fr. Raymund Fernando Jose, OP
- Location: Dominican Hills Avenue, Gabon, Abucay, Bataan, Philippines; 14°43′43″N 120°28′16″E
- Campus: Suburban
- Alma Mater song: Himno del Colegio de Letran
- Patron saint: John the Baptist
- Colors: Blue & red
- Nickname: Letran Knights
- Sporting affiliations: CLRAA, PRISAA
- Website: letranbataan.edu.ph

The Colegio de San Juan de Letran Bataan (CSJL Bataan; Filipino: Dalubhasaan ng San Juan de Letran Bataan), or simply Letran Bataan, is a private Catholic basic and higher education institution owned and run by the friars of the Order of Preachers in Abucay, Bataan, Philippines.

Letran Bataan is the youngest institution in the Letran system, serving as the extension campus of Colegio de San Juan de Letran in Intramuros, Manila. Inaugurated and blessed on June 4, 2006, it serves as the first Catholic tertiary school in Bataan, offering education from basic education to the collegiate level.

== History ==
Rev. Fr. Rogelio Alarcon, O.P., former Rector & President of Letran Manila, and an alumnus, proposed the idea of having another campus in the north.

The Convent of St. John Lateran, the Board of Trustees of Letran Manila, and the Dominican Province of the Philippines approved the establishment of Letran Bataan in 1998.

In a meeting held by the Provincial Council on March 29, 1999, the acceptance of the donation of a lot in Abucay, Bataan for an extension campus was approved. This was donated by Abucay Mayor Liberato Santiago, Nicanor Soriano and his wife during the term of Bataan Governor Leonardo Roman. Environmental planner and architect Yolanda Reyes decided to take the highest point of the donated lot to be the site of the campus.

A four-lane road was also constructed to connect Dominican Avenue from Roman Superhighway which leads up to the campus.

Construction started in 2000 in the 15-hectare area as spearheaded by Rev. Fr. Edwin Lao, O.P., Rector & President of Letran Manila from 1999 to 2007.

The blessing and inauguration were on June 4, 2006. Bishop Socrates Villegas, then-bishop of the Diocese of Balanga, officiated the Eucharistic celebration and blessing.

The opening of classes of the pioneer batch comprising 79 students was on June 14, 2006. The dean then was Dr. Victoria Rosas, with assistant dean and registrar Reynaldo Javier.

The first foundation week celebration was held on January 30, 2007.
