= Daniel Presto =

Filipino Roman Catholic bishop (born 1963)

The Most Reverend Daniel Oca Presto D.D.
- Bishop of San Fernando de La Union
- Province: Lingayen-Dagupan
- See: San Fernando de La Union
- Appointed: May 9, 2018
- Installed: August 2, 2018
- Predecessor: Rodolfo Fontiveros Beltran
- Previous post: Vicar General of the Diocese of Iba (2014–2018)

Orders
- Ordination: December 1, 1990 by Deogracias Iñiguez, Jr.
- Consecration: July 30, 2018 by Florentino Lavarias

Personal details
- Born: April 7, 1963 (age 63) Mangaldan, Pangasinan, Philippines
- Motto: "Confido In Misericordia Dei" (I Trust in the Mercy of God)
- Coat of arms

Styles of Daniel O. Presto
- Reference style: His Excellency; The Most Reverend
- Spoken style: Your Excellency
- Religious style: Bishop

Daniel Oca Presto (born April 7, 1963) is a Filipino bishop of the Roman Catholic Church, currently serving as the bishop of Diocese of San Fernando de La Union since 2018. Prior to his episcopal appointment, he served as the vicar general and the administrator of the Diocese of Iba.

== Early life and education ==
Presto was born on April 7, 1963, in Mangaldan, Pangasinan, Philippines. He pursued his seminary formation and theological studies at San Carlos Seminary in Makati. He obtained master's degree in education at the De La Salle University Manila.

== Priesthood ==
He was ordained a priest for the Diocese of Iba on December 1, 1990. After ordination he served as the Parochial Vicar of Saint Rita Parish in Olongapo City and Saint Michael Parish in Santa Cruz, Zambales from 1991 to 1992. He later became School President of Columban College in Olongapo City from 1993 to 2005. Between 2005 and 2012, he served as director of the Saint Augustine School of Iba, president of the Magsaysay Memorial College of San Narciso and Vicar Forane of the Saint Joseph Vicariate.

From 2012 to 2018, he became the Parish Priest in San Antonio, Zambales, and a member of the presbyteral council and various diocesan commissions. In 2014, he was named Administrator of the Diocese of Iba after Bishop Florentino Lavarias was named Archbishop of San Fernando.

== Episcopal ministry ==
On May 9, 2018, Pope Francis appointed Presto as the bishop of San Fernando de La Union, succeeding the late bishop Rodolfo Fontiveros Beltran. He was officially installed at the Saint William the Hermit Cathedral on August 2, 2018.

Within the Catholic Bishops' Conference of the Philippines (CBCP), Presto has served as the chairman of the Commission on Catechesis and Catholic Education since 2023.

== Advocacy and contributions ==
Bishop Presto has been actively involved in environmental advocacy, strongly opposing the construction of a coal-fired power plant in La Union, aligning with the Church's stance on climate justice and environmental protection.

He has been a vocal advocate for fisherfolk's rights, joining other bishops in urging the Philippine government to protect the livelihood of Filipino fishermen amid maritime disputes in the portion of the South China Sea known in the Philippines as the West Philippine Sea.

In 2024, he championed the canonical coronation of the image of Our Lady of Charity in Agoo, La Union, a decree granted by Pope Francis.

Catholic Church titles
Preceded by Rodolfo Fontiveros Beltran	Bishop of San Fernando de La Union; 2018–present	Incumbent
