= Basilica Minore of Our Lady of Charity =

Roman Catholic church in La Union, Philippines

Agoo Basilica
- Minor Basilica And Diocesan Shrine of Our Lady of Charity
- Santa Monica Parish
- La Basílica Menor y Santuario Diocesano de Nuestra Señora de Caridad (Spanish)
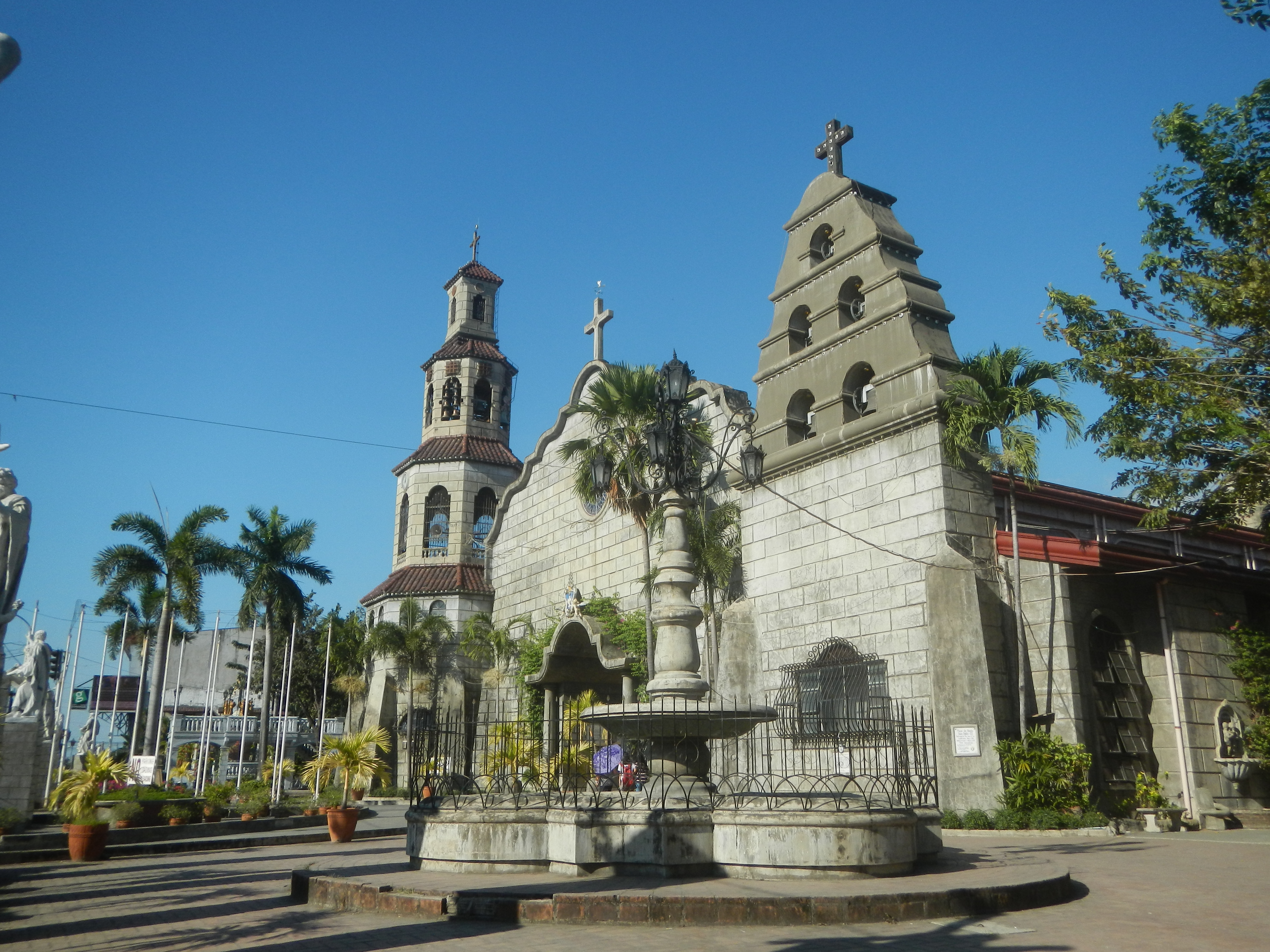
- The church in 2020

- Location in Luzon Location in the Philippines
- 16°19′23″N 120°22′3″E
- Location: Agoo, La Union, Philippines
- Denomination: Roman Catholic

History
- Status: Minor basilica (Basilica Decree: 1982.07.15)
- Consecrated: 1978

Architecture
- Functional status: active
- Architect: Ignacio Palma Bautista
- Architectural type: Basilica
- Style: Mexican-Baroque
- Groundbreaking: 1976
- Completed: 1978

Specifications
- Materials: Reinforced concrete

Administration
- Archdiocese: Lingayen-Dagupan
- Diocese: San Fernando de La Union

The Minor Basilica of Our Lady of Charity, formerly known as Santa Monica Church and Agoo Basilica, is a Roman Catholic minor basilica in Agoo, La Union, Philippines. The shrine is dedicated to the Blessed Virgin Mary under the venerated title of Our Lady of Charity.

The current Basilica is the seat of the Santa Monica Parish of the Diocese of San Fernando de La Union under the Vicariate of Saint Francis Xavier, now under the leadership of parish priest Alfonso V. Lacsamana and parish vicar Liberato A. Apusen.

Pope John Paul II raised the shrine to the status of Minor Basilica via the pontifical decree Signum illud Sanctuariumque on 15 July 1982. Pope Francis granted a decree of pontifical coronation towards its enshrined Marian image on 29 April 2024. The rite of coronation was executed on 6 December 2024.

== History ==
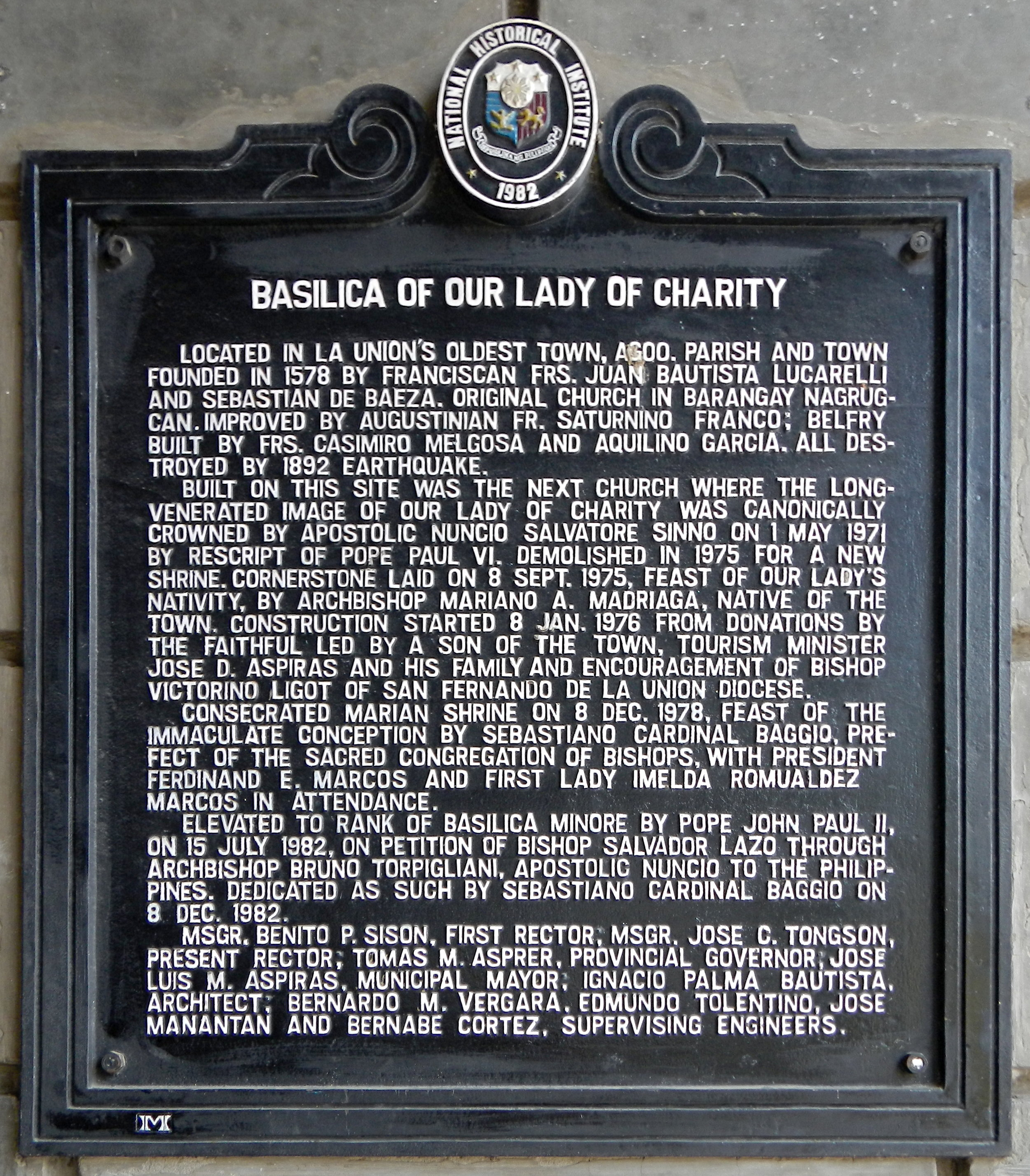
Church NHI historical marker installed in 1982

The parish was founded in 1578 by Franciscan friars John Baptist Lucarelli of Pesaro, Italy, and Sebastián de San Francisco of Baesa, Spain. The original church was constructed with native materials, nipa and bamboo (in Barangay Nagreban or Nagrugcan) under its patron saint Francis of Assisi. In 1598, Saturmino Franco, Casimiro Melgosa and Aquilino García finished a three-tiered bell tower for the church. In the same year, the Augustinians named Saint Monica as the town's new patron saint.

On March 16, 1892, a massive earthquake destroyed the church, paving the way for reconstruction of the shrine of "Nuestra Señora de Caridad" in 1893. It was later demolished and replaced with the present church in 1975.

=== Construction and consecration ===
The present church was started with the laying of cornerstone on September 8, 1975. The church was finished and consecrated as a Marian shrine on December 8, 1978, by Cardinal Sebastiano Baggio coinciding with the quadricentennial of the Christianization of Agoo.

Cardinal Agostino Casaroli's re-script dated July 15, 1982, signed for Pope John Paul II, granted Bishop Salvador Lazo's petition elevating the Shrine of Our Lady of Charity to a minor basilica. In the Philippines, the Vatican granted 12 minor basilicas, with the Agoo Basilica as the sixth in order of their institution.

=== 1990 Luzon earthquake ===
The basilica was badly damaged during the catastrophic 7.7-magnitude Luzon earthquake of July 16, 1990, which struck at 4.26 p.m. devastating Agoo and other coastal areas. The basilica was again repaired and renovated. The earthquake's epicenter was about 10 kilometres (6.2 mi) southeast of Cabanatuan and killed more than 1,600 people, devastating La Union, Baguio and Dagupan.

The bell tower, the only remaining structure of the 1893 building, collapsed during the earthquake.

=== Plaza del Beato Juan Pablo II and the new belfry ===
On May 1, 2001, a historical marble marker was laid in the basilica's belfry and bell tower upon solemn dedication of the new Plaza de Beato Juan Pablo II and the new belfry by Bishop Artemio L. Rillera. The new belfry and bell tower replaced the previous tower destroyed by the 1990 earthquake.

== Architectural details ==
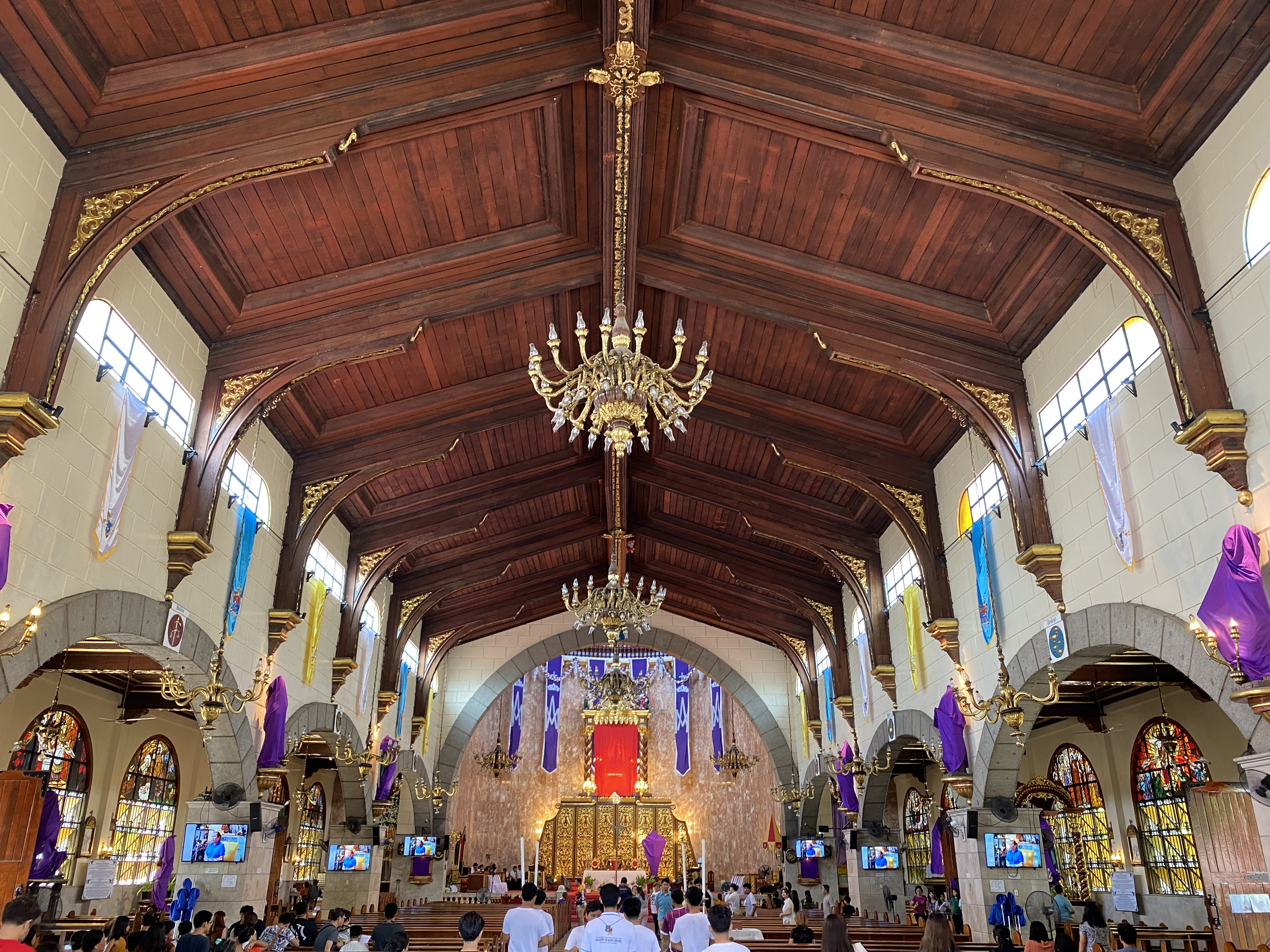
Central nave and altar in 2025

The Minor Basilica of Our Lady of Charity is noted for its Mexican-Baroque architectural features. A rosette stained glass window upon the basilica's facade is a marked contrast to the gray color of the front wall. Amid the statues of Saints Peter and Paul statues at the main door are carved Hebrew scripts, which is a short form of the Ten Commandments.

Agoo Basilica's unconventional architecture is demonstrated by its two non-identical bell towers. To the left of the facade is a four-level hexagonal tower, while the right bell tower is a bell-gable in its form. The confessional and the ceiling has a similar architecture. One is in front of the stained glass window of the Crucifixion of Jesus with the two thieves.

The reredos of the altar has eight wooden panels with intricately carved floral design focused on its center. At the top center of the panel hangs a large crucifix. Above the panel is where the foot-high Our Lady of Charity statue is enshrined under large canopy supported by four twisted columns. Her feet rest on an urn-shaped pedestal with the same floral design as the reredos. Two angels flanked her sides behind a silvery backdrop.

A pipe organ in the choir loft watches the chandeliers dotting the middle aisle, 2-tiered and carved or made of Filipino mahogany, illustrating culture of Agoo.

The basilica has preserved stone blocks dragged from the original church amid its charming garden, an old wishing well and the interior mural "The Second Coming of Christ" (by Rey Gimeno).

== Our Lady of Charity ==
Statue of Our Lady of Charity of Agoo

The 17th-century wooden statue of Our Lady of Charity was first venerated and enthroned in Bantay, Ilocos Sur and brought to Agoo by an Augustinian priest. It was Maximo Vicente of Manila who refurbished it after it survived the massive earthquake of 1892.

The crowned head of the original statue is made of baked clay covered with a polished coat of fine white powder. The child Jesus raises his right hand as in a blessing, and holding a golden globe on his left hand.

Bishop Victorino C. Ligot of the Roman Catholic Diocese of San Fernando de La Union filed the ecclesiastical petition to the Sacred Congregation for the Sacraments and Divine Worship in Rome for the canonical coronation of the statue, with the collaboration of Jose D. Aspiras, who helped restored the belfry, but was denied with a letter issued from the Congregation dated April 4, 1971, which in turn, was suggested to crown the image by the authority of the bishop instead. (Note: Sacra Congregatio pro Culto Divino: Prot. n. 801/71, April 4, 1971, formally suggesting for an episcopal coronation instead for the image. Signed by Cardinal Arturo Tabera Araoz. Vatican Secret Archives.)

The Marian image, locally called as "Apo Caridad", was episcopally crowned on May 1, 1971, by Apostolic Nuncio Carmine Rocco, the appointed Apostolic Nunciature to the Philippines. Later, the statue was desecrated by local bandits with the theft of its previous jewel-studded ivory head.

The accounts attributed to Apo Caridad in the basilica's altar, which includes the recovery of Agoo from the destruction of the July 1990 quake, has made Agoo a religious center in northern Luzon. Our Lady of Charity's feast day is celebrated every May 4, on the feast of Saint Monica, in whose honor both the basilica parish and museum are dedicated.

On April 29, 2024, Pope Francis officially decreed the pontifical—canonical coronation of the Marian image through the Dicastery for Divine Worship and the Discipline of the Sacraments. This distinction was announced on June 5, 2024, through a circular released by the Roman Catholic Diocese of San Fernando de La Union regarding the approval of the petition. The coronation was presided by the Apostolic Nuncio to the Philippines, Charles John Brown, on December 6, 2024.

== Santa Monica Parish Museum ==
The basilica's Santa Monica Museum is located to the left of the church at the Bishop Mariano A. Madriaga Hall. The 1815 Bell of Santa Monica Parish, located at the ground floor of the museum, is the main attraction at the entrance of the museum which also displays the portraits of the basilica's principal donor, Jose D. Aspiras and wife. The heritage church bell was discovered at Bugallon, Pangasinan in 1963.

The second floor contains the extensive memorabilia of Agoo Archbishop Mariano A. Madriaga and Archbishop Antonio L. Mabutas (1921-1999). Mabutas was born in Agoo and became the Bishop of Laoag and later, Archbishop of Davao on December 9, 1972. He served as a bishop for 37 years and a priest for a total of 53 years. He was a Datu Bago awardee, a recognition given by the Davao City government to its outstanding residents.

== Gallery ==
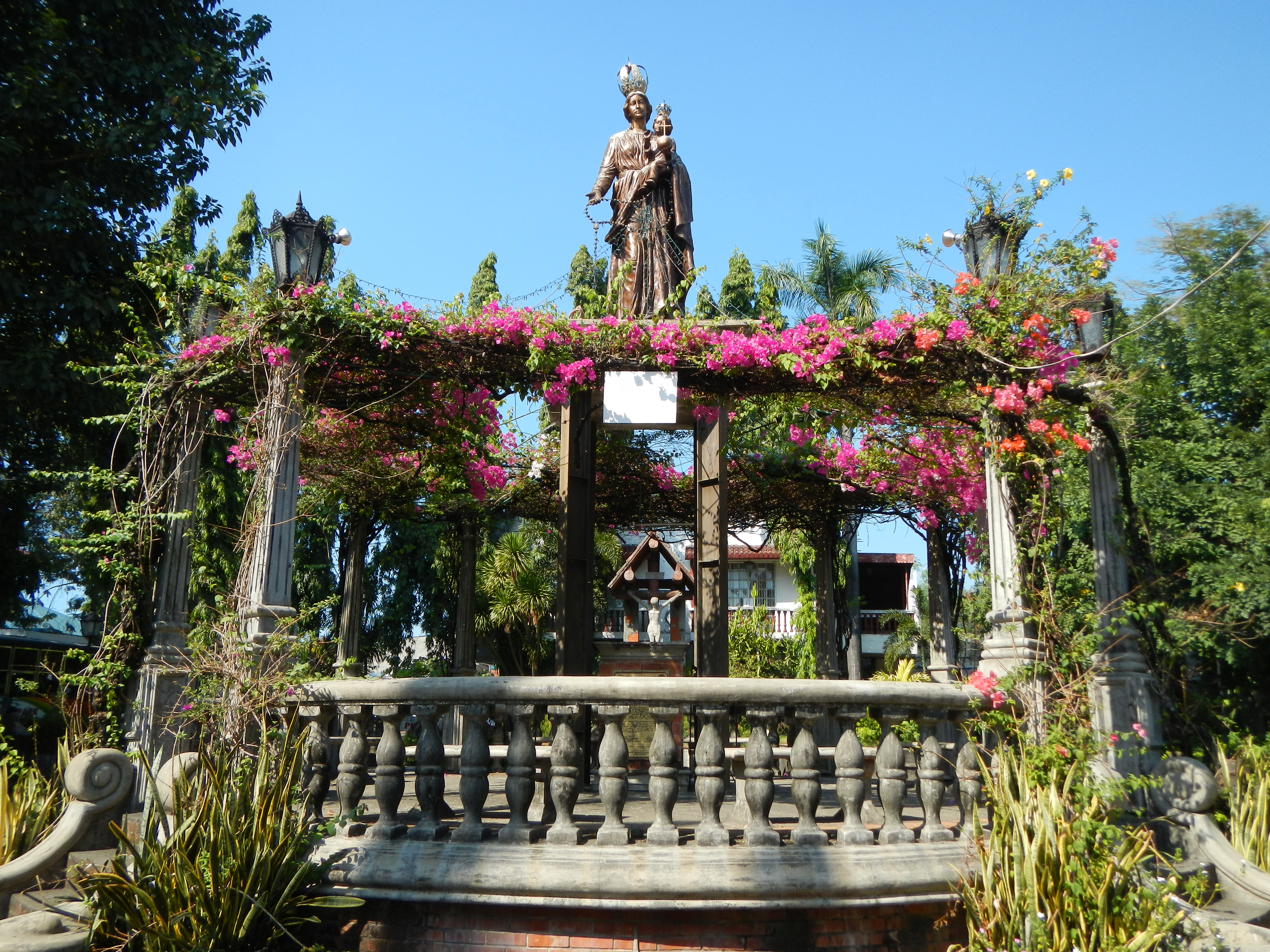
Brass Statue (consecrated) of Our Lady of Charity in the Basilica Plaza

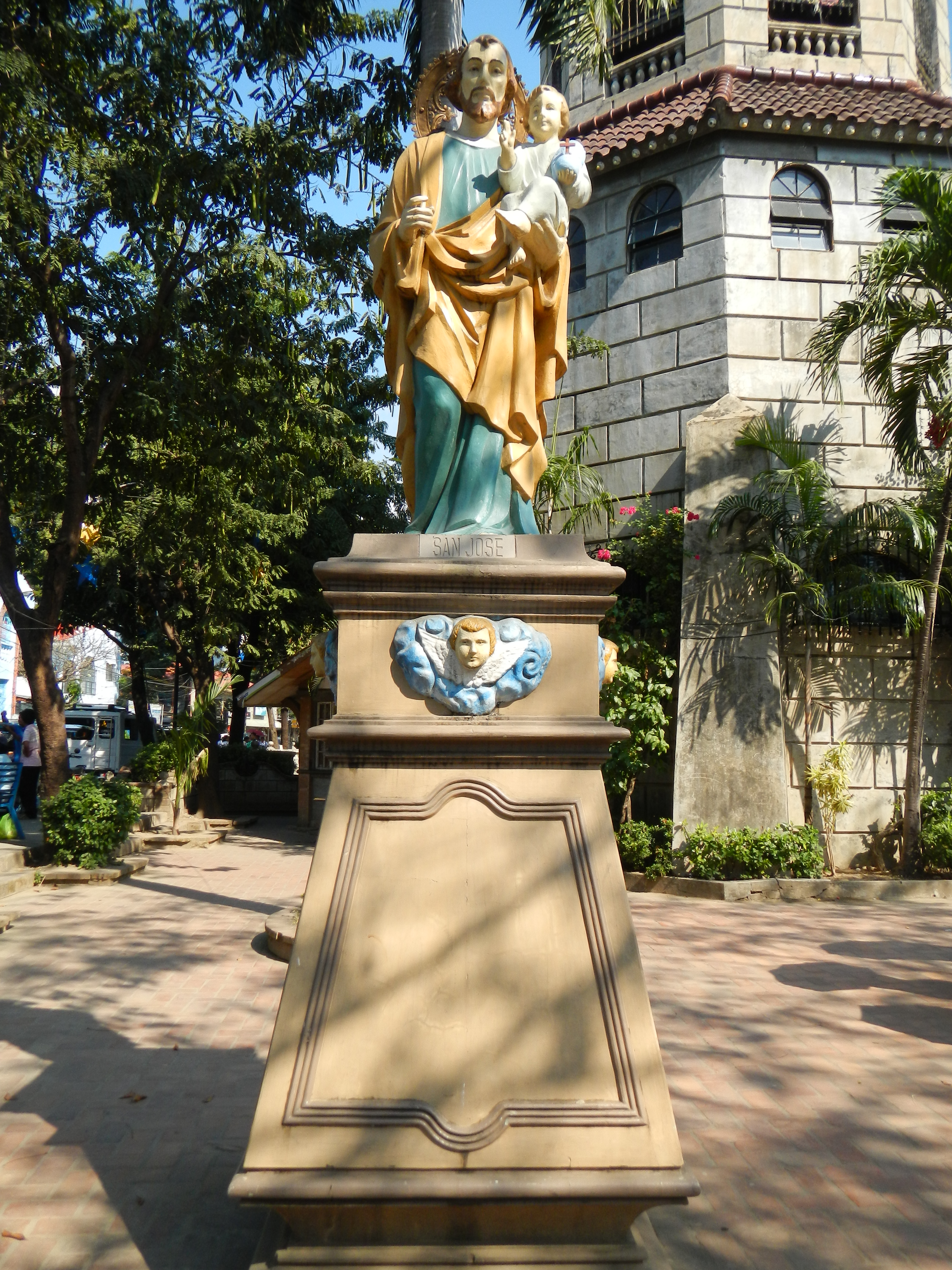
St. Joseph and Baby Jesus statue at the patio

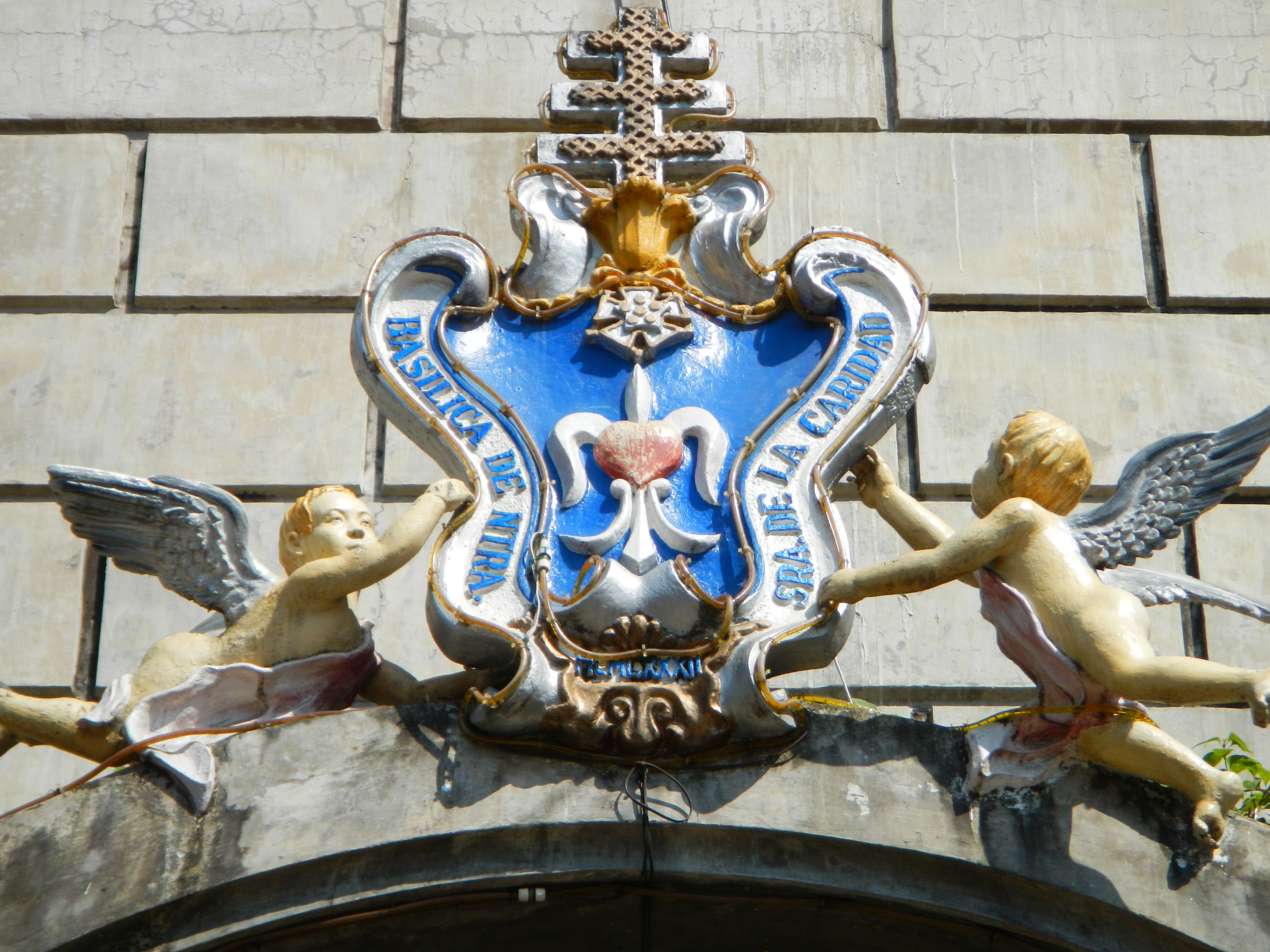
Basilica de Nuestra Señora de la Caridad regalia at the center of the front porch cover

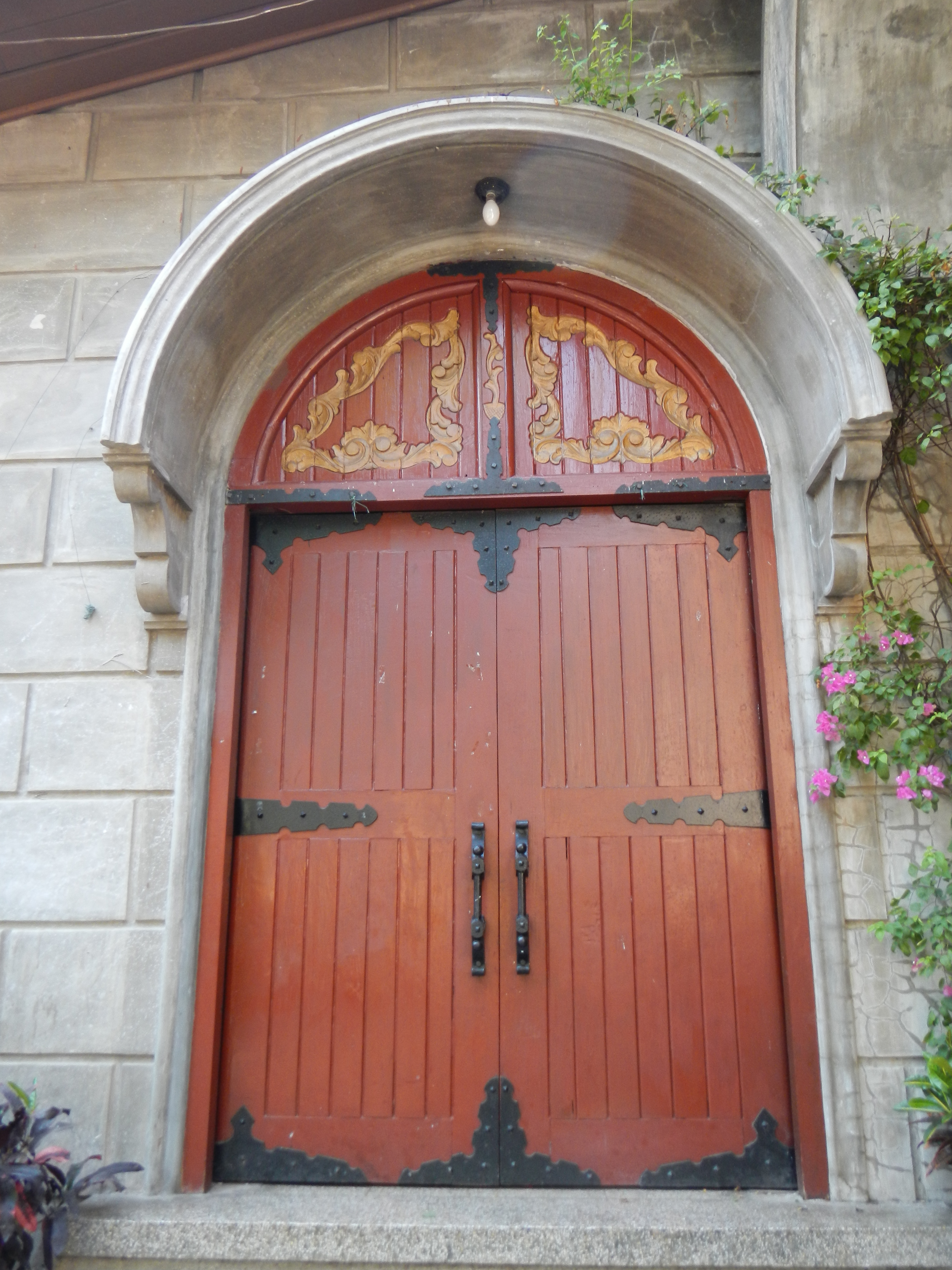
The side door of the church

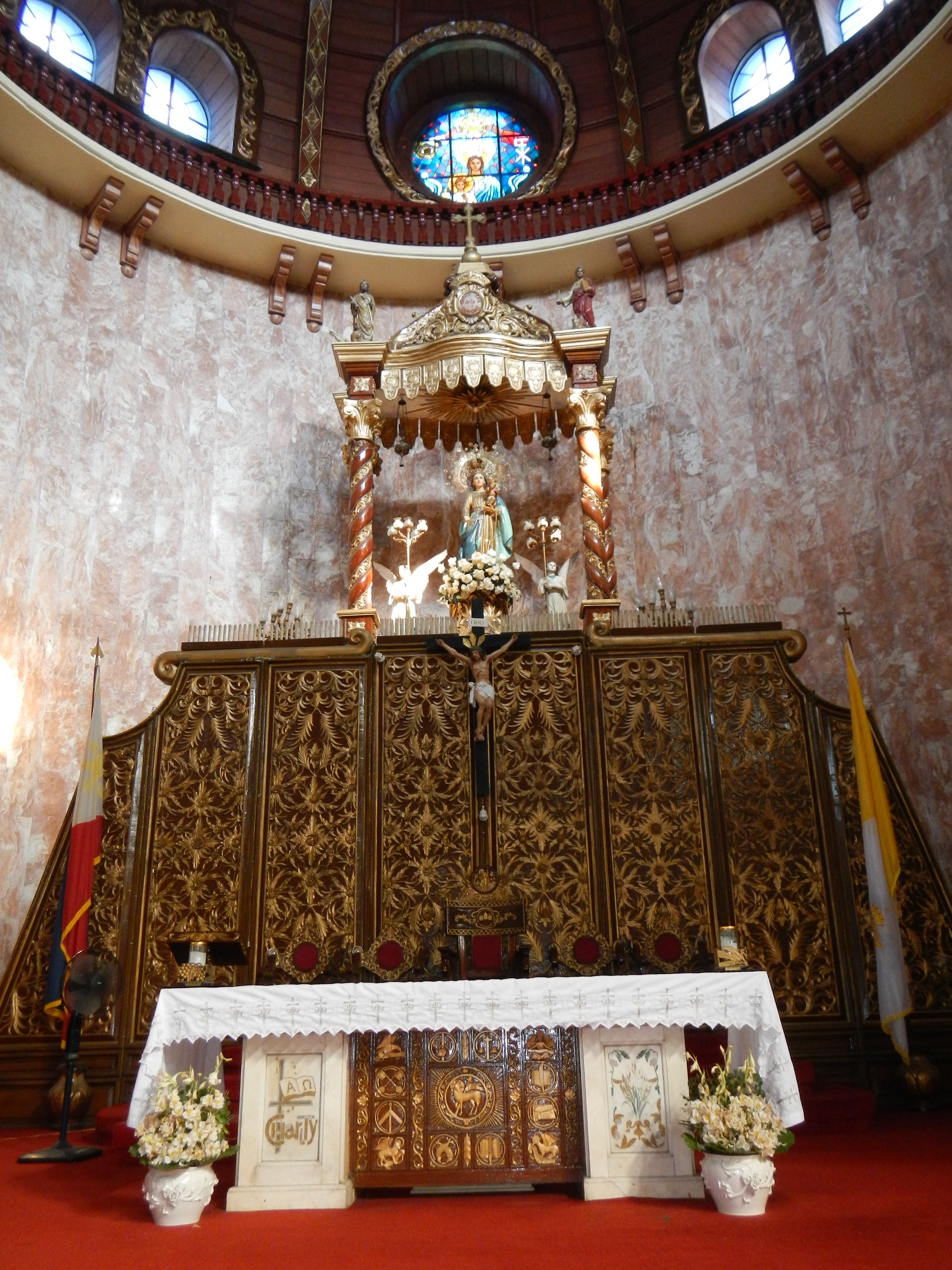
Reredos of the main altar with Our Lady of Charity

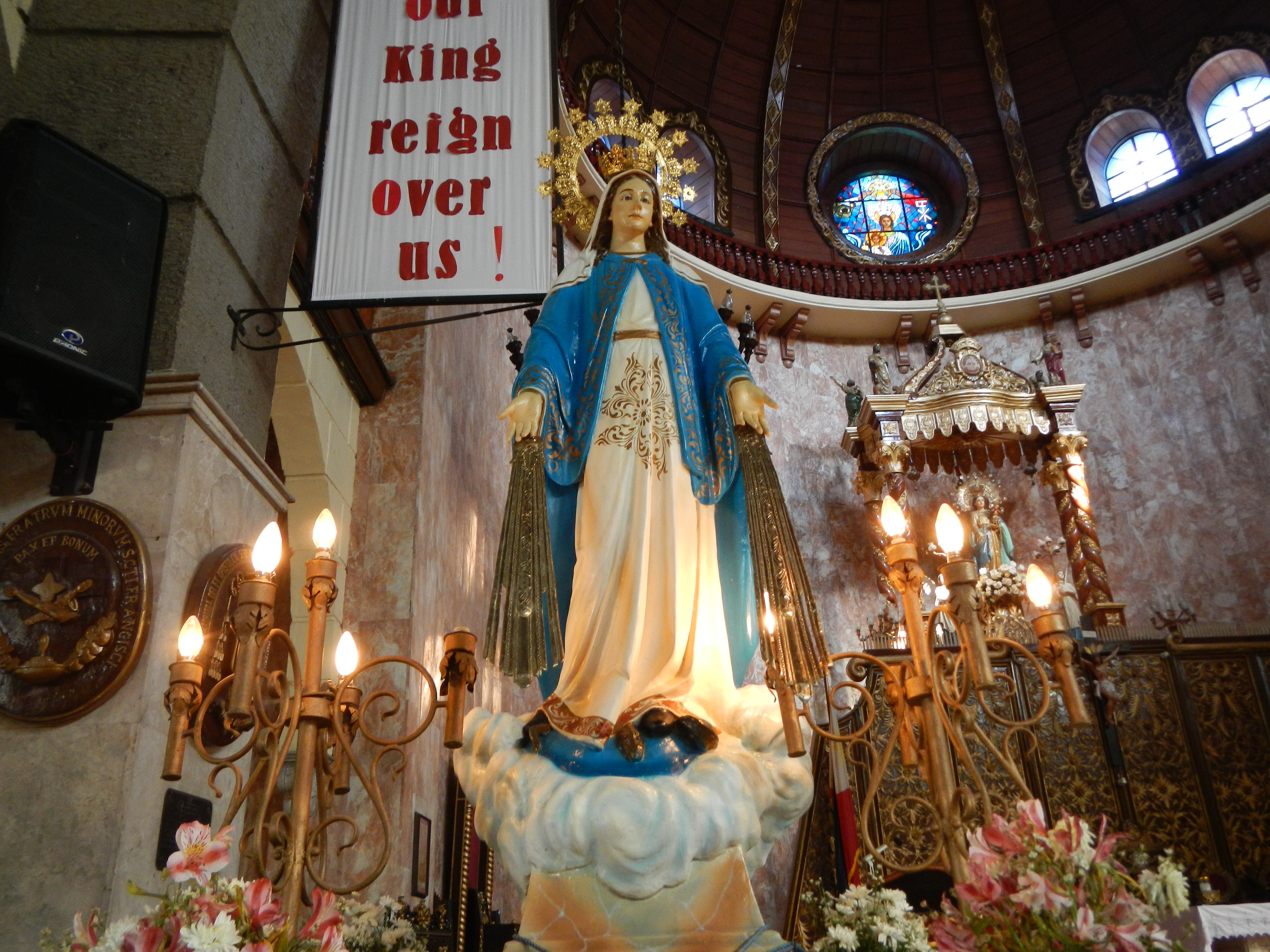
Our Lady of the Miraculous Medal

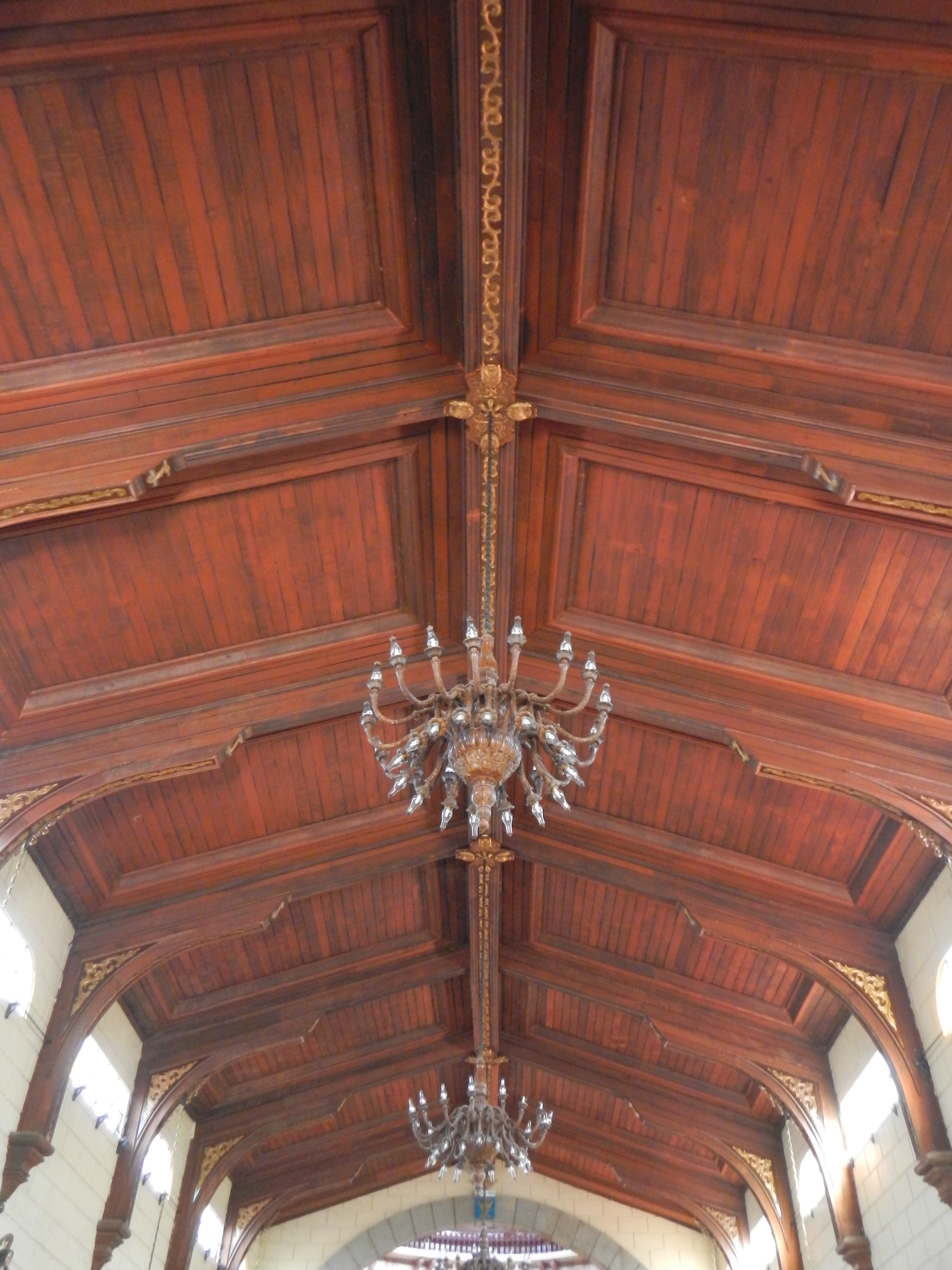
The ceiling of the nave

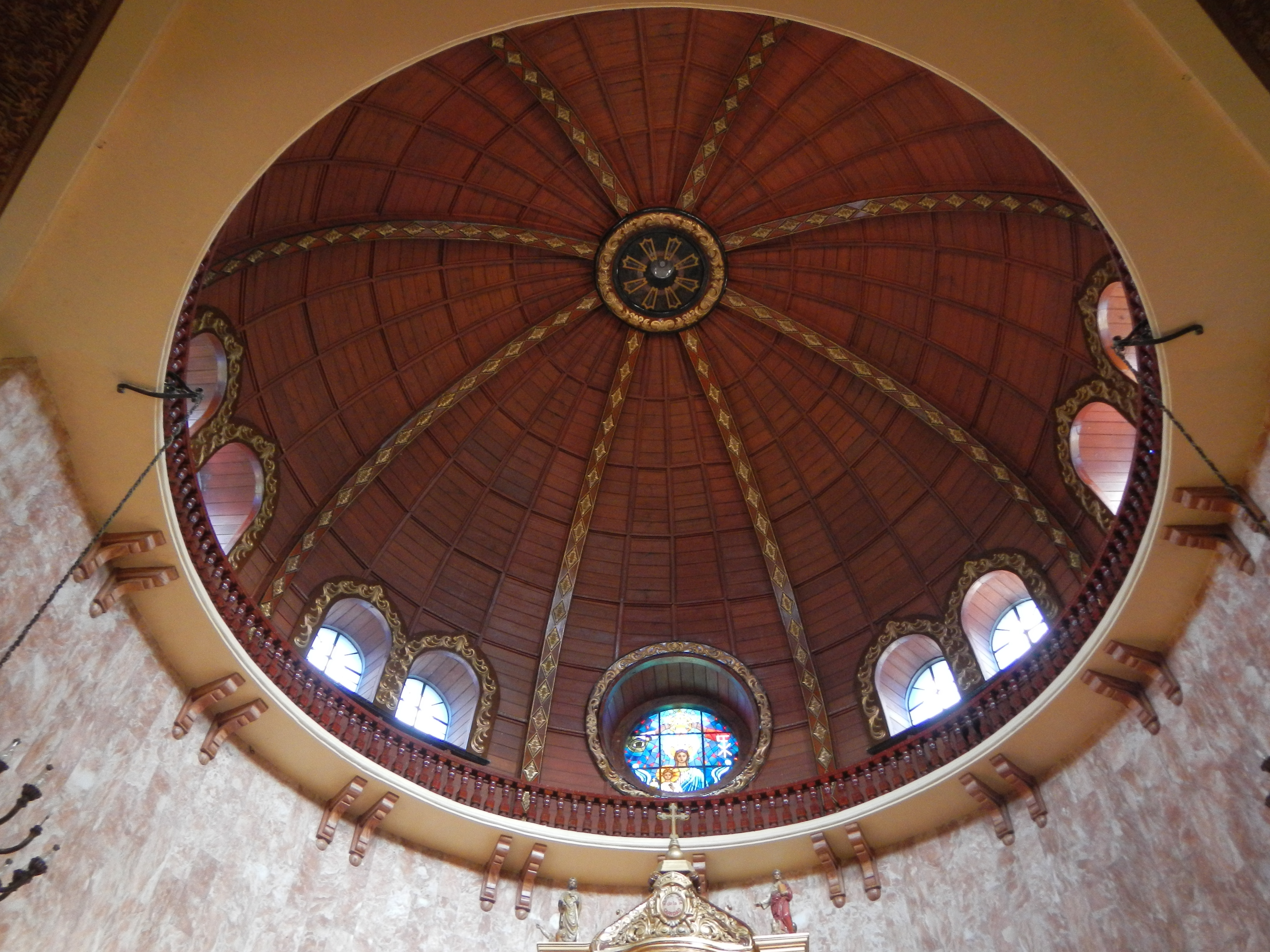
The basilica dome interior

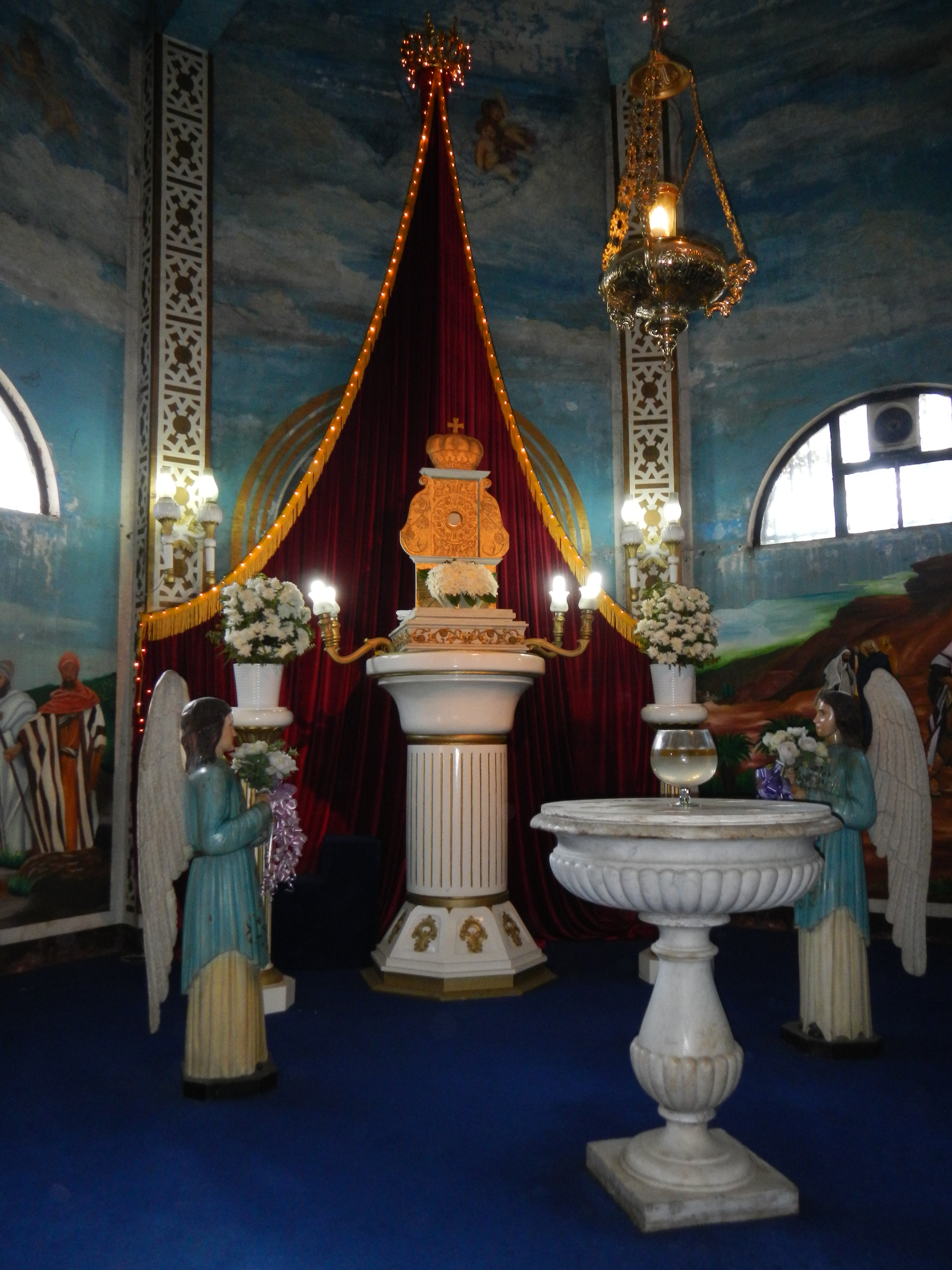
Adoration altar

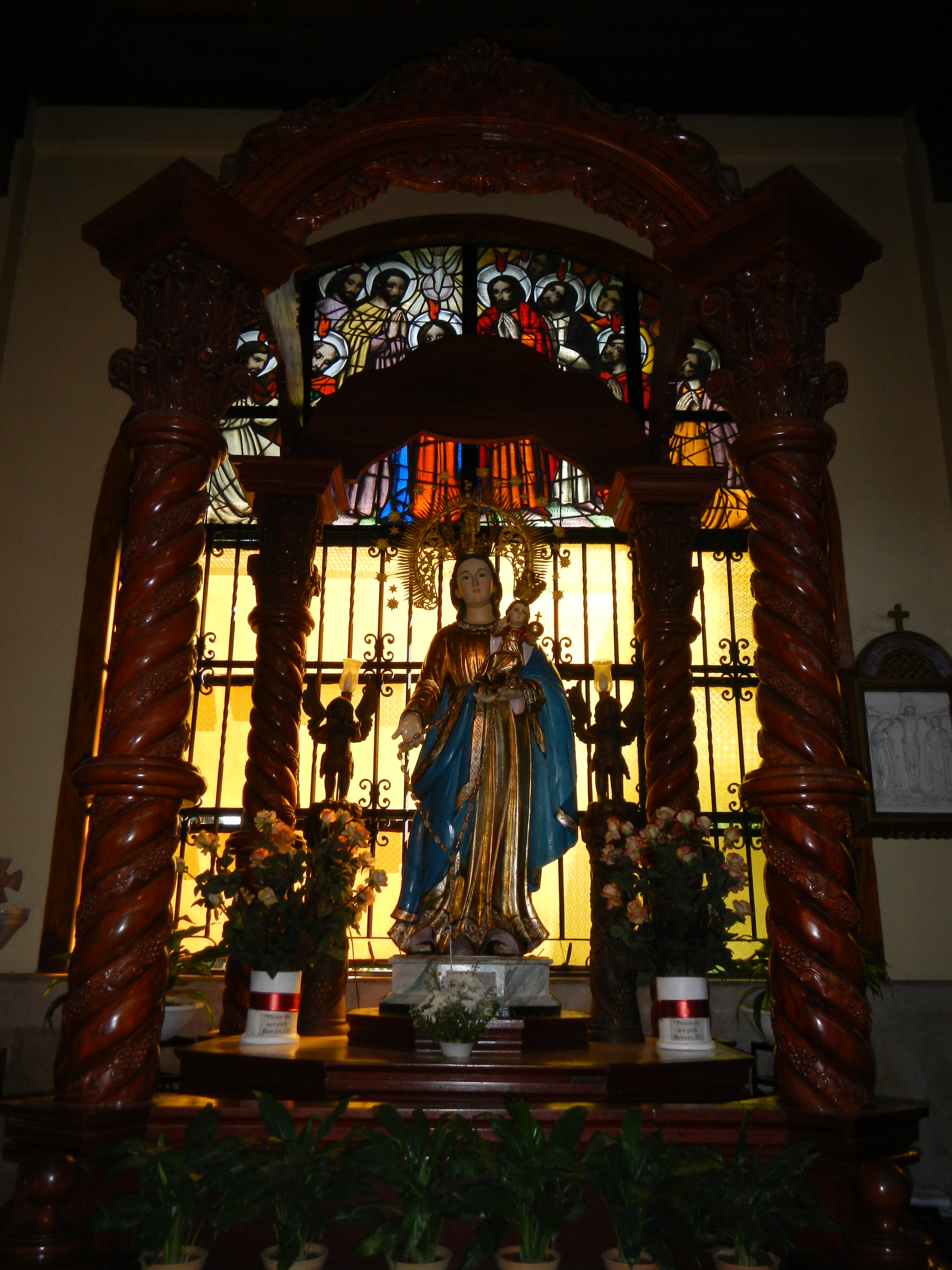
Our Lady of Charity statue

== See also ==
- List of basilicas

== Sources ==
- Layug, Benjamin Locsin (2007). A Tourist Guide to Notable Philippine Churches. Pasig, Philippines: New Day Publishers. pp. 87–89. ISBN 978-971-8521-10-6.
