= San Fernando Cathedral (La Union) =

Roman Catholic church in La Union, Philippines

- Saint William the Hermit Cathedral
- Catedral de San Guillermo el Ermitaño (Spanish)
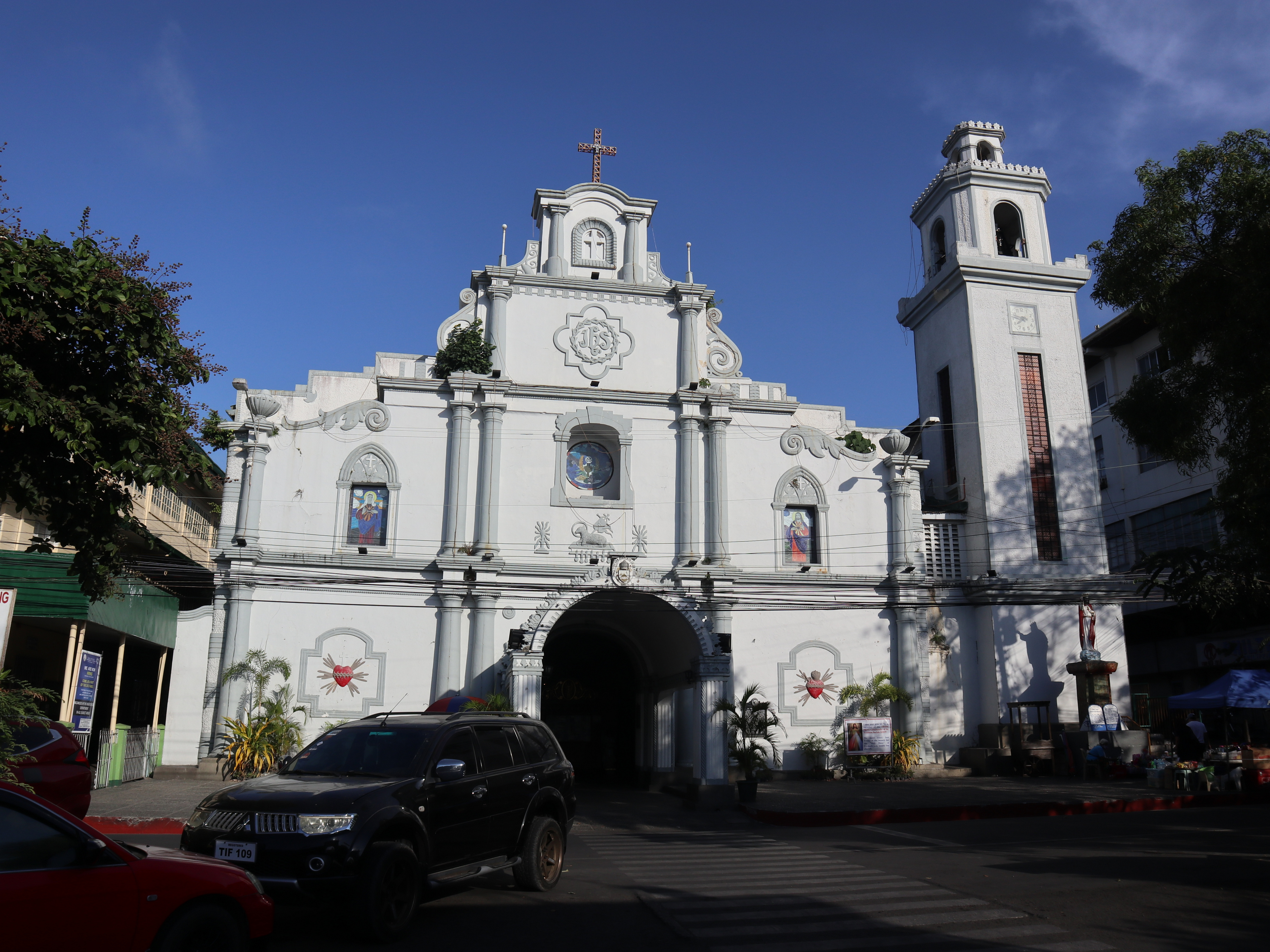
- Cathedral facade in February 2023

- Location in Luzon Location in the Philippines
- 16°36′56″N 120°19′04″E
- Location: San Fernando, La Union
- Country: Philippines
- Denomination: Roman Catholic

History
- Status: Cathedral
- Dedication: Saint William the Hermit
- Consecrated: 1817

Architecture
- Functional status: Active
- Architectural type: Church building
- Style: Neoclassical
- Groundbreaking: 1764
- Completed: 1817

Specifications
- Materials: cement and clay

Administration
- Province: Lingayen-Dagupan
- Diocese: San Fernando

Clergy
- Bishop: Daniel O. Presto

Saint William the Hermit Cathedral , commonly known as San Fernando Cathedral, is the seat of the Roman Catholic Diocese of San Fernando de La Union, in the Philippines. The diocese, which comprises the civil province of La Union, was created on January 19, 1970, and canonically erected on April 11, 1970, with Saint William the Hermit as the titular saint; it is a suffragan of the Archdiocese of Lingayen-Dagupan. Prior to the creation of the diocese, the church was formerly under the Archdiocese of Nueva Segovia.

The cathedral is located in Barangay II (Poblacion), San Fernando, La Union. The Cathedral's patron saint is William the Hermit (or William the Great), the founder of the Catholic congregation of Williamites, a branch of the Hermits of St. Augustine. The town feast is celebrated every February 10.

The cathedral's Team Ministry include Rev. Fr. Perpetuo B. Cooncepcion as the Team Ministry Moderator; Rev. Fr. Jaime G. Andres, Jr. and Rev. Fr. Bret Jan Michael P. Boadilla as Parochial Vicars; and, Rev. Fr. Arturo A. Valmonte as Attached Priest

== History ==
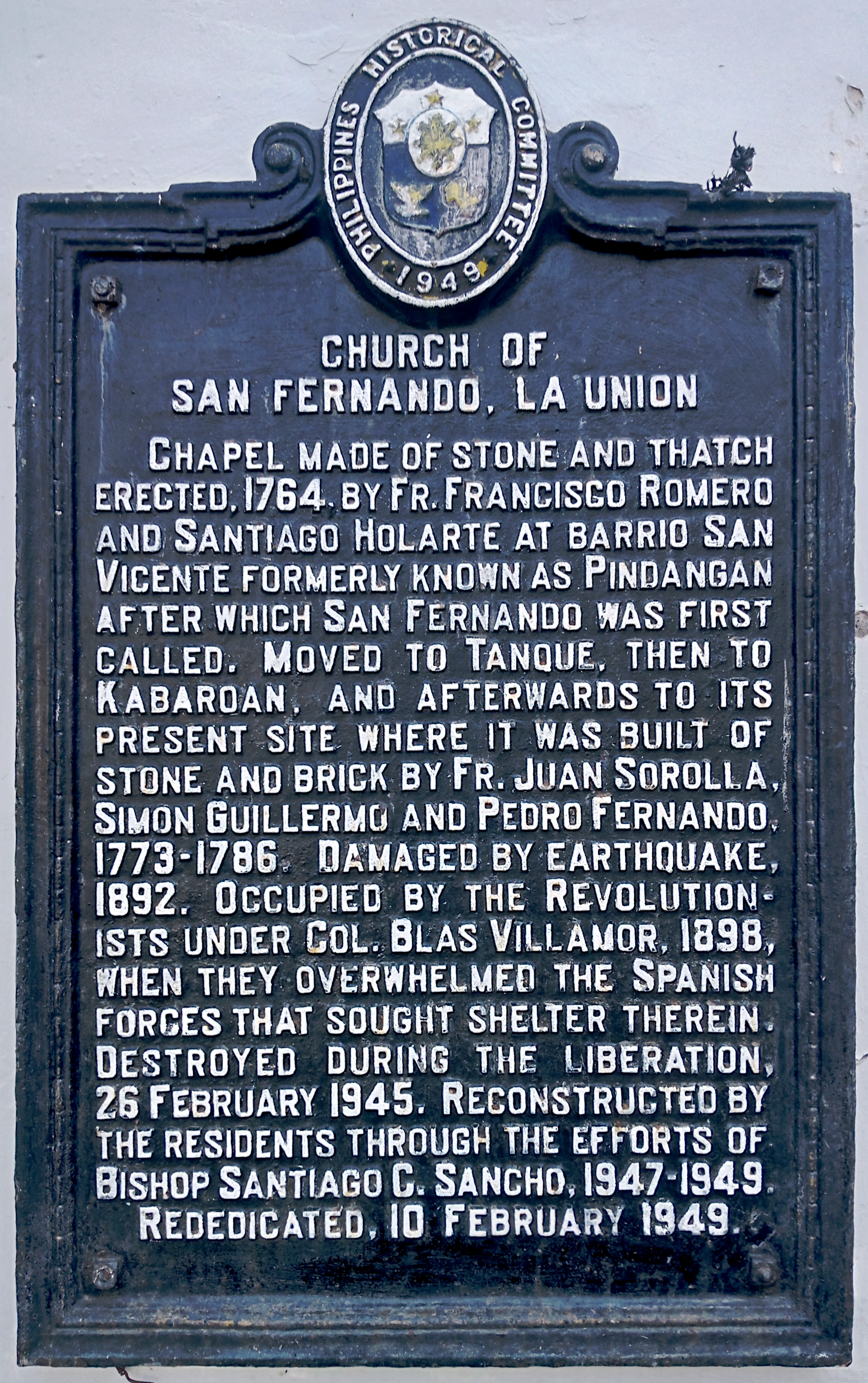
Church PHC historical marker installed in 1949

With the founding of San Fernando as a town in 1587, the mission of San Guillermo de Duladulang in 1590 was also decreed. In the barrio of San Vicente, Francisco Romero (OSA) and Santiago Olarte (OSA) initiated the building of a chapel (visita) in 1764. The friars moved the visita to Tanque and then to Kabaroan due to Mindanao's Moros and Visayan pintados raids.

In 1768, Juan Sorolla (OSA), Simon Guillermo (OSA), and Pedro Fernando (OSA) relocated the Church to its present site in the City of San Fernando. Later in 1817, Simon Torrado (OSA) erected another church and a convent.

St. William the Hermit Church was originally situated at Pindangan, now known as Barrio San Vicente. In 1759, Augustinian friar Jose Torres convinced the two settlements to fuse into Pindangan (dry fish). He and the natives built a church under the patronage of William the Hermit. In 1765, under its parish priest, Fernando Rey, Pindangan was renamed San Fernando after the Catholic King of Spain.

It was in May 1786 that the Ministerio de San Fernando was created. But due to the shortage of priests during the period of 1792 to 1831, San Fernando became a visita of Bauang and San Juan, La Union. In 1831, Juan Sorolla, the parish priest of Bauang in 1829, was assigned in San Fernando. It was only in 1817 when Simon Torrado and Sorolla, its first parish priest, constructed the church.

The church was damaged by earthquakes in 1860 and 1892 (List of earthquakes in the Philippines). In 1873, Luis Perez (OSA) destroyed the abandoned walls due to the 1860 earthquake. Jose Rodriguez Cabezas (OSA) renovated the convent and the church after the 1892 earthquake damages and added the bell tower. Katipuneros under Col. Blas Villamor and his Katipuneros sequestered the Church in 1898.

It was attacked by rebels in 1898 and the Japanese destroyed it on February 25, 1945. Rebuilt in 1873, it was again reconstructed from 1947 to 1949 under Bishop Santiago C. Sancho. (May 23, 1880 – October 23, 1966). He was the Bishop of Nueva Segovia, Philippines and was appointed Archbishop of Nueva Segovia on June 29, 1951.

The humble chapel, and later church, was ecclesiastically proclaimed a Cathedral in April 1970 during the canonical erection of the diocese of San Fernando and the appointment on February 6, 1970, of its first bishop, Victorino Cristobal Ligot (March 10, 1924 – September 18, 1980).

La Union Bishop Artemio Rillera was laid to rest behind the altar of Saint William the Hermit Cathedral on November 22, 2011, with a con-celebrated mass officiated by Lingayen-Dagupan Archbishop Socrates B. Villegas. Rillera was a missionary from the Society of the Divine Word (SVD) who died at age 69 due to severe asthma attack after saying Holy Mass at the Seminary of the Sacred Heart in San Fernando City, La Union on November 13, 2011.

Since the death of Bishop Artemio Lomboy Rillera in November 2011, the diocese had been vacant until the appointment of Bishop Rodolfo Fontiveros on October 30, 2012, as bishop of San Fernando de La Union, Philippines. Bishop Beltran had been serving as Vicar Apostolic of Bontoc-Lagawe. Beltran was born on November 13, 1948, at Gattaran-Cagayan. On March 25, 1976, he was ordained Priest Priest of Tuguegarao, Philippines, and on March 18, 2006, he was appointed Vicar Apostolic of Bontoc-Lagawe, Titular Bishop of Buffada. The Cathedral's Bishop’s Residence is located at San Vicente, City of San Fernando, La Union.

The annual fiesta celebration of the City of San Fernando La Union, the Feast of St. William the Hermit, is held every January 22 with the Agri-Trade fair (by the City Agriculture Office which promotes various agricultural products of the 59 barangays of San Fernando City, divided into 12 Districts with the 12 Councilors as collaborators). The activities lead to the feast celebration, which is observed every February 10.

== Gallery ==
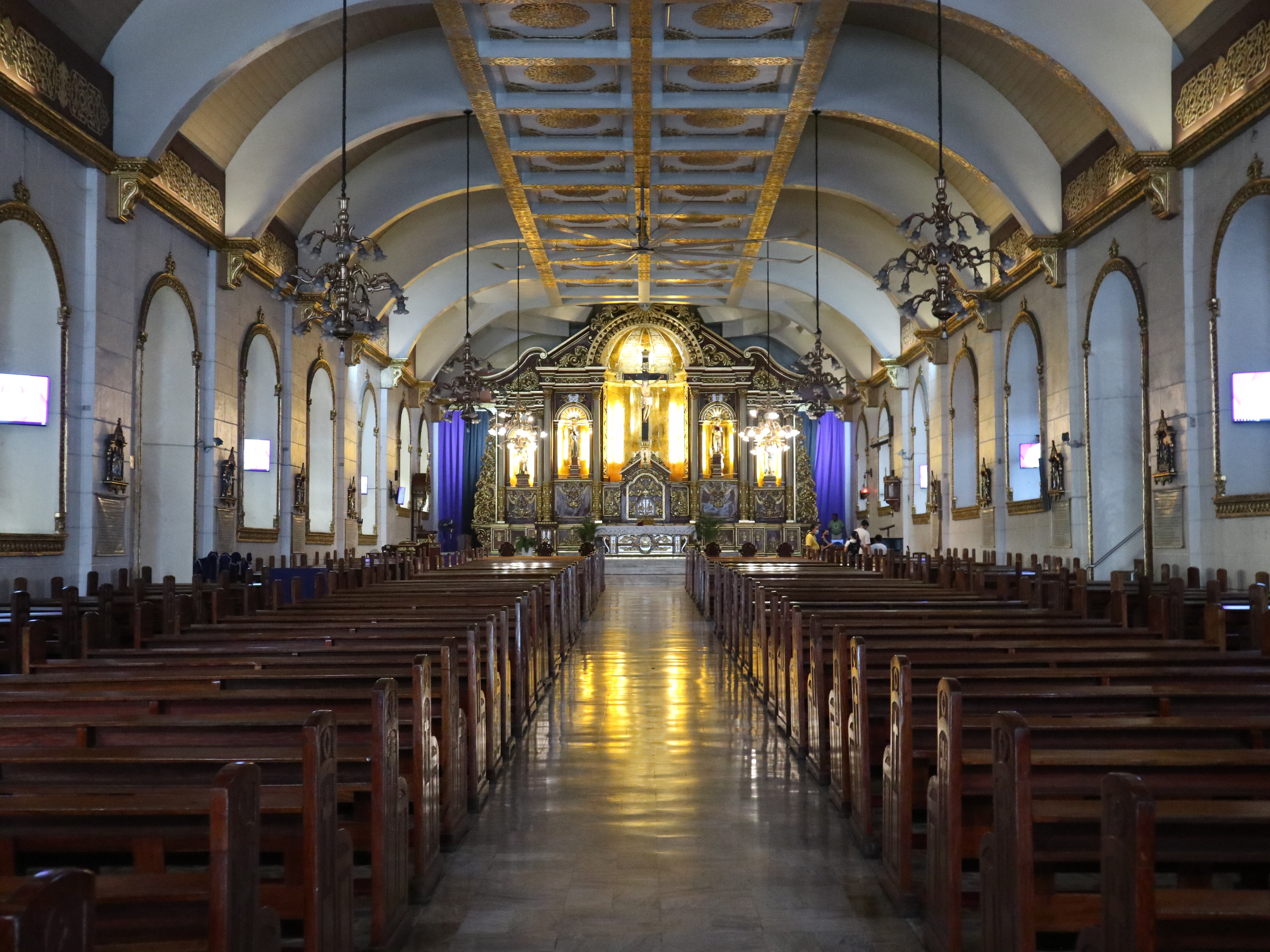
Cathedral interior in 2023

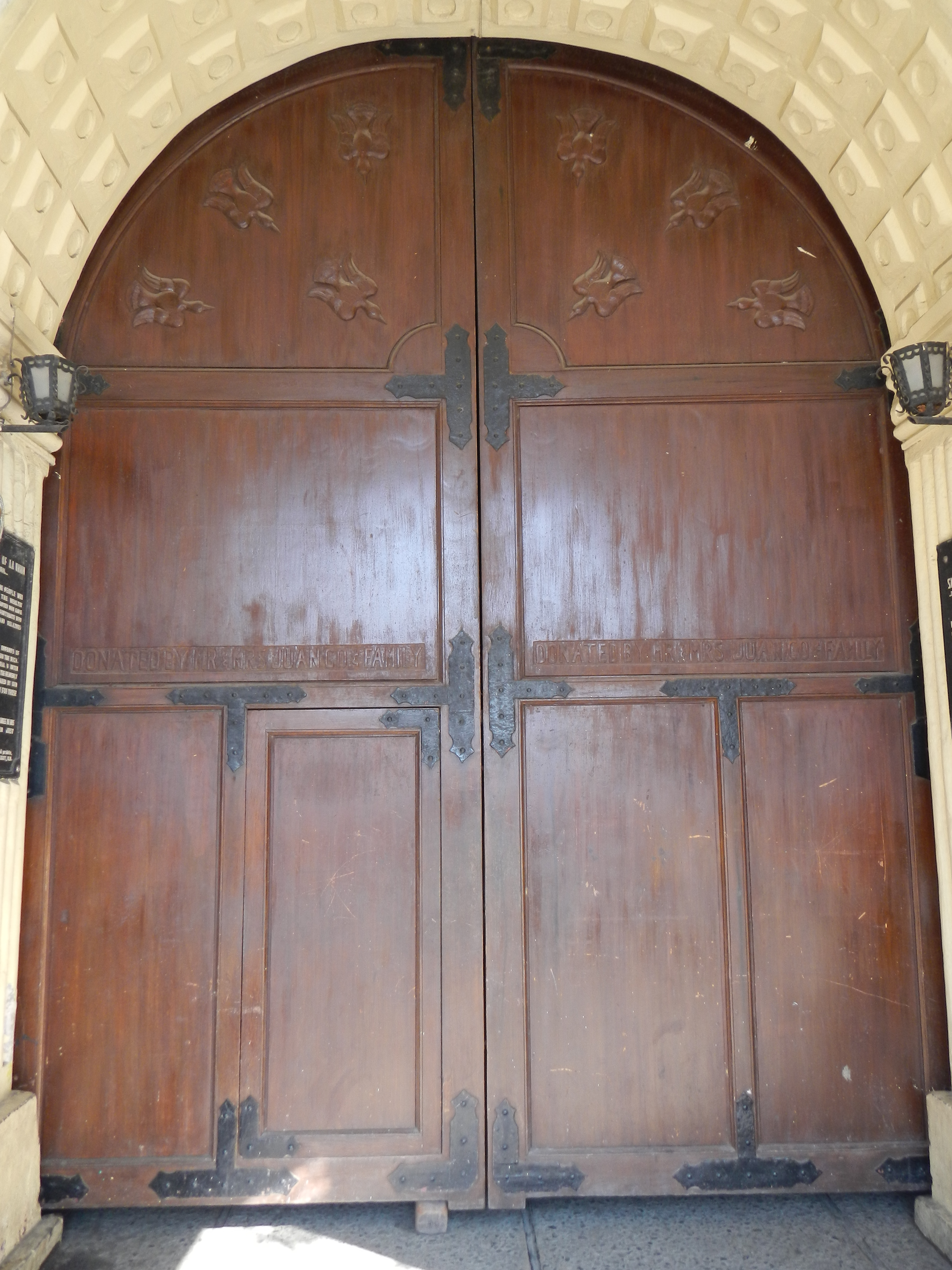
Main door

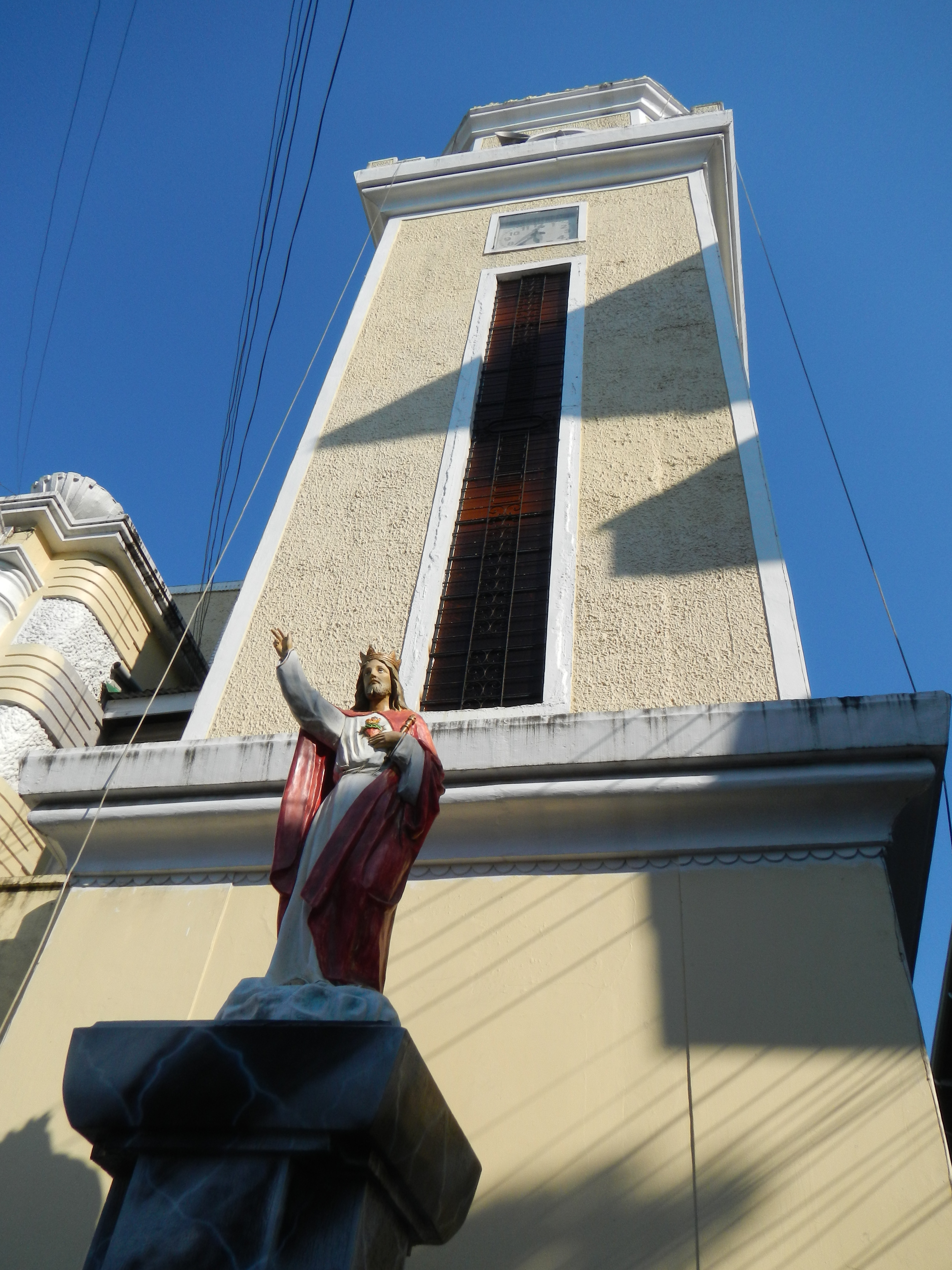
Bell tower

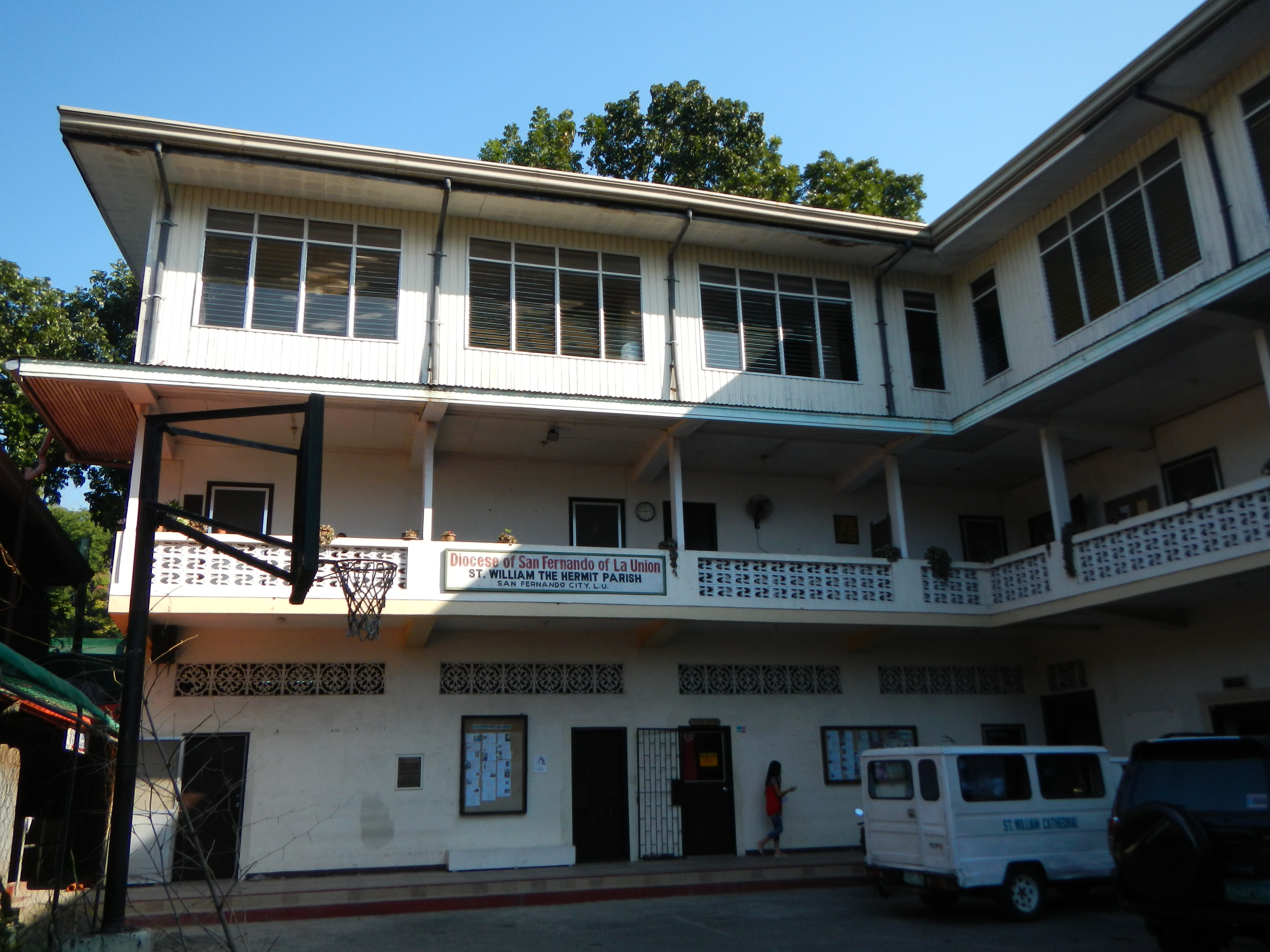
Parish convent, office and rectory

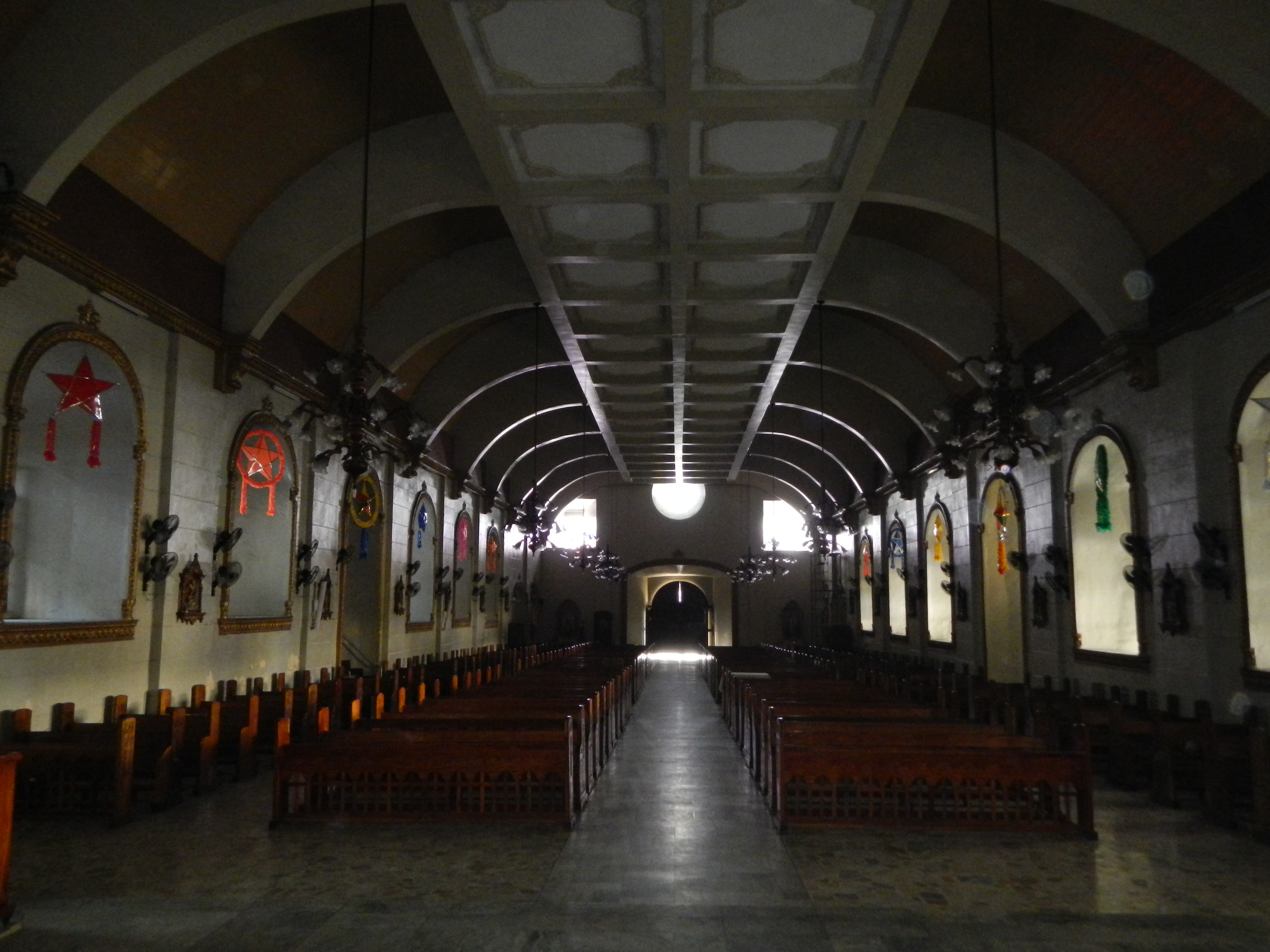
Interior from the sanctuary

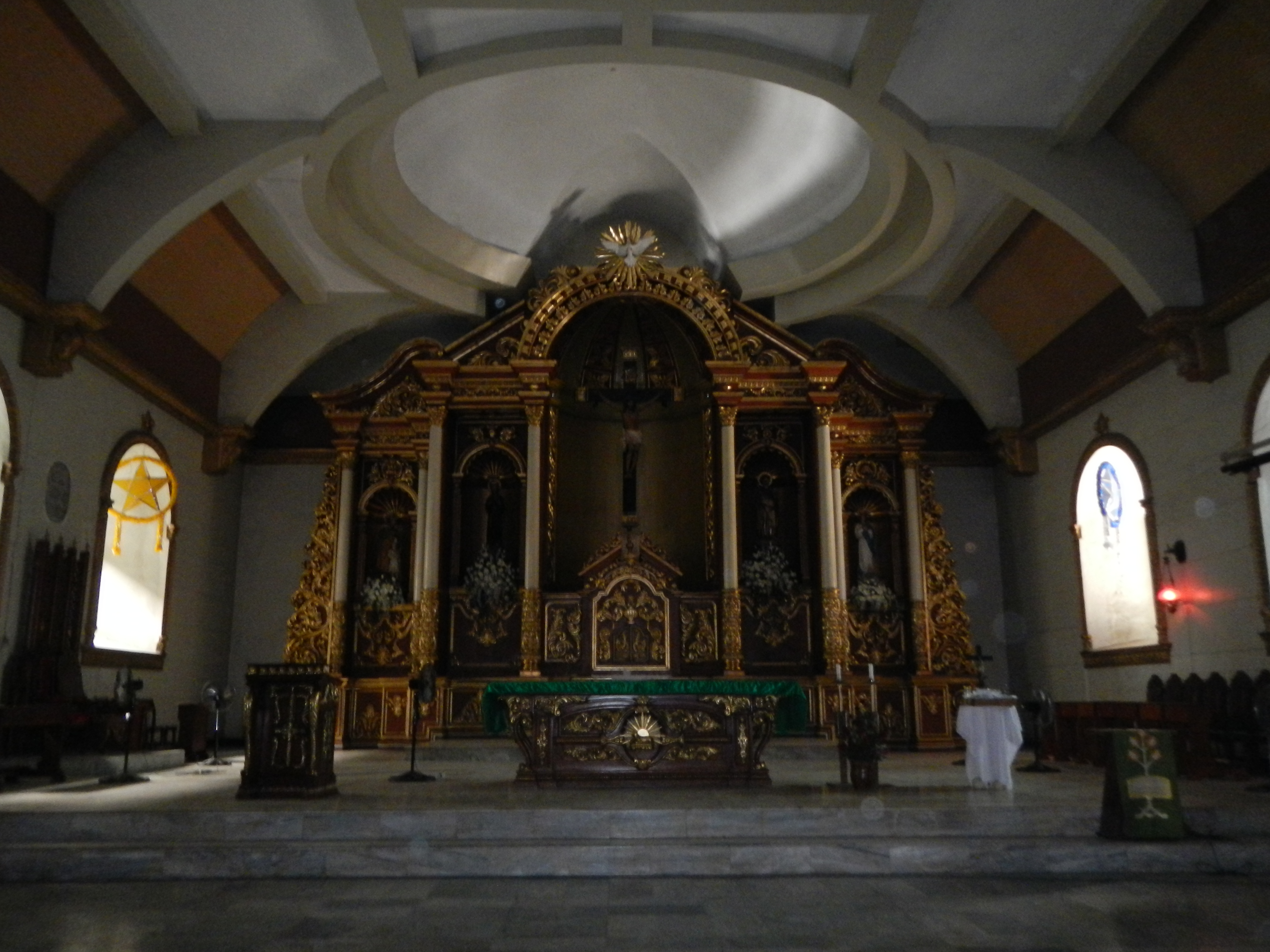
Main altar

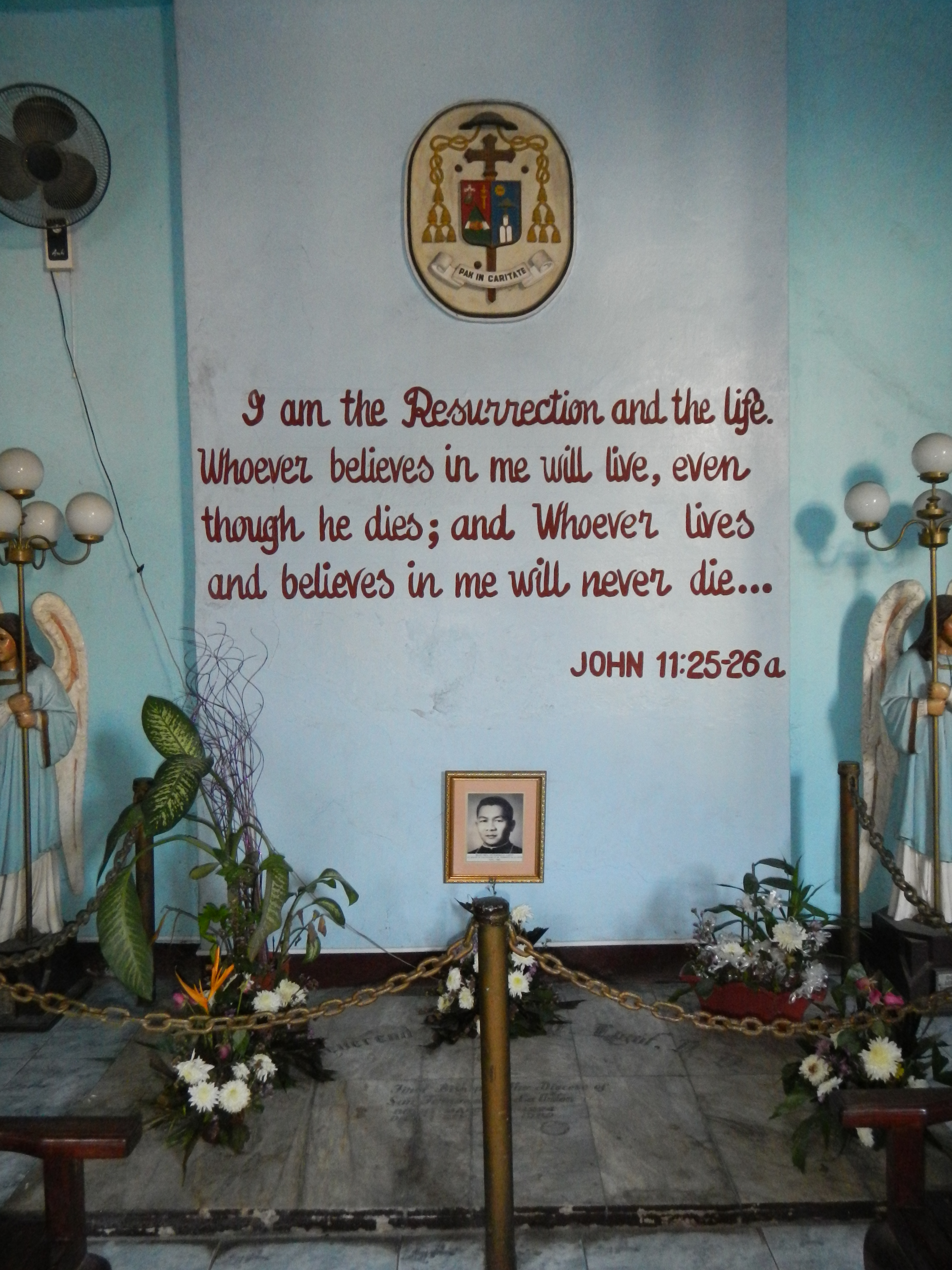
Tomb of a past bishop in the sacristy

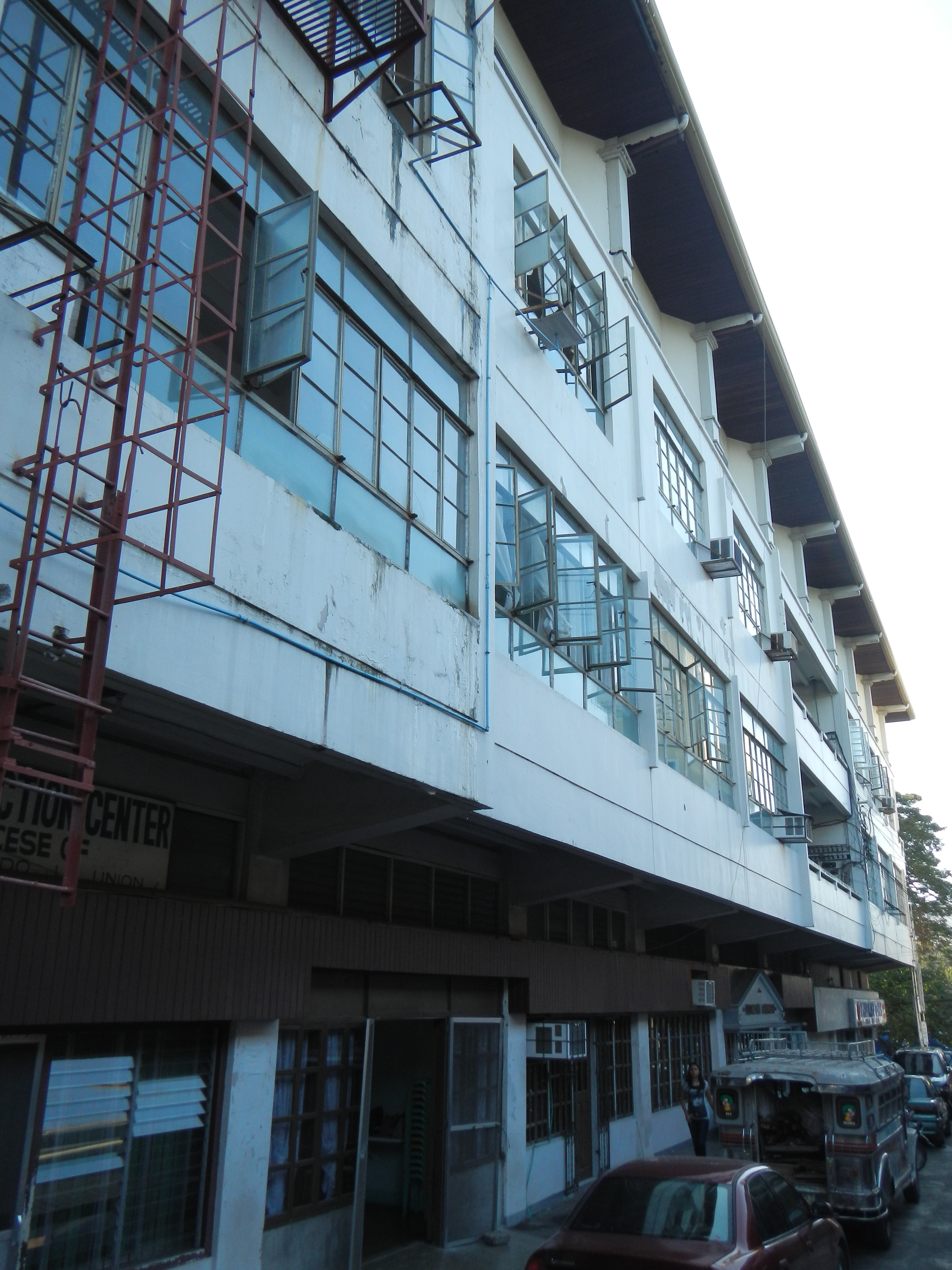
Side facade of the chancery

== Resources ==
- The 2010–2011 Catholic Directory of the Philippines (published by Claretian Publications for the Catholic Bishops' Conference of the Philippines, June 2010)
