= Diocese of San Fernando de La Union =

Latin Catholic jurisdiction in the Philippine

Diocese of San Fernando de La Unión Diœcesis Ferdinandopolitana ab Unione Diócesis ti San Fernando de La Union Diyosesis ng San Fernando de La Union Diócesis de San Fernando de La Unión

Catholic
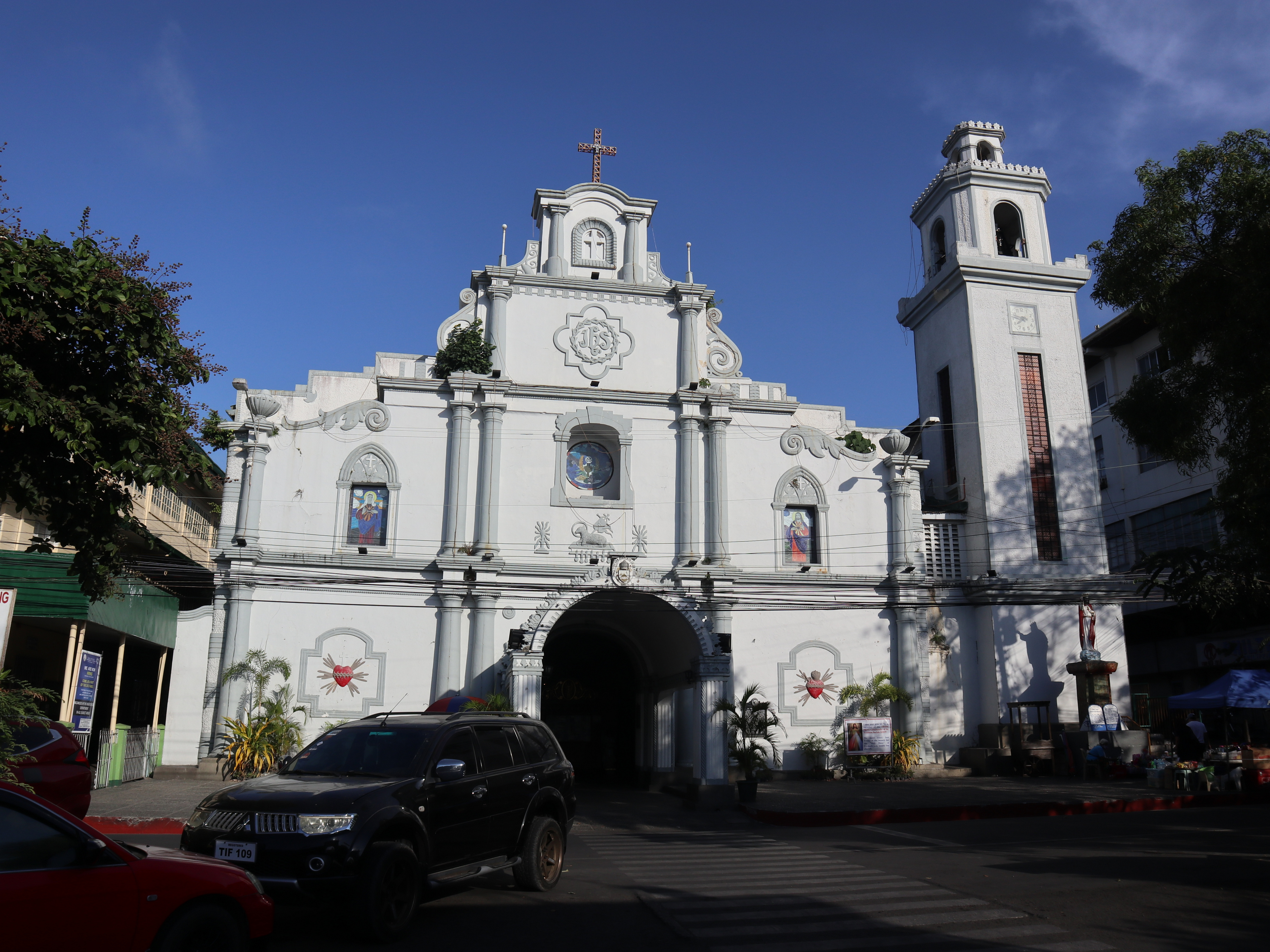
- San Fernando Cathedral, La Union

- Coat of arms

Location
- Country: Philippines
- Territory: La Union
- Ecclesiastical province: Lingayen–Dagupan
- Metropolitan: Lingayen–Dagupan
- Coordinates: 16°36′57″N 120°19′03″E

Statistics
- Area: 1,493 km^{2} (576 sq mi)
- Population: Total; Catholics: (as of 2021); 853,600; 730,300 (85.6%)

Information
- Denomination: Catholic Church
- Sui iuris church: Latin Church
- Rite: Roman Rite
- Established: 19 January 1970
- Cathedral: Cathedral-Parish of St. William the Hermit
- Patron saint: William the Hermit; Our Lady of Namacpacan

Current leadership
- Pope: Leo XIV
- Bishop: Daniel Oca Presto
- Metropolitan Archbishop: Socrates B. Villegas

Website
- dioceseofcabanatuan.org

The Diocese of San Fernando de La Union (Latin: Diœcesis Ferdinandopolitana ab Unione) is a Latin Church ecclesiastical territory or diocese of the Catholic Church in the Philippines. The diocese was established in 1970 from the Archdiocese of Nueva Segovia. It is a suffragan in the ecclesiastical province of the metropolitan Archdiocese of Lingayen–Dagupan.

== Ordinaries ==
Ordinaries of the Diocese of San Fernando de La Union
No.	Portrait	Name	Coat of Arms	From	Until	Duration	Notes
Bishops of San Fernando de La Union (6 February 1970 – present)
1		Victorino C. Ligot; 1924–1980		6 Feb 1970	18 Sep 1980	10 years, 7 months, 12 days	First bishop of the diocese. Died shortly after resignation.
2		Salvador L. Lazo; 1918–2000		20 Jan 1981	28 May 1993	12 years, 4 months, 8 days	Retired. Known for his later joining the Society of Saint Pius X and his traditionalist stance.
3		Antonio R. Tobias; 1941–		28 May 1993	25 Nov 2003	10 years, 5 months, 28 days	Appointed Bishop of Novaliches.
4		Artemio L. Rillera, S.V.D. 1942–2011		1 Apr 2005	13 Nov 2011	6 years, 7 months, 12 days	Died in office.
5		Rodolfo F. Beltran, O.P. 1948–2017		19 Jan 2013	17 Jun 2017	4 years, 4 months, 29 days	Died in office.
6		Daniel O. Presto; 1963–		9 May 2018	Incumbent	ongoing	Current bishop.

== See also ==
- Catholic Church in the Philippines
- List of Catholic dioceses in the Philippines
