= Catholic Church in the Philippines =

- Simbahang Katolika sa Pilipinas (Filipino)
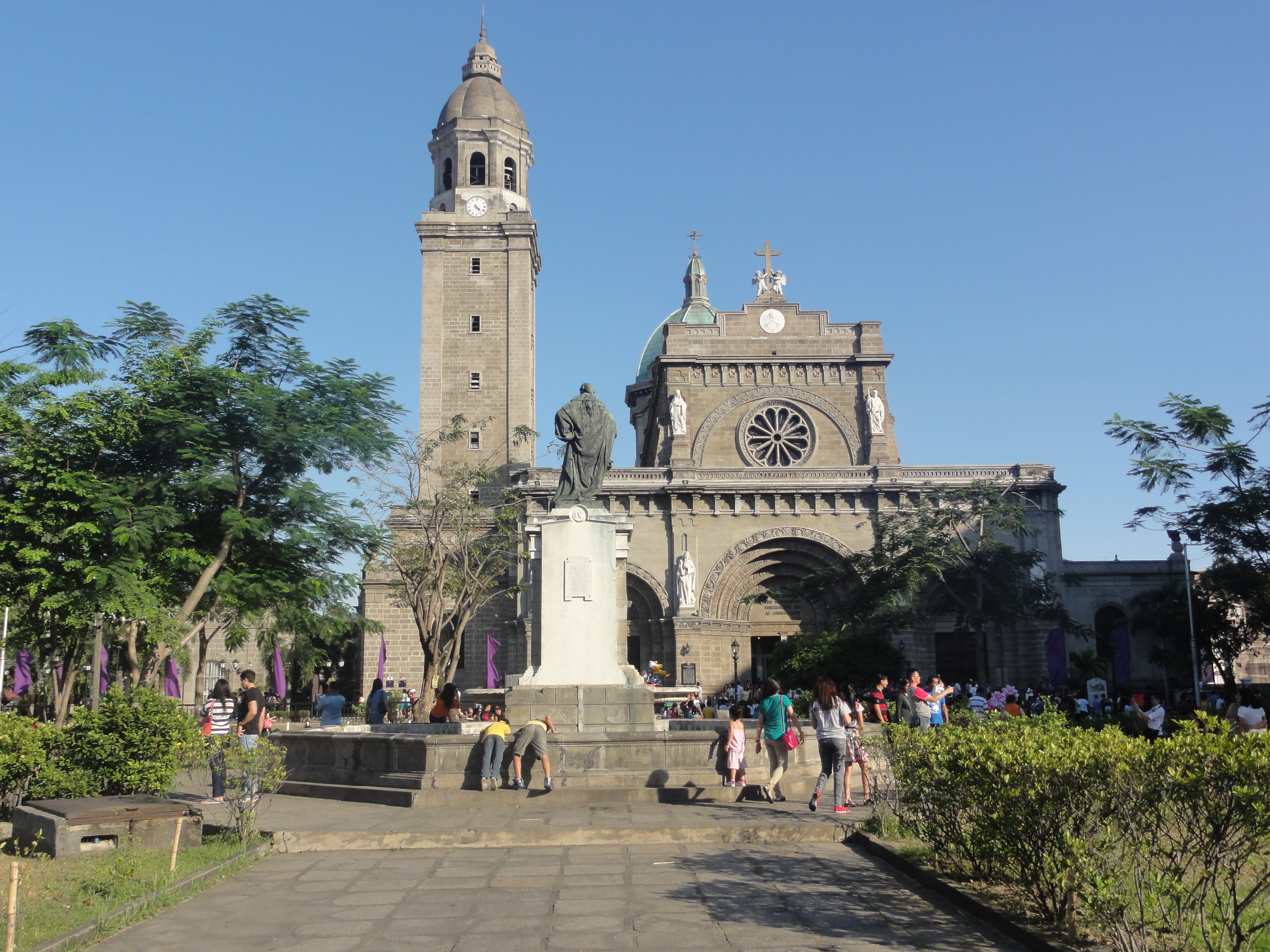
- Manila Cathedral of the Archdiocese of Manila, the oldest Catholic diocese in the Philippines
- Type: National polity
- Classification: Catholic
- Orientation: Latin
- Scripture: Bible
- Theology: Catholic theology
- Polity: Episcopal
- Governance: Catholic Bishops' Conference of the Philippines
- Pope: Leo XIV
- President: Gilbert Garcera
- Apostolic Nuncio: Charles John Brown
- Region: Philippines
- Language: Latin, Filipino, Native Philippine regional languages, English, Spanish
- Headquarters: Intramuros, Manila
- Origin: March 17, 1521; Spanish East Indies, Spanish Empire
- Branched from: Catholic Church in Spain
- Separations: Philippine Independent Church (1902); Apostolic Catholic Church (1992)
- Members: 89,000,000 (2023)
- Tertiary institutions: See list
- Seminaries: San Carlos Seminary, San Jacinto Seminary
- Other names: Roman Catholic Church in the Philippines; Iglesya Katolika or Iglesia Katolika; Simbahang Katolika; Simbahang Katolika Romana
- Official website: www.cbcponline.net www.cbcpnews.net

The Catholic Church in the Philippines (Filipino: Simbahang Katolika sa Pilipinas) is part of the worldwide Catholic Church under the spiritual leadership of the pope in Rome. The Philippines is one of the two predominantly Catholic countries in Asia, along with Timor-Leste, and has the third-largest Catholic population in the world, after Brazil and Mexico. The Catholic Bishops' Conference of the Philippines (CBCP) serves as the country's episcopal conference.

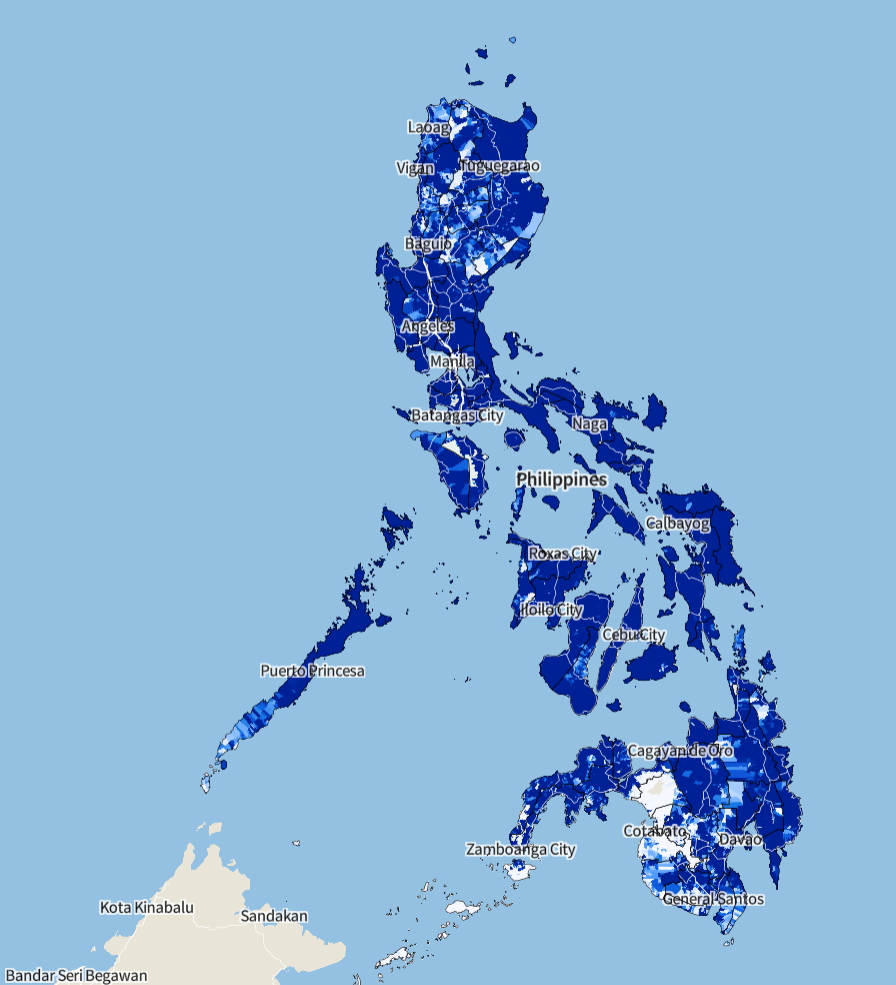
Concentration of Roman Catholics in the Philippines according to the 2020 Philippine Census at the barangay level.

Christianity, through Catholicism, was introduced to the Philippine islands by Spanish soldiers, missionaries, and settlers beginning in the early 16th century, with the arrival of Ferdinand Magellan's expedition in Cebu. During the Spanish colonial period, Catholicism served as the state religion of the Philippines. Since the American colonial period, it has been practiced within the framework of a secular state. In 2023, an estimated 89 million Filipinos, or roughly 80% of the population, were Catholics.

== History ==
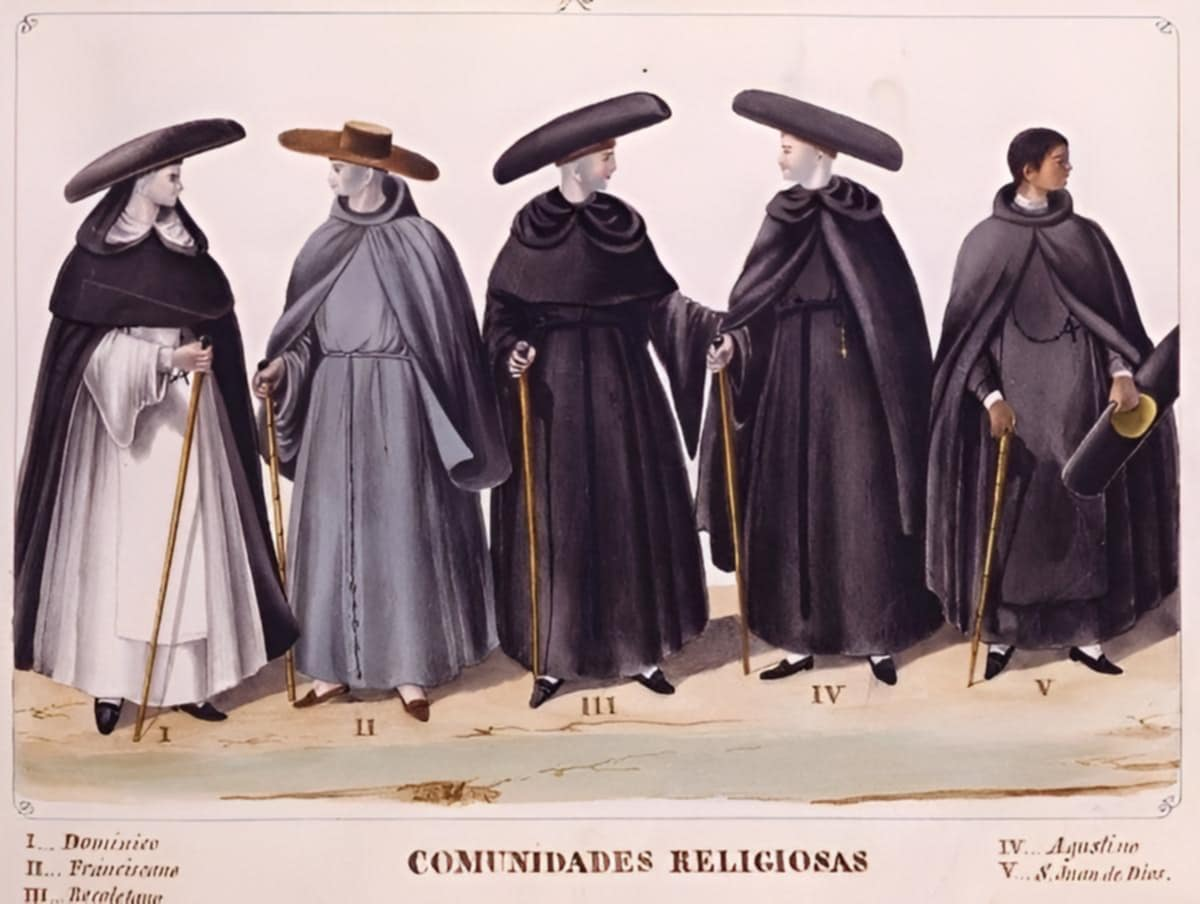
Philippine Religious Communities; I – Dominican. II – Franciscan, III – Recollect, IV – Augustinian, V – Hospitaller.

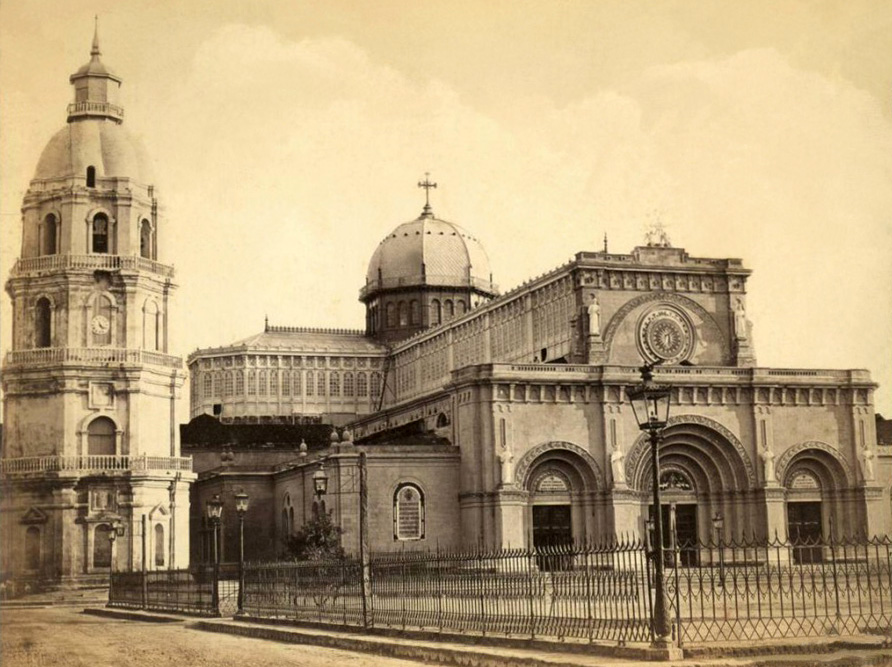
Manila Cathedral, circa pre-1900

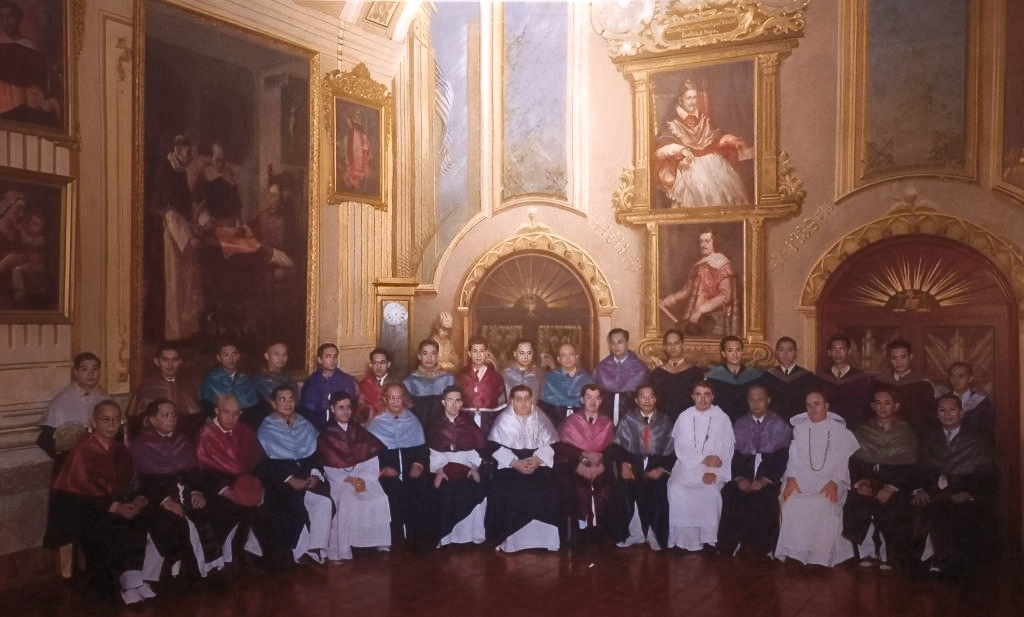
Professors inside University of Santo Tomas Manila, the oldest university in Asia.

=== Spanish Era ===
On May 4, 1493, Pope Alexander VI issued the papal bull Inter Caetera which permitted the Spanish Crown to explore and conquer parts of Asia apart from lands granted to the Portuguese. These explorations were motivated by evangelisation and finding spices. In 1519, Ferdinand Magellan set out to the explore the Pacific Ocean and arrived in the Visayan Islands in March 1521. Magellan's chronicler, Antonio Pigafetta, noted that Mass was celebrated on Easter Sunday, 31 March 1521, in Mazaua. The local rulers Rajah Colambu and Rajah Siaui were in attendance, and a cross was erected at the site. There are contentions, however, on the location of this First Mass in the Philippines with competing claims it was held in Butuan, Bolinao, and Homonhon. Missionaries then worked to evangelize the natives of Cebu and performed mass baptisms.

The Spanish Crown first entrusted the conversion of Philippine natives to the Augustinians. In 1564, the Culhuacán convent in Mexico City issued a religious warrant establishing the first branch of the order in the Philippines. In 1565, the Legazpi expedition set off from Mexico City and marked the start of Spanish rule over the Philippines, beginning with Cebu. This expedition was an effort to occupy the islands with as little conflict as possible, ordered by Phillip II. Lieutenant Legazpi set up colonies in an effort to make peace with the natives and achieve swift conquest.

Christianity expanded from Cebu when the remaining Spanish missionaries were forced westwards due to conflict with the Portuguese, and laid the foundations of the Christian community in Panay between around 1560 to 1571. A year later, the second group of missionaries reached Cebu, and the island became an ecclesiastical see and the center for evangelization. Augustinian missionary Alfonso Jiménez reached the Camarines region in southeastern Luzon via Masbate, Leyte, Samar, and Burias, planting the roots of an ecclesiastical centre in Naga City. By 1571, Fray Herrera, who was assigned as chaplain of Legazpi, had advanced further north from Panay and laid the foundations of the Archdiocese of Manila. Herrera travelled further in the Espíritu Santo and was shipwrecked in Catanduanes, where he died attempting to convert the natives. In 1572, the Spaniards led by Juan de Salcedo marched north from Manila with the second batch of Augustinian missionaries and pioneered evangelization in the Ilocos (starting with Vigan) and the Cagayan regions,

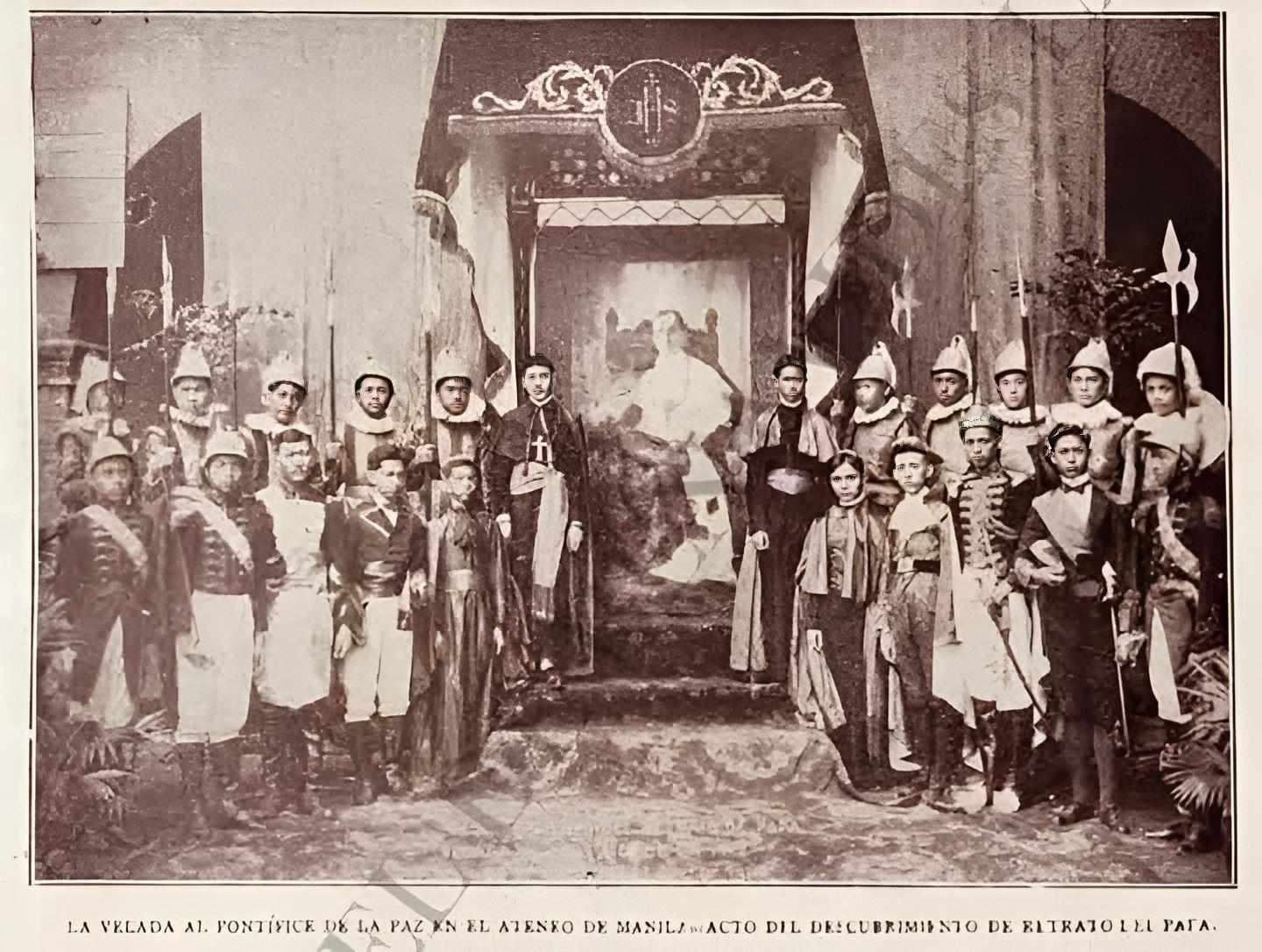
Group picture of students Ateneo de Manila Philippines. At the center is a ceremonial presence of Pope Benedict XV in the form of his portrait.

Under the encomienda system, Filipinos had to pay tribute to the encomendero of the area, and in return the encomendero taught them the Christian faith and protected them from enemies. Although Spain had used this system in America, it was not as effective in the Philippines, and missionaries were not as successful in converting the natives. In 1579, Domingo de Salazar, the first Bishop of Manila, and other clergymen were outraged because the encomenderos had abused their powers. Although the natives were resistant, they could not organize into a unified resistance towards the Spaniards, partly due to geography and ethnolinguistic differences.

With the increasing number of colonists, Spain and Mexico pressured other religious orders to join the evangelical mission started by the Augustinian in the Philippines. The Franciscans arrived in 1577, followed by the Jesuits in 1581, the Dominicans in 1587, and Augustinian Recollects in 1606.

==== Cultural impact ====
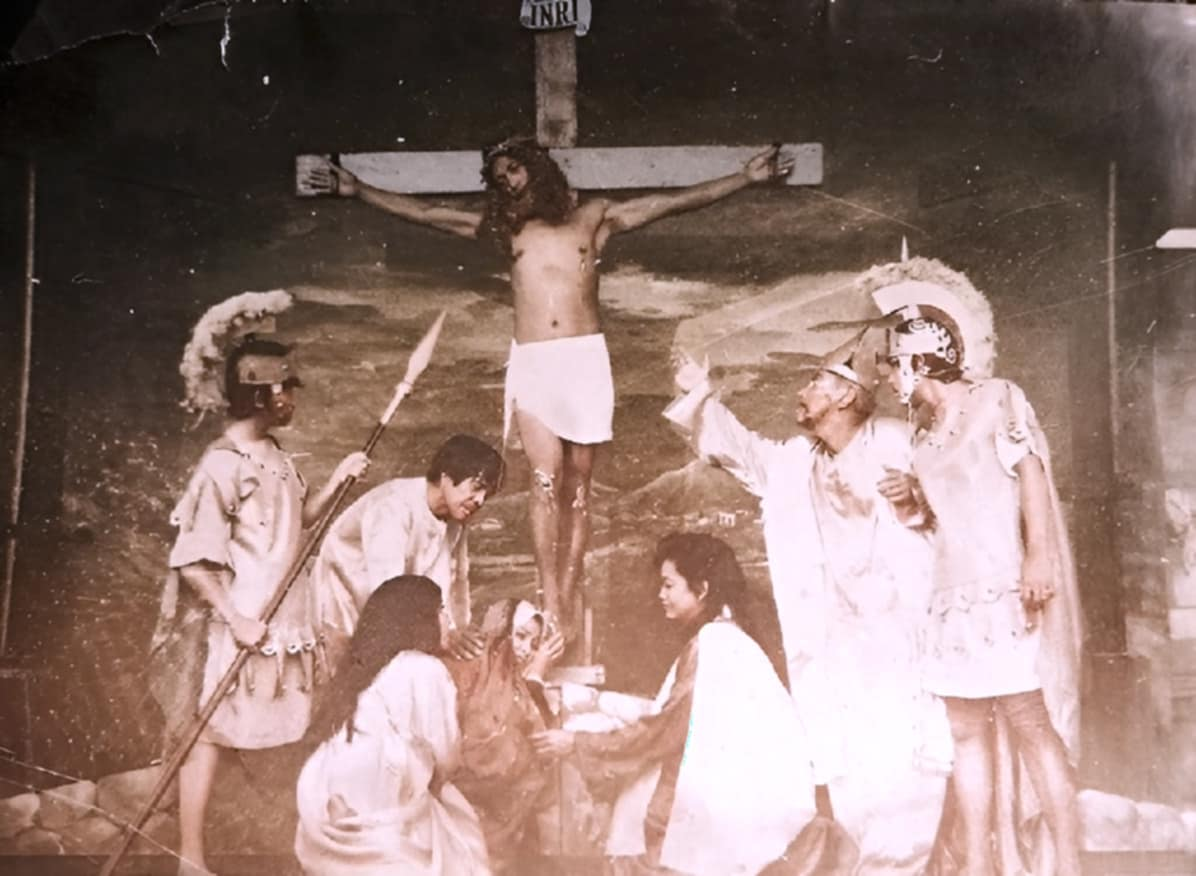
The Cenaculo, is a traditional theatrical performance that depicts the passion and death of Jesus Christ, particularly during the Semana Santa. It is a form of liturgical drama rooted in 17th and 18th-century Catholic traditions. The play combines the recitation of the "Pasyón" (a verse narrative of Christ's suffering) with theatrical elements. The traditional cenaculo attires worn by reenactors are uniquely elaborated interpretations of Greco-Roman and Judean attires from which the story sets.

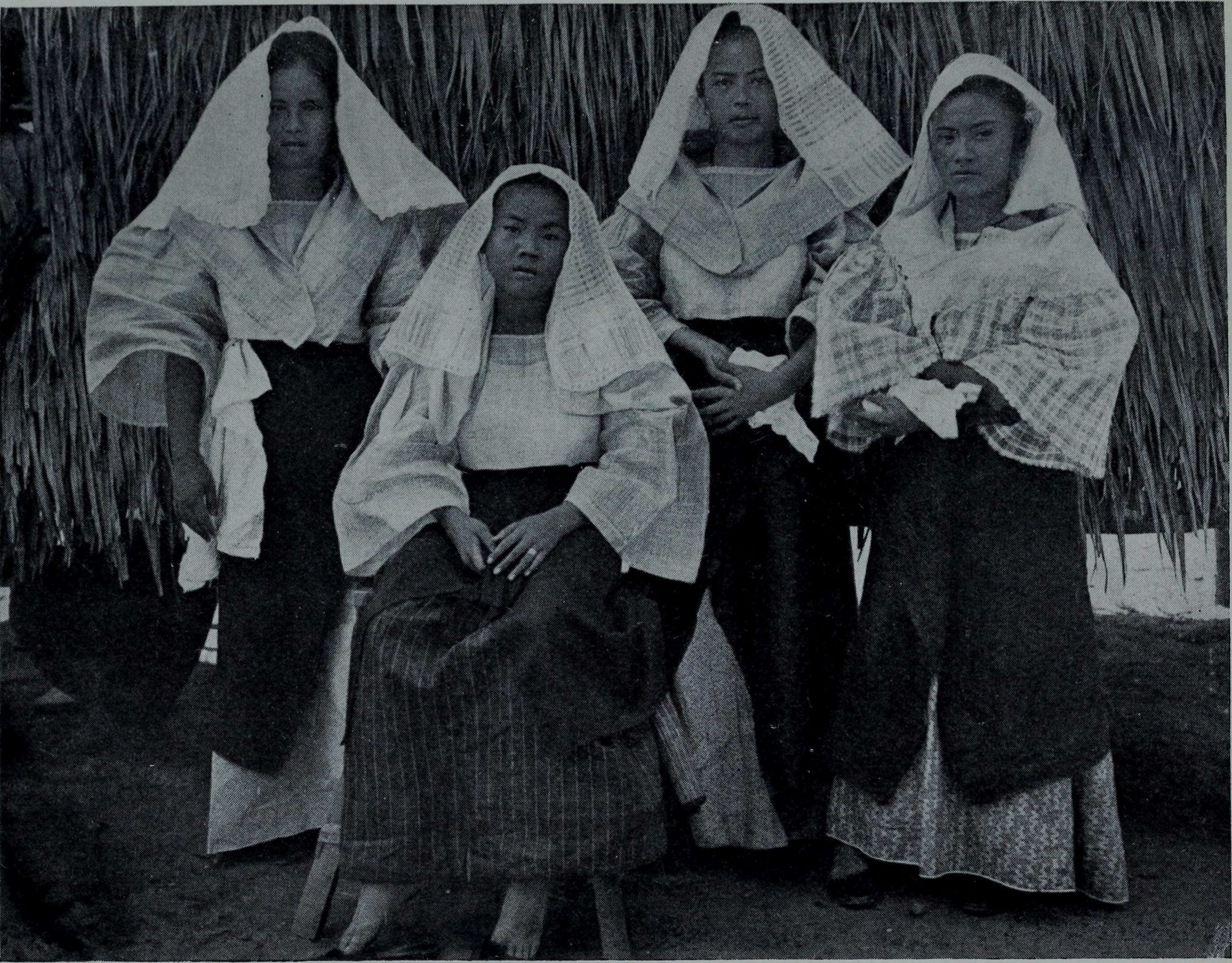
Filipinas ready for church, 1905

The Spaniards were disapproving of the lifestyle they observed in the natives. They blamed the influence of the Devil and desired to "liberate the natives from their evil ways". Over time, geographical limitations had shifted the natives into barangays, small kinship units consisting of about 30 to 100 families.

Each barangay had a mutable caste system, with any sub-classes varying from one barangay to the next. Generally, patriarchal lords and kings were called datus and rajas, while the mahárlika were the knight-like freedmen and the timawa were freedmen. The alipin or servile class were dependent on the upper classes, an arrangement regarded as slavery by the Spaniards. Intermarriage between the timawa and the alipin was permitted, which created a more or less flexible system of privileges and labor services. The Spaniards attempted to suppress this class system based on their interpretation that the dependent, servile class was an oppressed group. They failed at completely abolishing the system, but instead eventually worked to use it to their own advantage.

Religion and marriage were also issues that the Spanish missionaries wanted to reform. Polygyny was not uncommon, but was mostly confined to wealthier chieftains. Divorce and remarriage were also common as long as the reasons were justified. Accepted reasons for divorce included illness, infertility, or finding better potential to take as a spouse. The missionaries also disagreed with the practices of paying dowries, the "bride price" where the groom paid his father-in-law in gold, and "bride service", in which the groom performed manual labor for the bride's family, a custom which persisted well into late 20th century. Missionaries disapproved of these because they felt the bride price was the sale of one's daughter, and labor for bride's father allowed premarital sex between the bride and groom, which contradicted Christian beliefs.

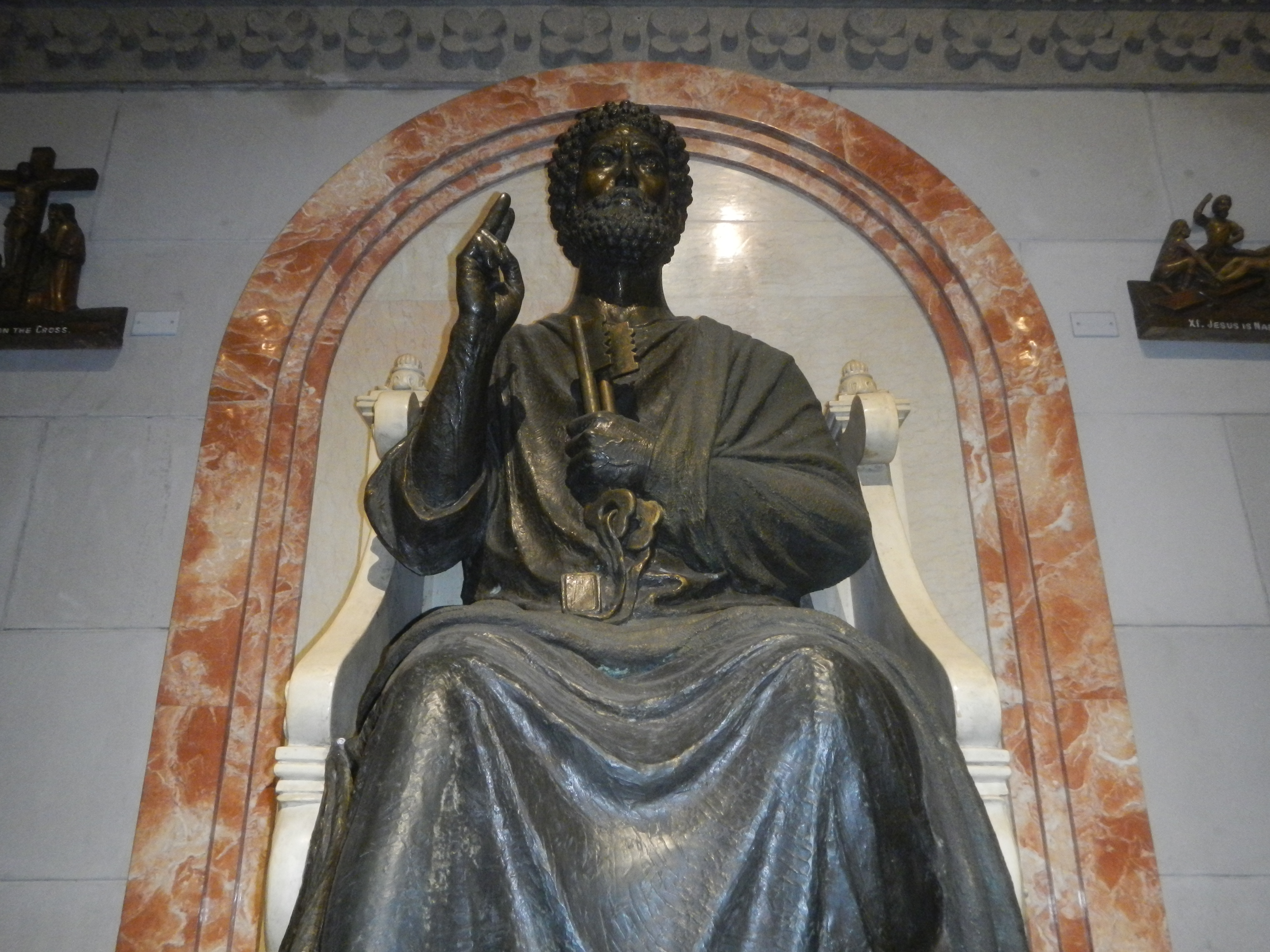
Statue of Saint Peter, Manila Cathedral

Pre-conquest, the natives had followed a variety of monotheistic and polytheistic faiths, often localized forms of Buddhism, Hinduism, Islam or Tantrism mixed with Animism. Bathala (Tagalog – Central Luzon) or Laon (Visayan) was the supreme creator deity above subordinate gods and goddesses. Native Filipinos also worshiped nature and venerated the spirits of their ancestors, whom they propitiated with sacrifices. There was ritualistic drinking and many rituals aimed to cure certain illnesses. Magic and superstition were also practiced. The Spaniards saw themselves as liberating the natives from sinful practices and showing them the correct path to God. The Filipinos have adopted Roman Catholicism but the old religions still retain a blended form therein.

In 1599, negotiation began between a number of lords and their freemen and the Spaniards. The native rulers agreed to submit to the rule of the Castilian king and convert to Christianity, and allow missionaries to spread the faith. In return, the Spaniards agreed to protect the natives from their enemies, mostly Japanese, Chinese, and Muslim pirates.

==== Difficulties ====
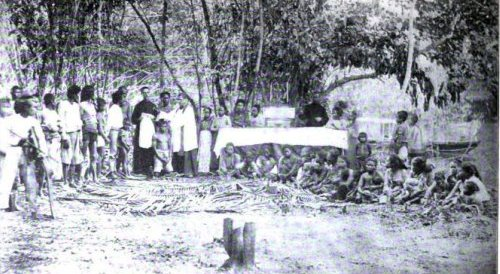
Two Spanish missionaries baptize a Moro convert to Christianity, circa 1890

Several factors slowed the Spaniards' attempts to spread Christianity throughout the archipelago. The low number of missionaries on the island made it difficult to reach all the people and harder to convert them. This was also due to the fact that the route to the Philippines was a rigorous journey, and some clergy fell ill or waited years for an opportunity to travel there. For others, the climate difference once they arrived was unbearable. Other missionaries desired to go to Japan or China instead and some who remained were more interested in mercantilism. The Spaniards also came into conflict with the Chinese population in the Philippines. The Chinese had set up shops in the Parian (or bazaar) during the 1580s to trade silk and other goods for Mexican silver. The Spaniards anticipated revolts from the Chinese and were constantly suspicious of them. The Spanish government was highly dependent on the influx of silver from Mexico and Peru, since it supported the government in Manila, to continue the Christianization of the archipelago.

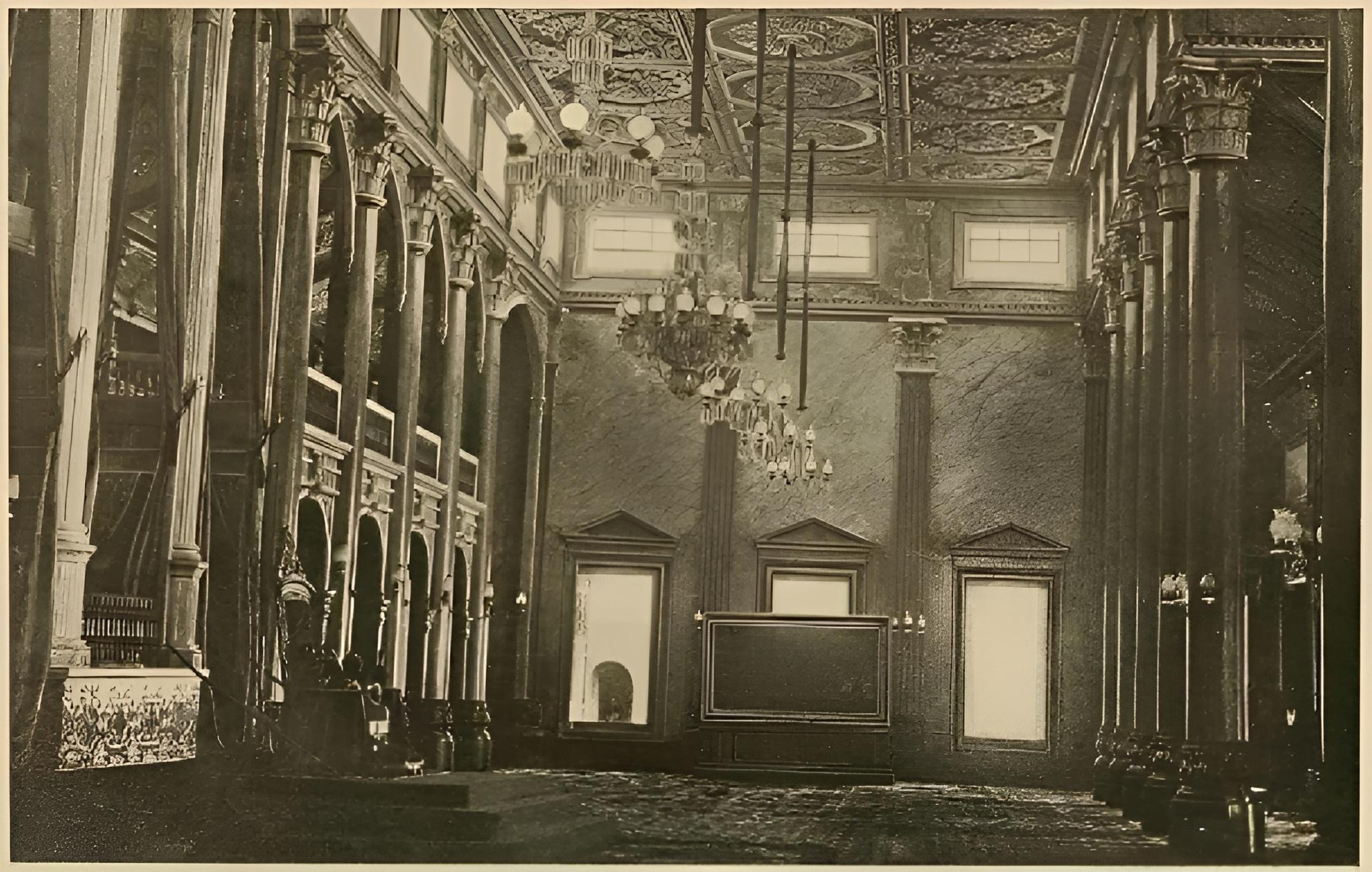
Throne Room interior of the Palacio Arzobispal in Intramuros Manila as it was during the Spanish colonial period.

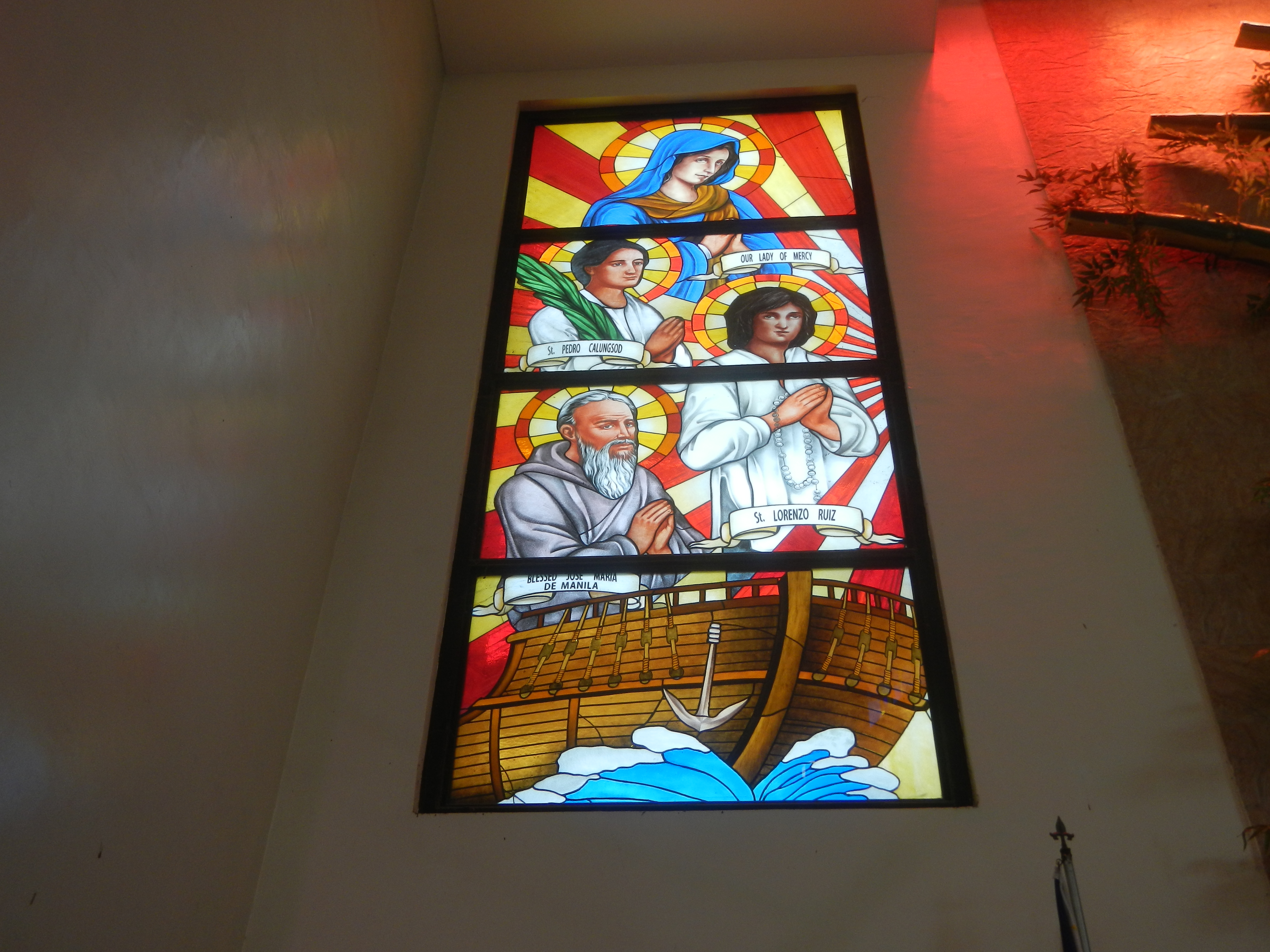
Stained glass featuring Saint Lorenzo Ruiz, Saint Pedro Calungsod, Blessed José María de Manila and Our Lady of Mercy in Shrine of Saint Andrew Kim in Bocaue, Bulacan.

The most difficult challenges for the missionaries were the dispersion of the Filipinos and the wide variety of languages and dialects. The geographical isolation forced the Filipino population into numerous small villages, and every other province supported a different language. Furthermore, frequent privateering from Japanese Wokou pirates and slave-raiding by Muslims blocked Spanish attempts to Christianize the archipelago, and to offset the disruption of continuous warfare with them, the Spanish militarized the local populations, importing soldiers from Latin America, and constructed networks of fortresses across the islands. As the Spanish and their local allies were in a state of constant war against pirates and slavers, the Philippines became a drain on the Vice-royalty of New Spain in Mexico City, which paid to maintaining control of Las Islas Filipinas in lieu of the Spanish crown.

The Santo Niño de Cebú, the oldest Christian artifact in the Philippines. In 1521, Ferdinand Magellan gave this statue to a Cebuano chieftain that converted to Christianity

==== Religious orders ====
The Philippines is home to many of the world's major religious congregations, these include the Rogationists of the Heart of Jesus, the Redemptorists, Augustinians, Recollects, Jesuits, Dominicans, Benedictines, Comboni Missionaries, Franciscans, Carmelites, Divine Word Missionaries, De La Salle Christian Brothers, Salesians of Don Bosco, the indigenous Religious of the Virgin Mary, and Clerics Regular of St. Paul are known as Barnabites.

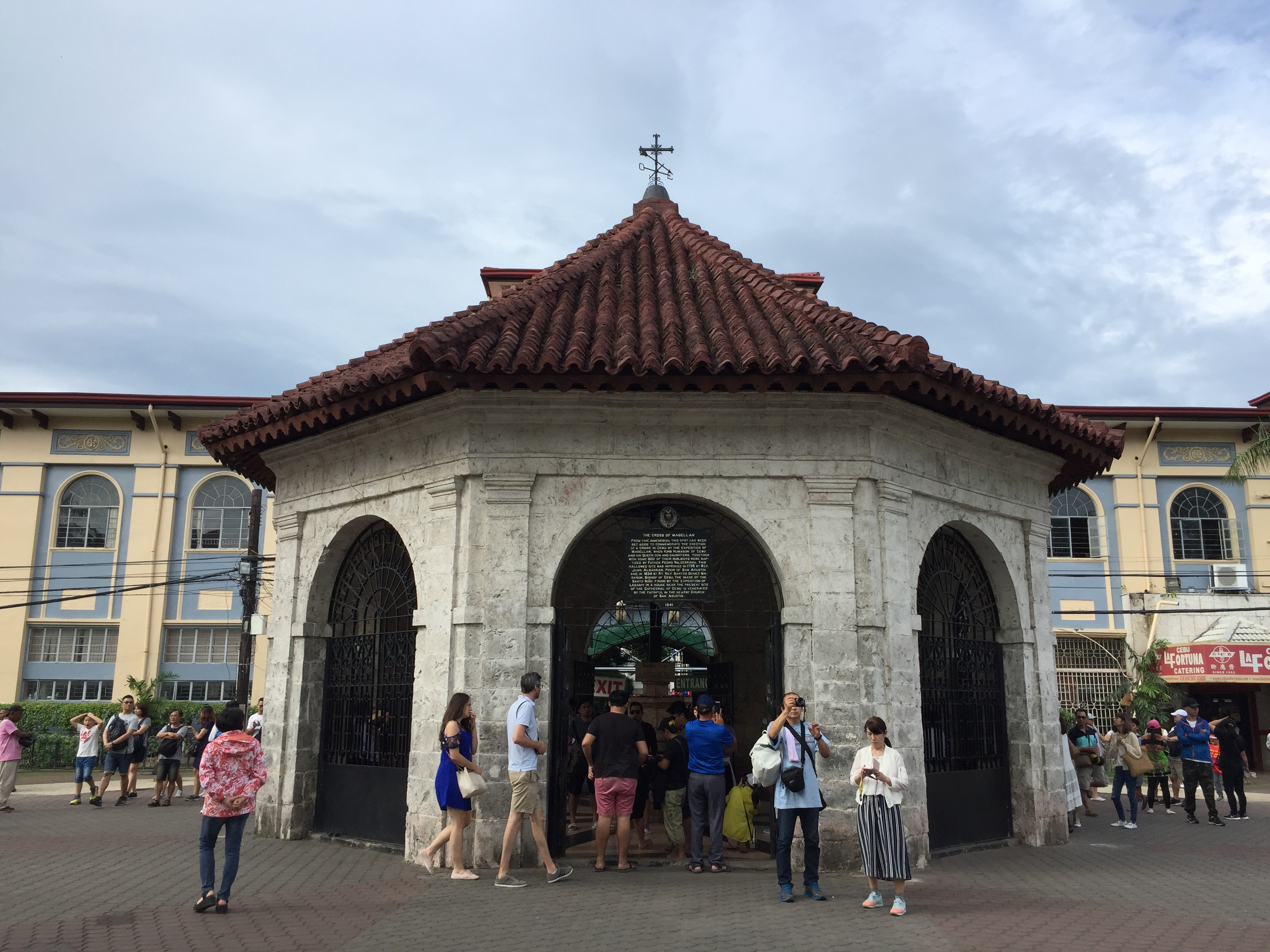
Magellan's Cross outside of the Basilica del Santo Niño, Cebu City. The Cross is a symbol of the introduction of Christianity to the islands.

During the Spanish colonial period, the five earliest regular orders assigned to Christianize the natives were the Augustinians, who came with Legazpi, the Discalced Franciscans (1578), the Jesuits (1581), the Dominican friars (1587) and the Augustinian Recollects (simply called the Recoletos, 1606). In 1594, all had agreed to cover a specific area of the archipelago to deal with the vast dispersion of the natives. The Augustinians and Franciscans mainly covered the Tagalog country while the Jesuits had a small area. The Dominicans encompassed the Parian. The provinces of Pampanga and Ilocos were assigned to the Augustinians. The province of Camarines went to the Franciscans. The Augustinians and Jesuits were also assigned the Visayan Islands. The Christian conquest had not reached Mindanao due to a highly resistant Muslim community that existed pre-conquest. Although Christian conversion was successful in recently Islamized Manila wherein Islam had not yet been deeply entrenched, as well as Zamboanga City wherein high efforts expounded by Spain and Latin America, was exercised in order to Christianize the militantly Muslim Moros.

The task of the Spanish missionaries, however, was far from complete. By the seventeenth century, the Spaniards had created about 20 large villages and almost completely transformed the native lifestyle. For their Christian efforts, the Spaniards justified their actions by claiming that the small villages were a sign of barbarism and only bigger, more compact communities allowed for a richer understanding of Christianity. The Filipinos faced much coercion; the Spaniards knew little of native rituals. The layout of these villages was in gridiron form that allowed for easier navigation and more order. They were also spread far enough to allow for one cabecera or capital parish, and small visita chapels located throughout the villages in which clergy only stayed temporarily for Mass, rituals, or nuptials.

The Philippines served as a base for sending missions to other Asian and Pacific countries such as China, Japan, Formosa, Indochina, and Siam.

=== American period: 1898–1946 ===
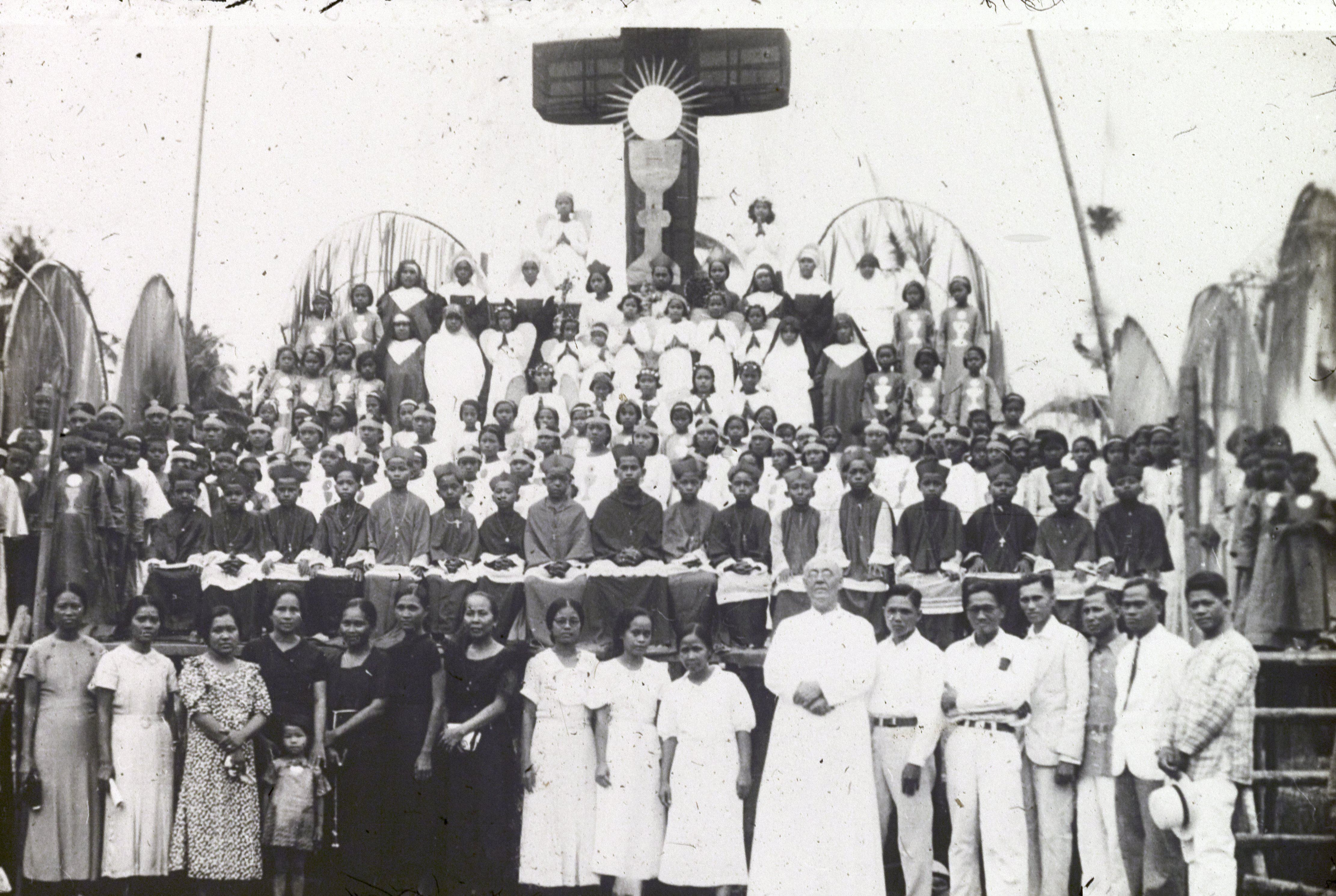
Catholic ceremony in the Philippines, circa pre-1930

When the Spanish clergy were driven out in 1898, there were so few indigenous clergy that the Catholic Church in the Philippines was in imminent danger of complete ruin. Under American administration, the situation was saved and the proper training of Filipino clergy was undertaken. In 1906, Jorge Barlin was consecrated as the Bishop of Nueva Caceres, making him the first Filipino bishop of the Catholic Church.

During the sovereignty of the United States, the American government implemented the separation of church and state, which reduced the significant political power exerted by the Catholic Church and led to the establishment of other faiths (particularly Protestantism) within the country. A provision of the 1935 Philippine Constitution mimicked the First Amendment to the United States Constitution and added the sentences: "The exercise and enjoyment of religious profession and worship, without discrimination or preference, shall be forever allowed. No religious test shall be required for the exercise of civil political rights." But the Philippine experience has shown that this theoretical wall of separation has been crossed several times by secular authorities and culturally the Western church and state separation has been viewed as blasphemous among the Filipino people.

It was during the American Period when newer religious orders arrived in the Philippines. The Spanish friars gradually fled by the hundreds and left parishes without pastors. This prompted bishops to ask for non-Spanish Religious Congregations to set up foundations in the Philippines and help augment the lack of pastors. The American Jesuits and other religious orders from their American province filled the void left by their Spanish counterparts, creating a counterbalance to the growth of Protestant congregations by American Protestant missionaries.

=== 1946–present ===
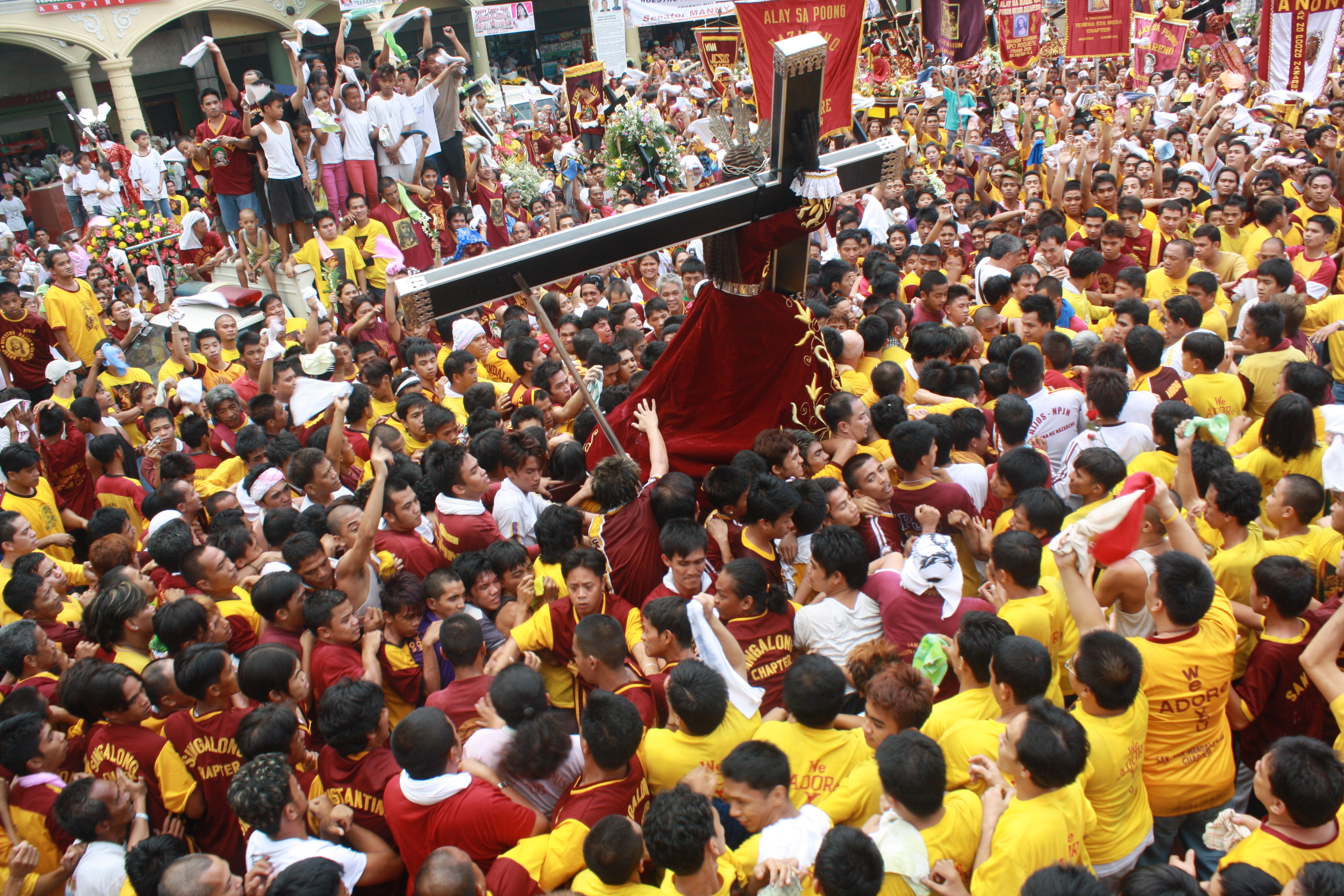
Catholic procession of the Black Nazarene in Manila, 2010

After the war, most of the religious orders resumed their ecclesiastical duties and helped in the rehabilitation of towns and cities ravaged by war. Classes in Catholic schools run by religious orders resumed, with American priests specializing in academic and scientific fields fulfilling faculty roles until the mid-1970s. American and foreign bishops were gradually succeeded by Filipino bishops by the 1950s.

The Second Vatican Council from 1962 to 1965 instituted a dramatic change for the Catholic Church in the Philippines, transforming the Latin Spanish church imposed upon the country to a Filipino church deeply rooted in Philippine culture and language.

When the Philippines was placed under Martial Law by 10th president and dictator Ferdinand Marcos Sr., relations between Church and State changed dramatically, as some bishops expressly and openly opposed Martial Law. The turning point came in 1986 when the CBCP President and then-Archbishop of Cebu Cardinal Ricardo Vidal appealed to the Filipinos and the bishops against the government and the fraudulent result of the snap election; with him was then-Archbishop of Manila Cardinal Jaimé Sin, who broadcast over church-owned Radio Veritas a call for people to support anti-regime rebels. The people's response became what is now known as the People Power Revolution, which ousted Marcos.

Church and State today maintain generally cordial relations despite differing opinions over specific issues. With the guarantee of religious freedom in the Philippines, the Catholic clergy subsequently remained in the political background as a source of moral influence, especially during elections. Political candidates continue to court the clergy and religious leaders for support. In the 21st century, Catholic practice ranges from traditional orthodoxy, to Folk Catholicism and Charismatic Catholicism.

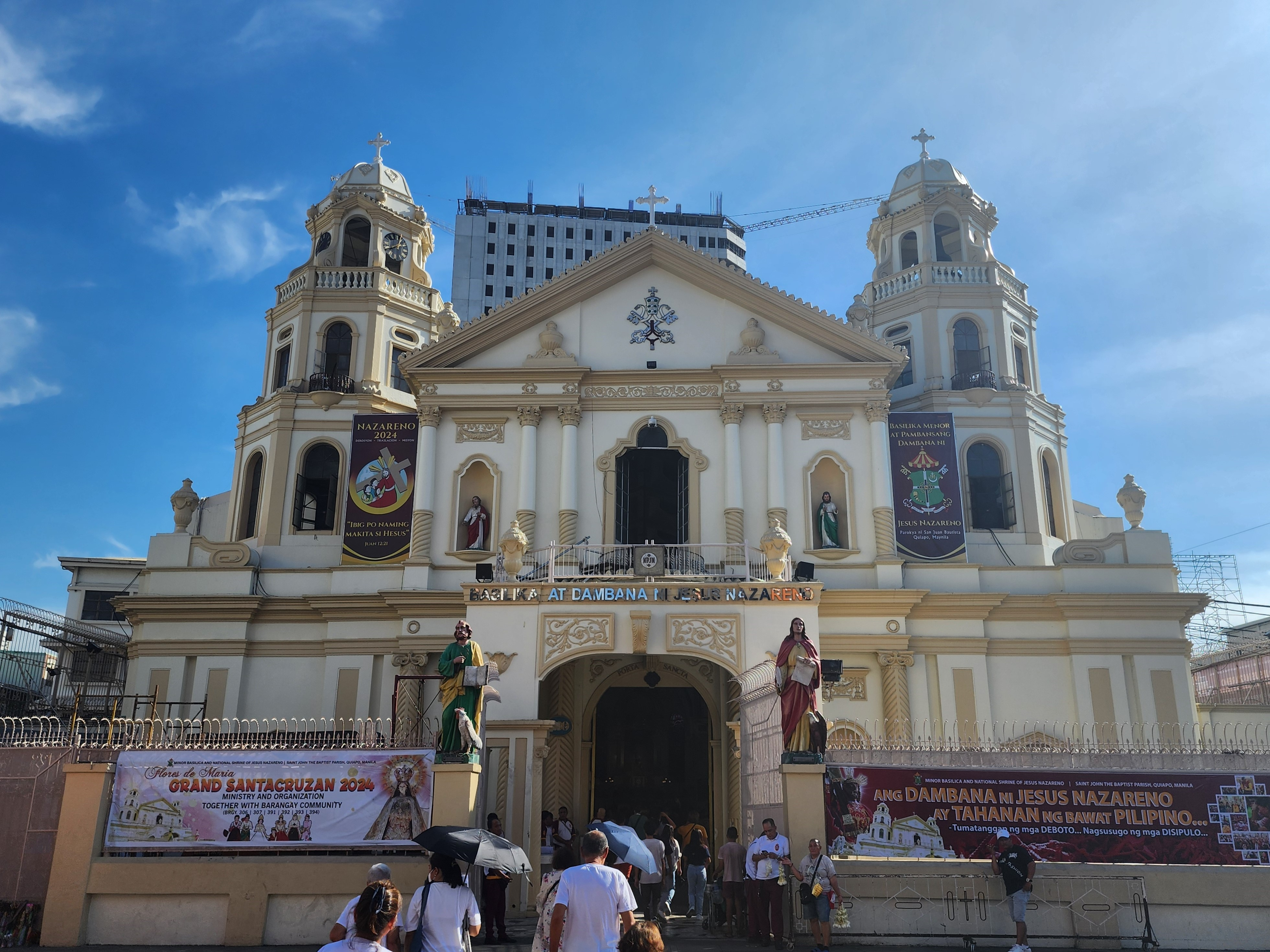
Quiapo Church is the home of the image of the Black Nazarene, which is the focus of widespread popular devotion in the country.

At the onset of the COVID-19 pandemic in 2020, mass gatherings were prohibited as part of community quarantines to contain the virus; this prompted the Church to broadcast most liturgical services and spiritual activities through the Internet, television, and radio, and the CBCP allowed bishops to dispense the faithful from Sunday obligation. Physical Holy Masses in churches gradually resumed by June at limited capacities, but were suspended multiple times in response to multiple surges of cases between August 2020 and January 2022. As quarantine restrictions eased, the CBCP, on October 14, 2022, released a circular encouraging the faithful to resume attending Sunday Masses; since then, several dioceses and archdioceses lifted its dispensations from physical attendance of Masses. Despite the setbacks brought by the pandemic, in 2021, the Church celebrated the quincentennial of the arrival of Christianity in the country; the celebrations commemorated the first Mass in the country and the re-enactment of the first Baptism in Cebu City, among others.

In 2024, the Philippine Church marked the declaration of Antipolo Cathedral as the country's first international shrine.

The Catholic church in the Philippines is unique for being by granted by the Roman Pontiff, the Cerulean Indult, the privilege to wear liturgical Cerulean or Celeste, in honor of the Immaculate Conception of Mary, a privilege, not shared by most other Latin Rite Catholics except for Catholics associated with the Spanish Empire, where it also doubly serves as the color of Native American Royalty even though the indult had initially fallen out of use due to wars of independence against Spain, the primary supporter of the Immaculate Conception, but was restored to all former Spanish-territories following the First Provincial Council of Manila as the Philippines earned, due to having reverted to or stayed loyal towards Catholicism amidst the divided stance of the church towards Philippine independence and the subsequent schisms produced by the Philippine Independent Church as well as other break away Protestant and Masonic influenced churches, after Spanish Colonialism was replaced by the American Imperialism.

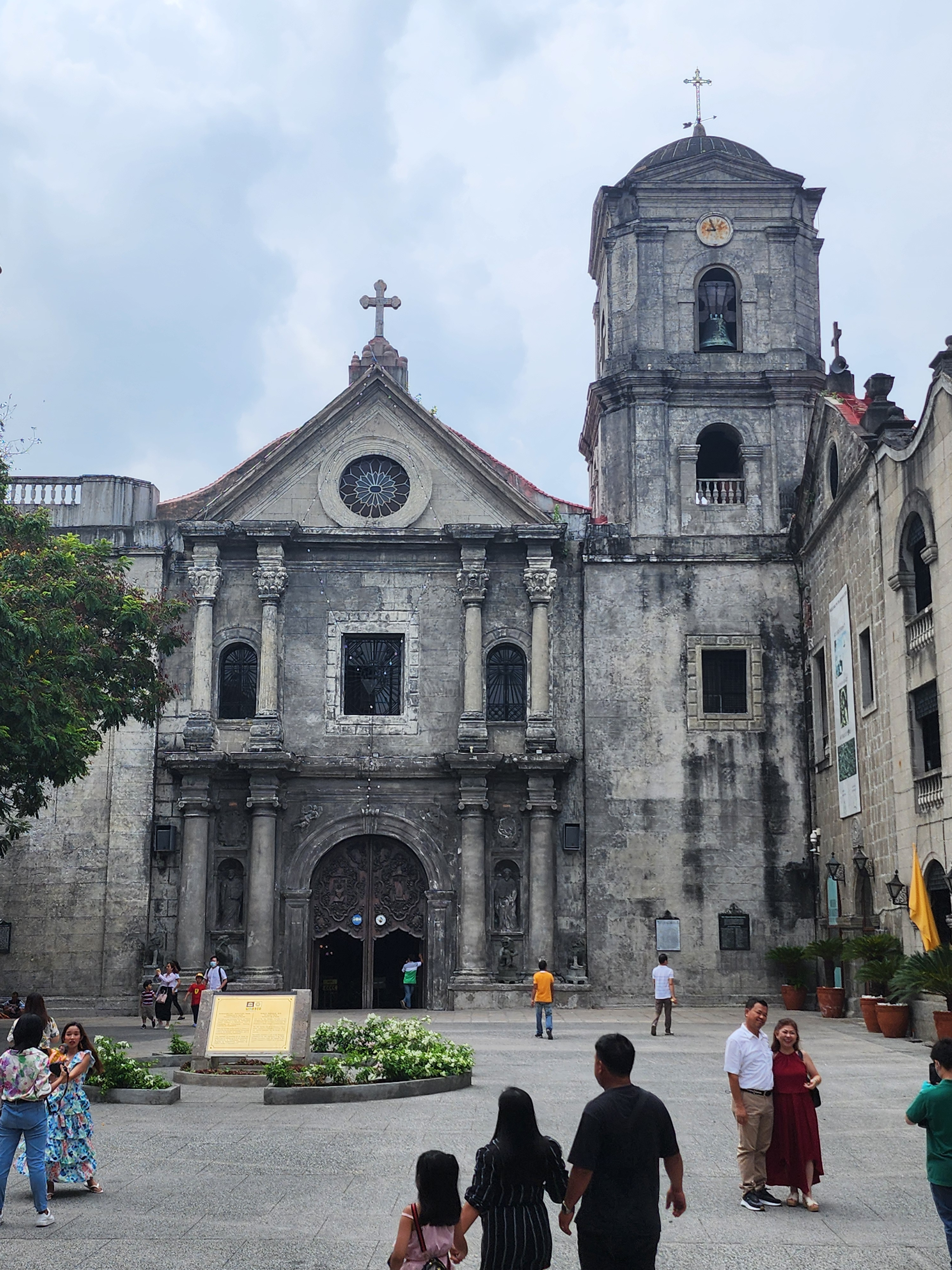
San Agustin Church (Manila)

== Demographics ==
These statistics are from Annuario Pontificio.

Philippine Catholic Statistics (Per Diocese)
Jurisdiction	%	Catholics	Population	As of	Ref
Archdiocese of Caceres	89.3%	1,973,650	1,761,509	2022	
Diocese of Daet	91%	636,202	699,478	2022	
Diocese of Legazpi	92.3%	1,389,658	1,505,170	2022	
Diocese of Libmanan	85%	511,196	601,407	2022	
Diocese of Masbate	88.9%	930,324	1,045,988	2022	
Diocese of Sorsogon	93%	779,900	838,600	2022	
Diocese of Virac	95%	265,162	279,118	2022	
Archdiocese of Cagayan de Oro	80.2%	1,443,993	1,799,450	2022	
Diocese of Butuan	79.1%	1,003,809	1,269,529	2022	
Diocese of Malaybalay	77.6%	1,363,026	1,756,058	2022	
Diocese of Surigao	82.1%	453,963	553,231	2022	
Diocese of Tandag	78.6%	600,144	763,780	2022	
Archdiocese of Capiz	90.1%	828,386	918,900	2022	
Diocese of Kalibo	74.7%	679,400	909,900	2022	
Diocese of Romblon	81.4%	472,660	580,485	2022	
Archdiocese of Cebu	86.8%	4,678,039	5,388,718	2022	
Diocese of Dumaguete	88.4%	1,412,394	1,598,455	2022	
Diocese of Maasin	83.5%	706,966	846,620	2022	
Diocese of Tagbilaran	94.3%	705,898	748,916	2022	
Diocese of Talibon	78.3%	604,548	771,795	2022	
Archdiocese of Cotabato	45.6%	1,108,300	2,431,960	2022	
Diocese of Kidapawan	58.5%	626,150	1,069,640	2022	
Diocese of Marbel	79.1%	1,691,050	2,137,340	2022	
Archdiocese of Davao	82.4%	1,506,873	1,829,041	2022	
Diocese of Digos	62.9%	856,039	1,362,021	2022	
Diocese of Mati	62.4%	369,160	591,289	2022	
Diocese of Tagum	73.1%	1,245,690	1,703,438	2022	
Archdiocese of Jaro	83.1%	3,082,540	3,708,350	2022	
Diocese of Bacolod	79%	1,309,520	1,657,620	2022	
Diocese of Kabankalan	80%	785,657	982,071	2022	
Diocese of San Carlos	85.7%	992,732	1,158,670	2022	
Diocese of San Jose de Antique	70.8%	499,000	704,400	2022	
Archdiocese of Lingayen-Dagupan	79%	1,232,511	1,560,927	2022	
Diocese of Alaminos	82.4%	660,545	802,114	2022	
Diocese of Cabanatuan	84.3%	1,036,081	1,228,762	2022	
Diocese of San Fernando de La Union	83%	690,339	831,734	2022	
Diocese of San Jose de Nueva Ecija	69%	636,422	922,351	2022	
Diocese of Urdaneta	81%	702,058	866,340	2022	
Archdiocese of Lipa	97.7%	3,337,746	3,414,937	2022	
Diocese of Boac	88%	257,064	292,019	2022	
Diocese of Gumaca	85%	909,321	1,070,269	2022	
Diocese of Lucena	89%	939,506	1,055,544	2022	
Territorial Prelature of Infanta	76.9%	373,000	485,240	2022	
Archdiocese of Manila	81%	2,694,960	3,327,180	2022	
Diocese of Antipolo	81.5%	3,144,550	3,856,230	2022	
Diocese of Cubao	78.8%	1,478,766	1,877,260	2022	
Diocese of Imus	79.9%	3,500,260	4,381,812	2022	
Diocese of Kalookan	80%	1,831,719	2,289,649	2022	
Diocese of Malolos	82.1%	3,757,226	4,577,850	2022	
Diocese of Novaliches	78%	2,500,327	3,205,547	2022	
Diocese of Parañaque	79.5%	1,504,036	1,891,869	2022	
Diocese of Pasig	87.1%	1,756,388	2,017,214	2022	
Diocese of San Pablo	87.8%	3,115,119	3,547,994	2022	
Archdiocese of Nueva Segovia	83%	642,183	773,834	2022	
Diocese of Baguio	72.6%	601,130	828,190	2022	
Diocese of Bangued	84.8%	227,532	268,438	2022	
Diocese of Laoag	59%	374,623	635,283	2022	
Archdiocese of Ozamis	58.2%	447,471	768,883	2022	
Diocese of Dipolog	69.4%	726,168	1,045,745	2022	
Diocese of Iligan	59.3%	716,993	1,209,061	2022	
Diocese of Pagadian	80.4%	1,098,000	1,366,200	2022	
Territorial Prelature of Marawi	3.7%	38,800	1,039,000	2016	
Archdiocese of Palo	95.9%	1,519,171	1,584,942	2022	
Diocese of Borongan	99%	472,168	477,168	2022	
Diocese of Calbayog	91.9%	745,592	811,630	2022	
Diocese of Catarman	93.9%	639,679	681,299	2022	
Diocese of Naval	86.3%	336,713	390,228	2022	
Archdiocese of San Fernando	85.9%	2,535,615	2,951,705	2022	
Diocese of Balanga	80%	690,890	863,610	2022	
Diocese of Iba	80%	739,793	924,741	2022	
Diocese of Tarlac	67.4%	1,116,210	1,656,200	2022	
Archdiocese of Tuguegarao	79.3%	1,669,800	2,105,970	2022	
Diocese of Bayombong	54.3%	406,000	748,153	2022	
Diocese of Ilagan	70%	1,187,935	1,697,050	2022	
Territorial Prelature of Batanes	94.8%	18,089	19,090	2022	
Archdiocese of Zamboanga	67.2%	707,170	1,052,763	2022	
Diocese of Ipil	75%	582,608	776,811	2022	
Territorial Prelature of Isabela	28.8%	131,560	456,400	2022	
Apostolic Vicariate of Bontoc-Lagawe	60.5%	221,750	366,766	2022	
Diocese of Calapan	92.7%	931,000	1,003,940	2022	
Apostolic Vicariate of Jolo	1.4%	19,240	1,374,259	2022	
Apostolic Vicariate of Puerto Princesa	64.1%	536,225	836,615	2022	
Apostolic Vicariate of San Jose in Mindoro	75.9%	403,900	532,445	2022	
Apostolic Vicariate of Tabuk	75%	375,000	499,800	2022	
Apostolic Vicariate of Taytay	83%	633,821	763,640	2022	

== Internal movements ==
=== Catholic Charismatic Renewal ===
A number of Catholic Charismatic Renewal movements emerged vis-a-vis the Born-again movement during the 70s. The charismatic movement offered In-the-Spirit seminars in the early days, which have now evolved and have different names; they focus on the charismatic gifts of the Holy Spirit. Some of the charismatic movements were the Ang Ligaya ng Panginoon, Assumption Prayer Group, Couples for Christ, the Brotherhood of Christian Businessmen and Professionals, El Shaddai, Elim Communities, Kerygma, the Light of Jesus Family, Shalom, and Soldiers of Christ.

=== Neocatechumenal Way ===
The Catholic Church's Neocatechumenal Way in the Philippines has been established for more than 40 years. Membership in the Philippines now exceeds 35,000 persons in more than 1,000 communities, with concentrations in Manila and Iloilo province. A neocatechumenal diocesan seminary, Redemptoris Mater, is located in Parañaque, while many families in mission are all over the islands. The Way has been mostly concentrated on evangelization initiatives under the authority of the local bishops.

== Organization ==
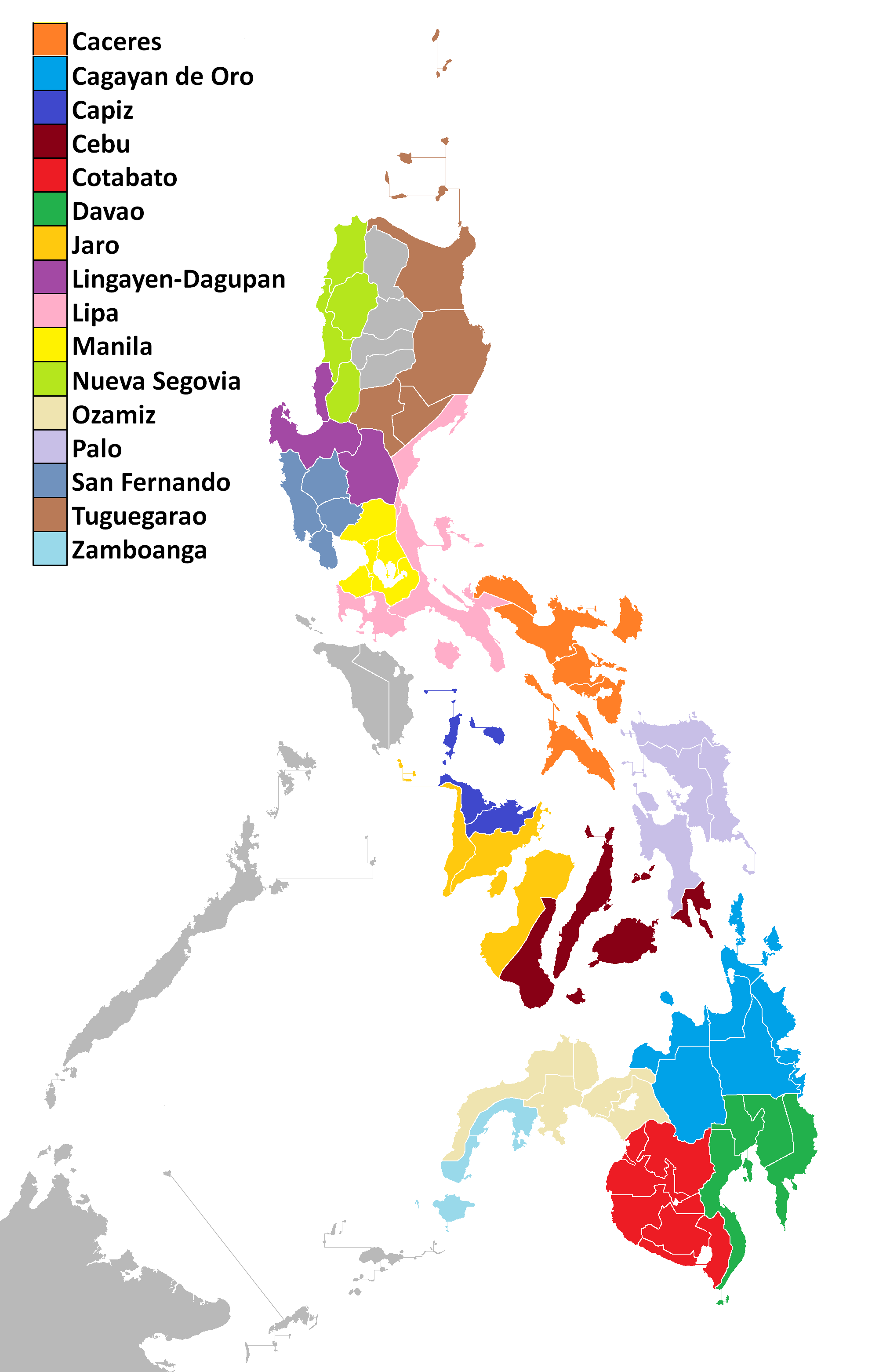
Catholic archdioceses in the Philippines

The Catholic Church in the Philippines is organized into 72 dioceses in 16 Ecclesiastical Provinces, as well as 7 Apostolic Vicariates and a Military Ordinariate.

=== Extraordinary ministers of Holy Communion ===
Due to large number of attendees, virtually all Masses in the Philippines employ the use of extraordinary ministers of Holy Communion; commissioning of ministers and renewal of their vows is a regular occurrence. In early 2023, claims regarding Freemasons distributing Holy Communion in some parishes prompted the Catholic Bishops' Conference of the Philippines to restate its stance on "the unacceptability of Masonry, given its serious errors".

== Society ==
=== Education ===
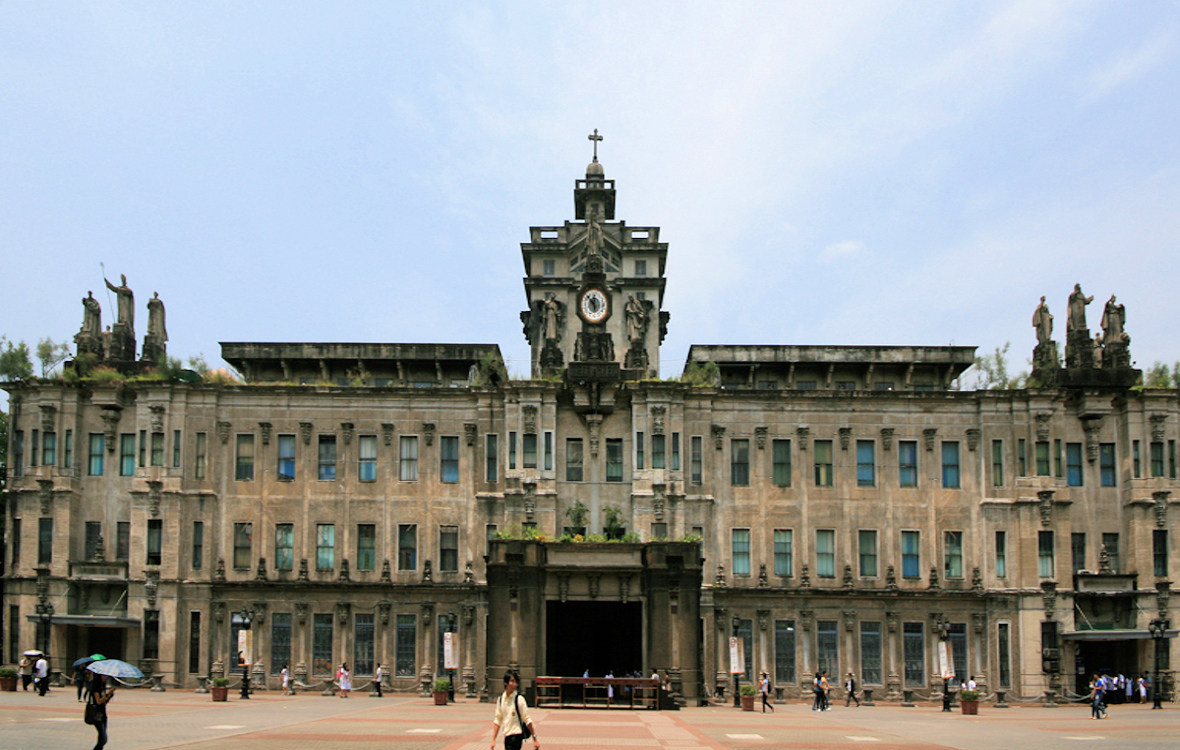
University of Santo Tomas

The Catholic Church is involved in education at all levels. It has founded and continues to sponsor hundreds of secondary and primary schools as well as a number of colleges and internationally known universities. The earliest universities in the Philippines were the University of San Carlos and the University of Santo Tomas, founded during the Spanish colonial period. The Jesuit Ateneo de Manila University, La Salle Brothers De La Salle University, and the Dominican University of Santo Tomas are listed in the "World's Best Colleges and Universities" in the Times Higher Education-QS World University Rankings.

Other Catholic educational institutions in the country include the Notre Dame institution system in Mindanao, the Rogationist College in Silang, Cavite, and the Divine Word and Saint Louis school systems in Luzon.

More than 1,500 Catholic schools throughout the Philippines are members of the Catholic Educational Association of the Philippines (CEAP), the national association of Catholic schools in the country founded in 1941.

=== Politics ===
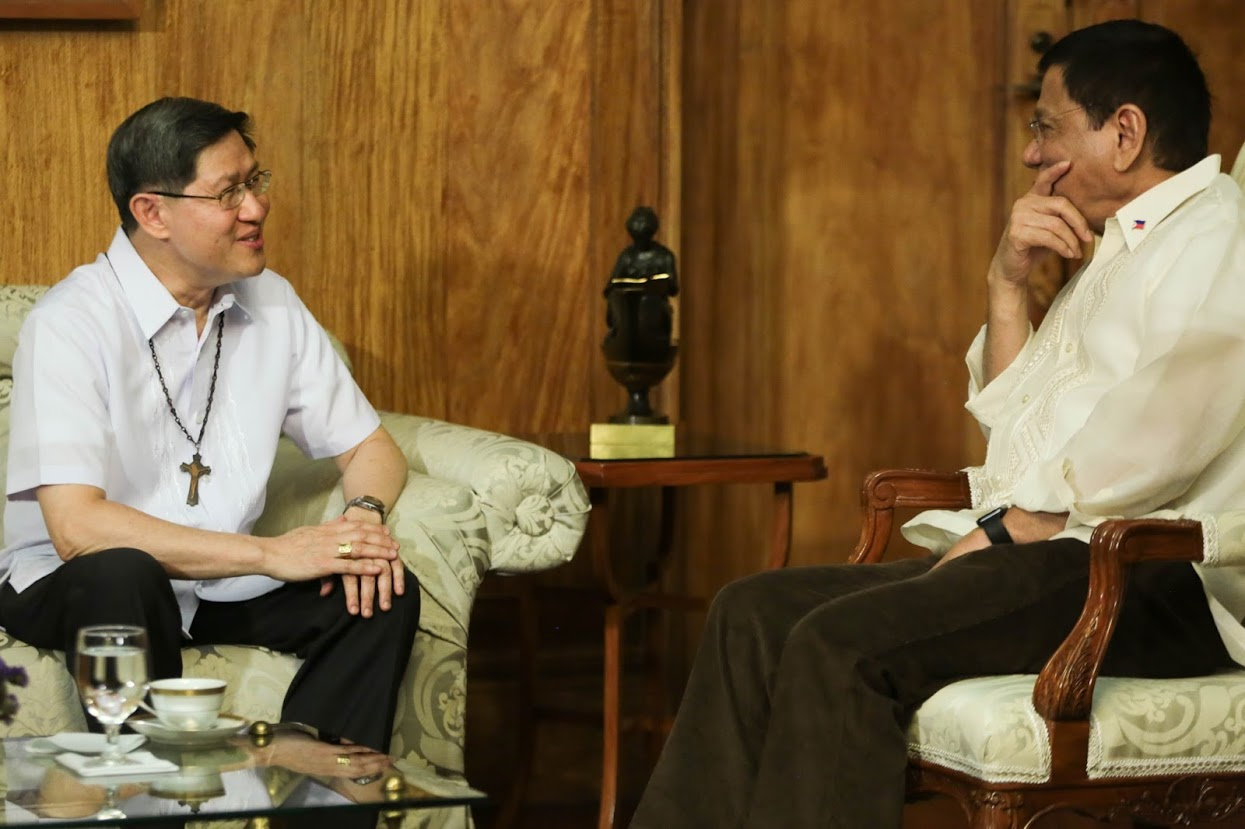
President Duterte meets with Cardinal Tagle at the Malacañan Palace, July 19, 2016

The Catholic Church wields great influence on Philippine society and politics, notably reaching its political peak in 1986. Then-Archbishops of Cebu and Manila—Cardinals Ricardo Vidal and Jaime Sin, respectively—were influential during the People Power Revolution of 1986 against dictator Ferdinand E. Marcos. Vidal, who was president of the Catholic Bishops' Conference of the Philippines (CBCP) at that time, led the rest of the Philippine bishops and made a joint declaration against Marcos and the results of the snap election, while Sin appealed to the public via radio to march along Epifanio delos Santos Avenue in support of rebel forces. Some seven million people responded in the non-violent revolution which lasted from February 22–25, effectively driving Marcos out of power and into exile in Hawaii.

In 1989, President Corazon Aquino asked Vidal to convince General Jose Comendador, who was sympathetic to the rebel forces fighting her government, to peacefully surrender. Vidal's efforts averted what could have been a bloody coup.

In October 2000, Sin expressed his dismay over the allegations of corruption against President Joseph Estrada. His call sparked the second EDSA Revolution, dubbed as "EDSA Dos". Vidal personally asked Estrada to step down, to which he agreed at around 12:20 p.m. of January 20, 2001, after five continuous days of protest at the EDSA Shrine, and various parts of the Philippines and the world. Estrada's Vice-President, Gloria Macapagal-Arroyo, succeeded him and was sworn in on the terrace of the shrine in front of Sin. However, in 2008, more than halfway into Arroyo's presidency, the Catholic Church apologized, and the CBCP President at the time and the Archbishop of Jaro, Angel Lagdameo, called EDSA II a mistake.

On the death of Pope John Paul II in 2005, President Gloria Macapagal Arroyo declared three days of national mourning and was one of many dignitaries at his funeral in Vatican City. Political turmoil in the Philippines widened the rift between the State and the Church. Arroyo's press secretary Ignacio Bunye called the bishops and priests who attended an anti-Arroyo protest as hypocrites and "people who hide their true plans".

The Catholic Church in the Philippines strongly opposed the Responsible Parenthood and Reproductive Health Act of 2012, commonly known as the RH Bill. The country's populace – 80% of which self-identify as Catholic – was deeply divided in its opinions over the issue. Members of the CBCP vehemently denounced and repeatedly attempted to block President Benigno Aquino III's plan to push for the passage of the reproductive health bill. The bill, which was popular among the public, was signed into law by Aquino, and was seen as a point of waning moral and political influence of the Catholic Church in the country.

During the Duterte administration, the Catholic Church in the Philippines was vocally critical of extrajudicial killings taking place during the war on drugs, in what the church sees as the administration's approval of the bloodshed. Efforts by the church to rally public support against the administration's war on drugs were less effective due to Duterte's popularity and high trust rating. Some churches reportedly offered sanctuary to those who fear death due to the drug war violence.

During the 2022 presidential elections campaign, the church supported and endorsed the candidacy of vice president Leni Robredo in an effort to prevent Bongbong Marcos, son of dictator Ferdinand Marcos, from winning the election. Robredo, who won in 18 of the 86 dioceses in the country, lost the presidential race in a landslide.

=== Missionary activities ===
The Philippines has been active in sending Catholic missionaries around the world and has been a training centre for foreign priests and nuns.

To spread the Christian religion and the teachings of Jesus Christ, missionaries enter local communities. Depending on where a missionary or group of missionaries are travelling, their work will vary (international or local communities).

=== Marian devotion ===
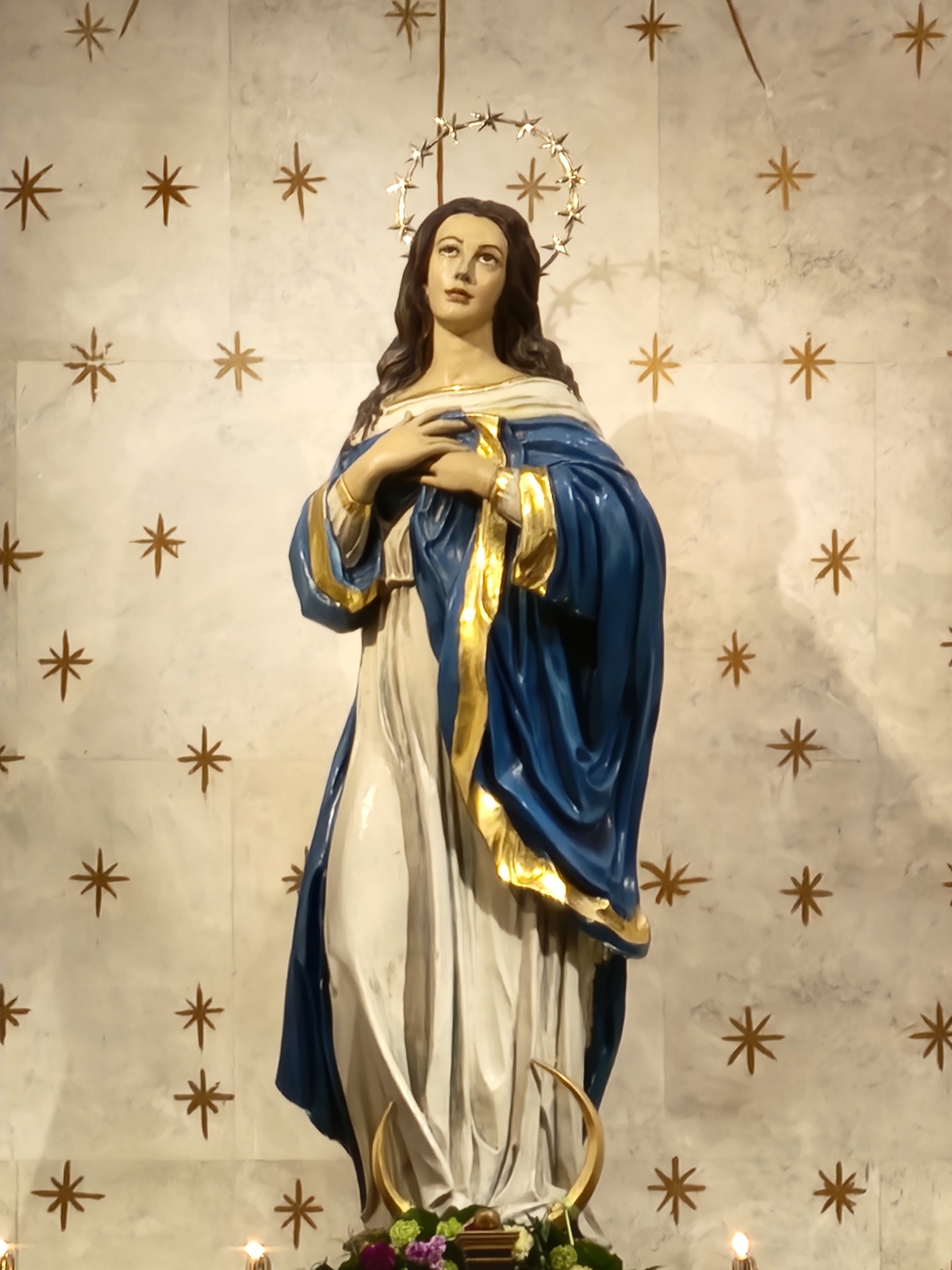
The Blessed Virgin Mary under the title of the Immaculate Concepcion, is officially the principal patroness of the Philippines

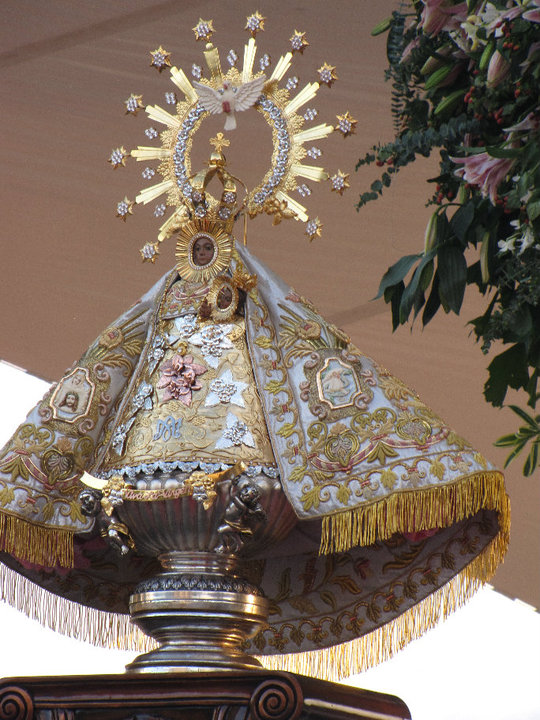
Our Lady of Peñafrancia has almost five to nine million devotees attending its annual feast in Naga City.

The Philippines has shown a strong devotion to Mary, evidenced by her patronage of various towns and locales nationwide. Particularly, there are pilgrimage sites dedicated to a specific apparition or title of Mary. With Spanish regalia, indigenous miracle stories, and Asian facial features, Filipino Catholics have created hybridized, localized images, the popular devotions to which have been recognized by various Popes.

Filipino Marian images with an established devotion have generally received a Canonical Coronation, with the icon's principal shrine being customarily elevated to the status of minor basilica. Below are some pilgrimage sites and the year they received a canonical blessing:

- Our Lady of the Abandoned (Nuestra Señora de los Desamparados) Marikina – 2005
- Our Lady of La Leche (Nuestra Señora de la Leche y Buen Parto) Diocese of Imus, Silang, Cavite
- Our Lady of Aranzazu (Nuestra Señora de Aranzazu) San Mateo, Rizal – 2017
- Our Lady of Bigláng Awà (Nuestra Señora del Pronto Socorro) Boac, Marinduque – 1978
- Our Lady of Caysasay (Nuestra Señora de Caysásay) Taal, Batangas – 1954
- Our Lady of Charity (Nuestra Señora de Caridad) – Basilica Minore of Our Lady of Charity
  - Bantay, Ilocos Sur – 1956
  - Agoo, La Union – 1971
- Our Lady of the Assumption (Nuestra Señora dela Asuncion) Santa Maria Church, Santa Maria, Ilocos Sur
- Our Lady of Consolation (Nuestra Señora de Consolación y Correa) San Agustin Church, Intramuros, City of Manila
- Our Lady, the Divine Shepherdess (La Virgen Divina Pastora) – Gapan Church, Gapan, Nueva Ecija – 1964
- Our Lady of Namacpacan (Nuestra Señora de Namacpacan) Luna, La Union – 1959
- Our Lady of Buen Suceso (Parañaque) (Nuestra Señora del Buen Suceso de Parañaque) Parañaque – 2005
- Our Lady of Guadalupe (Nuestra Señora de Guadalupe) Pagsanjan, Laguna
- Our Lady of Guadalupe of Cebu (Nuestra Señora de Guadalupe de Cebú) Cebu City – 2006
- Our Lady of Guidance (Nuestra Señora de Guia) Ermita, City of Manila – 1955
- Our Lady of the Immaculate Conception of Pasig (Nuestra Señora de la Inmaculada Concepción de Pásig) Pasig – 2008
- Our Lady of the Immaculate Conception (Nuestra Señora de La Inmaculada Concepción de Malabón) Malabon – 1986
- Our Lady of the Immaculate Conception (Virgen Inmaculada Concepción de Malolos) Malolos, Bulacan – 2012
- Our Lady of La Naval (Nuestra Señora del Santísimo Rosario de la Naval de Manila) Quezon City – 1907
- Our Lady of Lourdes (Nuestra Señora de Lourdes) Quezon City – 1951
- Our Lady of Manaoag (Nuestra Señora del Santísimo Rosario de Manáoag) Manaoag, Pangasinan – 1926
- Our Lady of Orani (Nuestra Señora del Santo Rosario de Orani) – Orani, Bataan
- Our Lady of Peace and Good Voyage (Nuestra Señora de la Paz y Buen Viaje) Antipolo, Rizal – 1926
- Our Lady of Peñafráncia of Naga (Nuestra Señora de Peñafráncia de Naga) Naga City, Camarines Sur – 1924
- Our Lady of Peñafráncia of Manila (Nuestra Señora del Rosario de Río Pásig) Paco, City of Manila – 1985
- Our Lady of Piat (Nuestra Señora de Píat) Piat, Cagayan – 1954
- Our Lady of the Pillar (Nuestra Señora la Virgen del Pilar) Zamboanga City – 1960
- Our Lady of the Pillar of Imus (Nuestra Señora del Pilar de Imus) Imus, Cavite – 2012
- Our Lady of the Pillar of Manila (Nuestra Señora del Pilar de Manila) Santa Cruz, Manila – 2017
- Our Lady of the Rule (Nuestra Señora de la Regla) Opon, Cebu – 1954
- Our Lady of Solitude of Vaga Gate (Nuestra Señora de la Soledad de Porta Vaga) Cavite City
- Our Lady of Sorrows of Turúmba (Nuestra Señora de los Dolores de Turúmba) Pakil, Laguna
- Our Lady of the Candles (Nuestra Señora de la Candelaria) Jaro, Iloilo City
- Our Mother of Perpetual Help (Nuestra Señora del Perpetuo Socorro) Baclaran, Parañaque
- Our Lady of Salvation (Nuestra Señora de la Salvación) Joroan, Tiwi, Albay
- Our Lady of Mercy (Nuestra Señora de la Merced) Novaliches, Quezon City – 2021, Matatalaib, Tarlac City – 2023
- Our Lady of Soterraña de Nieva, currently owned by former First Lady Imelda Marcos
- Virgen de los Remedios de Pampanga (Indu Ning Capaldanan) Archdiocese of San Fernando, Pampanga
- Our Lady of Hope of Palo (Nuestra Señora de la Esperanza) Palo, Leyte
- Our Lady of the Rose of Makati (Nuestra Señora de la Rosa de Macati) Población, Makati
- Virgen sang Barangay (Virgin of the Village) Bacolod City – 2025

=== Religious observances ===
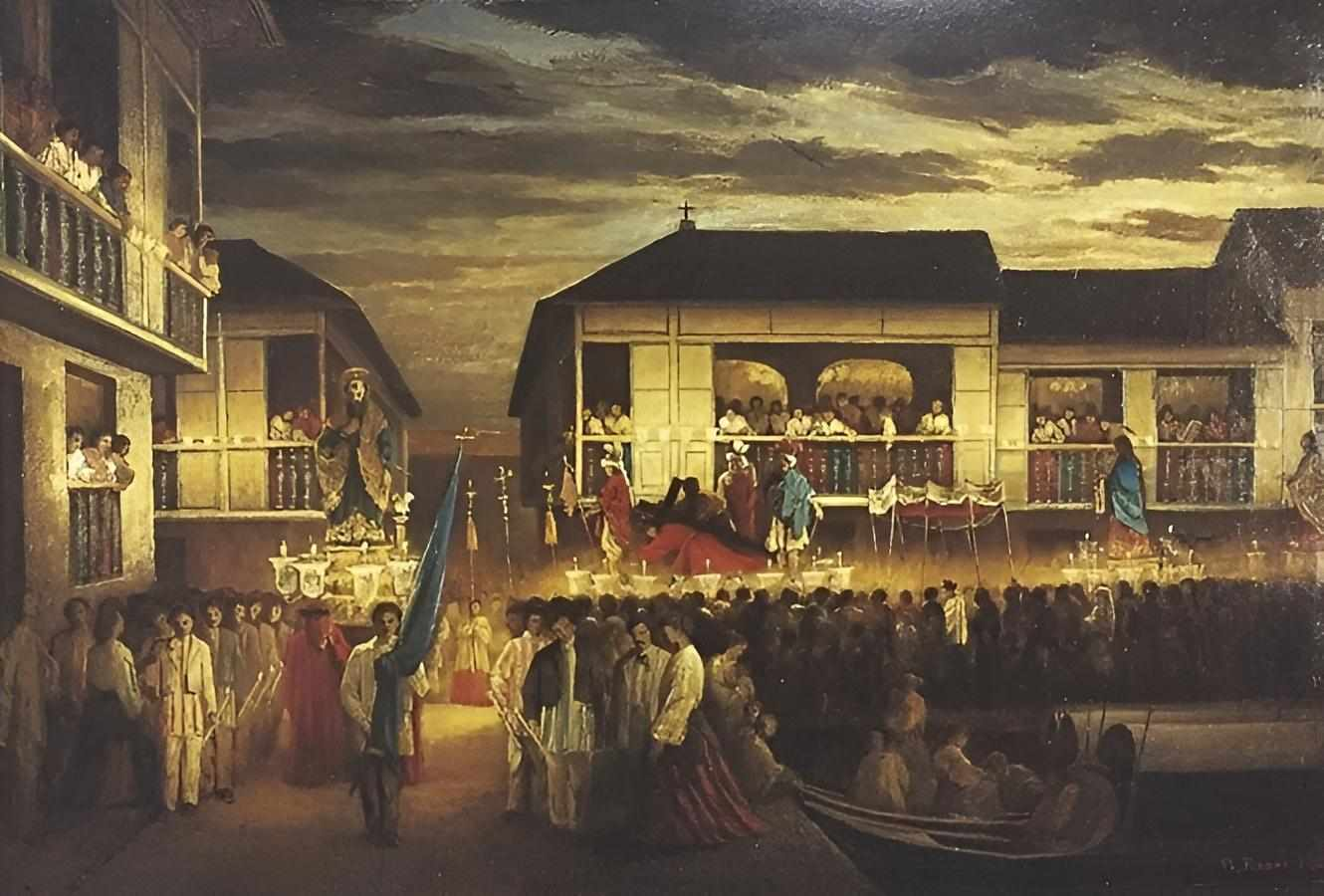
Procession in Manila. With the windows of the traditional Bahay na bato houses fully opened for its occupants to participate in the event. by Felipe Roxas y Arroyo circa 1800's.

Catholic holy days, such as Christmas and Good Friday, are observed as national holidays, with local saints' days being observed as holidays in different towns and cities. The Hispanic-influenced custom of holding fiestas in honor of patron saints have become an integral part of Filipino culture, as it allows for communal celebration while serving as a celebration of the town's existence. A nationwide fiesta occurs on the third Sunday in January, on the country-specific Feast of the Santo Niño de Cebú. Major festivals include Sinulog in Cebu City, Ati-Atihan in Kalibo, Aklan, and Dinagyang in Iloilo City.

Although the Catholic Church observes ten holy days of obligation, the Philippines only observes three. These are:

- December 8: Solemnity of the Immaculate Conception of the Blessed Virgin Mary
- December 25: Christmas (The Nativity of the Lord)
- January 1: Solemnity of Mary, the Holy Mother of God

=== Filipino diaspora ===
Overseas Filipinos have spread Filipino culture worldwide, bringing Filipino Catholicism with them. Filipinos have established two shrines in the Chicago Metropolitan Area: one at St. Wenceslaus Church dedicated to Santo Niño de Cebú and another at St. Hedwig's with its statue to Our Lady of Manaoag. The Filipino community in the Archdiocese of New York has the San Lorenzo Ruiz Chapel (New York City) for its apostolate.

== Papal visits ==
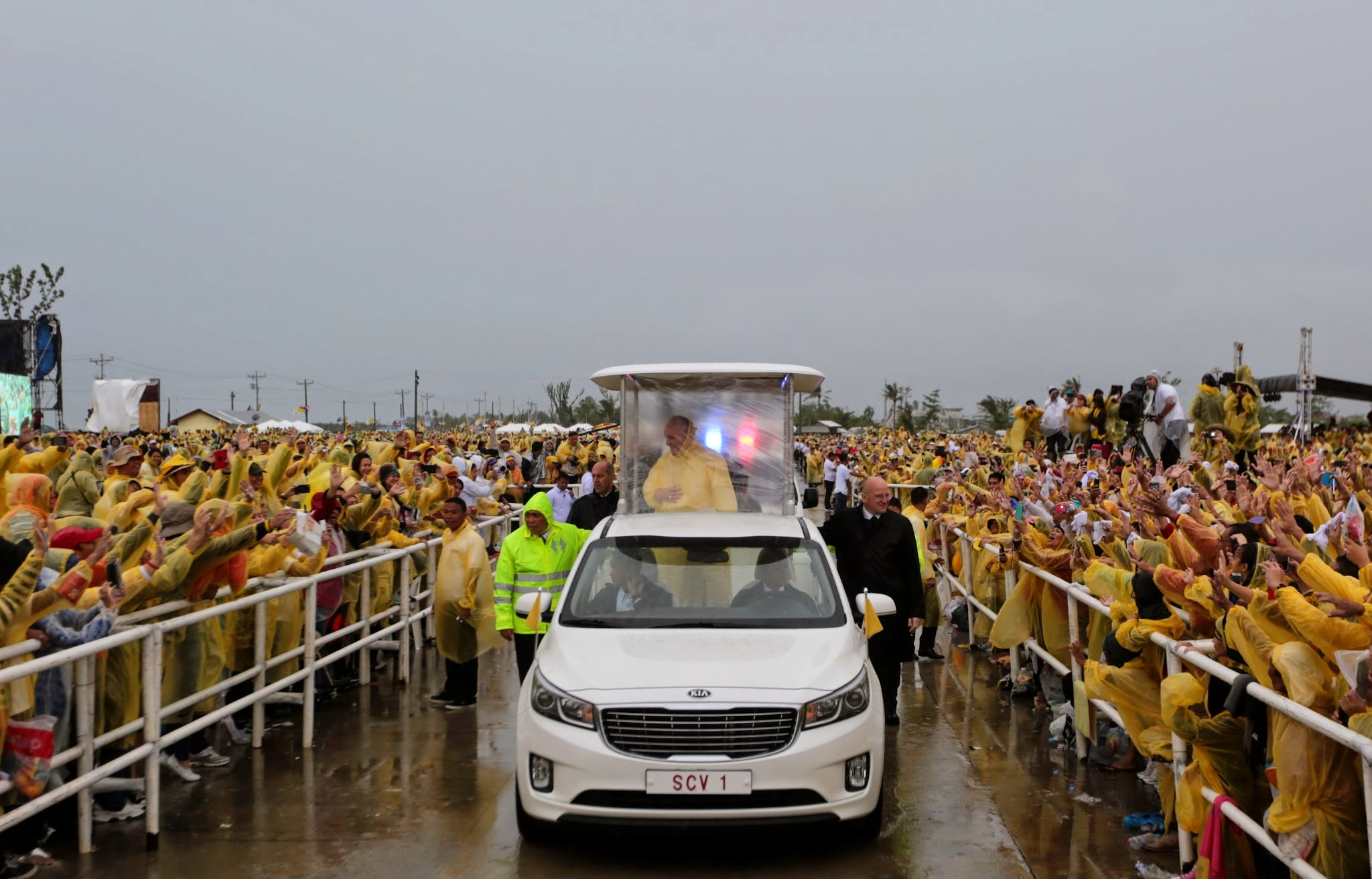
Pope Francis in Tacloban in January 2015

- Pope Paul VI (1970) was the target of an assassination attempt at Manila International Airport in the Philippines in 1970. The assailant, a Bolivian surrealist painter named Benjamín Mendoza y Amor Flores, lunged toward Pope Paul with a kris, but was subdued.
- Pope John Paul II (1981 and 1995) returned for World Youth Day 1995 which was reported to have an attendance of around five million Filipino and foreign people in Rizal Park.
- Pope Francis (2015) visited the country on January 15–19, 2015, and was invited by then-Manila Archbishop, Cardinal Luis Antonio Tagle to return for the International Eucharistic Congress in Cebu in 2016. At the Mass at Manila's Quirino Grandstand inside Rizal Park on Sunday, January 18, 2015, the attendance was pegged at about six to seven million worshippers, making the event the highest number ever recorded in papal history according to Fr. Federico Lombardi, director of the Vatican Press Office.

== See also ==
- Christmas in the Philippines
- Holy Week in the Philippines
- Spanish influence on Filipino culture
- Freedom of religion in the Philippines
- List of Filipino Saints, Blesseds, and Servants of God
- List of Catholic churches in the Philippines
- Palacio Arzobispal
- Baroque Churches of the Philippines
- List of Baroque churches in the Philippines
- List of Catholic churches in the Philippines
- Historical list of the Catholic bishops of the Philippines
