= Timeline of the Magellan expedition =

The route of the Victoria, which completed the world's first recorded circumnavigation over about 3 years.

The Magellan expedition (10 August or 20 September 1519 – 6 September 1522) was the first voyage around the world in human history. It was a Spanish expedition that sailed from Seville in 1519 under the initial command of Ferdinand Magellan, a Portuguese sailor, and completed in 1522 by Spanish Basque navigator Juan Sebastián Elcano.

The initial goal of the voyage was to secure time to explore the possibility of a southwestern passage around South America to China and the Spice Islands (now part of Indonesia). After crossing the Atlantic, wintering in Patagonia, and suppressing a mutiny, the expedition found and transited the Straits of Magellan in 1520. After crossing the Pacific Ocean to the Philippines, Magellan was killed during a raid on the Mactan chief Lapulapu in 1521. The ship Victoria under Juan Sebastian Elcano—who began the expedition as a boatswain— took command of the expedition and sailed into the open Indian Ocean, avoided landing in South Africa despite the resulting starvation, and bluffed his way into resupply at the Cape Verde Islands before completing the first circumnavigation on 6 September 1522. Of the initial 270 crew members, only 18 sailors completed the entire journey.

== Timeline ==
=== 1494 ===
- June 7: The Treaty of Tordesillas amends a series of earlier papal bulls to divide the newly discovered territories of the world between the Spanish and Portuguese Empires 370 leagues west of the Cape Verde Islands. Importantly, it provides for a Portuguese monopoly on trade around Africa but leaves open the possibility of Spanish exploration further west to the antimeridian of the division.

=== 1514 ===
- Magellan was intent on finding a route to the Spice Islands. Accused of unlawfully trading with the Moors, the Portuguese king denied Magellan permission to embark on Portuguese adventures

=== 1518 ===
- Magellan moves to Seville, the seat of the Casa de Contratación. He secures an audience with the new Habsburg king Charles I (later emperor Charles V of the Holy Roman Empire) and his mother and co-monarch Joanna at Aranjuez.
- March 22: Charles issues the Titulo de Capitanes... approving the expedition under both Magellan and Ruy Faleiro, giving Magellan power of 'rope and knife' over the men and authority over newly discovered lands, and establishing a division of the profits upon its success. It is not expected at the time that the expedition would continue west into Portuguese territory to complete a circumnavigation. Magellan becomes a Spanish subject as part of the arrangement.

=== 1519 ===
- April 19: Charles issues the expedition's letters patent, repeating his previous grants, naming Magellan and Faleiro captains general, and directing them to seek spices in the Moluccas.
- August 10: Departure from Seville down the Guadalquivir River to Sanlúcar de Barrameda, where the ships underwent further repairs, preparation, and provisioning.
- September 20: Departure from Sanlúcar de Barrameda.
- September 26 – October 3: Stopping in the Canary Islands to take in provisions.
- November 29: Fleet reaches the vicinity of Cape St. Augustine.
- December 13: Entering the bay of Rio de Janeiro.
- December 27: Departure from Rio de Janeiro.

=== 1520 ===
- January 10: Cape Santa María. Severe storm then forces Magellan to reverse course and head north, toward Paranaguá Bay.
- January 12: Rio de la Plata
- February 3: The fleet resumes its southward course but the San Antonio found to be leaking badly and halts for repairs.
- February 5: Cape Corrientes
- February 24: San Matías Gulf
- February 27: Entering Bahía de los Patos.
- March 31: Beginning of the overwintering stay at Puerto San Julián.
- April 1 and 2: Attempted mutiny of the Victoria, Concepcion, and San Antonio, deftly handled by Magellan. Louis de Mendoza killed, followed by the execution of De Quesada and marooning of De Cartagena. Alvaro de Mesquita becomes the captain of the San Antonio and Duarte Barbosa of the Victoria.
- End of April: Santiago is sent on a mission to find the passage. The ship is caught in a storm and wrecked. Survivors return to Puerto San Julián. João Serrão becomes captain of the Concepcion.
- July: Encounters with the “Patagonian giants” (likely the Tehuelche people).
- August 23 or 24: Fleet departs Puerto San Julián for Río Santa Cruz.
- October 18: Fleet leaves Santa Cruz.
- October 21: Arriving at the Cape of the Eleven Thousand Virgins, entry to what would be known as Strait of Magellan.
- End of October: San Antonio, charged to explore Magdalen Sound, fails to return to the fleet, instead sails back to Spain under Estêvão Gomes who imprisoned captain de Mesquita. The ship arrives in Spain on May 21, 1521.
- November 28: The fleet leaves the strait and enters the Pacific Ocean.
  - When out in the Pacific, some of the crew get scurvy.

=== 1521 ===
- January 24 or 25–28: Landfall on an uninhabited island, which Magellan names St Paul's (probably Puka-Puka). They stay for a few days before continuing on.
- March 6: Arrival at Guam and encounters with the Chamorro people.
- March 16: Sighting of Zamal (Samar), one of the Philippine Islands. They landed on the uninhabited island of Humunu (Homonhon) where they encountered fishermen from the nearby island of Zuluan (Suluan). They traded supplies with the locals and learned the local culture and the names of nearby islands while their sick crew members recuperated.
- March 28: They anchored off the island of Mazaua (Limasawa) where they met two rulers on a hunting expedition on the island, Rajah Kulambo and Rajah Siawi, of the Rajahnate of Butuan and Calagan (Surigao) respectively. Magellan and his crew spent a few days as the guests of the rulers.
- March 31 (Easter Sunday): First Mass in the Philippines held in Limasawa.
- April 3: The fleet sets off for Cebu, guided by the balangay warships of Rajah Kulambo.
- April 7: Arrival at Zubu (Rajahnate of Cebu). Magellan starts converting natives to Christianity, including the raja Humabon.
- April 27: Death of Magellan in the Battle of Mactan. Serrão and Barbosa are voted co-commanders and refuse to honor Magellan's will, manumitting his Malay slave Enrique. Afonso de Góis becomes captain of the Victoria.
- May 1: At a banquet held by Humabon, Barbosa and 27 sailors including De Góis are massacred. Enrique escapes. Serrão escapes but is captured and killed. The fleet escapes to Bohol.
- May 2: Without enough men to repair and man the three ships, the worm-infested Concepcion is burned. João Lopez Carvalho selected as captain general and commander of the Trinidad. Gonzalo Gómez de Espinosa becomes captain of the Victoria. The ships subsequently sail to Mindanao, Mapun, Palawan, and Brunei in search of supplies, abandoning sailors along the way.
- September 21: Carvalho is replaced by Espinosa as captain general. Juan Sebastian Elcano becomes captain of Victoria.
- November 8: The fleet finally arrives at Tidore in the Moluccas, purchasing tons of cloves.
- December 21: Trinidad remains in Tidore for repairs while Victoria leaves west, sailing through the Sunda Strait and across the Indian Ocean towards the Cape of Good Hope.

=== 1522 ===
- January 25: Victoria reaches Timor and starts to cross the Indian Ocean.
- April 6: Trinidad under the command of Espinosa leaves the Moluccas heading home sailing east. After five weeks, Espinosa decides to return to the Moluccas where he and his ship are captured by a Portuguese fleet under Antonio de Brito. However, the ship is wrecked during a storm.
- May 22: Victoria passes the Cape of Good Hope and enters the Atlantic Ocean.
- July 9: Victoria reaches Santiago, Cape Verde.
- September 6: Victoria returns to Sanlúcar de Barrameda under the command of Elcano, two weeks shy of three years after setting sail.
- September 8: Victoria arrives at Seville.
- September 9: Elcano and the other first 17 European circumnavigators—each holding a candle—walk barefoot from the Victoria to the Minim convent of Our Lady of Victory of Triana in fulfillment of vows taken during their extremity.

=== 1523 ===
- Settlement of King Carlos I of Spain and Juana I with Ferdinand Magellan and Rui Faleiro signed at Valladolid, Spain.
