= Rajah Colambu =

Colambu
- Rajah of Mazaua

Rajah Colambu (or Kolambo) was a pre-colonial Filipino ruler of Limasawa (then called Mazaua) and/or Butuan who famously the first local ruler in the Archipelago to establish ties with the Spanish. Rajah Colambu is known for participating in the first Catholic Mass in the Philippines in March 31, 1521, and formed a blood compact with the Ferdinand Magellan, symbolizing early alliances and trade.

Historical manuscripts about the Rajah is limited, mostly dependent on the records from Antonio Pigafetta (Relazione del primo viaggio intorno al mondo) and Francisco Albo (Diario de a bordo). From the limited records, it is understood that he is the brother of Rajah Siawi of the Kingdom of Butuan and was a cousin to Rajah Humabon of Cebu.
