= Butuan (historical polity) =

Precolonial Philippine polity

Butuan But'ban
- Before 1001–1597
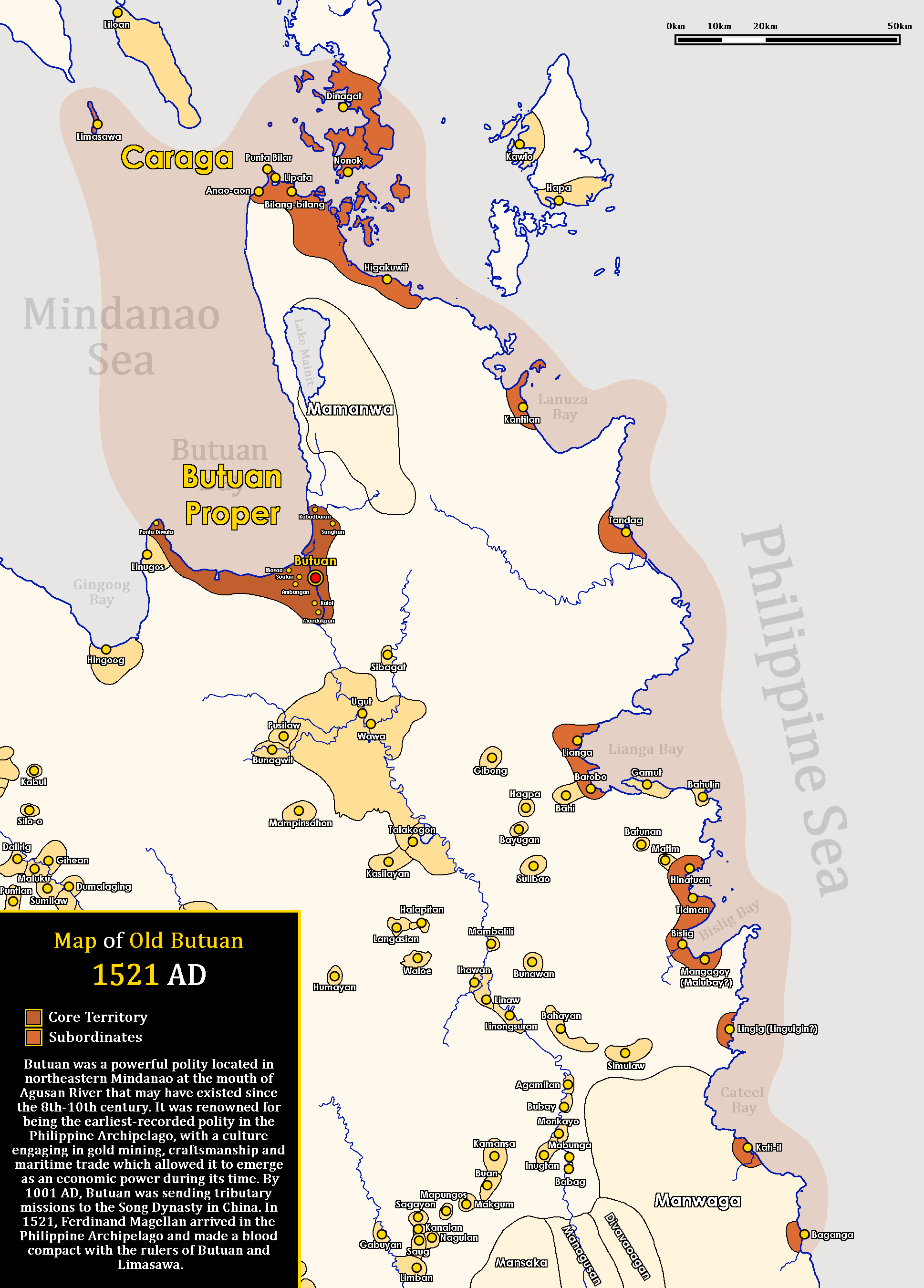
- Map of Butuan in 1521, with Butuan proper (colored dark brown), its controlled territories (brown), and territories under its influence (light brown).
- Capital: Butuan
- Common languages: Butuanon, Old Malay, other Visayan languages
- Religion: Hinduism (official), Buddhism and animism; Islam (little influence)
- Government: Monarchy
- History
  - Established: Before 1001
  - First historical reference by Song dynasty records: 1001
  - Blood compact with Ferdinand Magellan: 31 March 1521
  - Christianization of the polity under Silongan: 1567
  - Area conquered by Spain: 8 September 1597
- Currency: Piloncitos, barter rings
Succeeded by
Captaincy General of the Philippines; Cebu
- Today part of: Philippines

Butuan, sometimes referred to as the Rajahnate of Butuan (Filipino: Kaharian ng Butuan; Butuanon: Gingharian hong Butuan; Cebuano: Gingharian sa Butuan; Chinese: 蒲端國; pinyin: Púduānguó), was a precolonial Bisaya Hindu polity (lungsod) centered around northeastern Mindanao island in present-day Butuan, Philippines. It was known for its gold mining, gold jewelry and other wares, and its extensive trade network across Maritime Southeast Asia and elsewhere. Over its long history the lungsod had direct trading relationships with the ancient civilizations of China, Champa, Đại Việt, Pon-i (Brunei), Srivijaya, Majapahit, Kambuja, and even Persia, as well as areas now comprised in Thailand.

The balangay (large outrigger boats) that have been found along the east and west banks of the Libertad River (the old Agusan River) have revealed much about Butuan's history. As a result, Butuan is considered to have been a major trading port in the Caraga region during the precolonial era.

== Etymology ==
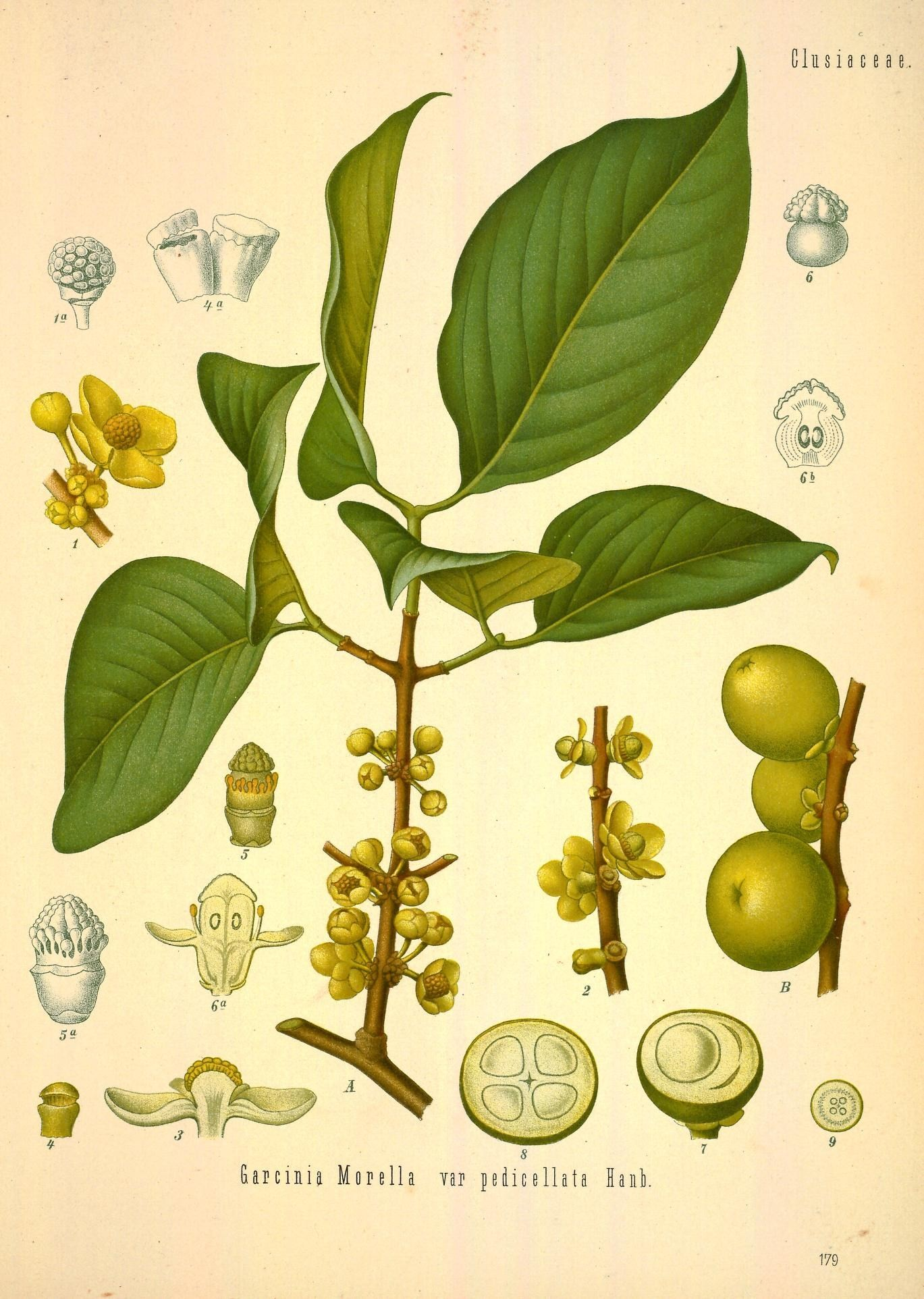
An illustration of the Garcinia morella, locally called batuan, which might have been where the name Butuan came from.

The name Butuan is believed to have existed long before the Spanish conquistadores arrived in the Philippine archipelago. One possible indication of this is a rhinoceros ivory seal with a design carved in ancient Javanese or early Kawi script (used around the 10th century CE), which, according to a Dutch scholar, was deciphered as But-wan. Another account suggests the name derives from the word batuan, a mangosteen-related fruit common in Mindanao. Another alternative is that the name derives from Datu Bantuan, possibly a former datu of the region.

Dr. Henry Otley Beyer meanwhile suggests that the name Butuan came from the root word buto (phallus), in connection with the 'Sivaite goddess' called the Golden Tara of Agusan, suggesting that the foundation of the settlement have Hindu origins, as well as calling Butuan a "Madjapahit colony". However, this is still a subject of debate and there are still no definitive answers as to the image or its origins.

== Territory ==
=== Archaeological studies ===
In an archaeological study from 1975 to 1976 in Suatan, 5 kilometers northwest of the port of Masao, they found a burial site with coffins, as well as a site of habitation. A boat was also found in Sitio Ambangan in Barangay Libertad, which was suspected to be a balanghay. Several porcelain were also found dating from the 14th–16th centuries from the Yuan and Ming dynasties, not only from Suatan and Ambangan, but from other places like Kalot, and Mandakpan. It was suggested that these places were under the jurisdiction of Butuan. Meanwhile, the main capital of Butuan was suggested to be around either the Banza or Baug Rivers, as more archaeological findings in the areas suggested pre-Spanish settlements.

In other archaeological studies, such as the study of ceramic utensils, brass wares and weapons, there were various settlements located in Surigao, which included the present site of Barangay Quezon, with scattered river dwellings up to at least what is now the town of Sison. There were bigger hamlets at the Tumanday River, the nearby Lipata and Punta Bilar, as well as Dinagat and Nonoc. There were also sparsely populated settlements in Placer, Gigaquit, Cantilan, Tandag, Hinatuan, Lianga, Lingig, Baganga, and at the mouth of the estuary of Butuan. It was also suggested that at its height between the 11th to 13th centuries, that Butuan had influenced or controlled Eastern Visayas.

=== Spanish accounts ===
According to Pigafetta in 1521, Rajah Siagu's (Note: Rajah Siagu was also called Rajah Siawi.) territory covered the entire territory of Butuan and Caraga while his brother, Rajah Colambu, was the ruler of Limasawa. To add further, in pre-Spanish times, Caraga or Calaga referred to the area from Surigao to Cantilan. However, Fernando Almeda (1993) claims that Butuan's control spanned all the way to Davao Oriental, but further specified that:

"It must be assumed, however, that the raiaship during those days were nothing but petty kingdoms claiming over vast tracts of land, of which the ruler only has loose control, and at best, limited to pockets of coastal villages."

The hinterlands and the ethnic groups within them, such as the Manobos, Mandayas and other tribes, are also excluded from Butuan's sphere of influence and were often at war with it.

According to Spanish reports from 1573, it was reported that several settlements in southern Surigao owned different kinds of gold with different values. The settlements mentioned were Bizlin, Malubay and Linguingin.

== Historiography ==
=== Chinese records ===
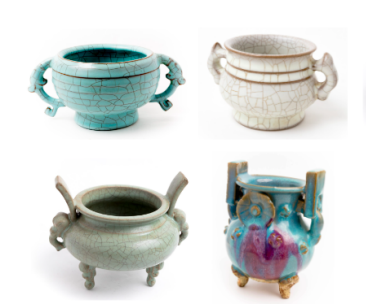
Song dynasty-era (Year 900s) custom-made non-tradeable royal porcelainware excavated in the KPC ("Kalaga (Caraga) Putuan (Butuan) Crescent") Region, also found among the royal courts of the Champa and Srivijaya civilizations, showing how valuable the Rajahnate of Butuan was to Song Dynasty China

Evidence indicates that Butuan was in contact with the Song dynasty by at least 1001 AD. Yuan annal Song Shih recorded the first appearance of a Butuan tributary mission (Lijehan 李竾罕 and Jiaminan) at the Song Court on March 17, 1001, AD. Butuan (or Buotuan 蒲端 in Middle Chinese) around that time was a gold mining and trading hub, known for manufacturing metal tools and weaponry, musical instruments, and gold jewelry.

The Islamic world also had ties to Butuan in the 11th century. Muslim traders acted as envoys on behalf Butuan to the Song dynasty, as they had already been doing for the last few decades for other South East Asian polities like Brunei, Java, Sanfotsi, and Champa. In 1003 and 1011, the Fan Yi chapter of the Song Huiyao Jigao records missions sent by Butuan led by Muslim envoys. A certain Li Yu Xie (李于變), reconstructed as Ali Yusuf, was the leader of the 1011 delegation.

Butuan was described as a Hindu kingdom in alliance with Cebu. Rajah Kiling sent an envoy under I-hsu-han to the Song Court with a formal memorial requesting Butuan equal status with Champa, but was denied for favoritism over the latter.The succeeding Rajah Sri Bata Shaja later succeeded by sending the flamboyant ambassador Likanhsieh, who shocked the Emperor Zhenzong by presenting a memorial engraved on a gold tablet, some white dragon (bailong 白龍) camphor, Moluccan cloves, and a slave on the eve of an important ceremonial state sacrifice. This display of irreverence sparked interest from China, and diplomatic relations between the two polities reached their peak during the Yuan dynasty.

The Sejarah Melayu (Malay Annals) of the nearby country of Malaysia refers to the similarly worded Keling as immigrant people from India. Furthermore, a genetic study of the current Manobo people which inhabit Agusan and Caraga region where Butuan is at show that the ethnic group has 30% South Asian ancestry.

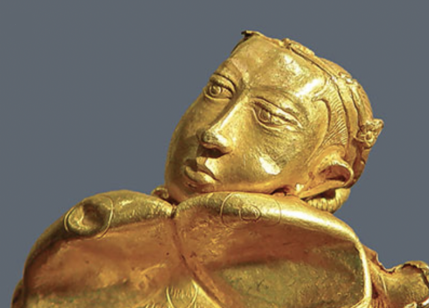
A gold statuette of the Hindu-Buddhist goddess (Devata) "Kinari" found in the Butuan-Caraga region of the Mindanao, Philippines; conforming to the records that Butuan practiced Hinduism.

Later, in 1304, the Chinese annal Nanhai Zhi reported that Pon-i (Brunei) conquered the Philippine kingdoms of Butuan, Sulu, and Ma-i (Mindoro?), which would regain their independence at a later date. After simultaneously regaining their independence, the then-Hindu state of Sulum (founded by Visayan immigrants from Butuan and Surigao to the Sulu Archipelago) invaded Pon-i and pilfered two sacred pearls from the rajah.

=== Spanish colonial period ===
During the Magellan expedition, the first Catholic mass was held in the Philippine archipelago. The mass was held on 31 March 1521 in the island of Mazaua (Limasawa) under Rajah Kolambu, and was accompanied by Rajah Siagu, the Rajah of Butuan at the time.

In 1571, Miguel Lopez de Legazpi allotted various lands in the archipelago as encomiendas, which included the lands of Butuan, Surigao and Caraga, but total incorporation of Butuanons did not happen until the efforts of Jesuit missionaries to convert the people to Christianity.

In 1596, the Spanish Catholic mission headed by the Jesuits under Fr. Valerio de Ledesma began in Butuan to establish a Spanish foothold in Mindanao to combat the rising threat of Moros. On 8 September 1597, the first church was eventually inaugurated in Butuan, subjugating Butuan under Spanish rule. The Augustinian Recollects eventually replaced the Jesuits.

In Historia de las Islas de Mindanao, Iolo, y sus adyacentes ... (1667), Jesuit priest Francisco Combes notes that the Tausug of Sulu at that time still acknowledged their ancestral origins in Butuan.

== Excavated artifacts ==
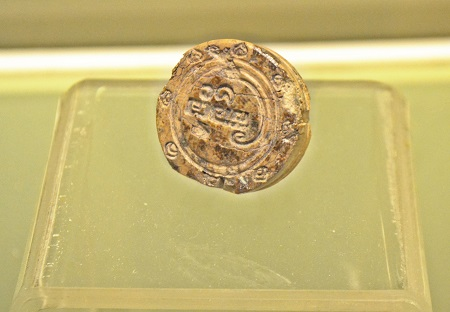
The Butuan Ivory Seal, displayed at the National Museum of the Philippines. The Kawi script lettering says "But-wan", and the smaller lettering (similar to Baybayin) says "Bu-wa" (the diacritics for "Wan/Ban" in Kawi and "Bu/Ba" in the smaller letters have worn off)

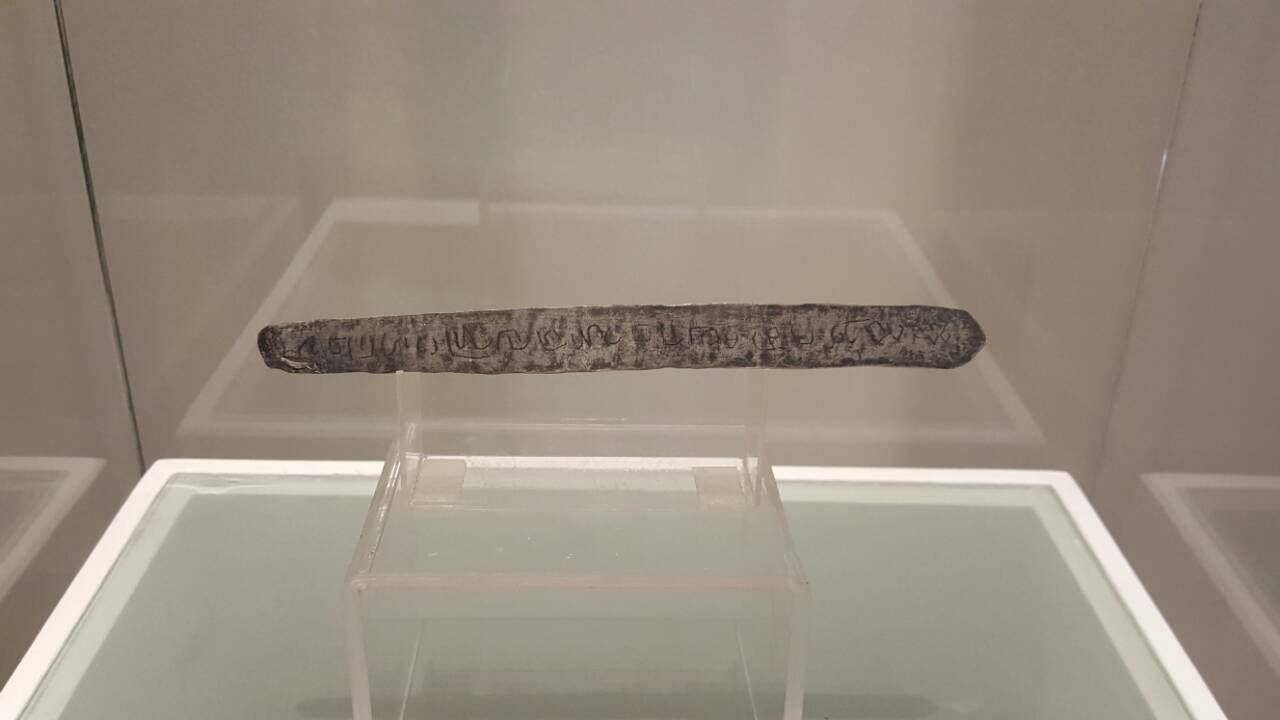
A silver strip excavated from the 1970s in Butuan was inside a wooden coffin. The characters display a Hindu-Buddhist influence, probably a form of early writing in the Philippines (c. 14th–15th century).

Numerous jars have been found in the Butuan area that indicate the wealth of the kingdom and the existence of foreign traditions. Some of these jars have been dated as follows:

- Sathing Phra (900–1100 AD)
- Haripunjaya (800–900 AD)
- Japanese (12th to 16th centuries AD)
- Song dynasty (1001–1271)
- Yuan dynasty (1271–1368)
- Ming dynasty (1368–1521)
- Khmer Empire (802–900 AD)
- Sukhothai Kingdom (1300–1400)
- Champa (1000–1200)
- Persian (9th to 10th centuries AD)

Artifacts have been recovered from within the vicinities of the Ambangan Archeological Site in Libertad that attest to the historical accounts that Butuan traded with India, Japan, Han Chinese, and Southeast Asian countries during these periods.

== Religion ==
It is well known that Butuan, in its early period, was under the influence of Hinduism and Buddhism, especially with the discovery of the Golden Image found at the Wawa River. According to Beyer (1947), that "the non-Mohammedan king was apparently a survival from the old Madjapahit colony of a century earlier". However, by the time of Antonio Pigafetta, the Spaniards discovered that Butuan was undergoing an Islamization phase, with its natives worshipping 'Abba' (Allah), but regardless ate pork. It was clear to the Spaniards that, unlike the sultanates of Lanao, Maguindanao and Sulu, Islam in Butuan only had a superficial impact.

== Recorded monarchs ==
Royal title of the reigning rajah	Events	From	Until
Kiling	Mission by Lijehan and Jiaminan (1003); Mission by I-shu-han (李竾罕) (1007)	1001	1009
Sri Bata Shaja	Mission by Likanhsieh (李于燮)	1011	?
Rajah Siagu	Blood Pact with Ferdinand Magellan	?	1521
Linampas	Son of Siagu	1521	1567
Silongan	Ruler of Butuan, converted to Christianity and baptized as Felipe Silongan	1567	1596

== Modern commentary ==
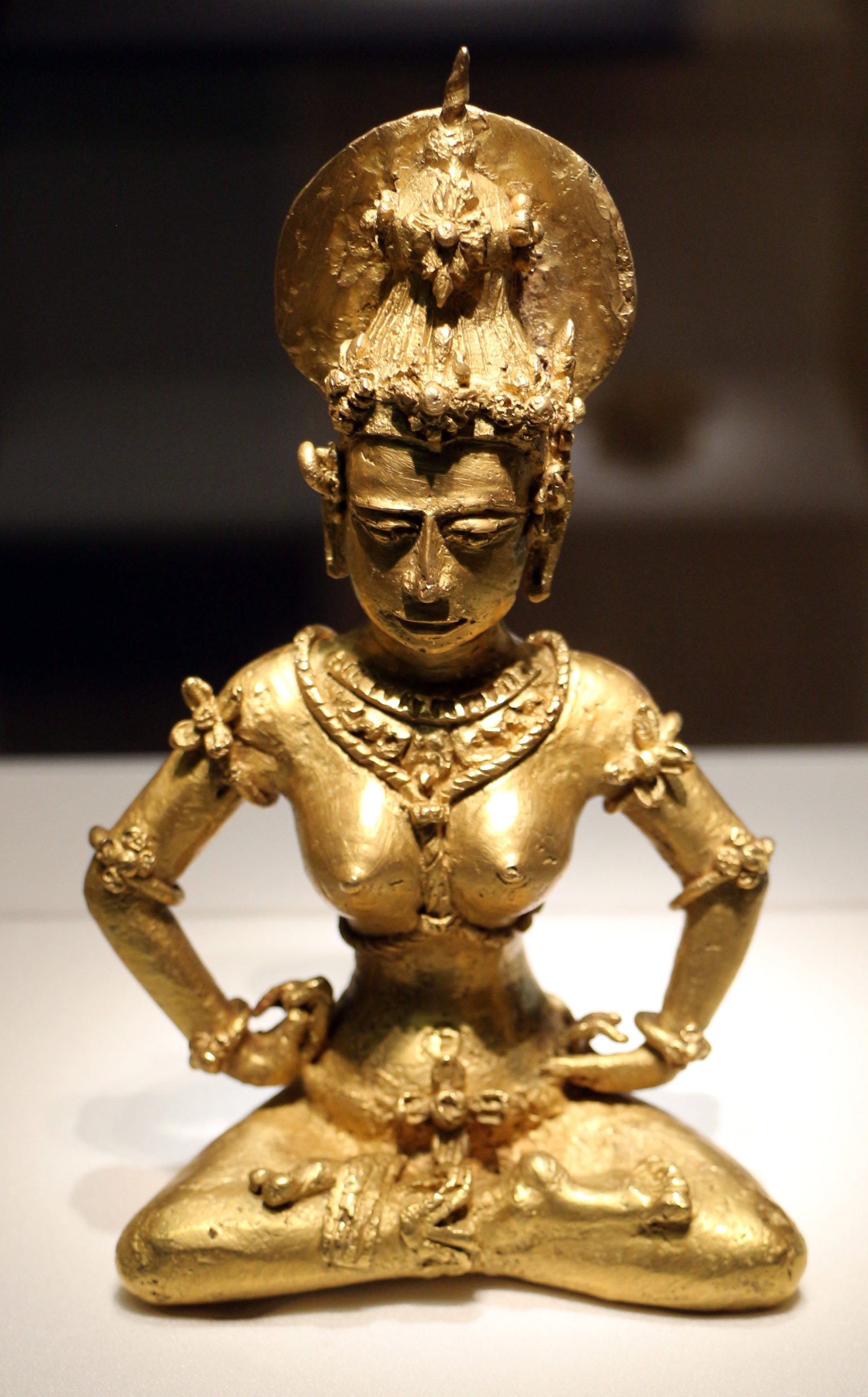
A gold statue of the Hindu-Buddhist goddess (Devata) "Tara" also found in the Butuan-Caraga region showing the extreme abundance of gold in the general area.

Spanish chroniclers, when they set foot on Butuan, remarked that gold was so abundant that even houses were decorated with gold; "Pieces of gold, the size of walnuts and eggs are found by sifting the earth in the island of that king who came to our ships. All the dishes of that king are of gold and also some portion of his house as we were told by that king himself ... He had a covering of silk on his head, and wore two large golden earrings fastened in his ears ... At his side hung a dagger, the haft of which was somewhat long and all of gold, and its scabbard of carved wood. He had three spots of gold on every tooth, and his teeth appeared as if bound with gold." As written by Antonio Pigafetta on Rajah Siagu of Butuan during Magellan's voyage. The relations of Butuan with other Philippine kingdoms are complicated as they had familial links with both Cebu and Sulu Sultanate who were in religious opposition. Rajah Siagu of Butuan was a cousin of Rajah Humabon of Cebu, yet simultaneously to this, Butuan also produced Sultan Batarah Shah Tengah, of Sulu, who ruled as sultan in 1600, that was said to be an actual native of Butuan.

Ancient Butuan used gold in religious images and royal items like crowns, headbands, necklaces, sashes, waistbands, ear ornaments, and bracelets. It was also used in funerals as a death mask, and as a cover for the dead person's eyes, nose, and mouth.

Butuan was so rich in treasures that a museum curator, Florina H. Capistrano-Baker, stated that it was even richer than the more well-known western maritime kingdom of Srivijaya; "The astonishing quantities and impressive quality of gold treasures recovered in Butuan suggest that its flourishing port settlement played an until recently little-recognized role in early Southeast Asian trade. Surprisingly, the amount of gold discovered in Butuan far exceeds that found in Sumatra, where the much better-known flourishing kingdom of Srivijaya is said to have been located."

== See also ==
- Limasawa
- Agusan image
- Butuanon people
- Indian influences in early Philippine polities
