= Rajah Siawi =

- Born: unknown
- Died: unknown
- Other name: Rajah Siagu
- Title: Rajah
- Relatives: Rajah Humabon; Rajah Colambu

Rajah Siawi (sometimes called Rajah Siagu) was the ruler of Butuan and Calaga (Surigao) during the arrival of Ferdinand Magellan in Limasawa Island. A cousin of Rajah Humabon of Cebu, Rajah Siawi was one of the first rulers (along with Rajah Colambu, also from Butuan and Calaga) to accept Christianity and attend the first Catholic mass in the Philippines. Both were on a hunting expedition on Limasawa during their encounter with Magellan.

Rajah Siawi and Rajah Colambu formed a Blood Compact with Ferdinand Magellan in March 1521, claiming ownership of the islands for King Charles V. He named the island as the 'Archipelago of Saint Lazarus' on March 16, 1521.

Rajah Siawi was the first Kalagan person encounter by the Spaniards.
