= Brigido Galasgas =

The Most Reverend Brigido A. Galasgas D.D.
- Vicar Apostolic of Bontoc-Lagawe
- See: Bontoc-Lagawe
- Appointed: April 28, 2018
- Installed: July 11, 2018
- Successor: Francisco F. Claver

Orders
- Ordination: December 28, 1966 by William Brasseur

Personal details
- Born: Brigido Agalpas Galasgas; September 15, 1940 Bokod, Benguet, Philippines
- Died: May 15, 1995 (aged 54)
- Denomination: Roman Catholicism

Brigido Agalpas Galasgas (September 15, 1940 – May 15, 1995) was a Roman Catholic bishop who served as the first Vicar Apostolic of Bontoc-Lagawe.

Galasgas was born in Bokod, Benguet on September 15, 1940. He was ordained to the priesthood in 1966 by Bishop William Brasseur. He was appointed Vicar Apostolic of Bontoc-Lagawe in 1992, following the division of the then Apostolic Vicariate of Montañosa (Mountain Province) into three separate jurisdictions: the Apostolic Vicariate of Bontoc-Lagawe, the Apostolic Vicariate of Tabuk, and the Apostolic Vicariate of Baguio.

He served the vicariate until his death in May 15, 1995 due to cancer. He was succeeded by Francisco F. Claver.

Catholic Church titles
New title	Vicar Apostolic of Bontoc-Lagawe; 1992–1995	Succeeded by Francisco Claver
Preceded by Leonard James Wall	Titular Bishop of Leptiminus; 1992–1995	Succeeded by Jesús Alfonso Guerrero Contreras
