= Claver (surname) =

Claver is a Spanish surname. Notable people with the surname include:

- Francisco Claver (1926–2010), Filipino priest
- Isaac Claver (born 1989), Spanish politician
- Peter Claver (1581–1654), Spanish priest
- Víctor Claver (born 1988), Spanish basketball player

== See also ==
- Mauricio Claver-Carone, American political advocate
- Claver, Surigao del Norte, a municipality in the Philippines
