= Saint Ildephonse of Seville Parish Church (Malasiqui) =

Roman Catholic church in Pangasinan, Philippines

Malasiqui Church
- Saint Ildephonse of Seville Parish Church
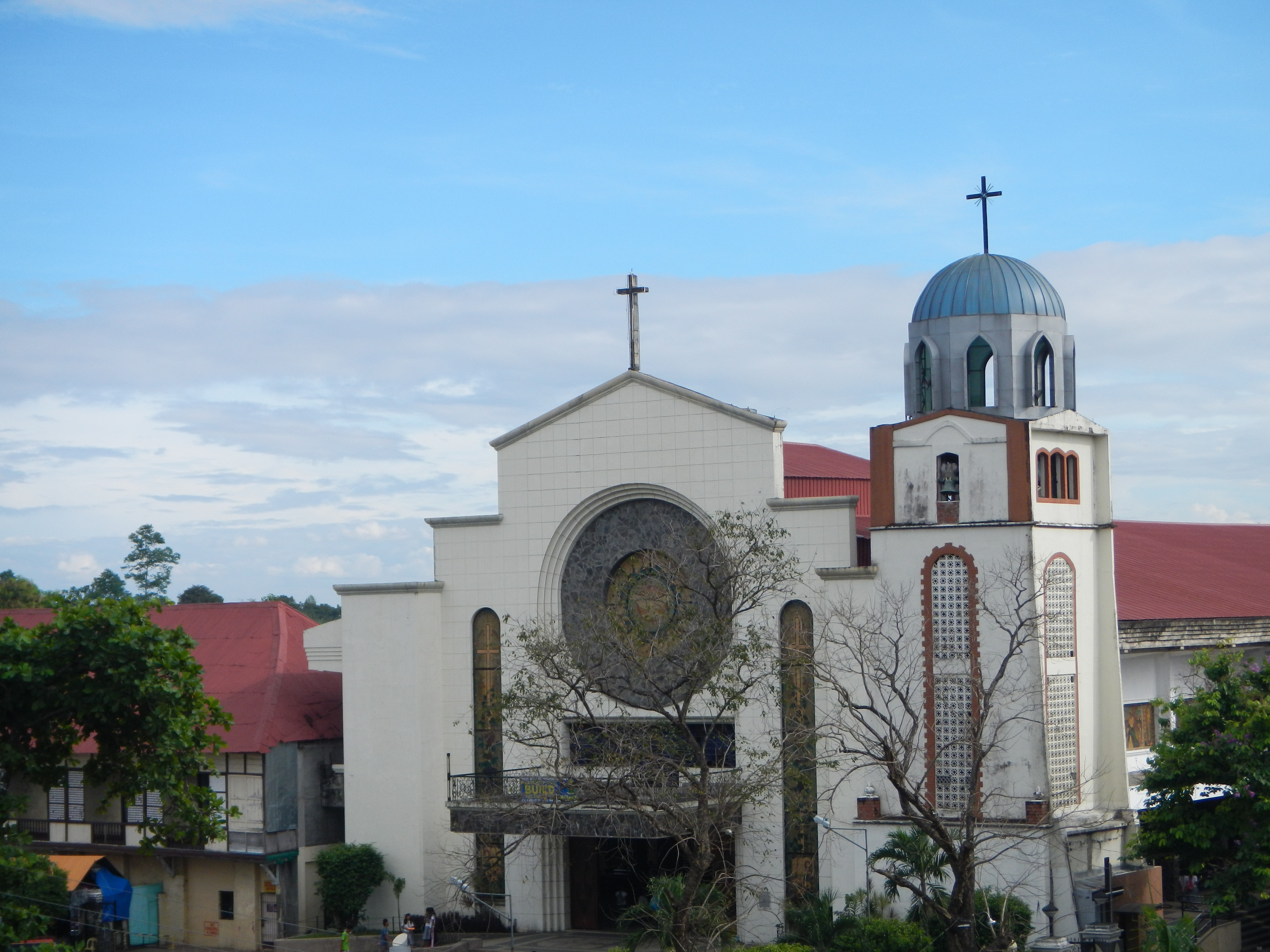
- Church facade in 2012

- Location in Luzon Location in the Philippines
- 15°55′09″N 120°24′48″E
- Location: Malasiqui, Pangasinan
- Country: Philippines
- Denomination: Roman Catholic

History
- Status: Parish church
- Dedication: Saint Ildefonsus

Architecture
- Functional status: Active
- Architectural type: Church building
- Style: Baroque

Administration
- Archdiocese: Lingayen-Dagupan

Clergy
- Archbishop: Socrates B. Villegas
- Priest: Rev. Fr. Mario Dominic C. Sanchez

Saint Ildephonse of Seville Parish Church, commonly known as Malasiqui Church, is a Roman Catholic church in Malasiqui, Pangasinan in the Philippines. It is under the jurisdiction of the Archdiocese of Lingayen-Dagupan and was formerly a chapel under the parish of San Carlos. Father Juan Camacho was appointed first kura paroko and founded the parish in 1665. The 1660 Revolt caused the transfer from San Carlos to its present site at the town of Malasiqui in 1661–1662. The church celebrates its feast every January 23.

== History ==
=== Earlier churches ===
Father Luis Delfin laid down the foundation of the church in 1746, however, the church and convent were burned in 1763. The construction of a brick church began during the incumbency of Father Salvador Tapias in 1773 and it was finished in 1780. However, the church and convent was again caught by fire on February 29, 1820. Both structures underwent repair works three years after. Father Francisco Treserra finished the building of the tower in 1863 and in 1864 he remodeled the sanctuary and the altars. In 1878, the church and the convent were again burned. A new convent was constructed and finished in 1880. An earthquake in the same year occurred which caused the walls of the church to crack. Consequently, Father Jose Ma. Vitrian built a temporary chapel in 1882. Construction of a new church was done by Father Juan Cardaba which was completed before 1885. Another earthquake again destroyed the church on March 16, 1892.

=== Present church ===
Father Salvador Millan built the present church which was finished in 1897. However, another earthquake destroyed the church on July 16, 1990, under Father Abraham R. Esquig. The convent was converted into a Catholic School, with the blessing of Msgr. Mariano Madriaga on July 2, 1972. The reconstruction of the damaged church was planned and executed by Architects Angel B. Abad, Roman A. Macaraeg and Alvin M. Torio during the term of Father Abraham R. Esquig. It was blessed on September 28, 2002.

==== Parish priest ====
The Parish is headed by Rev. Fr. Mario Dominic C. Sanchez. He replaced Rafael Tambaoan Cruz who became the third bishop of Diocese of Baguio.

On June 20, 2024, its outgoing Parish Priest, Rafael Tambaoan Cruz was announced as the third bishop of the Diocese of Baguio, replacing then Bishop Victor Barnuevo Bendico, who was elevated as Capiz Archbishop in May 2023. His episcopal ordination was held on September 7 at Dagupan Cathedral with Socrates Villegas as principal consecrator and Archbishop Charles John Brown. He was installed on September 17 by Archbishop Charles John Brown at Baguio Cathedral.

== Architectural features ==
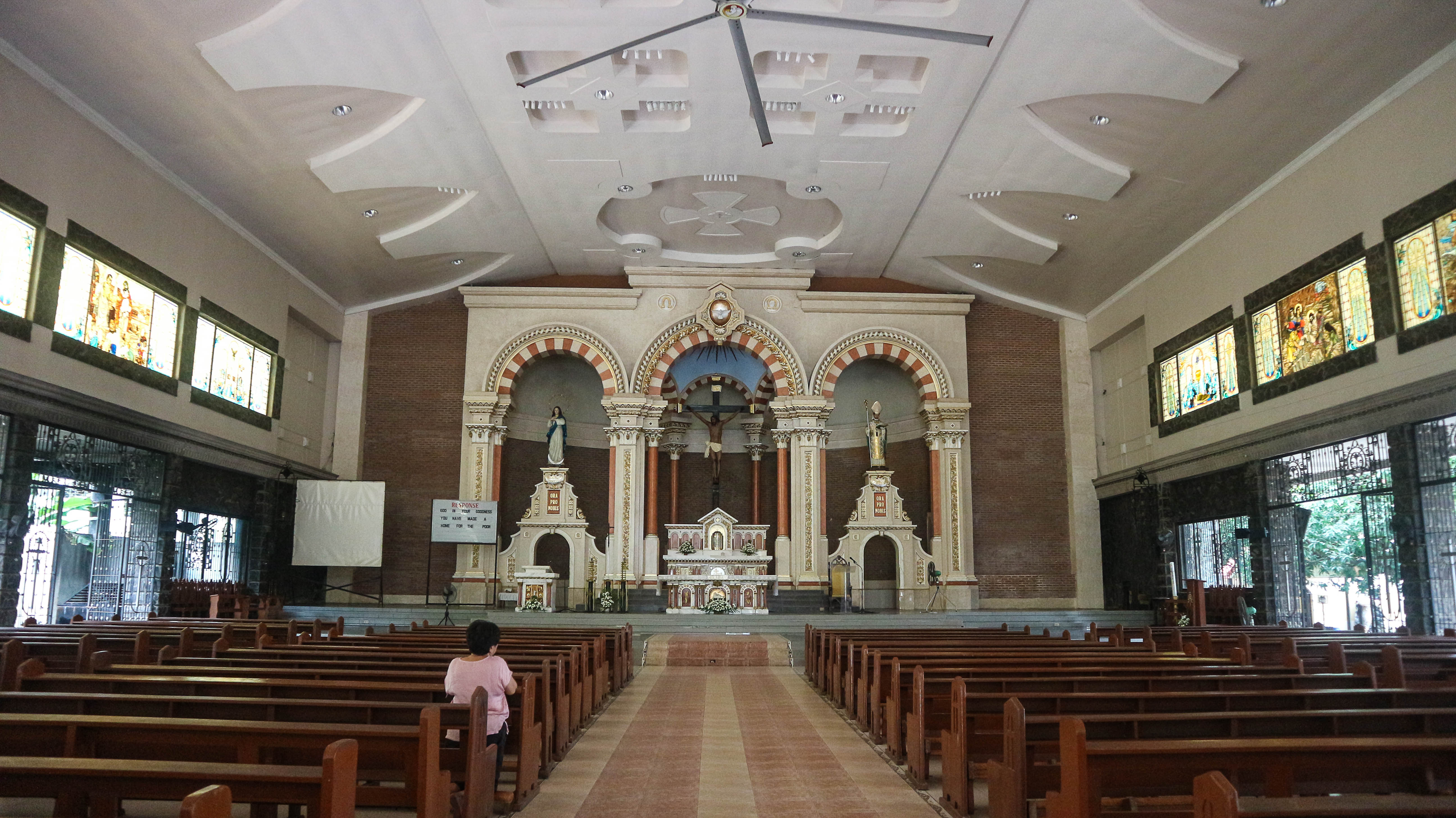
Church interior in 2019

The church measures 70 metres (230 ft) long and 18.5 metres (61 ft) wide. It has a baroque pediment of undulating lines in concave and convexes. The plain facade is broken by pointed plaster reliefs, flanking the windows of the upper level and the super-positioned columns flanked by pilasters.
