= Valentin Cabbigat Dimoc =

Filipino Bishop

The Most Reverend Valentin Dimoc D.D.
- Vicar-Apostolic of Bontoc-Lagawe
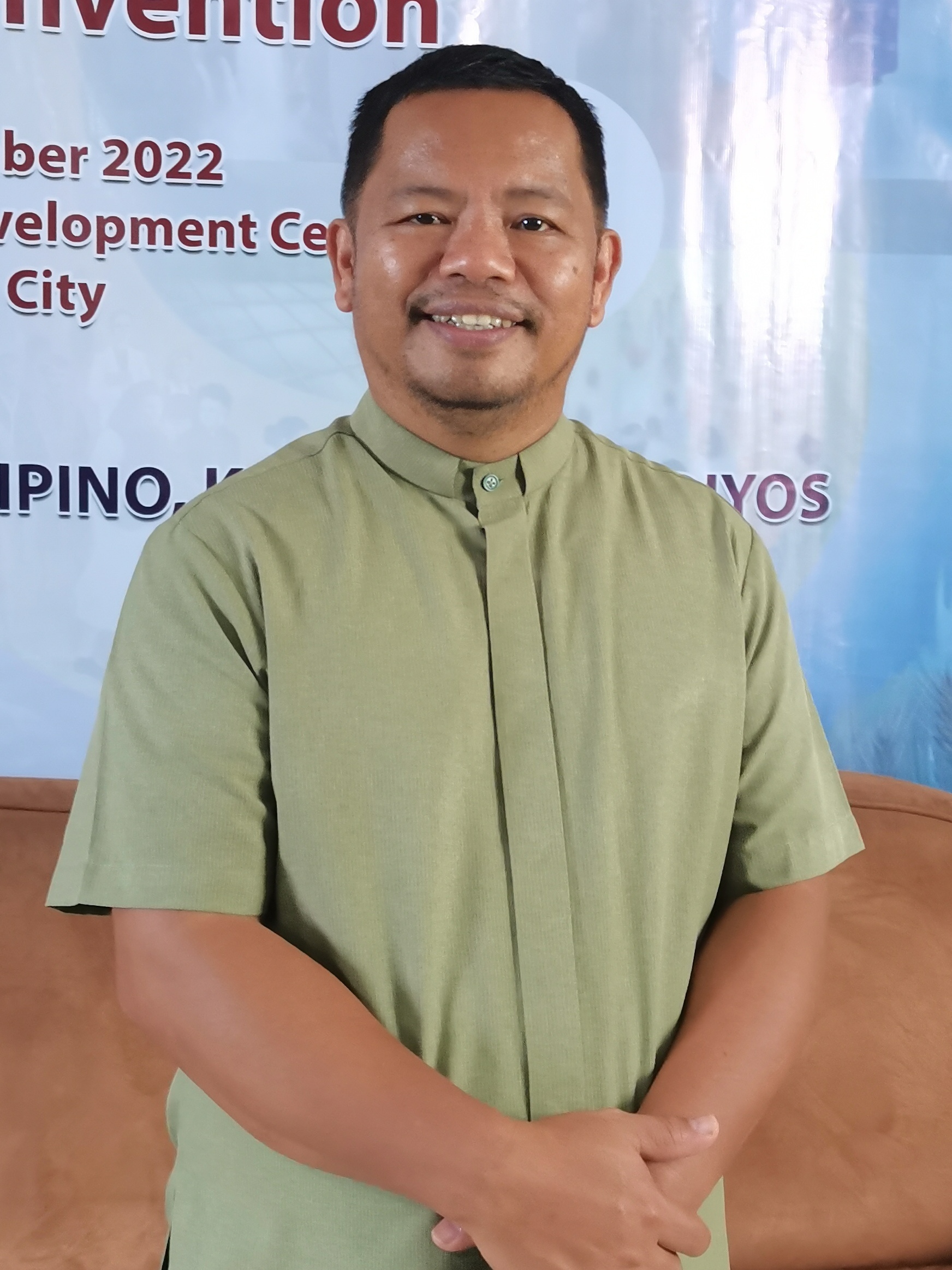
- Bishop Dimoc at Tagaytay City in 2022
- Church: Roman Catholic Church
- Appointed: 6 May 2015
- Predecessor: Rodolfo Fontiveros Beltran

Orders
- Ordination: 19 May 1998 by Francisco Claver
- Consecration: 4 August 2015 by Marlo Mendoza Peralta

Personal details
- Born: Valentin Cabbigat Dimoc; 14 February 1969 (age 57) Lagawe, Ifugao, Philippines
- Denomination: Roman Catholic
- Education: Asian Institute of Management; Immaculate Conception School of Theology
- Motto: Manete In Dilectione Mea; Remain in My Love
- Coat of arms

Styles of Valentin C. Dimoc
- Reference style: His Excellency
- Spoken style: Your Excellency

Valentin Cabbigat Dimoc is a Filipino Bishop and the current Vicar-Apostolic of the Apostolic Vicariate of Bontoc-Lagawe since 2015.

== Early life and education ==
He was born on February 14, 1969, in Lagawe, Ifugao, during Valentine's Day, henceforth his name is Valentin. He is a native from the Tuwali tribe. He studied philosophy and theology at Immaculate Conception School of Theology in Vigan City. He also holds a Master's Degree in development management from the Asian Institute of Management in Makati City.

== Career ==
Due to his indigenous heritage, he was appointed as the chairman of the Episcopal Commission on Indigenous People, an office of the Catholic Bishops' Conference of the Philippines that seeks to promote social welfare among Filipino indigenous people. He has served as rector of the Holy Rosary Mission, Kayan; the Holy Family Mission, Hapao; the St. Mary Magdalene Mission, Lagawe; and the Good Shepherd Mission, Hapid; and as director of the Kataguan Centre, Lagawe. He is currently director of the Centre for Social Action and Development of the apostolic vicariate of Bontoc-Lagawe. In 2015, he was appointed by Pope Francis as Vicar-Apostolic of Bontoc- Lagawe titular bishop of Bapara.

Catholic Church titles
Preceded by Rodolfo Fontiveros Beltran	Vicar-Apostolic of Bontoc-Lagawe; May 6, 2015- present	Incumbent
