= Agathonicea =

Town in Thrace

Agathonice (Greek: Ἀγαθονίκη, romanized: Agathonikē) or Agathonicea (Greek: Ἀγαθονίκεια, romanized: Agathonikeia) was a town and bishopric in Thrace during the Middle Ages. It remains a titular see of the Ecumenical Patriarchate of Constantinople, of the Bulgarian Orthodox Church, and of the Roman Catholic Church.

== History ==
Agathonice is most likely to be identified with the modern settlement of Oryahovo in southern Bulgaria.

It is first mentioned in the Suleymanskyoy Inscription, which lists the terms of the Byzantine–Bulgarian treaty of 815, among the border towns between the Byzantine Empire and the Bulgar Khanate.

In 1095, during his campaign against the Cumans, Emperor Alexios I Komnenos came to the town.

== Orthodox see ==
The town is attested as a bishopric, as the first among the suffragan sees of the metropolitan see of Philippopolis, in the Notitiae Episcopatuum of the Patriarchate of Constantinople from the 10th to the 12th century. Only one bishop, Basil, is known, from the second half of the 11th century.

Agathonicea remains a titular see of the Patriarchate of Constantinople. Until 1860, it was often a title given to an auxiliary bishop to the Metropolitan of Philippopolis, who resided at the town of Tatar Pazardzhik. The most recent incumbents were:

- Bishop Orestes Chornock, 18.9.1938–17.2.1977 (†) (titular Metropolitan since 1966), Auxiliary Bishop of the Greek Orthodox Archdiocese of America for the American Carpatho-Russian Orthodox Diocese
- Metropolitan Apostolos Daniilidis, 26.11.1995–4.9.2000

In the 20th century, the Bulgarian Orthodox Church also began appointing titular bishops of Agathonicea:

- Bishop Naum Shotlev, 28.11.1982–31.3.2005 (†)
- Bishop Boris Dobrev, since 22.3.2008

== Catholic titular see ==
The diocese was nominally restored as a Roman Catholic titular bishopric in the 18th century. Its incumbents were:

- Ferdinand Oesterhoff, O. Cist. (1723.12.20 – 1748.10.22)
- Jean-Baptiste Lamy (1850.07.23 – 1853.07.29) (later Archbishop)
- Pasquale Pagnucci (林奇愛), O.F.M. (1867.04.15 – 1901.01.29)
- William Brasseur, C.I.C.M. (1948.06.10 – death 1993.02.01), Apostolic Vicar of Mountain Provinces (Philippines) (1948.06.10 – 1981.11.07)
