= Vagrauta =

Historic site in present day Algeria

Vagrauta also known as Vagrautensis was a Roman and Byzantine era settlement in the Berber kingdom of Numidia. The site has not been satisfactorily identified though it is in modern Algeria.

== Bishopric of Vagrauta ==
The town was the seat of an ancient diocese. Its one known bishop, Marcellenius, took part in the Council of Carthage (484) held by the Vandal king Huneric. He was later exiled.

The bishopric ceased to function with the arrival of the Umayyad Caliphate in the 7th century. In 1933, the diocese was reestablished in name as a titular see. There have been four bishops since then including long-term bishop Geoffrey Ignatius Burke and George Leo Thomas. The current bishop is Juan Frausto Pallares who replaced Cornelio Galleo Wigwigan in December 2005.
