= Apostolic Vicariate of Bontoc–Lagawe =

Catholic jurisdiction in the Philippines

Roman Catholic Apostolic Vicariate of Bontoc–Lagawe Vicariatus Apostolicus Bontocensis–Lagavensis Apostoliko Bikariyato ng Bontoc–Lagawe Apostolico Vicariato de Bontoc–Lagawe

Catholic

Location
- Country: Philippines
- Territory: Mountain Province and Ifugao
- Ecclesiastical province: Immediately subject to the Holy See

Statistics
- Area: 4,615 km^{2} (1,782 sq mi)
- Population: Total; Catholics: (as of 2021); 366,766; 221,750 (60.5%)
- Parishes: 21

Information
- Denomination: Catholic Church
- Sui iuris church: Latin Church
- Rite: Roman Rite
- Established: July 6, 1992
- Cathedral: Cathedral of Sta. Rita de Cascia
- Secular priests: 30

Current leadership
- Pope: Leo XIV
- Vicar Apostolic: Valentin Cabbigat Dimoc

Map
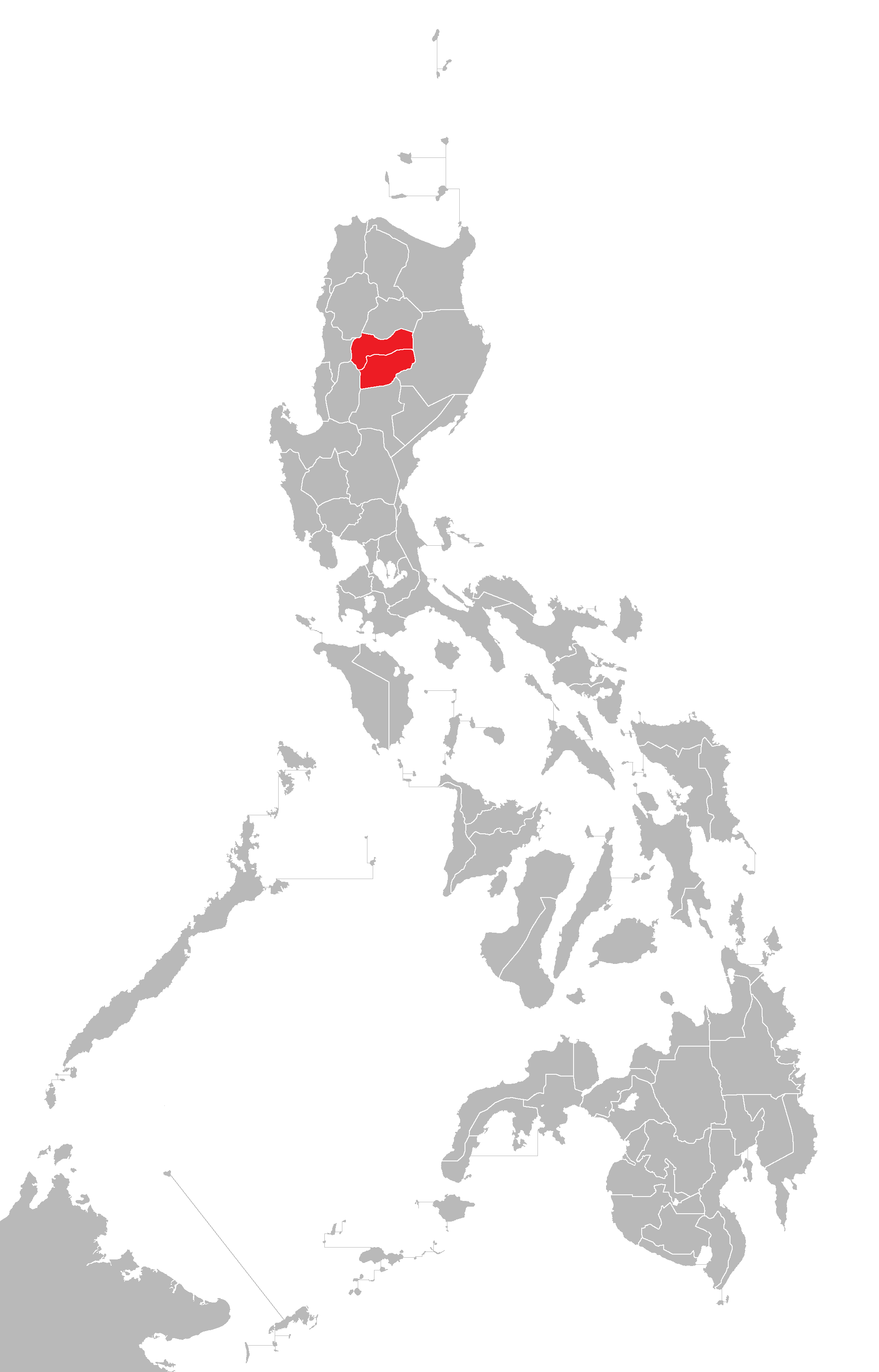
- Jurisdiction/Territory of the Roman Catholic Apostolic Vicariate of Bontoc-Lagawe.

The Apostolic Vicariate of Bontoc–Lagawe (in Latin: Vicariatus Apostolicus Bontocensis–Lagavensis) is a Latin Church missionary ecclesiastical jurisdiction or apostolic vicariate of the Catholic Church in the Philippines.

It is directly exempt the Holy See, not part of any ecclesiastical province, and directly under the jurisdiction of the Pope who exercises authority through the bishop-in-charge known as the Vicar Apostolic. For the purpose of apostolic cooperation, usually grouped with the Archdiocese of Nueva Segovia. It also has a working partnership with the Apostolic Vicariate of Tabuk and the Diocese of Baguio, both in the Cordilleras, to coordinate Catholic missions among the Igorot tribes. The Apostolic Vicariate operates a liaison office in the compound of Baguio Cathedral.

On 6 May 2015, Pope Francis appointed Valentin Dimoc as its fifth bishop, after the vicariate was without bishop for three years.

== Territory ==
The apostolic vicariate comprises the two civil provinces of Ifugao and Mountain Province. Based on NSO record of 2007, there are about 190,000 Catholics in the jurisdiction. The seat of the vicariate is the town of Bontoc, where the Santa Rita of Cascia Cathedral and the vicarial chancery, known as the Teng-ab Pastoral Complex, are located. The territory is divided into 21 parishes.

== History ==
Records from Santa Rita Parish of Bontoc reveal that the first baptism held in Bontoc was administered by Augustinian priest Jose Iglesia on 28 November 1893. Spanish missionaries however abandoned the Bontoc Mission sometime in 1898. After a lull for almost a decade, a group of Belgian CICM missionaries led by Constance Jurgens and Jules Sepulchre arrived in Bontoc in time to celebrate a midnight mass on 24 December 1907

On 10 June 1948, Pope Pius XII established the Apostolic Vicariate of the Mountain Province, formerly known as the Apostolic Prefecture of the Montañosa. Eleven days after, on 21 June, Vatican appointed the Belgian missionary, Bishop William Brasseur as its first Vicar Apostolic.

The apostolic vicariate was erected on 6 July 1992 with the apostolic constitution Ad aptius in Insulis Philippinis of Pope John Paul II. Bontoc-Lagawe was one among the three vicariates created by dividing the old Vicariate of Montañosa into three: the Vicariates of Baguio (elevated into a diocese in 2004), Tabuk and Bontoc-Lagawe.

Assisting the Vicar Apostolic in the governance of pastoral welfare is the Vicariate Mission Council. All members of the presbyterium form this council which meets regularly every quarter. However, it is the prerogative of the Vicar Apostolic to convene the mission council as the need arises.

== Apostolic Vicars ==
Apostolic Vicars		Period in Office	Coat of Arms
1.	Brigido A. Galasgas	July 6, 1992 – May 15, 1995, Died	
2.	Francisco F. Claver	November 2, 1995 – April 15, 2004, Retired	
3.	Cornelio G. Wigwigan	March 19, 2004 – May 16, 2005, Died	
Vacant (May 17, 2005 – March 17, 2006)
4.	Rodolfo F. Beltran	March 18, 2006 — October 30, 2012 appointed Bishop of San Fernando de La Union	
Vacant (January 2013 – May 2015)
5.	Valentin C. Dimoc	May 6, 2015 — present	

== See also ==
- Roman Catholicism in Philippines
