= Rafael T. Cruz =

Filipino Roman Catholic bishop (born 1960)

His Excellency, The Most Reverend Rafael T. Cruz D.D.
- Bishop of Baguio
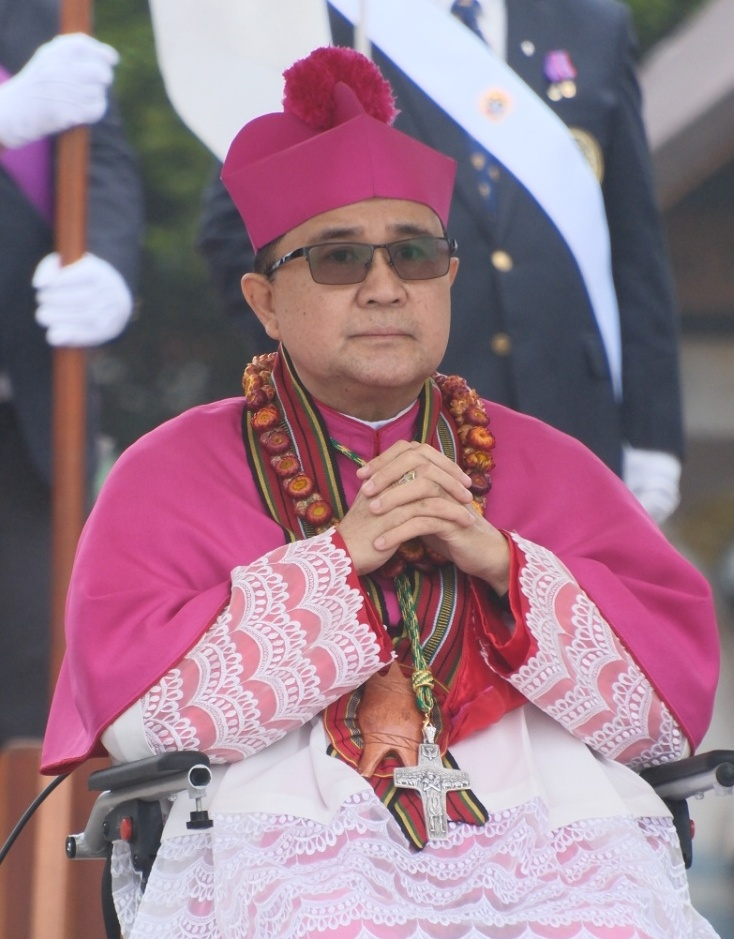
- Cruz in 2024
- Church: Roman Catholic Church
- Province: Nueva Segovia
- Diocese: Baguio
- Appointed: June 20, 2024
- Installed: September 17, 2024
- Predecessor: Victor Bendico

Orders
- Ordination: September 7, 1985 by Federico G. Limon SVD
- Consecration: September 7, 2024 by Socrates B. Villegas OP

Personal details
- Born: Rafael Tambaoan Cruz; March 12, 1960 (age 66) Mapandan, Pangasinan, Philippines
- Education: San Pablo Regional College Seminary
- Motto: Quid Faceret Iesus "What would Jesus do?"
- Coat of arms: Rafael T. Cruz's coat of arms

Ordination history
History
Priestly ordination
- Ordained by: Federico G. Limon SVD
Episcopal consecration
- Principal consecrator: Socrates Villegas OP
- Co-consecrators: Victor Bendico; Jesse Mercado
- Styles
- Reference style: His Excellency; The Most Reverend
- Spoken style: Your Excellency
- Religious style: Bishop

Rafael Tambaoan Cruz (born March 12, 1960) is a Filipino bishop of the Roman Catholic Church who serves as the third bishop of the Diocese of Baguio since 2024.

== Early life and education ==
Cruz was born on March 12, 1960, in Mapandan, Pangasinan, Philippines. He studied Bachelor of Arts in philosophy at San Pablo Regional College Seminary in Baguio City from 1977 to 1981 followed by Bachelor of Sacred Theology at the Immaculate Conception School of Theology in Vigan, Ilocos Sur, from 1981 to 1985. He furthered his studies with a master's degree in counseling psychology and earned a doctorate in clinical psychology from Ateneo de Manila University.

He subsequently completed his residency training at Loyola University Chicago and the Carl Jung Institute of Evanston, Illinois.

== Priesthood ==
Cruz was ordained a priest on September 7, 1985, for the Archdiocese of Lingayen-Dagupan. Early in his ministry, he served as an assistant pastor at Saints Peter and Paul Parish in Calasiao, Pangasinan, from 1985 to 1987. He later worked as a guest priest in the Archdiocese of Manila, serving in various capacities including at the RVM Sisters Regional House in Singalong, Sto. Cristo in Las Piñas, and the Divine Mercy Shrine in Mandaluyong. He also served as chaplain of Our Lady of Remedies Chapel in Quezon City. From 1999 to 2004, he was a visiting professor at the Loyola School of Theology at Ateneo de Manila University. In 2004, he became a lecturer at the Center for Family Ministries at Ateneo de Manila University and served as a spiritual director and psychological advisor to seminarians in the Territorial Prelature of Batanes. From 2011 to 2018, he was a spiritual director and teacher at the Mary Help of Christians High School Seminary and the Mary Help of Christians College Seminary in Pangasinan. He also served as parish priest and vicar forane of Saint Thomas Aquinas Parish in Mangaldan, Pangasinan, from 2018 to 2022. From 2022 until his appointment as Bishop he is the Parish Priest and Vicar Forane of St. Ildephonse of Seville in Poblacion, Malasiqui, Pangasinan.

Since 2022, he has been a member of the Permanent Committee for the Protection of Minors of the Catholic Bishops' Conference of the Philippines and a visiting lecturer at several theological seminaries.

== Episcopacy ==
On June 20, 2024, Pope Francis appointed Cruz as the Bishop of Baguio, succeeding Victor Bendico who was named Archbishop of Capiz in 2023. He received episcopal consecration on September 7, 2024, at St. John the Evangelist Cathedral in Dagupan City. Due to a leg injury sustained shortly before his ordination, Bishop Cruz participated in the ceremony from a wheelchair.

He was formally installed as the third bishop of Baguio on September 17, 2024, at the Baguio Cathedral, with Apostolic Nuncio to the Philippines, Archbishop Charles John Brown, presiding over the installation rites and Manila Archbishop Jose Cardinal Advincula being the homilist.

Catholic Church titles
Preceded by Victor Bendico	Bishop of Baguio; September 17, 2024 – present	Incumbent
