= Sean Buslig Mejia =

Filipino Catholic priest and vicar apostolic of Tabuk

The Most Reverend Sean Buslig Mejia D.D., JCL
- Vicar Apostolic of Tabuk
- Church: Roman Catholic Church
- Diocese: Apostolic Vicariate of Tabuk
- Appointed: March 3, 2026
- Installed: June 2, 2026
- Predecessor: Prudencio Andaya Jr.

Orders
- Ordination: October 19, 1999 by Carlito Joaquin Cenzon
- Consecration: June 2, 2026 by Charles John Brown

Personal details
- Born: March 3, 1972 (age 54) Bulanao, Tabuk, Kalinga, Philippines
- Education: San Pablo Seminary, Baguio City; Immaculate Conception School of Theology, Vigan City; Pontifical Urban University, Rome
- Motto: Misericors amor eius aeternus est (Latin for 'His merciful love is eternal')
- Coat of arms: Sean Buslig Mejia's coat of arms

Ordination history
History
Episcopal consecration
- Principal consecrator: Charles John Brown
- Co-consecrators: Ricardo Baccay; Prudencio Andaya Jr.
- Styles
- Reference style: His Excellency; The Most Reverend
- Spoken style: Your Excellency
- Religious style: Bishop

Sean Buslig Mejia (born March 3, 1972) is a Filipino Catholic prelate and canon lawyer who has been the vicar apostolic of Tabuk since June 2, 2026.

== Early life and education ==
Mejia was born in Bulanao, Tabuk, in the province of Kalinga. He completed his philosophical studies at San Pablo Seminary in Baguio City and his theological studies at the Immaculate Conception School of Theology in Vigan City. Mejia later obtained a licentiate in canon law from the Pontifical Urban University in Rome.

== Priesthood ==
On October 19, 1999, Mejia was ordained a priest for the Apostolic Vicariate of Tabuk. His pastoral assignments included serving as a parochial vicar of the Flora Catholic Mission, head of the Lubuagan Catholic Mission, and parish priest of St. William's Cathedral in Tabuk City.

In addition to his pastoral work, Mejia held several educational and administrative roles. He served as a formator at the Immaculate Conception School of Theology and San Pablo College Seminary in Vigan, chairman of the vicariate's education commission, superintendent of Catholic Schools in Tabuk, and president of St. Louis College of Bulanao. Within the administration of the vicariate, he also functioned as the vicariate's chancellor, vicar general, and director of the Faith and Doctrine Commission and Ecology Desk.

== Episcopacy ==
On February 3, 2025, the Apostolic Vicariate of Tabuk became vacant when its second apostolic vicar, Prudencio Andaya Jr., was transferred to the Diocese of Cabanatuan. To temporarily manage the jurisdiction's governance and pastoral care of the northern provinces of Kalinga and Apayao, papal nuncio Archbishop Charles John Brown appointed Mejia as pro-apostolic vicar on March 31, 2025.

Pope Leo XIV officially appointed Mejia as the third vicar apostolic of Tabuk on March 3, 2026, Mejia's 54th birthday. He was consecrated bishop and installed on June 2, 2026.

Catholic Church titles
Preceded by Prudencio Andaya Jr.	Vicar Apostolic of Tabuk; June 2, 2026 – present	Incumbent
