= Prudencio Andaya Jr. =

Filipino Catholic prelate (born 1959)

The Most Reverend Prudencio Padilla Andaya Jr. CICM
- Bishop of Cabanatuan
- Appointed: 8 December 2024
- Installed: 3 February 2025
- Previous post: Apostolic Vicar of Tabuk (2003–2024)

Orders
- Ordination: 8 December 1986
- Consecration: 16 July 2003 by Antonio Franco

Personal details
- Born: 2 January 1959 (age 67) Lubuagan, Mountain Province, Philippines
- Motto: Caritas Christi Urget Nos; The Love of Christ, Impels Us.
- Coat of arms

Prudencio Padilla Andaya Jr. CICM (2 January 1959) is a Filipino Catholic Bishop who is serving as the Bishop of Cabanatuan following his appointment on 8 December 2024 by Pope Francis and his installation on 3 February 2025.

== Early life ==
Andaya was born on 2 January 1959 in Lubuagan in the Philippines. He studied at the Maryhurst Seminary from 1975 to 1977 and at St. Louis University from 1977 to 1979.

He studied French in Belgium from 1980 to 1983. He had an internship in Zambia from 1984 to 1986 where he learned the Bemba language.

Andaya is fluent in English, Tagalog, Iloko and French.

== Ministry ==
Andaya's personal coat of arms as the Apostolic Vicar of Tabuk.

Andaya was ordained a priest on 8 December 1986 and started working as an assistant parish priest at the Kapisha Parish in Zambia in 1997. In 1989, he became the head parish priest of the Kapisha Parish.

In 1991, Andaya became a District Superior at the CICM Zambia, a position he held until 1997. In 1998, he became a Socius at the CICM Novitate in Taytay, Rizal, and later became the Director of Novices in 1999, a position he held until 2003 following his episcopal appointment.

In 2003, John Paul II appointed and installed Andaya as the Apostolic Vicar of Tabuk on 16 July.

In 2024, Pope Francis appointed him as the Bishop of Cabanatuan, and he was officially installed on 3 February 2025.

Catholic Church titles
Preceded by Sofronio Bancud	Bishop of Cabanatuan; 3 February 2025 – present	Incumbent
Preceded by Carlito Joaquin Cenzon	Vicar Apostolic of Tabuk; 16 July 2003 – 8 December 2024	Succeeded by Sean Buslig Mejia
