= William Brasseur =

Belgian bishop (1903–1993)

The Most Reverend William Brasseur D.D.
- Vicar Apostolic Emiritus of the Mountain Province
- See: Mountain Province (Montañosa)
- Appointed: June 10, 1948
- Installed: November 7, 1948
- Term ended: November 7, 1981
- Successor: Emiliano Kulhi Madangeng

Orders
- Ordination: August 18, 1929
- Consecration: August 24, 1948 by Guglielmo Piani

Personal details
- Born: 12 January 1903 Marke, Belgium
- Died: 1 February 1993 (aged 90) Baguio, Philippines
- Denomination: Catholic
- Motto: "Anima Una" (One Soul)
- Coat of arms

Styles of William Brasseur
- Reference style: His Excellency; The Most Reverend
- Spoken style: Your Excellency
- Religious style: Bishop

William Brasseur, CICM (January 12, 1903 – February 1, 1993), was a Belgian bishop and missionary of the Catholic Church who served as the first Vicar Apostolic of the Mountain Province (later known as the Roman Catholic Diocese of Baguio) from 1948 to 1981.

== Early life and priesthood ==
Brasseur was born on January 12, 1903, in Marke, Belgium in the Diocese of Bruges. He joined the Congregation of the Immaculate Heart of Mary (CICM) and was ordained a priest on August 18, 1929. In 1931, he was assigned to the Philippines as part of the CICM missionary thrust to evangelize the remote mountain areas in Northern Luzon. He was reassigned to Belgium for three years from 1935 until 1938 to teach at the University of Louvain's CICM School of Theology. He then returned to the Philippines and was assigned to Kabayan, Benguet. He later served as Parish Priest in Baguio Cathedral and Provincial Superior of CICM.

== Episcopal ministry ==
On June 10, 1948, Pope Pius XII appointed Brasseur as the first Apostolic Vicar of the Mountain Province (Montañosa), which included present-day Benguet, Mountain Province, Ifugao, and Kalinga. He was consecrated Titular Bishop of Agathonice on August 24, 1948, by then Archbishop of Manila, Michael J. O'Doherty assisted by Bishop Santiago Sancho and Bishop Constant Jurgens of Tuguegarao.

== Retirement and death ==
After serving as apostolic vicar for 33 years, Brasseur resigned in 1981. He then served as the chaplain of the Notre Dame de Chartres Hospital in Baguio until his death on February 3, 1993, at the age of 90.

== Legacy ==
During World War II, Brasseur supported Filipino guerrillas resisting Japanese occupation. Later, he actively opposed the Marcos dictatorship during martial law.

He was affectionately called "Apo Monsignor", a title of respect among locals. He was fluent in Ilocano, Ibaloi, and Kankanaey, and was granted honorary Filipino citizenship in 1961.

In 1952, he worked with the Congregation of Our Lady of Charity of the Good Shepherd to establish the Mountain Maid Training and Development Foundation, the maker of the famous Ube Jam and other souvenir products of Baguio.

Bishop Brasseur is credited with laying the foundations of the Catholic Church in the Cordillera region, especially among indigenous Igorot communities. From 1948 to 1981, he ordained 29 native priests and consecrated one bishop. He also established 59 schools, 2 seminaries, 44 mission stations, 8 rural hospitals, and 20 dispensaries across the Mountain Province. In 1992 or one year before his death, the Apostolic Vicariate of Montañosa was divided into three jurisdictions: Baguio, Bontok-Lagawe, and Tabuk.

New title	Vicar Apostolic of Mountain Province (Montañosa); 1948–1993	Succeeded by Emiliano Kulhi Madangeng
Preceded by Pasquale Pagnucci	Titular Bishop of Agathonice; 1948–1993	Succeeded by Sede vacante
