= Atonement Academy =

The Atonement Catholic Academy

Location
- 15415 Red Robin Road; San Antonio, (Bexar County), Texas 78255; United States; 29°35′15″N 98°38′42″W

Information
- Type: Private, Coeducational
- Motto: Fides et Ratio (Faith and Reason)
- Religious affiliation: Roman Catholic
- Patron saint: The Blessed Virgin Mary under the title of Our Lady of the Atonement
- Established: 1994
- Closed: 2025
- School district: Personal Ordinariate of the Chair of Saint Peter
- Grades: Pre-K4 through 12th grade
- Average class size: 10-30 students
- Classes offered: All grades offer a full range of math, science, social studies, foreign languages, English, religion, music, and physical education instruction, appropriate to grade
- Hours in school day: 8
- Colors: Red and Black
- Sports: Football, Basketball, Volleyball, Track, Baseball, Wrestling, Cross-country
- Mascot: The Crusader (a medieval knight emblazoned with the Jerusalem Cross)
- Team name: Crusaders
- Accreditation: Texas Catholic Conference Education Department
- Tuition: ~$10,000 per year
- Website: theatonementacademy.org

The Atonement Catholic Academy was a parochial, Catholic school in the Personal Ordinariate of the Chair of Saint Peter in San Antonio, Texas. It was a part of Our Lady of the Atonement Catholic parish, the first parish for the Anglican Use liturgy with the Catholic Church, and was opened on August 15, 1994. The college preparatory school curriculum was inaugurated in 2004, the first seniors graduating in 2008. The school seal was the pelican. The student population for the 2024-2025 school year totaled approximately 275 students. The school closed in May 2025, and the main school building is now being leased to Valor of San Antonio.

== The church and school building ==
The sanctuary was of the traditional style with a central nave leading to an East-facing altar. It was decorated with many meaningful symbols of the Catholic faith, especially the fish net-like matrix that covered the entire ceiling, which symbolized the Christian church's role in evangelization. The school building abutted the church and was centered around the library. The gymnasium completed the structure on the opposite side of the school building from the church. The exterior walls of the complex were styled to resemble a medieval castle.

== Curriculum ==
The minimum requirements for high school graduation were established by the Texas Catholic Conference Education Department. A college prep diploma in the Catholic schools of Texas required three years of a foreign language, and all three years had to be in the same language. Additionally, beginning in the 2010–2011 school year, a "four by four" policy had been implemented, mandating four years of math and science at the high school level.

The Atonement Academy offered a wide variety of classes including grammar and literature, science, Texas, U.S., and World history, U.S. government, and economics. Advanced Placement courses were available to the juniors and seniors in areas such as American Literature, World Literature, American Government, American History, Biology, Statistics, and Calculus. A required classical language course, Latin, was taught in the elementary, middle and high school grades.

Students in grades 1-8 participated in the Accelerated Reader (AR) program. There was a quarterly awards ceremony in which the students were recognized for their academic excellence. Rarely, teachers held advanced degrees in their specialties.

In the College Preparatory School (grades 9–12), the typical basic yearly course load was 7+1/4 credits. In addition to the 7+1/4-credit basic load, a few additional requirements had to be met, either by having completed them in middle school, or by taking them during the elective period.

High school-level courses were completed by some students in middle school, including Algebra I and Geometry.

== Fine arts ==
The music program was centered on choral instruction, where the various student choirs played a part in the liturgy of the Mass. There were several choral concerts throughout the year as well as a series of sacred music performances. Many of the academy's students also participated in extracurricular arts activities such as theater performances.

== Athletics, extracurricular activities, and events ==
Sports teams included boys' varsity basketball, track and cross country, baseball, six-man football, and golf, girls' varsity basketball, volleyball, track, and cross-country. School colors were black and red, and the school team name was the Crusaders. A playing field adjacent to the church parking lot was designed to accommodate both football and baseball.

Other, non-academic activities that were supported included Scouting (both boys and girls), chess club, National Honor Society and Student Council. Yearly events included the Upper School Tea and the King's Fair (a medieval fair).

Every other year until 2020, the students of the academy had an opportunity to go on a parish-wide pilgrimage to Rome, and attend Mass in some of the greatest churches in Christendom.

== Uniform requirements and comportment guidelines ==
Students at The Atonement Academy were required to wear an academic uniform as well as a standardized physical education uniform. The high school uniforms in particular were noteworthy for their elegance, maturity, and strict modesty, and in the junior and senior years include the class ring.

The class ring was a signet ring that featured the school's crest and was given to juniors in a special ceremony during Mass. The class ring then would become a part of the student's official uniform.

== Counseling services ==
The students had access to a number of extracurricular counseling services. For the upper grades a full range of college counseling services were offered, with information available for a wide range of Catholic, private, and state institutions.

== Economical and academic decline and closure ==
The school would start to experience economical and academic decline around the late 2010s and early 2020s. A noticeable decline in admissions and enrollment would lead the school into harsh economical conditions. In order to remain operational, the school would have to rely on the constant funding from the Our Lady of the Atonement parish as well as exponentially increasing the cost of enrollment each year. Unfortunately, these methods would not be viable for a long period of time.

On May 31, 2025, the Parochial Administrator, Rev. Richard Kramer, would announce the closure of the Atonement Academy due to its continued lack in enrollment and funding. Additionally, the school property was leased to a local tuition-free classical education school, Valor Education.
