= Cornelio Wigwigan =

Filipino Catholic bishop (1942–2005)

The Most Reverend Cornelio Wigwigan D.D.
- Vicar Apostolic of Bontoc-Lagawe
- Province: Immediately subject to the Holy See
- See: Bontoc-Lagawe
- Appointed: April 15, 2004
- Installed: July 14, 2004
- Predecessor: Francisco F. Claver, S.J.
- Successor: Rodolfo Fontiveros Beltran

Orders
- Ordination: December 26, 1966
- Consecration: July 14, 2004 by Antonio Franco

Personal details
- Born: May 26, 1942 Sabangan, Mountain Province, Philippines
- Died: May 16, 2005 (aged 62)
- Denomination: Roman Catholic
- Motto: Pastor et Agnus "Shepherd and Lamb"
- Coat of arms

Cornelio Galleo Wigwigan (May 26, 1942 – May 16, 2005) was a Filipino bishop of the Catholic Church who served as the third Vicar Apostolic of the Apostolic Vicariate of Bontoc-Lagawe in the Philippines from 2004 to 2005.

== Early life and education ==
Wigwigan was born on May 26, 1942, in Sabangan, Mountain Province. He entered St. Francis Xavier Minor Seminary in Baguio and finished high school at St. Louis Boys’ High in 1959. He then entered San Carlos Seminary where he studied Philosophy and Theology. He pursued further studies at the East Asian Pastoral Institute in Quezon City from 1971 to 1972.

== Priesthood ==
He was ordained priest on December 26, 1966. He began his ministry as assistant pastor at the Pudtol Catholic Mission in Kalinga-Apayao from 1967 to 1968. From 1969 to 1971, he served as rector of the Catholic Mission in Flora, Kalinga-Apayao. He was assistant pastor at St. Vincent's Church in Baguio City, from 1972 to 1973, then rector of St. Francis Xavier Seminary from 1974 to 1976.

From 1976 to 1982, he was director of the Catechetical Center at the Bishop's House in Baguio, and from 1982 to 1985, he served as superintendent of Vicariate schools. He was vicar general of the Apostolic Vicariate of Montañosa from 1985 to 1987, while also serving as rector of Immaculate Conception Church and treasurer of the Vicariate until 1990. He resumed as rector of St. Francis Xavier Seminary from 1988 to 1990, then served in Sta. Rita Catholic Mission in Bontoc from 1991 to 1993, and St. Mary Magdalene Catholic Mission in Lagawe, Ifugao from 1994 to 1997. He returned as rector of Sta. Rita Cathedral in Bontoc from 1997 to 2004. He concurrently served as vicar general of the Vicariate (1997-2004) and director of St. Peter Seminary (2000-2004).

== Episcopal ministry ==
On April 15, 2004, Pope John Paul II appointed Wigwigan as Vicar Apostolic of Bontoc-Lagawe succeeding Bishop Francisco F. Claver, S.J. and assigned him the titular see of Vagrauta. He was consecrated and installed on July 14, 2004, at Sta. Rita Cathedral in Bontoc by Archbishop Antonio Franco. He served the Vicariate until his death on May 15, 2005.

Catholic Church titles
Preceded by Francisco F. Claver	Vicar Apostolic of Bontoc-Lagawe; 2004–2005	Succeeded by Rodolfo Fontiveros Beltran
Preceded by George Leo Thomas	Titular Bishop of Vagrauta; 2004–2005	Succeeded by Juan Frausto Pallares
