= DXDB-AM =

Philippine radio station

Radyo Bandilyo (DXDB)
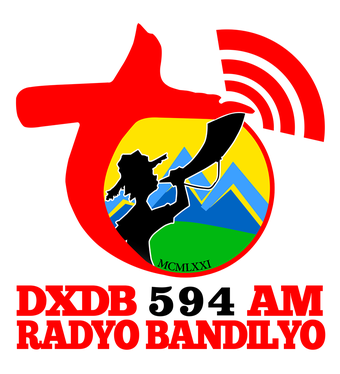
- Malaybalay; Philippines
- Broadcast area: Bukidnon and surrounding areas
- Frequency: 594 kHz
- Branding: DXDB 594 Radyo Bandilyo

Programming
- Languages: Cebuano, Filipino, English
- Format: Religious Radio
- Affiliations: Catholic Media Network

Ownership
- Owner: Roman Catholic Diocese of Malaybalay; (Catholic Bishops' Conference of the Philippines)

History
- First air date: As DXBB: May 26, 1971 (test broadcast); July 1, 1971 (experimental broadcast); September 11, 1971 (regular broadcast); As DXDB: March 22, 1991 (test broadcast); July 15, 1991 (regular broadcast)
- Former call signs: DXBB-AM (1971–1976)
- Former frequencies: 540 kHz (1971–1976)
- Call sign meaning: Dan-ag sa Bukidnon

Technical information
- Licensing authority: NTC
- Power: 5,000 watts

DXDB (594 AM) Radyo Bandilyo is a radio station owned and operated by the Roman Catholic Diocese of Malaybalay. The station's main studio is located at the Ground Floor, Communications Media Center Bldg., San Isidro Cathedral, Murillo St. cor. San Isidro St., Brgy. 6, Malaybalay; its alternate studio is located at the Ground Floor, San Agustin Parish Church, Sayre Highway, Valencia; and its transmitter is located at Brgy. Kalasungay, Malaybalay.

== History ==
=== 1969-1976: DXBB ===
DXDB traces its origins to its forerunner DXBB. The Confraternity of Christian Doctrine of the Archdiocese of Cagayan de Oro, where Bukidnon was under its ecclesiastical jurisdiction until 1969, had planned to put up a radio station for the purpose of teaching of Catholicism in the province.

Despite a failed appeal for a grant, the CCD's Communications Media Center of the newly created Prelature of Malaybalay realized the plan. After a series of test (began May 26, 1971) and later, experimental (began July 1) broadcasts, DXBB, located at Malaybalay and operating at 540 kHz with the power of 2.5 kW, under Bukidnon Broadcasting Corporation, eventually began its full-time broadcasting on September 11. Under the helm of CMC director Fr. Joseph Stoffel and prelate Bishop Francisco Claver, it became the province's pioneer radio station; and tagged as "Bandilyo sa Bukidnon" (town crier), it quickly became the most listened. However, upon declaration of nationwide martial law on September 21, 1972, President Ferdinand Marcos ordered the takeover and control of all mass media.

By that time, DXBB aired educational programs by the peasant organization Federation of Free Farmers, incurring annoyance by the local civil government, aside from that by the local military authorities. DXBB though obtained the permit from the government and resumed broadcasting on February 9, 1973; its licensee since then was the Catholic Welfare Organization. (Note: Although Catholic Welfare Organization was renamed Catholic Bishops' Conference of the Philippines in 1968, as indicated by a 1992 law on extension of its broadcast franchise, the congressional franchise name was only changed by the National Telecommunications Commission in 2002. Therefore, then CWO was recorded as the licensee of DXBB and present-day DXDB, currently under now CBCP.) DXBB was able to operate through financial aids.

On November 18, 1976, DXBB was raided and shut down by the military. Its closure, along with another Catholic radio station DXCD of the then Prelature of Tagum, Davao del Norte, was due to allegations that these were used by the Communist Party of the Philippines for ideological training purposes and broadcast coded messages to the New People's Army rebels. The military later admitted that charges of rebellion against these stations were baseless.

=== 1991-present: DXDB ===
Efforts on reviving the station began after the EDSA People Power Revolution. Through then Bishop Gaudencio Rosales (current Cardinal and Archbishop Emeritus of the Roman Catholic Archdiocese of Manila), as well as Misereor, a German foundation, and Bethlehemite Mission from Switzerland, DXBB was reopened 1991, this time as DXDB (carrying since then the branding "Dan-ag sa Bukidnon"; Light of Bukidnon), with its test broadcast since March 22. On July 15, DXDB eventually started its regular broadcast at 594 kHz.

By mid-1990s, the station increased its power to 10 kW, but was later reverted to the originally National Telecommunications Commission-authorized and present-day 5 kW.

On January 10, 2003, DXDB was officially registered to Securities and Exchange Commission under the name Catholic Radio Station DXDB-AM of Malaybalay, Inc.
