= Juan Frausto Pallares =

Mexican Roman Catholic prelate (1941–2026)

- Auxiliary Bishop Emeritus of León
- Archdiocese: León
- Appointed: 10 December 2005
- Term ended: 28 October 2016
- Other post: Titular Bishop of Vagrauta (2005–2026)

Orders
- Ordination: 21 June 1968
- Consecration: 24 February 2006 by José Guadalupe Martín Rábago, Giuseppe Bertello and Renato Ascencio León

Personal details
- Born: 10 July 1941 Tomelópez, Guanajuato, Mexico
- Died: 2 July 2026 (aged 84) León, Guanajuato, Mexico

Juan Frausto Pallares (10 July 1941 – 2 July 2026) was a Mexican Roman Catholic prelate. He served as auxiliary bishop of the Roman Catholic Archdiocese of León from 2005 to 2016.

Frausto Pallares was born in Tomelópez, Guanajuato on 10 July 1941. He died on 2 July 2026, at the age of 84.

Catholic Church titles
Preceded by —	Auxiliary Bishop of León; 2005–2016	Succeeded by —
Preceded by Cornelio Wigwigan	Titular Bishop of Vagrauta; 2005–2026	Succeeded by Vacant
