= Our Lady of the Atonement =

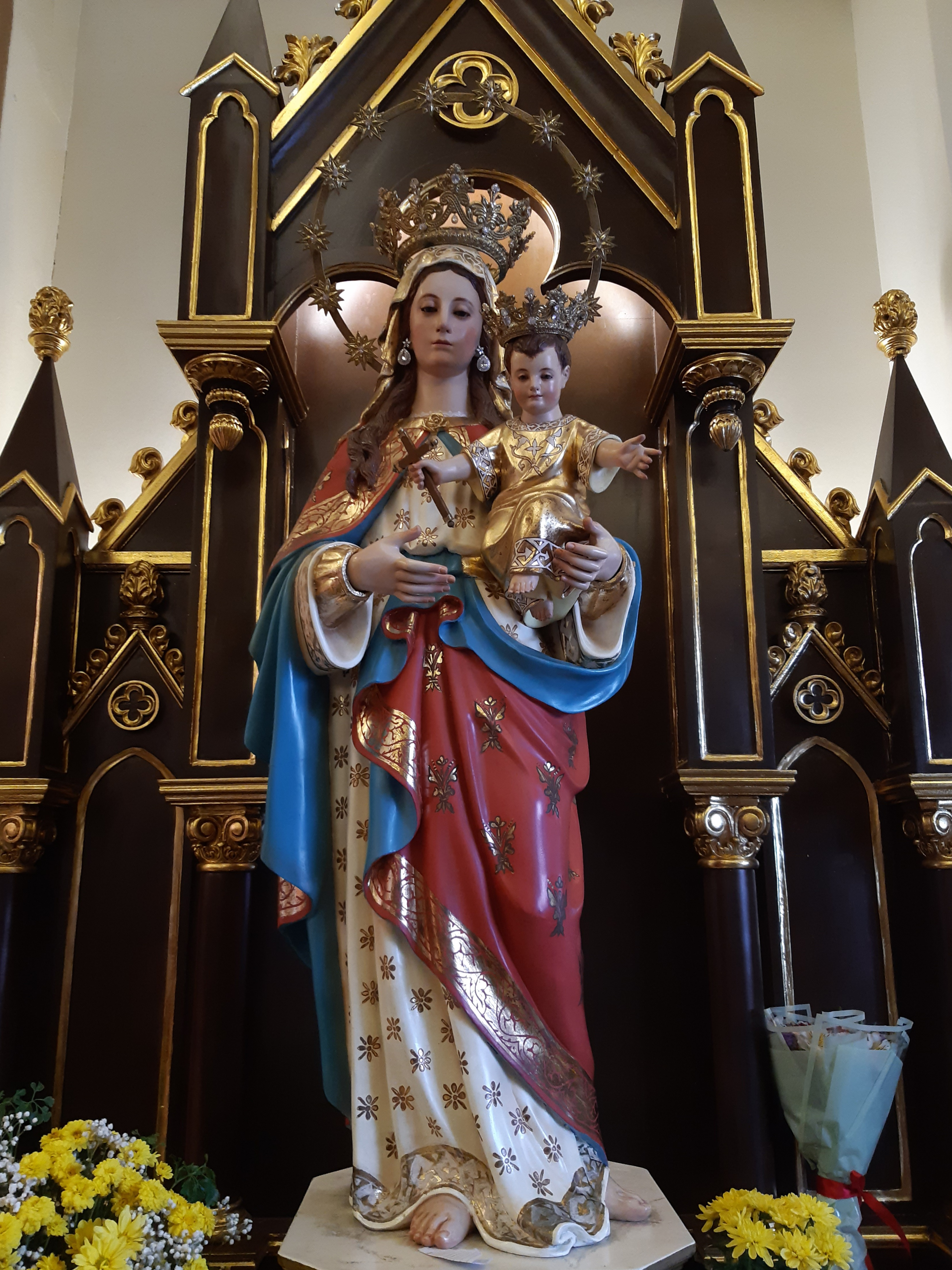
- The episcopally crowned image of Our Lady of the Atonement, Baguio Cathedral, Philippines
- Location: Philippines
- Patronage: Society of the Atonement
- Attributes: red cloak over a blue tunic

Our Lady of the Atonement (Latin: Domina Nostra Adunationis) is a title of the Blessed Virgin Mary first invoked by Father Paul Louis T. Wattson, S.A. and Mother Lurana White, S.A, the founders of the Society of the Atonement.

The feast day of Our Lady of the Atonement is July 9, and is observed as an optional memorial in the Personal Ordinariate of the Chair of Saint Peter in the United States.

== History ==
In June 1899, Episcopal priest Rev. Lewis T. Wattson professed his vows as a Friar of the Atonement, taking the name Paul James Francis. In 1901, Fr. Paul initiated for his Friars of the Atonement devotion to the Blessed Mother invoked under the title, “Our Lady of the Atonement”, adapting prayers to Our Lady of Sorrows. That same year, he and Society of Atonement co-founder, Mother Lurana White, established the Rosary League of Our Lady of the Atonement. In the early 1900s, Wattson was a popular preacher in Episcopal churches, and Mother Lurana edited a small magazine called Rose Leaves from Our Lady’s Garden at Graymoor. This brought a greater awareness of the devotion to the Episcopalian community. The title became popular common among Anglicans and Anglo-Catholics who have a similar devotion in their liturgical traditions. In 1909, the Society of the Atonement entered into communion with the Catholic Church.

In 1919, the title was formally approved by Pope Benedict XV. In the September 1932 issue of The Lamp, Father Paul wrote, "When we, therefore, give to our Blessed Mother the title of 'Our Lady of the Atonement', we mean 'Our Lady of Unity.'"

Her image was painted by Giovanni Martini in 1929, and by Mother Margaret Mary Nealis in 1933. Stained glass windows at the St. Francis Chapel at Graymoor also depict Our Lady of the Atonement. The Franciscan Sisters of the Atonement have a shrine to Our Lady of the Atonement near the entrance to Graymoor. The feast day of Our Lady of the Atonement, July 9, was approved by the Holy See in 1946.

== Description of the Image ==
Our Lady of the Atonement is depicted wearing a golden crown or a crown of 12 stars and a blue tunic. The red mantle signifies the Precious Blood of Jesus. She holds in her arms the Christ Child who holds a cross in his right hand.

== Legacy ==
The Cathedral of Our Lady of the Atonement in Baguio, Philippines is named in honour of this devotion. Begun by CICM Missionaries and consecrated in 1936, the Cathedral survived the Allied carpet bombing of the city towards the end of the Second World War. It is the see of the Bishop of Baguio.

In 1983, Our Lady of the Atonement Catholic Church in San Antonio, Texas was founded as an Anglican Use parish in the Roman Catholic Archdiocese of San Antonio, under the 1980 Pastoral Provision of Pope John Paul II. The Pastoral Provision authorizes establishment of personal parishes in dioceses of the United States for Episcopalian converts who had entered into full communion with the Catholic Church, but wished to preserve liturgical aspects of Anglican worship. In March 2017, the parish became part of the Personal Ordinariate of the Chair of Saint Peter. Atonement Academy was its parochial school.

An image of Our Lady of the Atonement enshrined at the Baguio Cathedral was episcopally crowned on 25 March 2023 by the Bishop of Baguio.
