= Isaac Claver =

Spanish politician (born 1989)

President of the Provincial Deputation of Huesca
- Incumbent
- Assumed office 30 June 2023
- Preceded by: Miguel Gracia Ferrer

Personal details
- Born: 8 February 1989 (age 37)
- Party: People's Party

Isaac Claver Ortigosa (born 8 February 1989) is a Spanish politician serving as president of the provincial deputation of Huesca since 2023. He has served as mayor of Monzón since 2019.
