= Malasiqui =

Municipality in Pangasinan, Philippines

- Municipality
- Municipality of Malasiqui
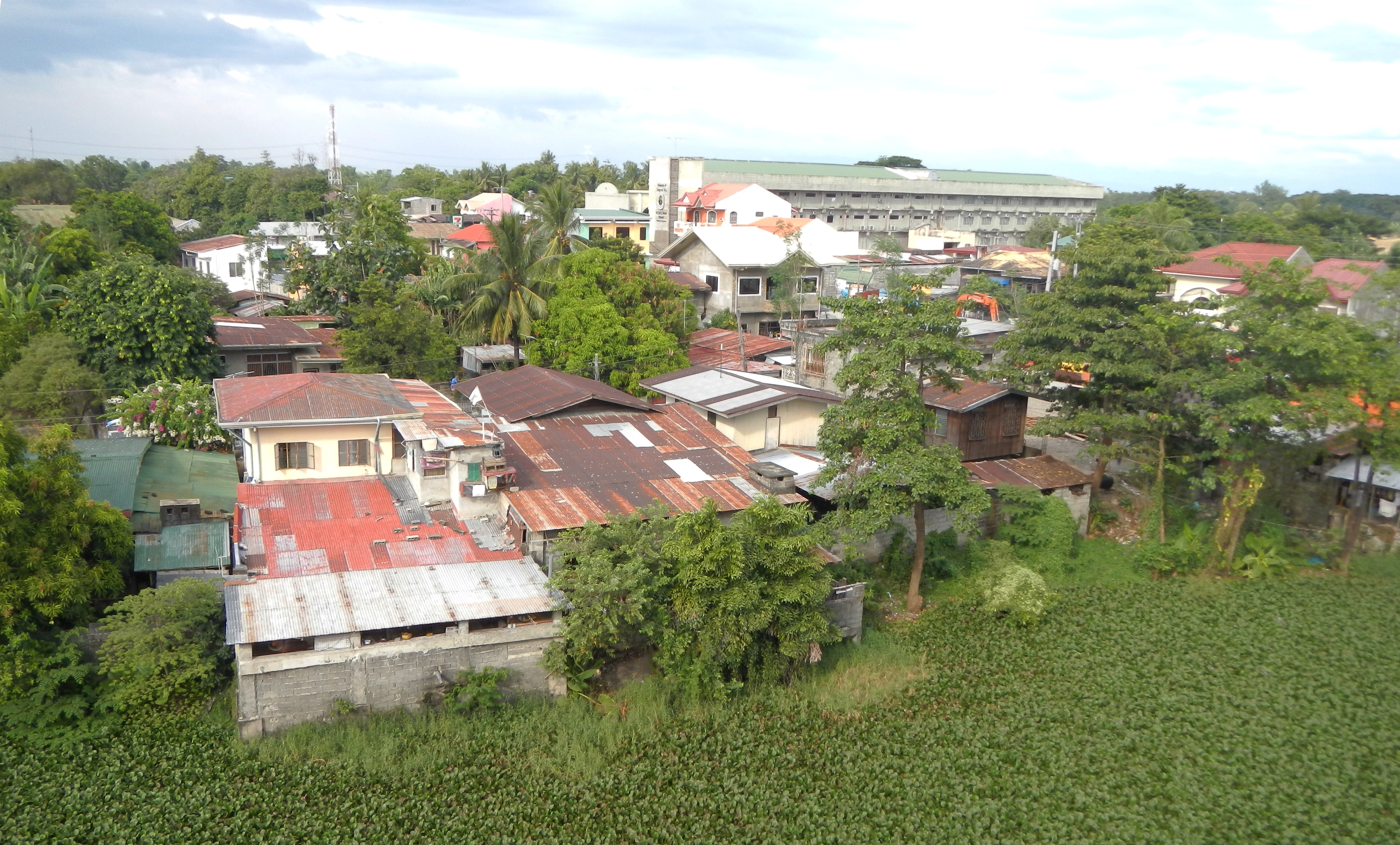
- Panoramic

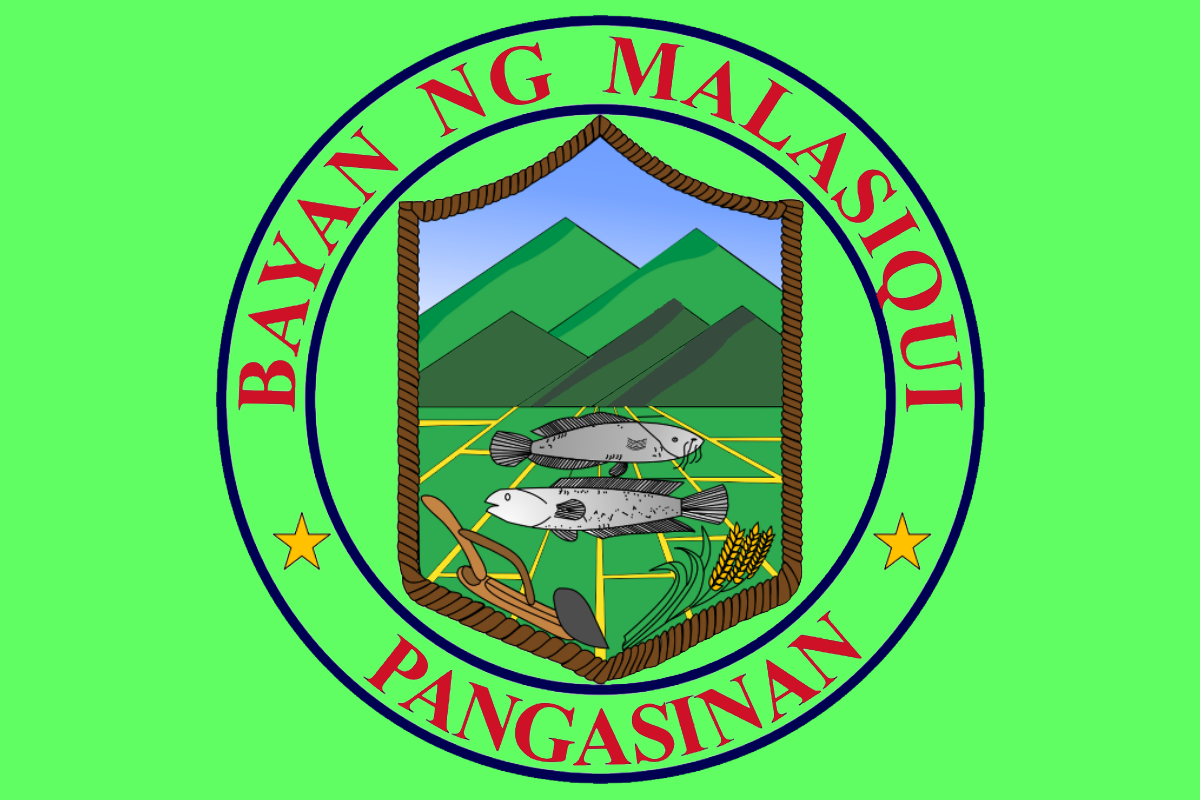
- Flag Seal

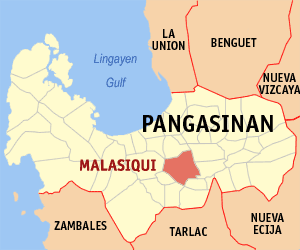
- Map of Pangasinan with Malasiqui highlighted
- Interactive map of Malasiqui
- Location within the Philippines
- Coordinates: 15°55′N 120°25′E
- Country: Philippines
- Region: Ilocos Region
- Province: Pangasinan
- District: 3rd district
- Founded: January 22, 1671 (355 years ago)
- Barangays: 73 (see Barangays)

Government
  - Type: Sangguniang Bayan
  - Mayor: Alfe M. Soriano
  - Vice Mayor: Daria Dolores M. Mamaril
  - Representative: Maria Rachel J. Arenas
  - Municipal Council: Members: Vincent Nathaniel S. Arenas; Norman S. Espinoza; Jessica V. Gueco; Alexis V. Mamaril; Janice D. Pinlac; Ronorick D. Ballesteros; John Phillip A. Domantay; Brian Dave R. Austria
  - Electorate: 89,906 voters (2025)

Area
  - Total: 131.37 km^{2} (50.72 sq mi)
- Elevation: 21 m (69 ft)
- Highest elevation: 87 m (285 ft)
- Lowest elevation: 5 m (16 ft)

Population (2024 census)
  - Total: 144,344
  - Density: 1,098.8/km^{2} (2,845.8/sq mi)
  - Households: 34,428

Economy
  - Income class: 1st municipal income class
  - Poverty incidence: 13.57% (2023)
  - Revenue: ₱ 509.3 million (2024)
  - Assets: ₱ 1,141 million (2024)
  - Expenditure: ₱ 462 million (2024)
  - Liabilities: ₱ 327.5 million (2024)

Service provider
  - Electricity: Central Pangasinan Electric Cooperative (CENPELCO)
- Time zone: UTC+8 (PST)
- ZIP code: 2421
- PSGC: 0105524000
- IDD : area code: +63 (0)75
- Native languages: Pangasinan; Ilocano; Tagalog
- Website: malasiqui.gov.ph

Malasiqui, officially the Municipality of Malasiqui (Pangasinan: Baley na Malasiqui; Ilocano: Ili ti Malasiqui; Tagalog: Bayan ng Malasiqui), is a municipality in the province of Pangasinan, Philippines. According to the 2024 census, it has a population of 144,344 people.

== Etymology ==
The word Malasiqui originates from the Pangasinense root word lasi meaning lightning. With prefix ma indicating high degree and suffix qui indicating place - Malasiqui means "place full of lightning".

Another story about the town's etymology goes to talk about three Spanish priests who, while conducting ocular during those days, were so pissed off with the condition of the road which was muddy. The first priest said "mala" which means bad. The second priest responded "si" which means yes. The third one apparently not paying attention asked "que?" or "what". The local folk who overheard the conversation mistook it as if they are naming the town. And so it came to be known as Mala Si Que? or the current name spelled as Malasiqui.

== History ==
The socio-political history of the municipality parallels that of the Pangasinan province and the country in general. Its history is punctuated by periods of foreign domination first by the Spanish, then by the United States and briefly by the Japanese during the 2nd World War.

There were no organized communities in the area before the Spaniards arrived. Attempts to group families into a settlement may have started as early as 1665. The present site was then heavily forested with small family groups scattered along banks of small rivers and creeks.

The municipality proper traces its origins during the middle of the 17th century when Spanish friars opened a mission intended to convert the native population into Catholicism. The most probable founding year was 1671 when Spanish civil authorities in Manila gave the license for the creation of the town. The population participated heavily in some of the bloodiest rebellions during the Spanish period. Catholicism and other Christian sects dominate the religious life of the people.

Ethnically, it is one of the few places in the province of Pangasinan which did not experience in-migration from other regions of the country. Consequently, Pangasinanse is the dominant ethnic group with almost no other ethnic groups mixing into the locality.

Today, the poblacion or town center, has recently been experiencing high commercial growth spurred mainly by high consumer spending generated by increase in family incomes attributable to earnings of OFWs (Overseas Filipino Workers). The estimate of OFW population as a percentage of adult labor force is as much as 22% - one of the highest rates in the Philippines. The OFW phenomenon is so significant that almost all households have at least one member working outside of the country.

== Geography ==
Malasiqui is situated 27.97 kilometres (17.38 mi) from the provincial capital Lingayen, and 195.76 kilometres (121.64 mi) from the country's capital city of Manila.

=== Barangays ===
Malasiqui is politically subdivided into 73 barangays. Each barangay consists of puroks and some have sitios.

- Abonagan
- Agdao
- Alacan
- Aliaga
- Amacalan
- Anolid
- Apaya
- Asin Este
- Asin Weste
- Bacundao Este
- Bacundao Weste
- Bakitiw
- Balite
- Banawang
- Barang
- Bawer
- Binalay
- Bobon
- Bolaoit
- Bongar
- Butao
- Cabatling
- Cabueldatan
- Calbueg
- Canan Norte
- Canan Sur
- Cawayan Bogtong
- Don Pedro
- Gatang
- Goliman
- Gomez
- Guilig
- Ican
- Ingalagala
- Lareg-lareg
- Lasip
- Lepa
- Loqueb Este
- Loqueb Norte
- Loqueb Sur
- Lunec
- Mabulitec
- Malimpec
- Manggan-Dampay
- Nancapian
- Nalsian Norte
- Nalsian Sur
- Nansangaan
- Olea
- Pacuan
- Palapar Norte
- Palapar Sur
- Palong
- Pamaranum
- Pasima
- Payar
- Poblacion
- Polong Norte
- Polong Sur
- Potiocan
- San Julian
- Tabo-Sili
- Tobor
- Talospatang
- Taloy
- Taloyan
- Tambac
- Tolonguat
- Tomling
- Umando
- Viado
- Waig
- Warey

=== Climate ===
Climate data for Malasiqui, Pangasinan
Month	Jan	Feb	Mar	Apr	May	Jun	Jul	Aug	Sep	Oct	Nov	Dec	Year
Mean daily maximum °C (°F)	31 (88)	31 (88)	31 (88)	33 (91)	32 (90)	32 (90)	30 (86)	30 (86)	30 (86)	31 (88)	31 (88)	31 (88)	31 (88)
Mean daily minimum °C (°F)	21 (70)	21 (70)	22 (72)	24 (75)	24 (75)	24 (75)	23 (73)	23 (73)	23 (73)	23 (73)	23 (73)	22 (72)	23 (73)
Average precipitation mm (inches)	5.1 (0.20)	11.6 (0.46)	21.1 (0.83)	27.7 (1.09)	232.9 (9.17)	350.8 (13.81)	679.8 (26.76)	733.1 (28.86)	505 (19.9)	176.6 (6.95)	67.2 (2.65)	17.7 (0.70)	2,828.6 (111.38)
Average rainy days	3	3	3	4	14	18	23	25	22	15	8	4	142
Source: World Weather Online (modeled/calculated data, not measured locally)

== Demographics ==
Population census of Malasiqui

Year	Pop.	±% p.a.
1903	14,550	—
1918	22,747	+3.02%
1939	33,660	+1.88%
1948	40,786	+2.16%
1960	50,730	+1.83%
1970	61,423	+1.93%

Year	Pop.	±% p.a.
1975	67,489	+1.91%
1980	70,905	+0.99%
1990	92,053	+2.65%
1995	101,056	+1.76%
2000	113,190	+2.46%
2007	122,820	+1.13%

Year	Pop.	±% p.a.
2010	123,566	+0.22%
2015	130,275	+1.01%
2020	143,094	+2.00%
2024	144,344	+0.21%

Source: Philippine Statistics Authority

== Economy ==
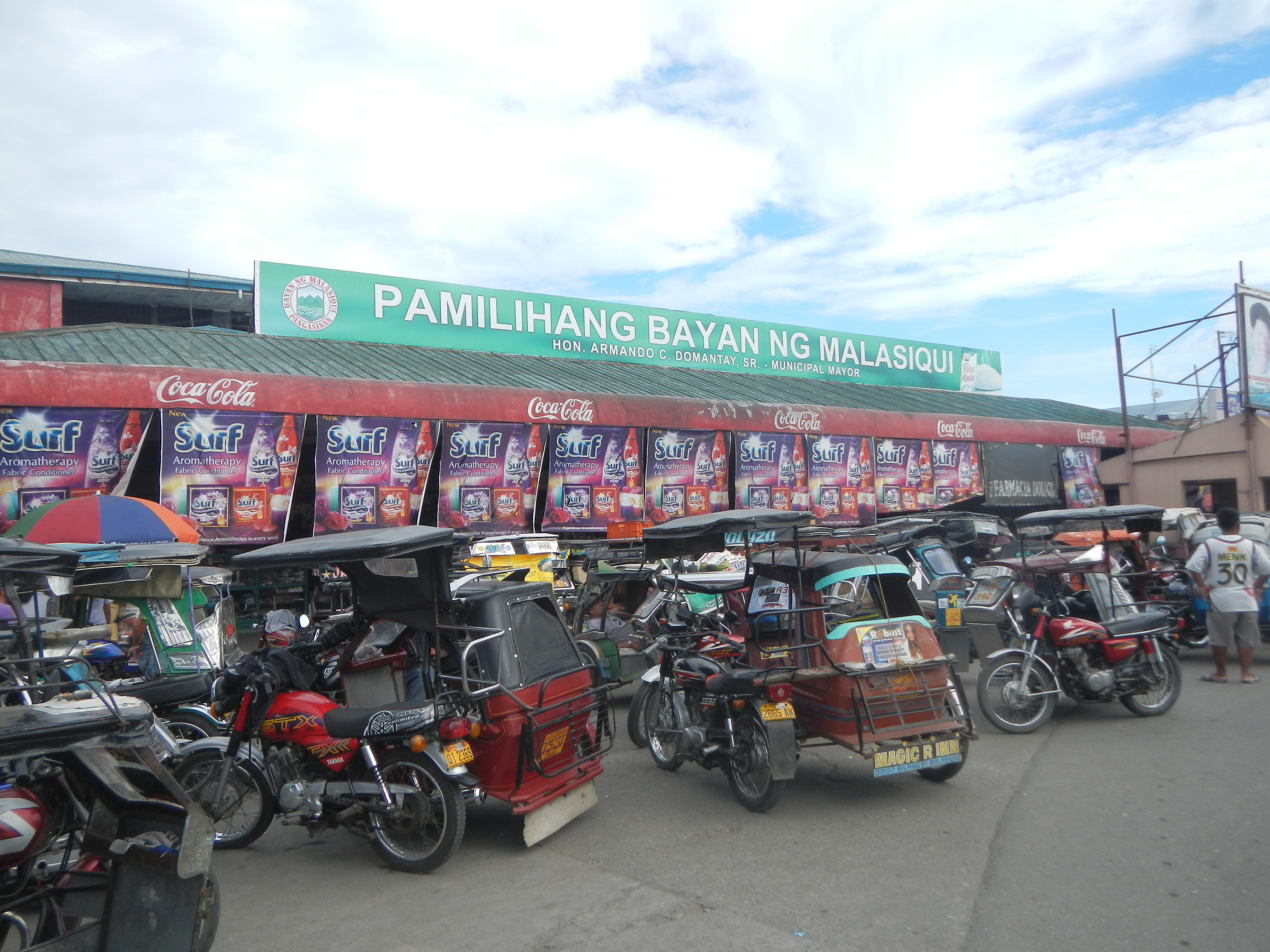
Public Market

Poverty incidence of Malasiqui (%)

Source: Philippine Statistics Authority

It is mainly an agricultural municipality with rice, corn and tropical lowland vegetables as main crops. It is also famous for its mango fruits having one of the largest concentration of mango tree population in the Philippines.

== Government ==
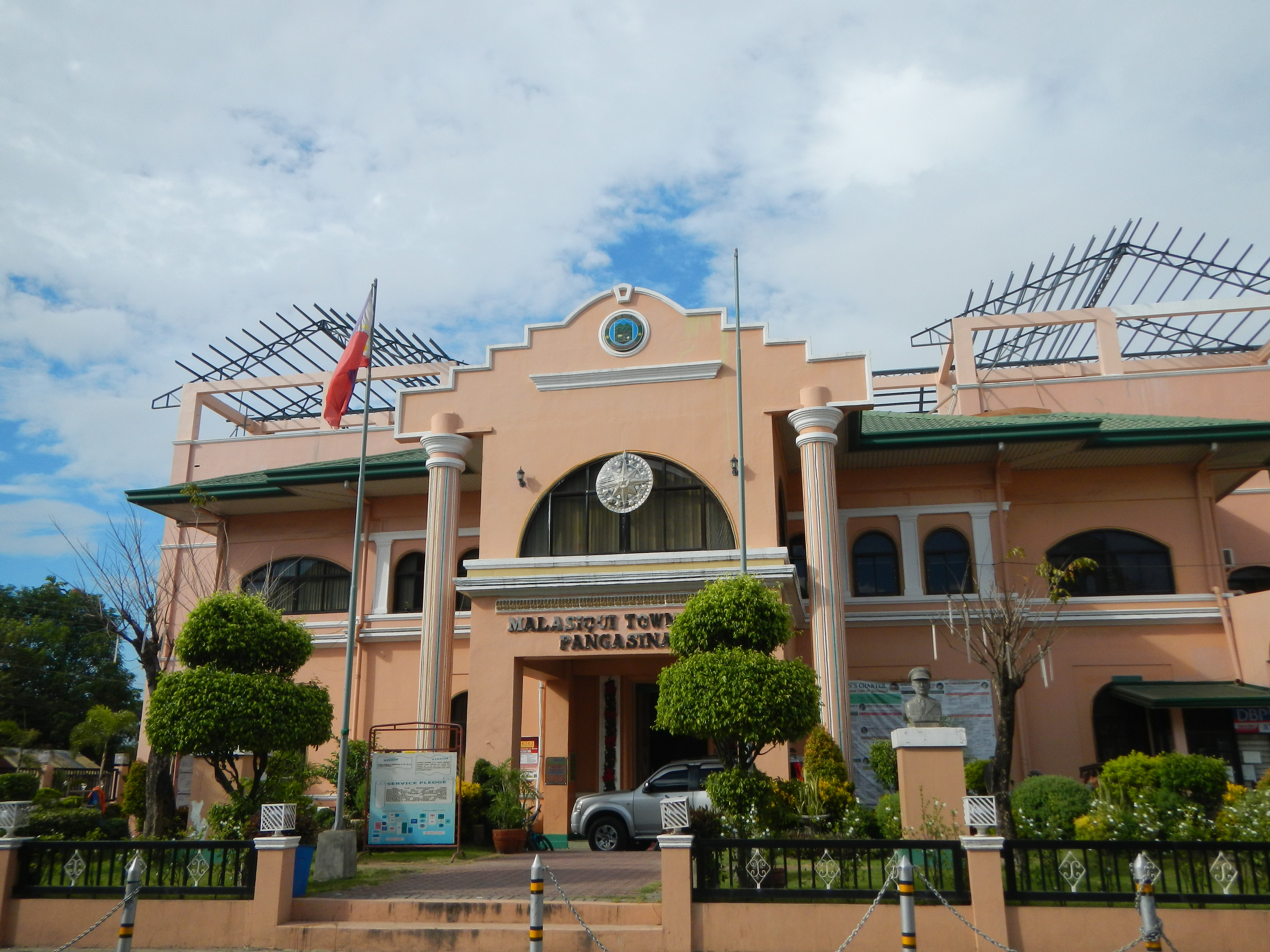
Town hall

=== Local government ===
Malasiqui, belonging to the third congressional district of the province of Pangasinan, is governed by a mayor designated as its local chief executive and by a municipal council as its legislative body in accordance with the Local Government Code. The mayor, vice mayor, and the councilors are elected directly by the people through an election which is being held every three years.

Elected officials of the Municipal Council (2025–2028):

- Congressman: Maria Rachel J. Arenas
- Mayor: Alfe M. Soriano
- Vice-Mayor: Daria Dolores M. Mamaril
- Councilors:
  - Vincent Nathaniel S. Arenas
  - Norman S. Espinoza
  - Jessica V. Gueco
  - Alexis V. Mamaril
  - Janice D. Pinlac
  - Ronorick D. Ballesteros
  - John Phillip A. Domantay
  - Brian Dave R. Austria

== Tourism ==
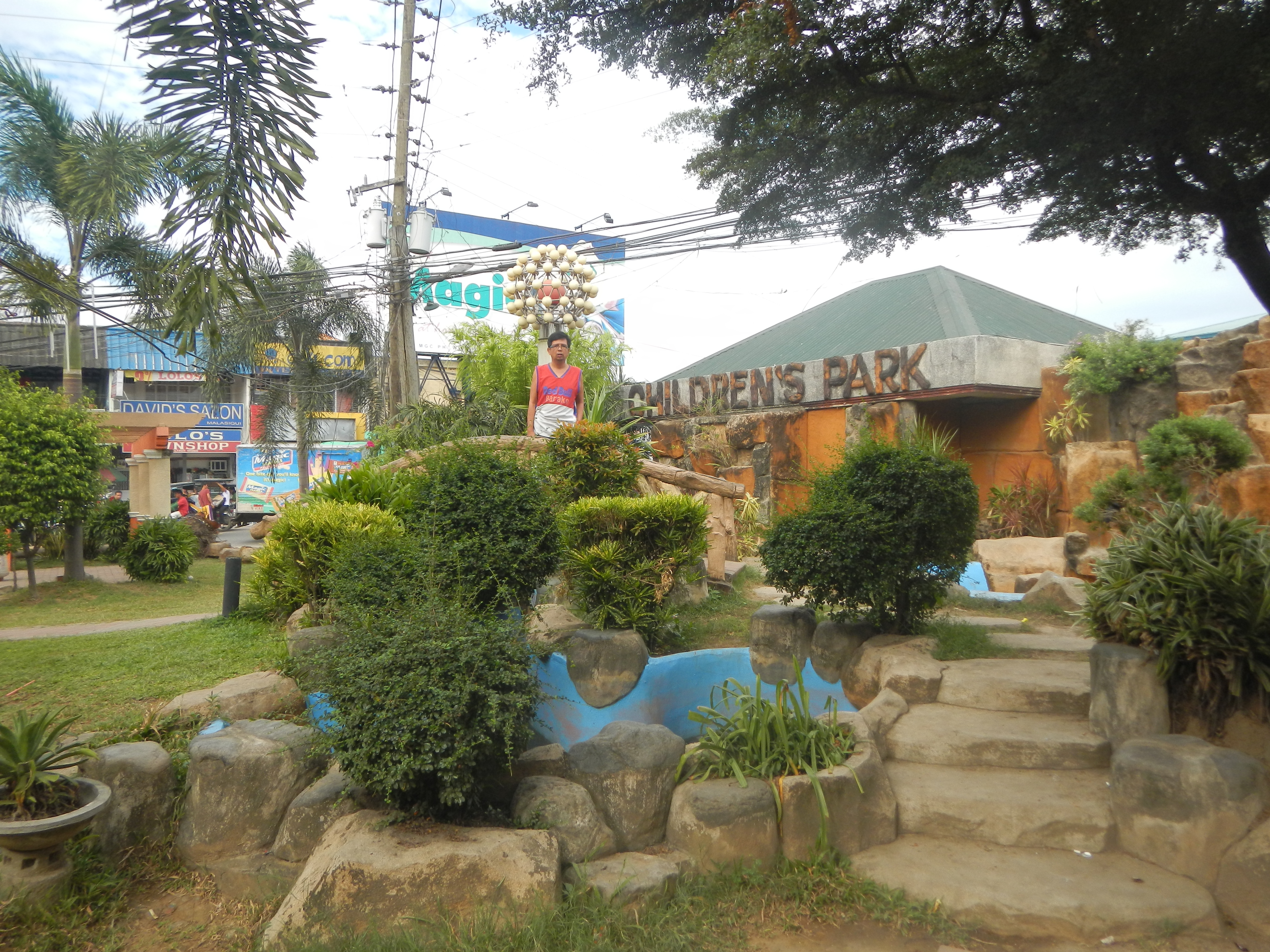
Public Park and Plaza

The Town Fiesta is celebrated January 17 thru 22 every year. Points of interests include:

- Malasiqui Agno Valley College
- Perpetual Help College of Pangasinan
- Harvest Festival
- Assembly of God
- Rep. Rachel "Baby" Arenas farm
- Monastery of the Poor Clares of St. James the Apostle
- Archdiocese of Lingayen-Dagupan's first cloistered monastery
- Malasiqui Central School
- Centeno Farm Resort and Ecohills Resort
- Barangay Lareg-Lareg and the Arenas Civic Center
- Magic Mall
- St. Ildephonse of Seville Parish Church (Malasiqui)

== Education ==
There are two schools district offices which govern all educational institutions within the municipality. The schools district offices oversee the management and operations of all private and public elementary and high schools. These are Malasiqui I Schools District Office, and Malasiqui II Schools District Office.

=== Primary and elementary schools ===
- Abonagan - Bobon Elementary School
- Alacan-Guilig Elementary School
- Aliaga Elementary School
- Apaya Elementary School
- Asin Este Elementary School
- Bacundao East Elementary School
- Bacundao Elementary School
- Bakitiw Elementary School
- Balite Elementary School
- Barang Elementary School
- Bernabe Q. Jimenez E/S
- Biba Elementary School
- Binalay Elementary School
- Bogtong Elementary School
- Bolaoit Elementary School
- Bongar Elementary School
- Cabatling Elementary School
- Cabeldatan Elementary School
- Calbeg Elementary School
- Canan Elementary School
- Don Pedro Elementary School
- Gatang Elementary School
- Genaro Armas Elementary School
- Goliman Elementary School
- Hemmingford Academy of Malasiqui
- Iba Elementary School
- Ican Elementary School
- J.C. Macaranas Elementary School
- Jorge C. De Vera Elementary School
- Lepa Elementary School
- Lokeb Este Elementary School
- Lokeb Norte Elementary School
- Lokeb Sur Elementary School
- Lunec Elementary School
- Malasiqui Adventist School
- Malasiqui Catholic School
- Malasiqui I Central School
- Malimpec Elementary School
- Mangan Dampay Elementary School
- Marian Educational Center of Malasiqui
- Mendoza Memorial Elementary School
- Nalsian-Tomling Elementary School
- Olea Elementary School
- Pacuan Elementary School
- Palapar Elementary School
- Palapar Norte Elementary School
- Palong Elementary School
- Pamaranum Elementary School
- Pasima Elementary School
- Payar-Gomez Elementary School
- Polong Elementary School
- Potiocan Elementary School
- San Julian Central School
- Seed School of San Francisco
- Tabo-Sili Elementary School
- Talospatang Elementary School
- Tobor Elementary School
- Tolonguat Elementary School

=== Secondary schools ===
- Aliaga National High School
- Calbeg National High School
- CananNational High School
- Catalino D. Cerezo National High School
- Clemente Cristobal National High School
- Domingo P. Boquiren National High School
- Don Pedro National High School
- Lareglareg National High School
- Lokeb Norte National High School
- Lokeb Sur National High School
- Lunec National High School
- Mabulitec Integrated School
- Malasiqui National High School
- Nalsian-Tomling National High School
- Nancapian National High School
- Olea National High School
- Palapar National High School
- Talospatang National High School
- Tobor National High School
- San Julian National High School

=== Higher educational institutions ===
- Malasiqui Agno Valley College
- Perpetual Help College of Pangasinan
