= Rodolfo Fontiveros Beltran =

Filipino Roman Catholic bishop

Most Reverend Rodolfo F. Beltran OP
- Bishop of San Fernando de La Union
- Diocese: Diocese of San Fernando de La Union
- See: San Fernando de La Union
- Predecessor: Daniel Presto
- Successor: Artemio Rillera
- Previous posts: Vicar Apostolic of Bontoc-Lagawe & Titular Bishop of Buffada

Orders
- Ordination: 25 March 1976
- Consecration: 16 May 2006

Personal details
- Born: Rodolfo Fontiveros Beltran; 13 November 1948
- Died: 17 June 2017 (aged 68)
- Denomination: Roman Catholic
- Motto: 'Ad Omnes Frater'
- Coat of arms

Rodolfo Fontiveros Beltran (1948- 2017) was a Filipino prelate of the Catholic Church and a professed member of the Dominican Order, who became a bishop of San Fernando de La Union on 30 October 2012 until his death on 17 June 2017. He had previously served as apostolic vicar of Bontoc-Lagawe from 2006 to 2012.

== Biography ==
Beltran was born in Gattaran in Cagayan Province. He was ordained as a deacon of the Archdiocese of Tuguegarao in 1974 and ordained to the priesthood in 1976 by the First Metropolitan Archbishop of Tuguegarao, Teodulfo S. Domingo. On 18 March 2006, on the eve of the Feast of Saint Joseph, he was appointed as Apostolic Vicar of Bontoc-Lagawe with the titular see of Buffada. He was consecrated by Diosdado A. Talamayan on 16 May 2006, and installed as the 4th vicar apostolic of Bontoc-Lagawe on 29 May 2006. Beltran was later appointed as Bishop of San Fernando de La Union on 30 October 2012. On 12 June 2015 he joined the Order of Preacher.
