= Carlito Joaquin Cenzon =

Filipino Roman Catholic bishop (1939–2019)

His Excellency, The Most Reverend Carlito J. Cenzon CICM
- Bishop of Baguio
- Church: Catholic Church
- Diocese: Diocese of Baguio
- Installed: January 25, 2002
- Retired: October 1, 2016
- Predecessor: Ernesto Salgado
- Successor: Victor Bendico
- Previous posts: Titular Bishop of Scebatiana (1992-2004); Vicar Apostolic of Tabuk (1992-2002)

Orders
- Ordination: 9 June 1965
- Consecration: 25 November 1992 by Gian Vincenzo Moreni

Personal details
- Born: 25 January 1939 Baguio, Mountain Province, Commonwealth of the Philippines
- Died: 26 June 2019 (aged 80) Quezon City, Philippines

Carlito Joaquin Cenzon (25 January 1939 – 26 June 2019) was a Filipino Roman Catholic bishop.

Cenzon was born in the Philippines and was ordained to the priesthood in 1965. He served as titular bishop of Scebatiana and as bishop of the Apostolic Vicariate of Tabuk, Philippines, from 1992 to 2002. Cenzon served as vicar apostolic of the Baguio, Philippines, from 2002 to 2004. He was appointed the first bishop of the Diocese of Baguio in 2004 and served as bishop until 2016.
