= Apostolic Vicariate of Tabuk =

Catholic jurisdiction in the Philippines

Apostolic Vicariate of Tabuk Vicariatus Apostolicus Tabukensis Apostoliko Vicariato ti Tabuk

Catholic
- Coat of arms

Location
- Country: Philippines
- Territory: Kalinga and Apayao
- Ecclesiastical province: Immediately subject to the Holy See

Statistics
- Area: 6,471 km^{2} (2,498 sq mi)
- Population: Total; Catholics: (as of 2021); 499,800; 375,000 (75%)
- Parishes: 21

Information
- Denomination: Catholic Church
- Sui iuris church: Latin Church
- Rite: Roman Rite
- Established: 6 Jul 1992
- Cathedral: Cathedral of Saint William the Hermit
- Patron saint: William the Hermit
- Secular priests: 25

Current leadership
- Pope: Leo XIV
- Vicar Apostolic: Sean Buslig Mejia

The Apostolic Vicariate of Tabuk is a Latin Church ecclesiastical missionary jurisdiction or apostolic vicariate of the Catholic Church in the Philippines covering the provinces of Kalinga and Apayao in northern Luzon.

It is exempt (directly subject to the Holy See) and not part of any ecclesiastical province, yet for the purpose of apostolic cooperation usually grouped with the Archdiocese of Tuguegarao. It also has a working partnership with the Apostolic Vicariate of Bontoc-Lagawe and the Diocese of Baguio, both in the Cordilleras, to coordinate Catholic missions among the Igorot tribes.

Its cathedral is the Saint William's Cathedral, in Tabuk, Kalinga. Pope Leo XIV appointed diocesan administrator Fr. Sean B. Mejia as its Apostolic Vicar on March 3, 2026, succeeding Prudencio Andaya Jr., who became Bishop of Cabanatuan.

== History ==
Established on 6 July 1992 as Apostolic Vicariate of Tabuk by Pope John Paul II with the Apostolic Constitution, Philippinarum Insularum fideles, on territory split off from the then Apostolic Vicariate of Mountain Provinces (now diocese of Baguio).

== List of apostolic vicars ==
No.	Name	From	Until	Coat of arms
1	Carlito Joaquin Cenzon, CICM (1939–2019)	6 Jul 1992	25 Jan 2002 (appointed Bishop of Baguio)	
2	Prudencio Padilla Andaya Jr., CICM (born 1959)	16 Apr 2003	8 Dec 2024 (appointed Bishop of Cabanatuan)	
3	Sean Buslig Mejia (born 1972)	3 Mar 2026		

== Sources and External links ==
- Bishop Prudencio Padilla Andaya Jr., C.I.C.M. Catholic-Hierarchy.org
- Claretian Publications; Apostolic Vicariate of Tabuk
- GCatholic, with incumbent biography links
