= Francisco Claver =

Filipino Jesuit (born 1926)

The Most Reverend Francisco F. Claver S.J., D.D.
- Vicar Apostolic of Bontoc-Lagawe
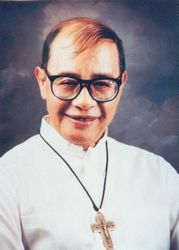
- See: Bontoc-Lagawe
- Installed: 2 November 1995
- Term ended: 15 April 2004
- Predecessor: Brigido A. Galasgas
- Successor: Cornelio G. Wigwigan
- Previous post: Bishop of Malaybalay

Orders
- Ordination: 18 June 1961
- Consecration: 22 August 1969 by Carmine Rocco

Personal details
- Born: Francisco Funaay Claver; January 20, 1929 Bontoc, Mountain Province, Philippine Islands
- Died: July 1, 2010 (aged 81)
- Buried: Jesuit Cemetery, Sacred Heart Novitiate, Novaliches, Quezon City, Philippines
- Denomination: Roman Catholicism
- Education: Loyola School of Theology, Woodstock College, University of Colorado
- Motto: Levavi ad oculi montes ("I lift my eyes to the mountains")
- Coat of arms

Francisco Funaay Claver, S.J. (20 January 1926 – 1 July 2010) was a Filipino Jesuit, cultural anthropologist and human rights activist.

As a Catholic prelate, he is renowned for his writings on ecclesiology and social justice, and his efforts to institutionalize Vatican II reforms in the Philippine Catholic Church. As a human rights activist, Claver was one of the most persistent critics of the Marcos dictatorship among Philippine Catholic Church leaders. Claver was at the forefront of civil society groups that opposed the Marcos regime's World Bank-funded Chico River Dam project, which would have caused the displacement of Indigenous peoples living in the area. He was also responsible for drafting the 1986 Philippine bishops' statement, which was considered a key moment in the People Power Revolution that overthrew the Marcos dictatorship. Claver is considered one of the "intellectual minds" in the ranks of the bishops of the Catholic Church in Asia.

== Biography ==
Claver was born in 1929 in Bontoc, the capital of the old Mountain Province during the American Occupation of the Philippines. It was only in the 1860s when the Spanish colonial government finally established political control of the largely unhispanized central Cordillera region of Northern Luzon. In Bontoc, efforts to spread Christianity did not last as Spanish Augustinians abandoned their mission in 1898. Catholicism started to take roots in the Cordillera with the arrival of Belgian missionaries at the start of the American colonial period. It was in this context that Claver's family became one of the first Catholic converts in Bontoc.

Claver received his early education in schools in Benguet and Kalinga. He entered the Society of Jesus on 30 May 1948 and received initial Jesuit formation in Novaliches and Cebu. He was sent for his theological studies to Woodstock College, Maryland, United States of America, where he was ordained to the priesthood on 18 June 1961. This makes Claver the first Roman Catholic priest ordained from the Indigenous Bontoc people of northern Luzon.

Claver began special studies in Anthropology and spent a year at the Ateneo de Manila University, and another two years doing research in mission parishes of Bukidnon. He established a new mission, the first among the Manobo people, and later finished his doctoral work at the University of Colorado in 1972.

In 1969, he was appointed bishop of Malaybalay in Bukidnon, a province in the southern island of Mindanao, where he served from 1969 to 1984. It was during his years as a pastor of Bukidnon until the People Power Revolution that Claver became involved in human rights activism against the abuses of the Marcos regime.

In 1995, Claver returned to his hometown of Bontoc where he served as the bishop of the Vicariate of Bontoc-Lagawe until 2004. Within the Catholic Bishops' Conference of the Philippines (CBCP), Claver served as chair of the Episcopal Commission for Indigenous Peoples, and of the Commission for Justice and Peace.

Claver died on 1 July 2010 while confined at the Cardinal Santos Memorial Hospital in San Juan City. Claver's remains were brought back to his hometown of Bontoc where a funeral was held for three days at the Santa Rita de Cascia Cathedral. The bishop was laid to rest at the Jesuit Cemetery in the Sacred Heart Novitiate, Novaliches district of Quezon City.

== Pastoral Ministry ==
In the spirit of the Second Vatican Council reforms, Claver's ecclesiology emphasized the importance of a participatory Church, one which puts more emphasis on the Church as a community rather the Church as a hierarchy. In 2009, Claver published his work The Making of a Local Church, where he stressed that the best way to renew faith life at all levels of the Catholic Church was to develop small, local communities that are responsive to local needs. Claver dedicated his numerous years as the bishop of Malaybalay (1969-1984) and Bontoc-Lagawe (1995-2004) to establishing Basic Ecclesial Communities (BECs), a model of a local church that actively engaged as many laypeople in the grassroots as possible. While his idea of joint pastoral responsibility between the clergy and the lay people caused discomfort among some conservative church leaders, Claver's church model won him the admiration of many Catholic church leaders and theologians within and outside of the Philippines, including leaders of some Protestant groups.

Claver also championed the indigenization movement within the Philippine Catholic Church. Indigenization involved teaching and expressing using the language and artistic and musical traditions found in the local culture. For example, Claver wanted the Manobos to get to know God by using Bibles translated in the Manobo language published by the researchers at the Summer Institute of Linguistics, a non-Catholic group.

== Human rights activism and opposition against the Marcos dictatorship ==
When President Marcos placed the Philippines under Martial Law in 1972, the Catholic Church hierarchy did not share a unified outlook towards martial law. The Catholic Bishops' Conference of the Philippines (CBCP) was dominated by a faction of conservative Catholic bishops, led by Archbishop Julio Rosales of Cebu, who believed that the Church should stay out of political matters and focus solely on religious and spiritual concerns. This group of about fifteen bishops were the most supportive of the Marcos governments's "reforms". Another group of Church leaders representing the moderate faction was led by Jaime Cardinal Sin of Manila. This group criticized specific injustices of the regime without attacking martial law in principle, a strategy they called "critical collaboration". A third group, representing the liberal front, protested martial law in principle and its wide array of abuses. This third group bishops who tended to be younger, located in smaller dioceses, and more committed to the social action goals of the church. Bishop Claver, who ironically hails from the pro-Marcos "Solid North" region of Northern Luzon, became the most prominent figure of this third group.

Claver's opposition against the Marcos dictatorship was closely intertwined with his theological views, which appears to have been largely inspired by liberation theology movement in the Catholic Church. In the 1970s, the movement had a particularly profound impact on many Jesuits in several Latin American countries. Latin American Jesuits opposed the brutality of military dictatorships in their respective countries, and they were actively engaged with the social and political issues of the time, often at great personal risk. In a similar vein, Bishop Claver, took a vocally critical stance against the Marcos's Martial Law and its enforcers. From the perspective of figures such as Bishop Claver, the immorality of Martial Law was evident in its iron-fisted governmental initiatives, which failed to address the needs of the urban underprivileged and peasant masses, and the regime's human rights violations that led to the imprisonment of numerous martial law critics since 1972. Claver was adamant that the Church must bring the "Good News to the poor" and in order to be that, the Church should advocate for the side of the poor and oppressed. Claver's position exemplified the wider Church emphasis since Vatican II on action for social justice as a basic element of the Church's mission of salvation. The Constitution on the Church in the Modern World, Gaudium et Spes (1965), condemned "the immense economic inequalities which now exist" and called for a commitment to the struggle for social justice.

Instead of perceiving church criticism as a constructive move toward further reforms, the Marcos government adopted a defensive stance and often red-tagged religious social activists as "subversives." While it is true that many members of the Catholic clergy went underground and joined radical movements, the Marcos regime reacted by violently cracking down a number of social action programs of the church, and silencing certain priests and nuns who allegedly engaged in subversive activities. One of the victims in Bukidnon was Fr. Godofredo Alingal, a Jesuit like Claver who also fought for the rights of local farmers against the abuses of Martial Law and its enforcers. Alingal was murdered by unknown assailants in his rectory on 13 April 1981 (Easter Sunday).

An important element of Bishop Claver's anti-Marcos resistance was his strong appeal to nonviolence. Although Claver clashed with the Marcos government as well as with the pro-Marcos conservative elements of the Catholic Church, the bishop did not agree with the Communist Party of the Philippines (CPP) and some radical members of the Catholic clergy who espoused the use of violence to overthrow the regime. Claver remained suspicious of manipulation from the revolutionary left. Instead, through his sermons, talks, and writings, the bishop advocated for peaceful demonstration and called on the people to look for other creative means to oppose the regime. Claver's non-violent opposition is exemplified by his involvement with the Association of Major Religious Superiors, composed of 2,500 Catholic priests and 7,000 nuns, most of them teachers, who have led prayer rallies and symposiums at leading women's colleges.

The bishop used the pulpit, the print media, and the radio to condemn the violations and admonish the abusers, including Bukidnon Governor Carlos Fortich, whose family owned huge landholdings in the province. Claver gained recognition for his pastoral letters published in the Church's newsletter, Ang Bandilyo sa Bukidnon, which circulated Claver's condemnation of government abuses to all parishes in the province. On 7 January 1977, Claver issued a pastoral letter excommunicating any Catholics in his diocese of Malaybalay who might be involved in the torture of prisoners.

In 18 November 1976, the military raided the DXDB (radio station operated by the Bukidnon Catholic Church), took away all its broadcast equipment and left the station padlocked on orders from then defense minister Juan Ponce Enrile. A year later, the Marcos government ordered the military to raid and confiscate the printing equipment of Ang Bandilyo on 22 January 1977. In May 1977, Claver was the first bishop, among a growing number of Catholic clergy and lay leaders, to be arrested by the Marcos dictatorship. Prior to this, the Marcos government used coercion to intimidate the Jesuit bishop when the government used its influence to deny the bishop a visa to attend church meetings in the United States. At the last minute, however, he was permitted to travel to the United States.

As a result of his anti-Marcos activities, Claver made plenty of enemies in politics and the Church. One of his arch opponents was Vatican's papal nuncio, Archbishop Bruno Torpigliani, who was lamentably a personal friend of the first lady, Imelda Marcos. The nuncio was delighted to receive Bishop Claver's resignation in 1984 as bishop of Malaybalay after 15 years so a diocesan priest could succeed him. On hindsight, Claver's decision to vacate his office allowed him to redirect his energies to mounting a more vigorous campaign against the Marcos regime.

== 1986 People Power Revolution ==
After resigning as bishop in 1984, Claver moved back to Manila to assist Fr. John Caroll, SJ who was the head of the newly founded Institute for Church and Social Issues (ICSI) of the Ateneo de Manila University. At the time, the assassination of Ninoy Aquino a year earlier unleashed outrage across socioeconomic lines against Marcos. It did not help that Aquino's assassination worsened the economic conditions of the country that furthered the disenchantment of the urban middle class and economic elites. Claver continued to share his reflection and analysis of issues afflicting Philippine society under the corrupt Marcos dictatorship through writing, advising and commenting on issues of Church and state and the enduring injustices and divisions in Philippine society under the corrupt Marcos regime.

In the aftermath of the 1986 Snap elections, Claver drafted the official post-election declaration of the Catholic Bishops' Conference of the Philippines (CBCP), which declared that in the bishops' judgment, “the polls were unparalleled in the fraudulence of their conduct.” While the statement did not propose any concrete steps, it called on the people to verify the facts in the light of their own experience and to discern what steps to take. The statement drafted by Claver for the CBCP is noteworthy since it was issued despite two warnings from the Vatican that they should tread lightly in view of the “grave danger” to the Church. The Filipino bishops decided that it was within their competence, and indeed that it was their responsibility. The declaration drafted by Claver foreshadowed Cardinal Sin's call to the public a week later, urging them to take to the streets. This pivotal moment marked one of the key turning points in the EDSA People Power Revolution, ultimately leading to the downfall of the Marcos dictatorship.

== Notes ==
Catholic Church titles
Preceded by Brigido A. Galasgas	Vicar Apostolic of Bontoc-Lagawe; 1995–2004	Succeeded by Cornelio Wigwigan
New title	Bishop of Malaybalay; 1982–1984	Succeeded by Gaudencio B. Rosales
Preceded by Inaugural	Prelate of Malaybalay; 1969–1982	Succeeded by Himself as Bishop of Malaybalay
Preceded by Alfred Michael Watson	Titular Bishop of Nationa; 1969–1982	Succeeded by Anthony F. Tonnos
