= Baguio Cathedral =

Roman Catholic church in Baguio, Philippines

- The Baguio Cathedral and Diocesan Shrine of Our Lady of the Atonement
- Catedral y Santuario Diocesano de Nuestra Señora de la Expiación (Spanish)
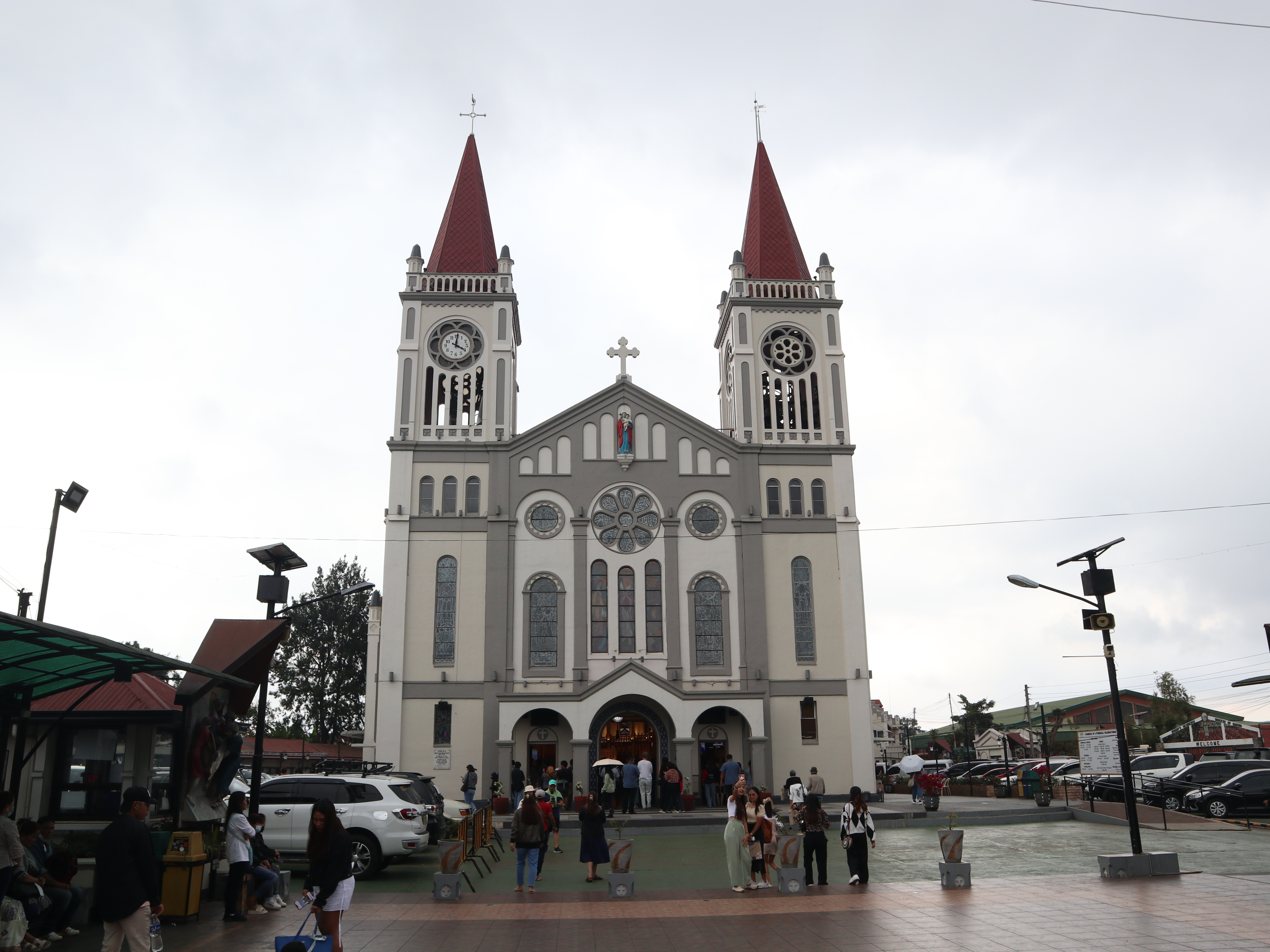
- Cathedral facade in 2024

- Location in Luzon Location in the Philippines
- 16°24′46″N 120°35′54″E
- Location: Kabayanihan, Baguio, Benguet
- Country: Philippines
- Language(s): Filipino, Ilocano, English
- Denomination: Roman Catholic

History
- Status: Cathedral
- Dedication: Our Lady of the Atonement
- Consecrated: July 9, 1936

Architecture
- Functional status: Active
- Architectural type: Church building
- Style: Neo-Romanesque
- Groundbreaking: 1920
- Completed: July 9, 1936

Specifications
- Materials: Gravel, Cement, Steel, Concrete

Administration
- Province: Nueva Segovia
- Metropolis: Nueva Segovia
- Archdiocese: Nueva Segovia
- Diocese: Baguio
- Parish: Our Lady of the Atonement

Clergy
- Bishop: Rafael T. Cruz
- Rector: Berlynden Dao-anis

The Baguio Cathedral and Diocesan Shrine of Our Lady of the Atonement is a Roman Catholic cathedral and the see of the Diocese of Baguio in the Philippines. It is located at Cathedral Loop adjacent to Session Road in Baguio.

Dedicated to the Blessed Virgin Mary under the title of Our Lady of Atonement, its distinctive exterior, twin spires and stained glass windows make it a popular tourist attraction in Baguio. It served as an evacuation center under the Japanese Occupation during the Second World War.

== History ==
In 1907, a Catholic mission chapel, dedicated to St. Patrick, was established by Belgian missionaries from the Congregatio Immaculati Cordis Mariae. The site where the cathedral currently stands was a hill referred to as Kampo by the Ibaloi people. Construction of the cathedral itself began in 1920 under the leadership of the parish priest, Florimond Carlu. The building was completed and consecrated in 1936. It was dedicated to Our Lady of Atonement.

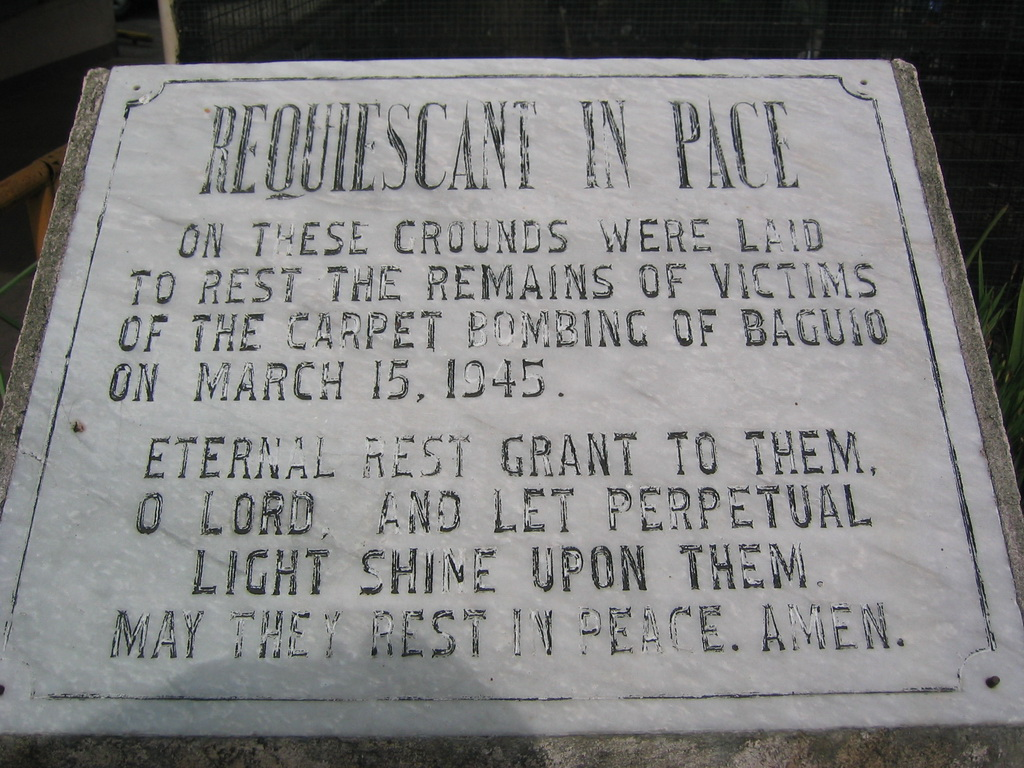
Memorial plaque to the carpet bombing victims buried in the cathedral grounds

During the Second World War, the cathedral served as an evacuation center, and was the only building in Baguio that withstood the carpet-bombing of the city by American forces during liberation on March 15, 1945. Former Baguio mayor Virginia de Guia, recalled that refugees "packed the church like sardines when the airplanes came". US troops began its first air raid on Baguio on January 6, 1945, after which came an almost daily carpet-bombing which reduced most of the city to rubble. Among the areas bombed were the Baguio City Hall, Session Road, and the front of the cathedral, where hundreds of civilians who sought refuge died. The remains of the thousands that had died in the bombardment are interred within the cathedral precinct.

In February 1986, anti-dictatorship organizers based in the Azotea Building and in Cafe Amapola on Session Road learned that the People Power Revolution had begun in Manila. Deciding that their locations were too unsafe, they encamped in the courtyard of the cathedral, which was located on higher ground. Thus, it became the site where Baguio residents had gathered to protest the abuses of the Marcos administration—their own contribution to the largely peaceful revolution.

== Features ==
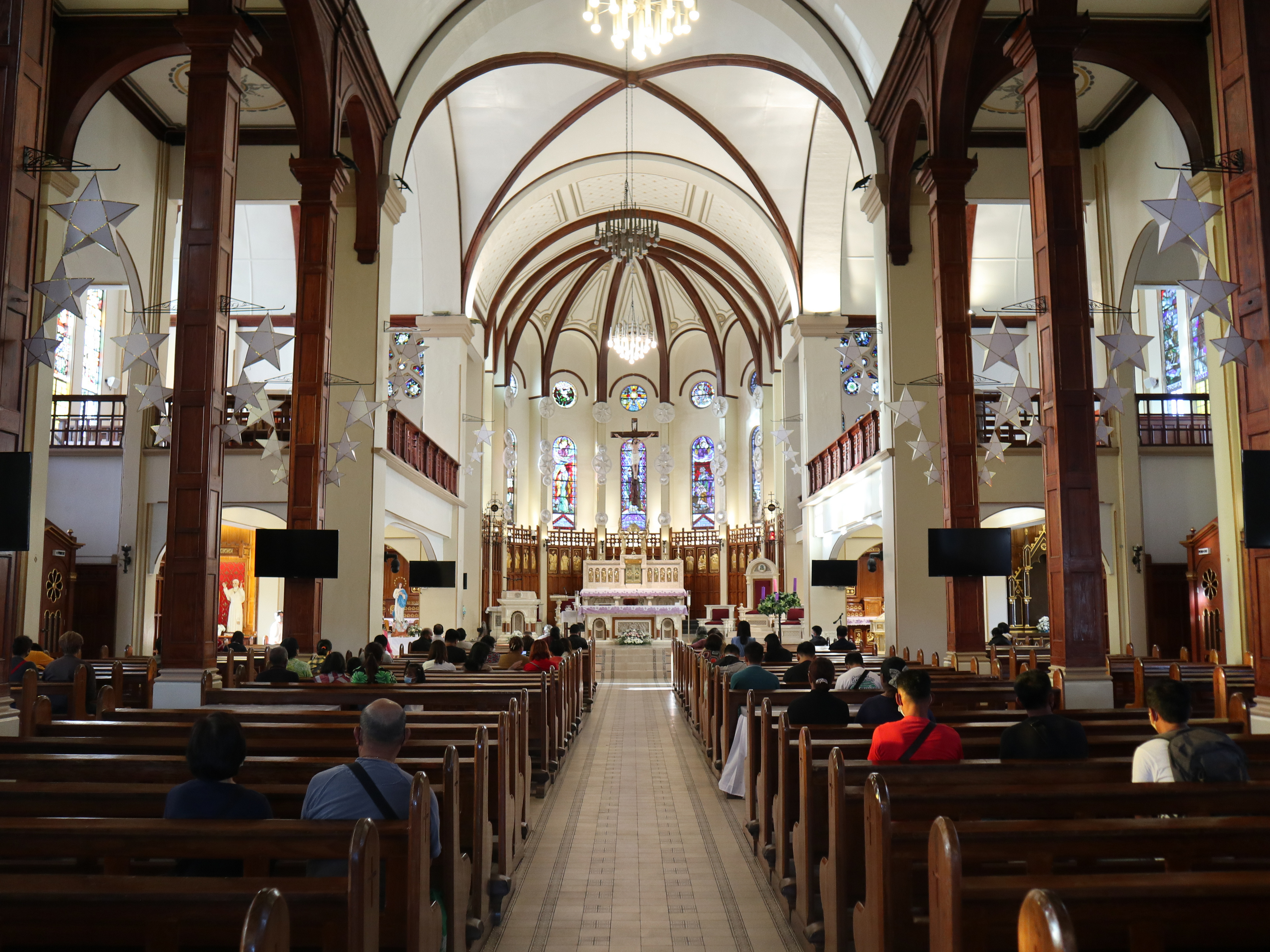
Cathedral interior in 2022

The cathedral has a distinctive façade with a rose window and twin square belfries with pyramidal roofs. Within its large courtyard is a viewing deck that overlooks Session Road and the downtown commercial district of Baguio.

The cathedral is accessible to pedestrians from Session Road via 104-step stone staircase that ends at a Calvary, or through the adjacent campus of Saint Louis University.

A mural on the cathedral grounds, carved by Baguio artist Clinton Pagao Aniversario in 2017, honors the missionaries of the Congregatio Immaculati Cordis Mariae (CICM) who first began Roman Catholic evangelical work in Mountain Province in the 1900s, and were eventually instrumental in the building of the cathedral.

== Gallery ==
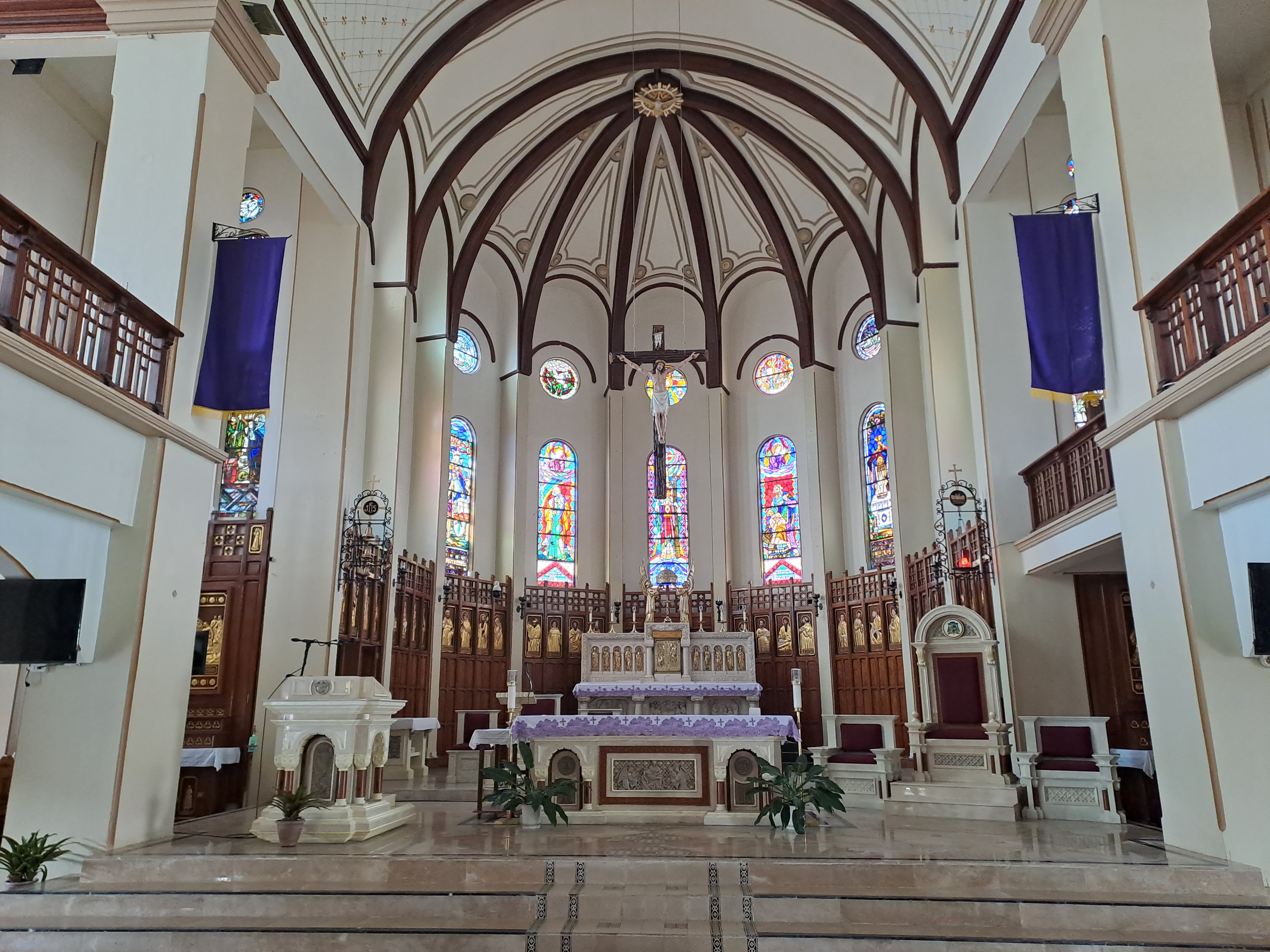
Cathedral altar

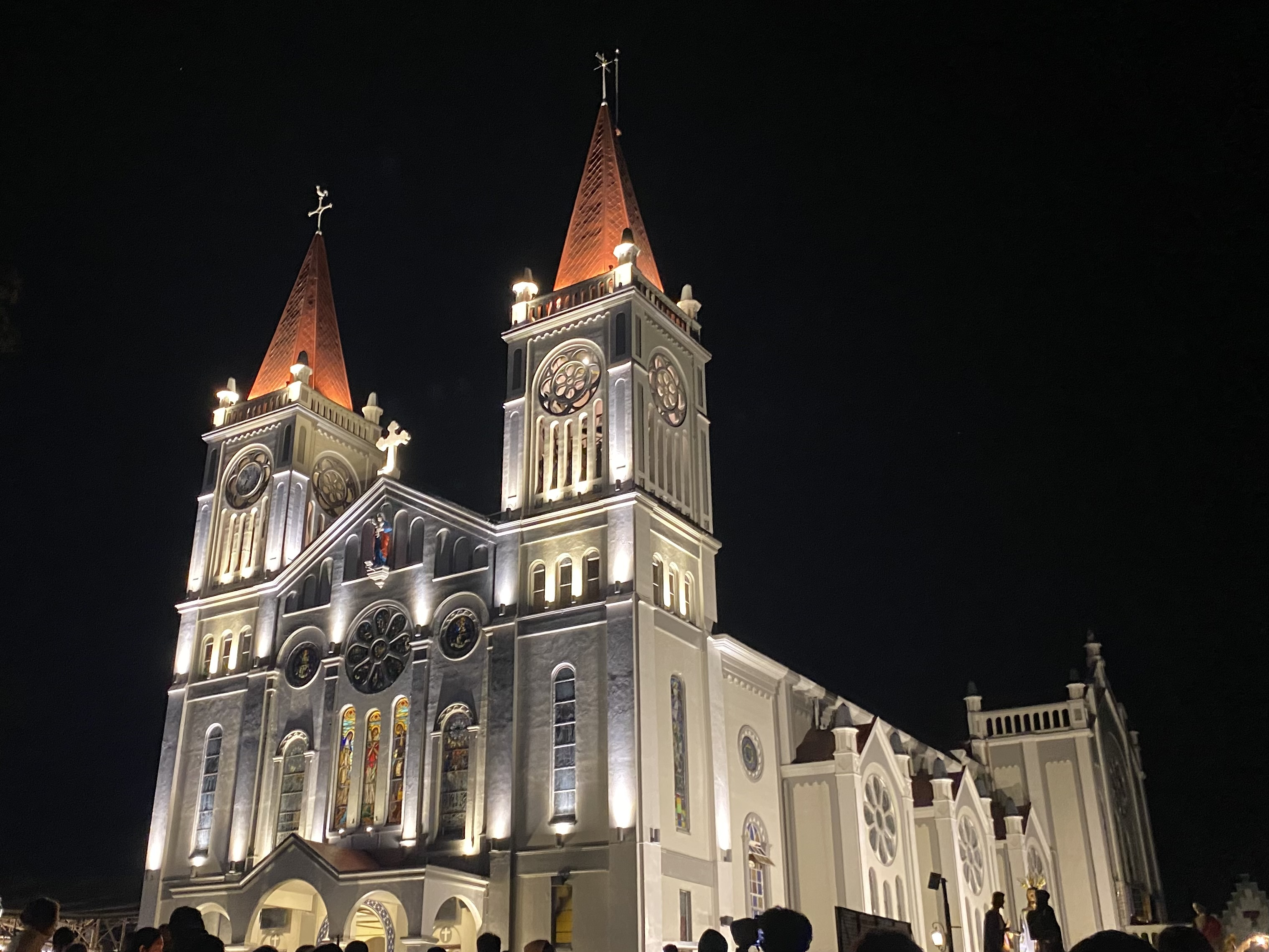
The cathedral at night

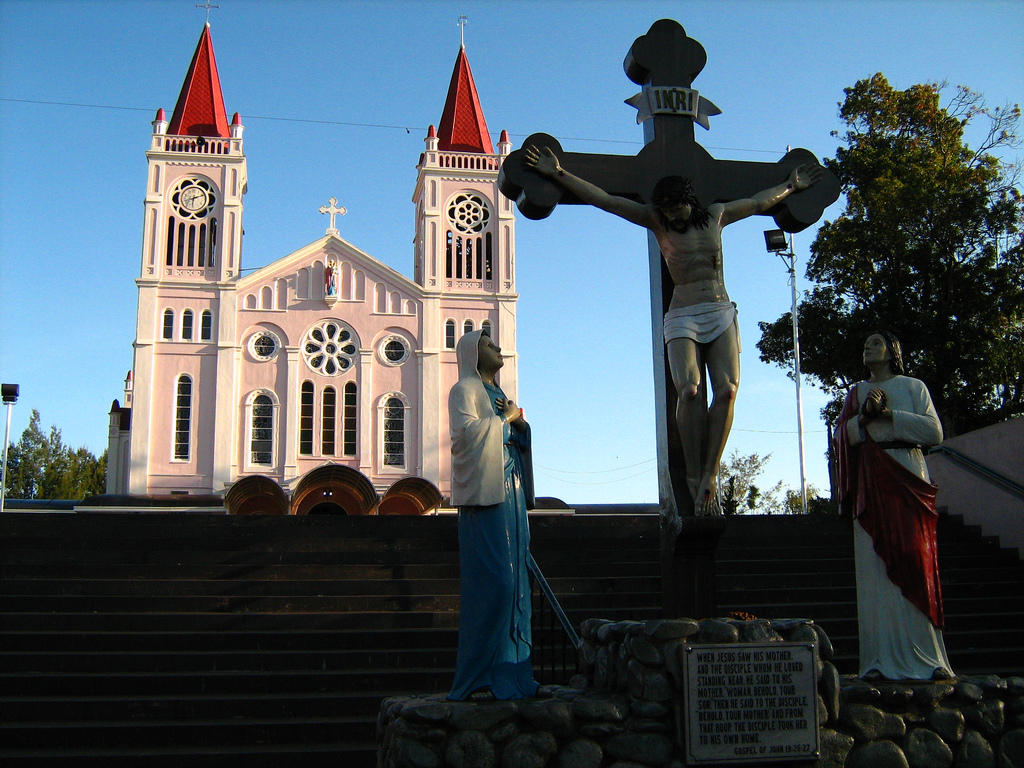
The cathedral from the stairs with the large Calvary at the terminus of the stone stairs

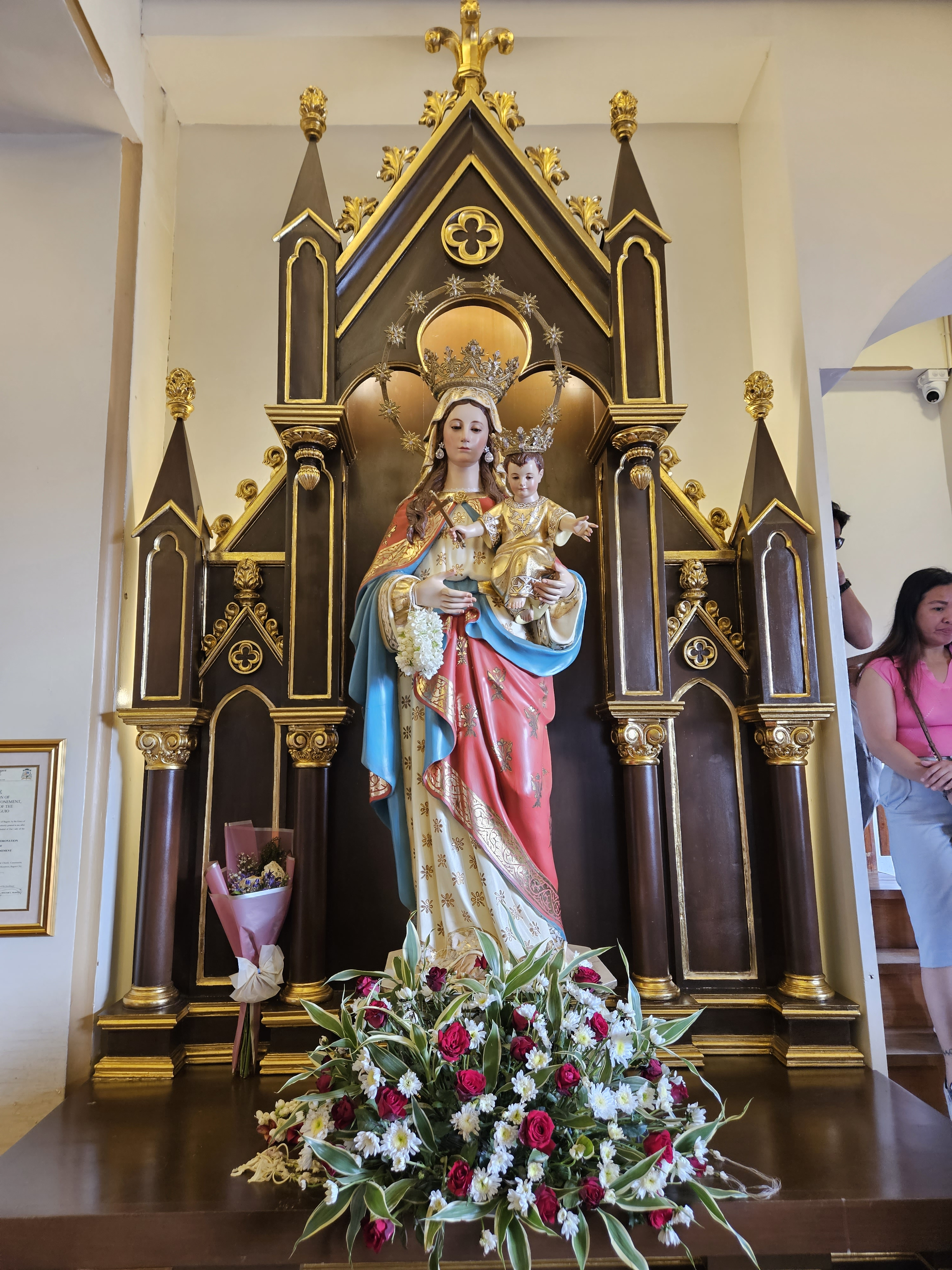
The statue of Our Lady of the Atonement, the titular patroness of the cathedral. It was episcopally crowned on March 25, 2023
