= Diocese of Baguio =

Roman Catholic diocese in the Philippines

Coordinates: 16.4128°N 120.5980°E

Diocese of Baguio Dioecesis Baghiopolitana Diocesis ti Baguio Diyosesis ng Baguio Diócesis de Baguio

Catholic
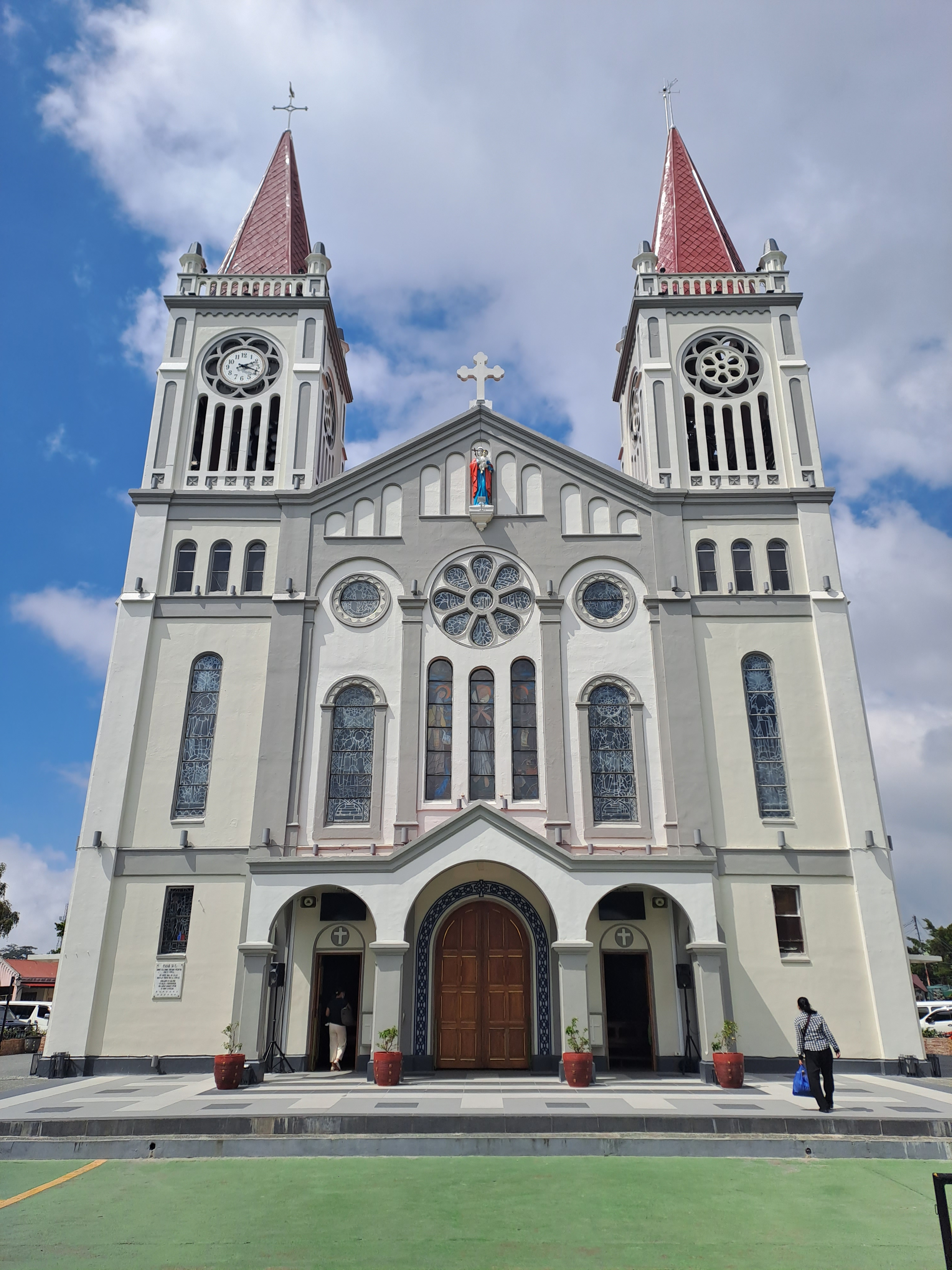
- Baguio Cathedral

- Coat of arms

Location
- Country: Philippines
- Territory: Baguio; Benguet
- Ecclesiastical province: Nueva Segovia
- Metropolitan: Nueva Segovia

Statistics
- Area: 2,655 km^{2} (1,025 sq mi)
- Population: Total; Catholics: (as of 2021); 818,000; 594,000 (72.6%)
- Parishes: 34

Information
- Denomination: Catholic Church
- Sui iuris church: Latin Church
- Rite: Roman Rite
- Established: July 6, 1992 (apostolic vicariate); June 24, 2004 (diocese)
- Cathedral: Our Lady of the Atonement Cathedral
- Patron saint: Our Lady of the Atonement
- Secular priests: 58

Current leadership
- Pope: Leo XIV
- Bishop: Rafael T. Cruz
- Metropolitan Archbishop: David William Antonio
- Vicar General: Roland P. Buyagan

The Diocese of Baguio (Latin: Dioecesis Baghiopolitana) is a Latin Church of the Catholic Church in the Philippines comprising the city of Baguio and the province of Benguet on Luzon island in the Philippines. Its see is the Our Lady of Atonement Cathedral.

It was erected to a diocese in 2004 as a suffragan of the Archdiocese of Nueva Segovia. It is currently headed by the Most Rev. Rafael T. Cruz, the third bishop of Baguio, succeeding Victor Barnuevo Bendico, who was appointed archbishop of Capiz.

== History ==
Coat of arms of the then-Apostolic Vicariate of Mountain Province (Montañosa)

The diocese is one of the oldest ecclesiastical territories in the Philippines. It was established as the Apostolic Prefecture of Mountain Provinces (Latin: Praefectura Apostolica Montana) on July 15, 1932. The territory that the Diocese of Baguio now spans was split from the Archdiocese of Nueva Segovia.

On June 10, 1948, the apostolic prefecture was elevated to the Apostolic Vicariate of Mountain Provinces (Montañosa), entitling it to a titular bishop. The apostolic vicariate received a papal visit from John Paul II in February 1981.

On July 26, 1992, the apostolic vicariate was renamed the Apostolic Vicariate of Baguio, after ceding territories to form the Apostolic Vicariate of Bontoc-Lagawe and the Apostolic Vicariate of Tabuk.

On June 24, 2004, the apostolic vicariate was elevated into the Diocese of Baguio, losing its missionary pre-diocesan status and becoming a suffragan of Archdiocese of Nueva Segovia.

On June 20, 2024, Rafael Tambao-An Cruz was announced as the next bishop, replacing then Bishop Victor Barnuevo Bendico, who was elevated as Archbishop of Capiz in May 2023. He was ordained on September 7 at Dagupan Cathedral by Archbishop Socrates Villegas of Lingayen-Dagupan as principal consecrator, with Archbishop Victor Barnuevo Bendico of Capiz and Bishop Jesse Mercado of Parañaque as co-consecrators. His installation took place on September 17, 2024, led by Archbishop Charles John Brown and Jose Cardinal Advincula of Manila at the Baguio Cathedral.

== Ordinaries ==
These ordinaries are all Latin Rite clergy, who are mostly members of missionary congregations.

No.	Bishop	Period in office	Notes	Coat of arms
Prefects apostolic of the Mountain Provinces (November 15, 1935 – June 10, 1948)
1	Giuseppe Billiet, C.I.C.M.	November 15, 1935 – 1947 (12 years)	Died in office	
Vicars apostolic of the Mountain Provinces (June 10, 1948 – December 18, 1987)
1	William Brasseur, C.I.C.M.	June 10, 1948 – November 7, 1981 (33 years, 150 days)	Retired	
2'	Emiliano Kulhi Madangeng	November 7, 1981 – December 18, 1987 (6 years, 41 days)	Retired	
Vicars apostolic of Baguio (December 18, 1987 – June 24, 2004)
3	Ernesto Antolin Salgado	December 18, 1987 – December 7, 2000 (12 years, 355 days)	Appointed bishop of Laoag	
4	Carlito Joaquin Cenzon	January 25, 2002 – June 24, 2004 (2 years, 151 days)	Elevated as diocesan bishop	
Bishops of Baguio (June 24, 2004 – present)
1	Carlito Joaquin Cenzon	June 24, 2004 – October 1, 2016 (12 years, 99 days)	Retired	
2	Victor Barnuevo Bendico	January 10, 2017 – March 3, 2023 (6 years, 52 days)	Appointed archbishop of Capiz	
3	Rafael Tambaoan Cruz	September 17, 2024 – present (2 years, 41 days)		

== Coadjutor vicars apostolic ==
Coadjutor vicars apostolic of the Mountain Provinces/Baguio
No.	Portrait	Name	From	Until	Duration	Notes
1		Emiliano K. Madangeng; 1927–1997	July 4, 1979	November 7, 1981	2 years, 4 months, 3 days	Appointed vicar apostolic of Mountain Provinces.
2		Ernesto A. Salgado; 1936–	October 17, 1986	December 18, 1987	1 year, 2 months, 1 day	Appointed vicar apostolic of Baguio; later archbishop of Nueva Segovia.

== Auxiliary bishops ==
Auxiliary bishops of the Mountain Provinces/Baguio
No.	Portrait	Name	From	Until	Duration	Notes
1		Emiliano K. Madangeng; 1927–1997	April 24, 1971	July 4, 1979	8 years, 2 months, 10 days	Appointed coadjutor vicar apostolic of Mountain Provinces.
2		Sebastian A. Dalis; 1925–2004	November 18, 1987	July 11, 2000	12 years, 7 months, 23 days	Retired.

== See also ==
- Catholic Church in the Philippines
- List of Catholic dioceses in the Philippines
- Our Lady of Covadonga

== Sources and external links ==
- GCatholic with incumbent biography links
- Dioecesis Baghiopolitana Catholic-Hierarchy.org
