= Sofronio Bancud =

Filipino Catholic prelate (born 1977)

The Most Reverend Sofronio A. Bancud S.S.S., D.D.
- Bishop Emeritus of Cabanatuan
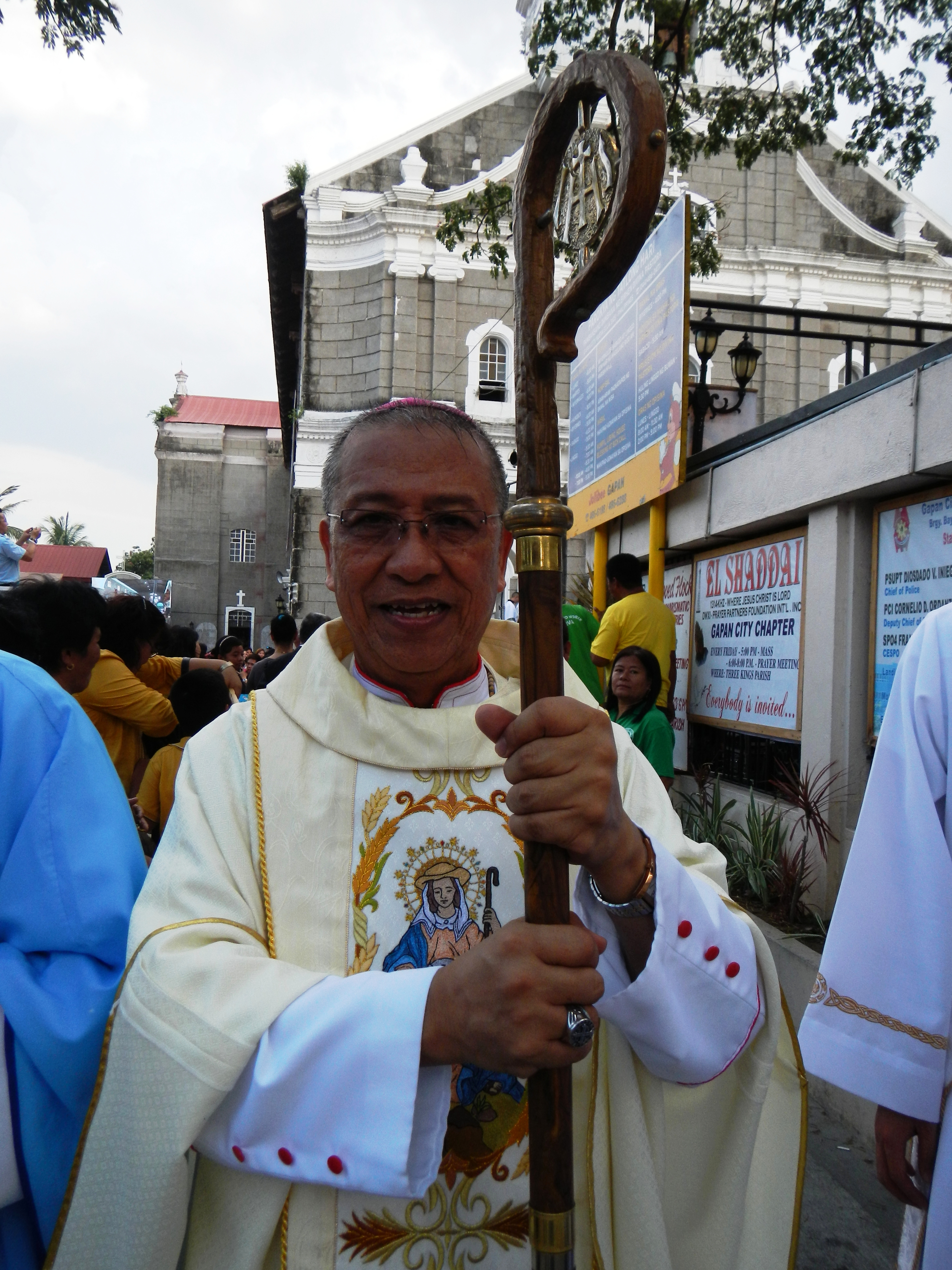
- Bancud at Gapan Church in 2014
- Province: Lingayen–Dagupan
- See: Cabanatuan
- Appointed: November 6, 2004
- Installed: January 25, 2005
- Retired: December 8, 2024
- Predecessor: Sofio Balce
- Successor: Prudencio Andaya Jr.
- Previous posts: Auxiliary Bishop of Cabanatuan (2001–2004); Titular Bishop of Bida (2001–2004); Apostolic Administrator of Bayombong (2016–2018)

Orders
- Ordination: May 2, 1977
- Consecration: August 2, 2001 by Antonio Franco

Personal details
- Born: Sofronio Aguirre Bancud; December 8, 1948 (age 77) Atulayan Norte, Tuguegarao City, Cagayan, Philippines
- Denomination: Roman Catholic
- Residence: Cabanatuan, Nueva Ecija, Philippines
- Motto: Accipite Et Manducate "Take, eat, this is my Body." – Matthew 26:26
- Coat of arms: Sofronio A. Bancud's coat of arms

Ordination history
History
Episcopal consecration
- Principal consecrator: Antonio Franco
- Co-consecrators: Diosdado Talamayan; Sofio G. Balce
- Styles
- Reference style: His Excellency; The Most Reverend
- Spoken style: Your Excellency
- Religious style: Bishop

Sofronio Aguirre Bancud (born December 8, 1948) is a Filipino bishop of the Roman Catholic Church who served as the Bishop of Cabanatuan from 2004 to 2024. He previously served as an auxiliary bishop of the same diocese from 2001 to 2004.

== Early life and education ==
Bancud was born on December 8, 1948, in Atulayan Norte, Tuguegarao City, Cagayan, to Antonio Bancud and Soledad Aguirre. He completed his elementary education at St. Paul University and his secondary studies at Cagayan State University, both located in Tuguegarao City. In 1969, he earned a Bachelor of Commerce degree from the University of Santo Tomas in Manila. He later joined the Congregation of the Blessed Sacrament and made his religious profession on December 9, 1972. He pursued theological studies at St. Francis Xavier Regional Seminary in Davao City, where he obtained a licentiate in Sacred Theology in 1977.

He also pursued further formation through the Summer Institute of Spirituality at Notre Dame de Vie in Quezon City in 1978, the Institute for Formative Spirituality at the Emmaus Center in Marikina City from 1983 to 1985, and the Sabbatical Program at the Hesburgh Center for Continuing Formation in Ministry in Chicago, Illinois, in 1999.

== Priesthood ==
After his ordination on May 2, 1977, he served as Parochial Vicar of Our Lady of the Assumption Parish in Davao City from 1977 to 1980. During this period, he was also Postulant Director of the Blessed Sacrament Community in Davao. From 1980 to 1988, and again from 1989 to 1993, he served as Novice Master of the Blessed Sacrament Novitiate in San Jose del Monte City, Bulacan. He was Scholastic Director from 1988 to 1989 and served as Parish Administrator of Our Lady of the Assumption Parish in Davao City in 1989. He was also Assistant Regional Superior of the Our Lady of the Assumption Region of the congregation in the Philippines from 1981 to 1993.

From 1983 to 1993, he was a member of the International Formation Commission of the Congregation of the Blessed Sacrament. He was elected General Consultor of the SSS General Curia in Rome, Italy, where he served from 1993 to 1999. In 2000, he returned to the Philippines and became Superior of the Blessed Sacrament Community in Sta. Cruz, Manila.

== Episcopal ministry ==
On May 24, 2001, Pope John Paul II appointed him Auxiliary Bishop of Cabanatuan and Titular Bishop of Bida. He received episcopal consecration on August 2, 2001, with Archbishop Antonio Franco as principal consecrator.

Following the death of Bishop Sofio G. Balce Jr., he was appointed Bishop of Cabanatuan on November 6, 2004, and installed on January 25, 2005, in solemn rites held at St. Nicholas of Tolentine Cathedral in Cabanatuan City.

Within the Catholic Bishops' Conference of the Philippines (CBCP), Bishop Bancud held several key roles over the years. He served as Chairman of the Permanent Committee on International Eucharistic Congresses from 2007 to 2013, and represented Luzon Central in the CBCP Permanent Council from 2013 to 2015. From 2015 to 2021, he served as Chairman of the Episcopal Commission on Biblical Apostolate (ECBA), overseeing national biblical pastoral initiatives and Scripture engagement among dioceses.

On December 8, 2024, the second Sunday of Advent, (Note: December 8 is normally the Feast of the Immaculate Conception, but since it fell on a Sunday that year, it was moved to the next day in accordance with liturgical norms.) Pope Francis accepted his resignation in accordance with canon law and appointed Prudencio Andaya Jr., Vicar Apostolic of Tabuk, as his successor.

== See also ==
- Historical list of the Catholic bishops of the Philippines

== Notes ==
Catholic Church titles
Preceded by Sofio Guinto Balce	Bishop of Cabanatuan; January 25, 2005 – December 8, 2024	Succeeded by Prudencio Andaya Jr.
Preceded by Heinrich Machens	— TITULAR — Titular Bishop of Bida; August 2, 2001 – November 6, 2004	Succeeded by Julio Hernando García Peláez
