= Diocese of Cabanatuan =

Latin Catholic diocese in the Philippines

Coordinates: 15.4514°N 120.9529°E

Diocese of Cabanatuan Dioecesis Cabanatuanensis Diyosesis ng Cabanatuan

Catholic
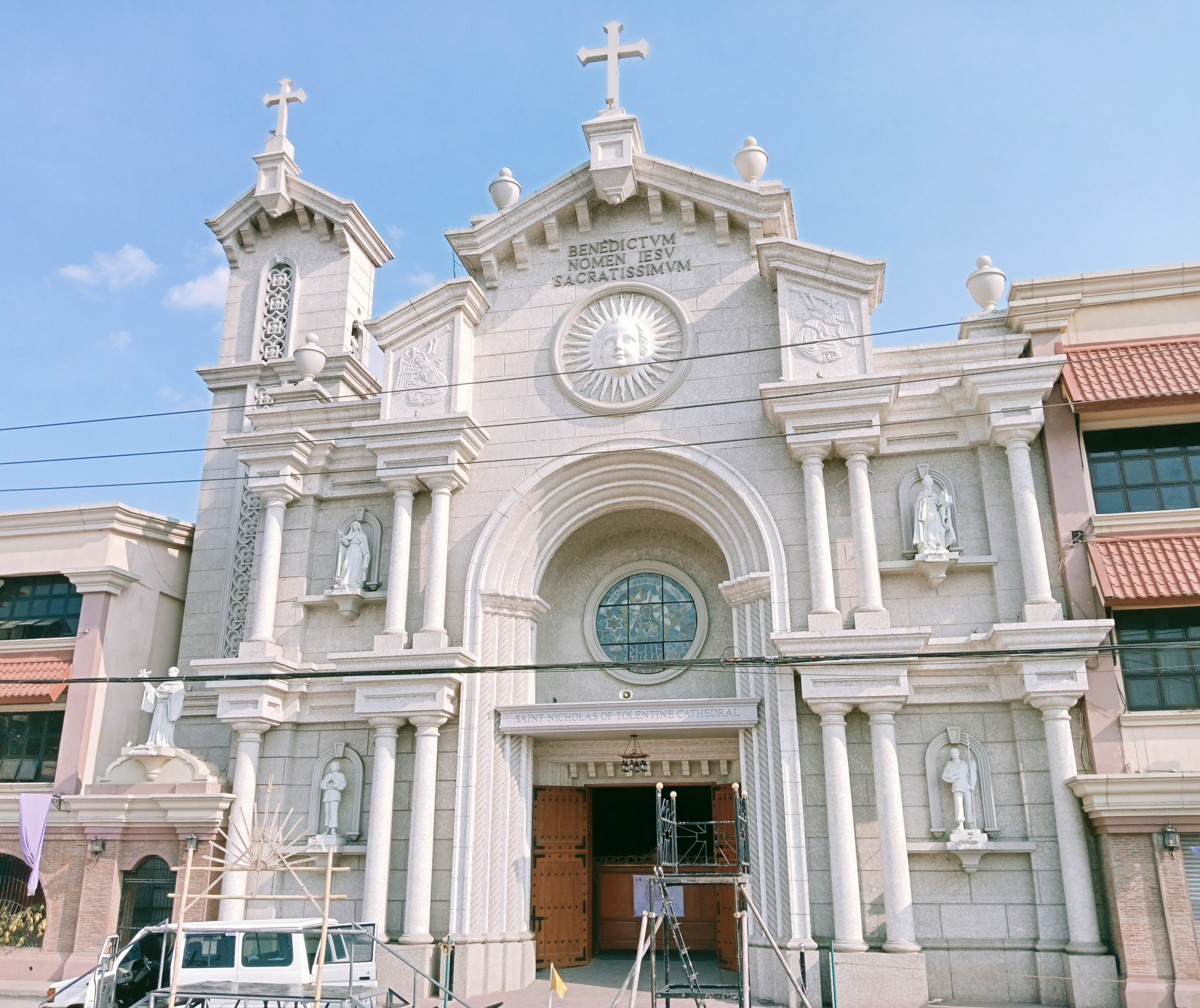
- Cabanatuan Cathedral

- Coat of arms

Location
- Country: Philippines
- Territory: Southern Nueva Ecija (Aliaga, Bongabon, Cabanatuan, Cabiao, Gabaldon, Gapan, General Mamerto Natividad, General Tinio, Jaen, Laur, Palayan, Peñaranda, San Antonio, San Isidro, San Leonardo, Santa Rosa, Talavera, Zaragoza)
- Ecclesiastical province: Lingayen–Dagupan
- Metropolitan: Lingayen–Dagupan

Statistics
- Area: 2,743 km^{2} (1,059 sq mi)
- Population: Total; Catholics: (as of 2021); 1,227,000; 1,034,000 (84.3%)
- Parishes: 30

Information
- Denomination: Catholic
- Sui iuris church: Latin Church
- Rite: Roman Rite
- Established: 16 February 1963
- Cathedral: St. Nicholas of Tolentine Catheral-Parishl in Cabanatuan
- Titular patrons: St. Nicholas of Tolentino; La Virgen Divina Pastora (Patroness)
- Secular priests: 50

Current leadership
- Pope: Leo XIV
- Bishop: Prudencio Padilla Andaya, Jr. CICM
- Metropolitan Archbishop: Socrates Buenaventura Villegas
- Vicar General: Reynold H. Oliveros, JCD
- Judicial Vicar: Reynold H. Oliveros, JCD
- Bishops emeritus: Sofronio Aguirre Bancud, S.S.S., D.D.

The Diocese of Cabanatuan (Latin: Dioecesis Cabanatuanensis) is a Latin Catholic diocese of the Catholic Church in the Philippines. The diocese comprises 16 towns of Nueva Ecija including the cities of Cabanatuan, Palayan, and Gapan. The diocese is a suffragan of the Archdiocese of Lingayen–Dagupan.

== History ==
On February 16, 1963 Pope John XXIII, issued the apostolic letter "Exterior Ecclesiae" creating the Diocese of Cabanatuan in Nueva Ecija separating from the Archdiocese of Lingayen–Dagupan, and then the Diocese of San Fernando. On June 3, 1963 the Diocese of Cabanatuan was canonically erected after that on June 4, 1963 Bishop Mariano Gaviola was ordained and installed as the first bishop of Cabanatuan. The Diocese of Cabanatuan was put under the patronage of Saint Nicholas of Tolentino and the Virgin Mary under the title Divine Shepherdess (Divina Pastora) which is popularly venerated in Gapan every May 1. The seat of the diocese is the St. Nicholas of Tolentino Cathedral in Cabanatuan with a feast day of September 10.

The diocese lost territory in 1984 when the Diocese of San Jose in the Northern Part of Nueva Ecija was formed.

The current bishop emeritus of the diocese and Apostolic administrator is Sofronio Aguirre Bancud, S.S.S., D.D. He was appointed as auxiliary bishop on 2004 and installed as bishop on January 25, 2005. He officially retired on December 8, 2024 after he reached his mandatory retirement age of 76.

On December 8, 2024, Pope Francis appointed Bishop Prudencio Padilla Andaya, Jr., CICM, D.D., until now the second Apostolic Vicar of Tabuk since April 16, 2003, to be the 6th bishop of this diocese. Bishop Andaya was installed on February 3, 2025 at the Cabanatuan Cathedral.

== Ordinaries ==
Ordinaries of the Diocese of Cabanatuan
No.	Portrait	Name	Coat of arms	From	Until	Duration	Notes
Bishops of Cabanatuan (March 8, 1963 – present)
1		Mariano Gaviola y Garcés; 1922–1998		8 Mar 1963	31 May 1967	4 years, 2 months, 23 days	First bishop; later appointed Archbishop of Lipa.
2		Vicente P. Reyes; 1907–1983		8 Aug 1967	7 Apr 1983	15 years, 7 months	Died in office.
3		Ciceron S. Tumbocon; 1922–1990		7 Apr 1983	11 Nov 1990	7 years, 7 months, 4 days	Died in office.
4		Sofio G. Balce; 1941–2004		11 Nov 1990	25 Jun 2004	13 years, 7 months, 14 days	Died in office.
5		Sofronio A. Bancud, S.S.S. 1948–		6 Nov 2004	8 Dec 2024	20 years, 1 month, 2 days	Retired.
6		Prudencio Padilla Andaya Jr. C.I.C.M. 1959–		8 Dec 2024	Incumbent	ongoing	Current bishop.

=== Coadjutor bishops ===
No.	Portrait	Name	From	Until	Duration	Notes
1		Ciceron S. Tumbocon; 1922–1990	18 Aug 1982	7 Apr 1983	7 months, 20 days	Succeeded as bishop of Cabanatuan.
2		Sofio G. Balce; 1941–2004	21 May 1988	11 Nov 1990	2 years, 5 months, 21 days	Succeeded as bishop of Cabanatuan.

=== Auxiliary bishops ===
Auxiliary bishops of the Diocese of Cabanatuan
No.	Portrait	Name	From	Until	Duration	Notes
1		Pedro G. Magugat, M.S.C. 1925–1990	23 Apr 1979	9 Dec 1981	2 years, 7 months, 16 days	Later appointed military vicar of the Philippines.
2		Sofronio A. Bancud, S.S.S. 1948–	24 May 2001	6 Nov 2004	3 years, 5 months, 13 days	Later appointed bishop of Cabanatuan.

== Gallery ==
Gallery of the Diocese of Cabanatuan

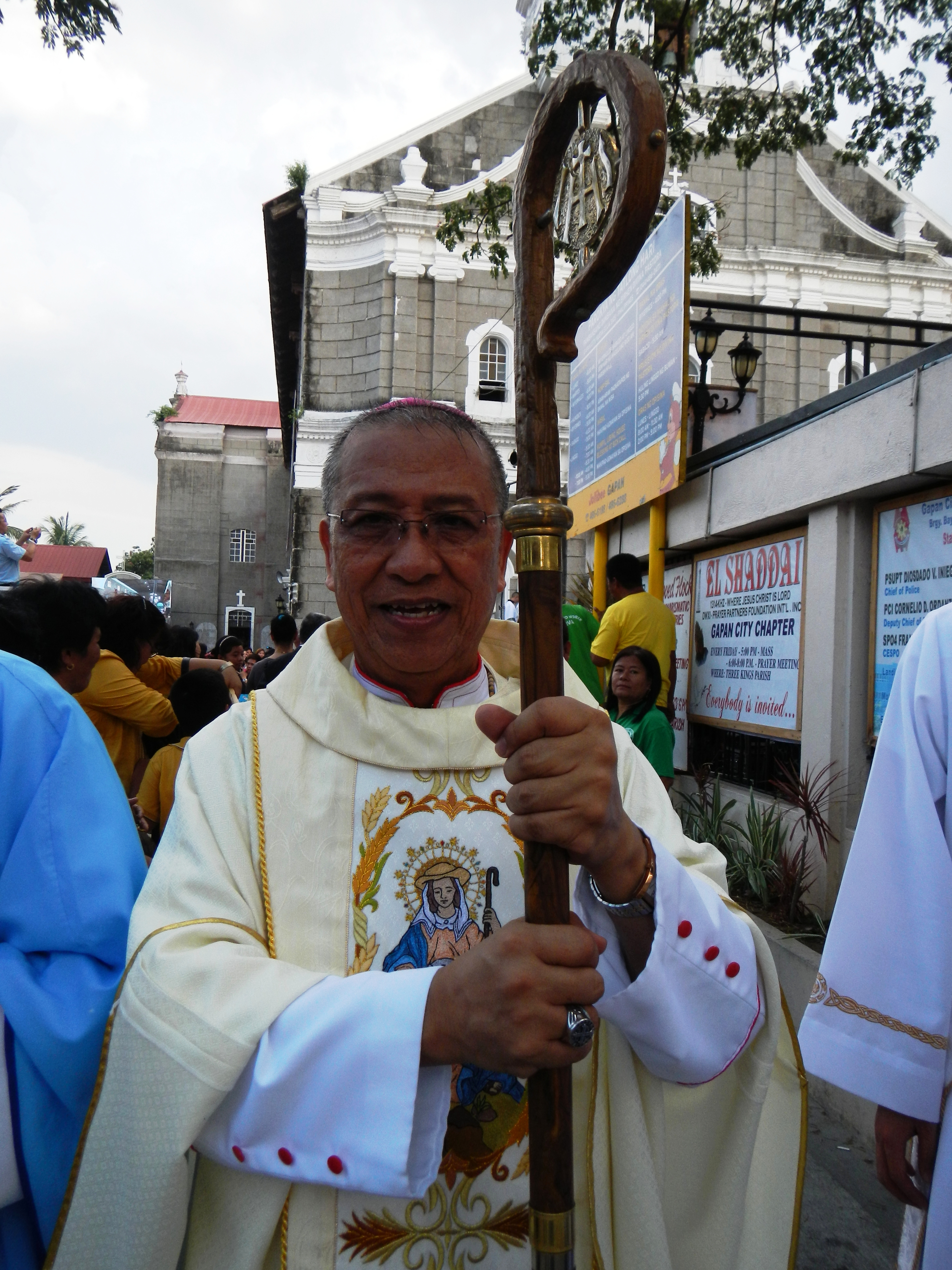
Sofronio Aguirre Bancud, bishop-emeritus of Cabanatuan

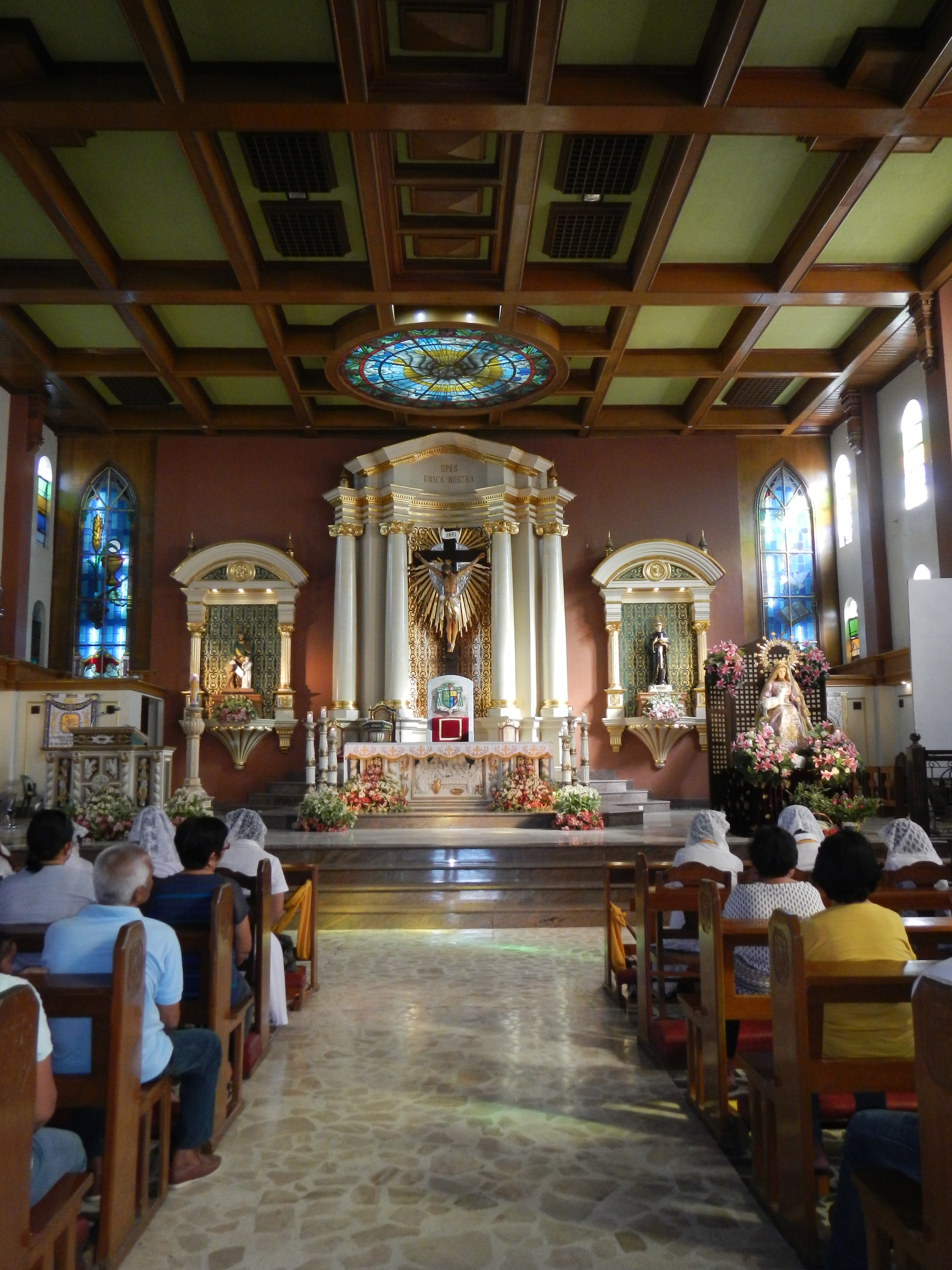
The altar of the Cathedral-Parish of St. Nicholas of Tolentino

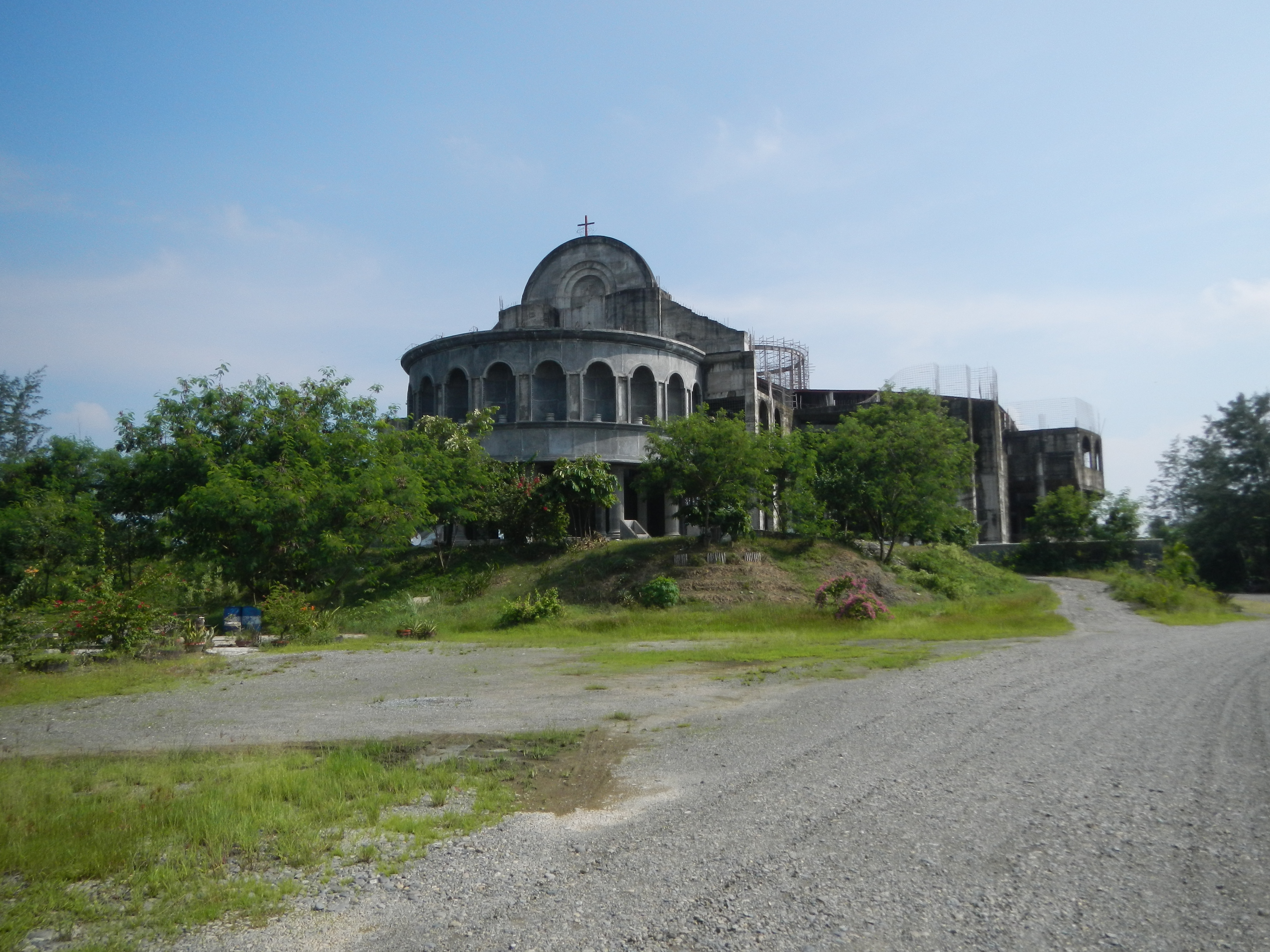
St. Nicholas of Tolentino new cathedral (on-going construction) and crypt

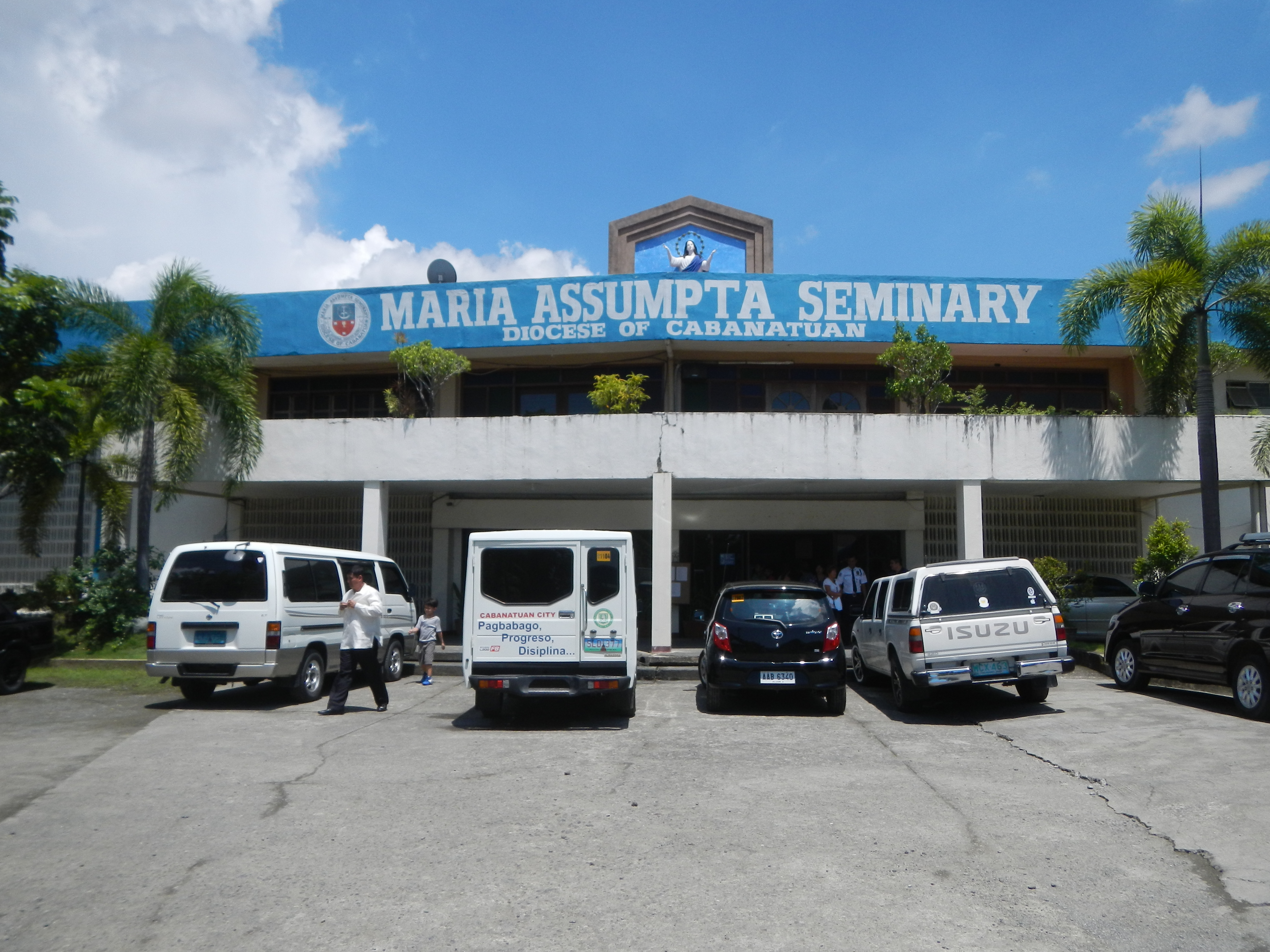
Maria Assumpta Seminary

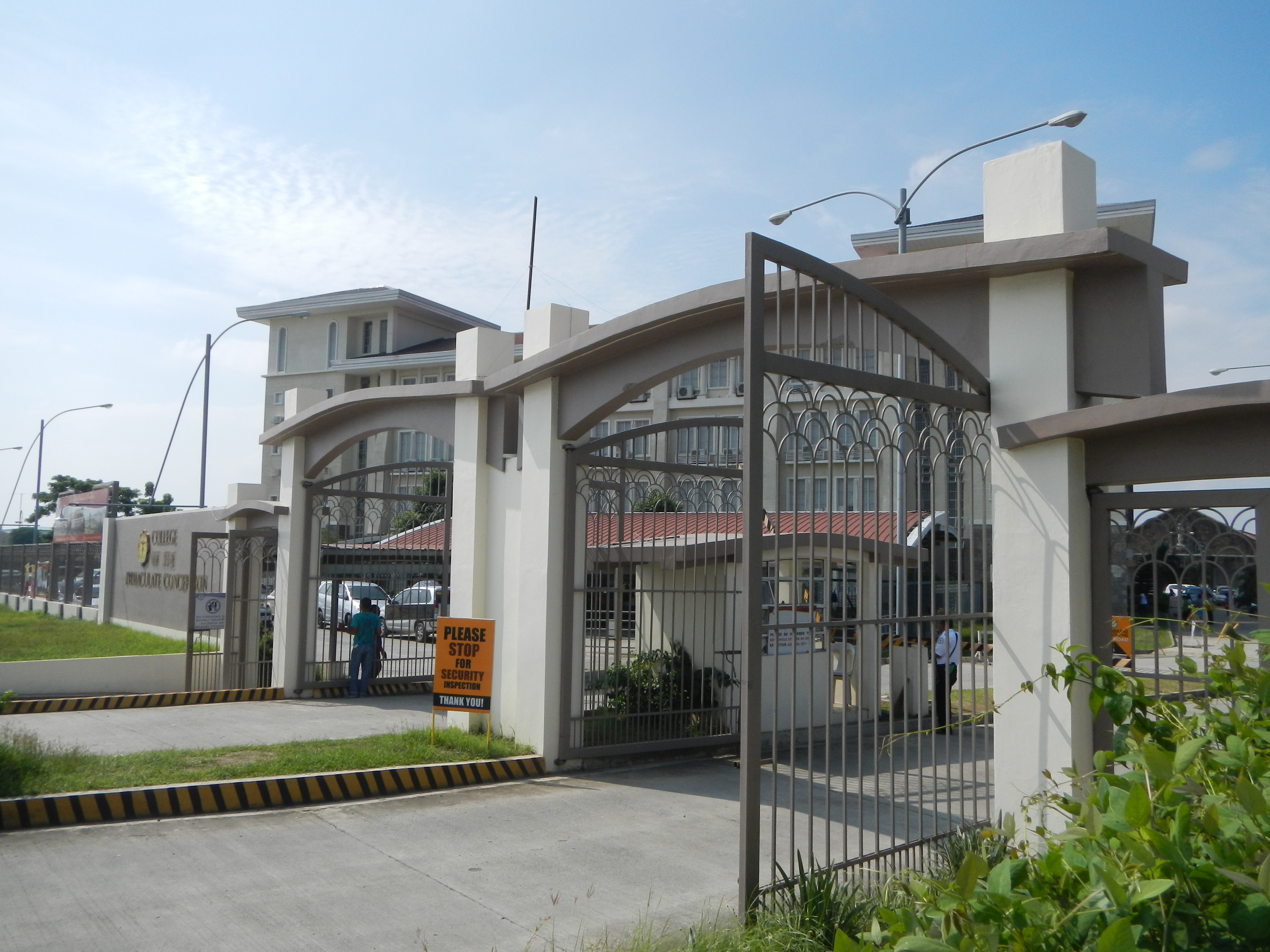
College of the Immaculate Conception (Cabanatuan)
Shrines in the Diocese of Cabanatuan

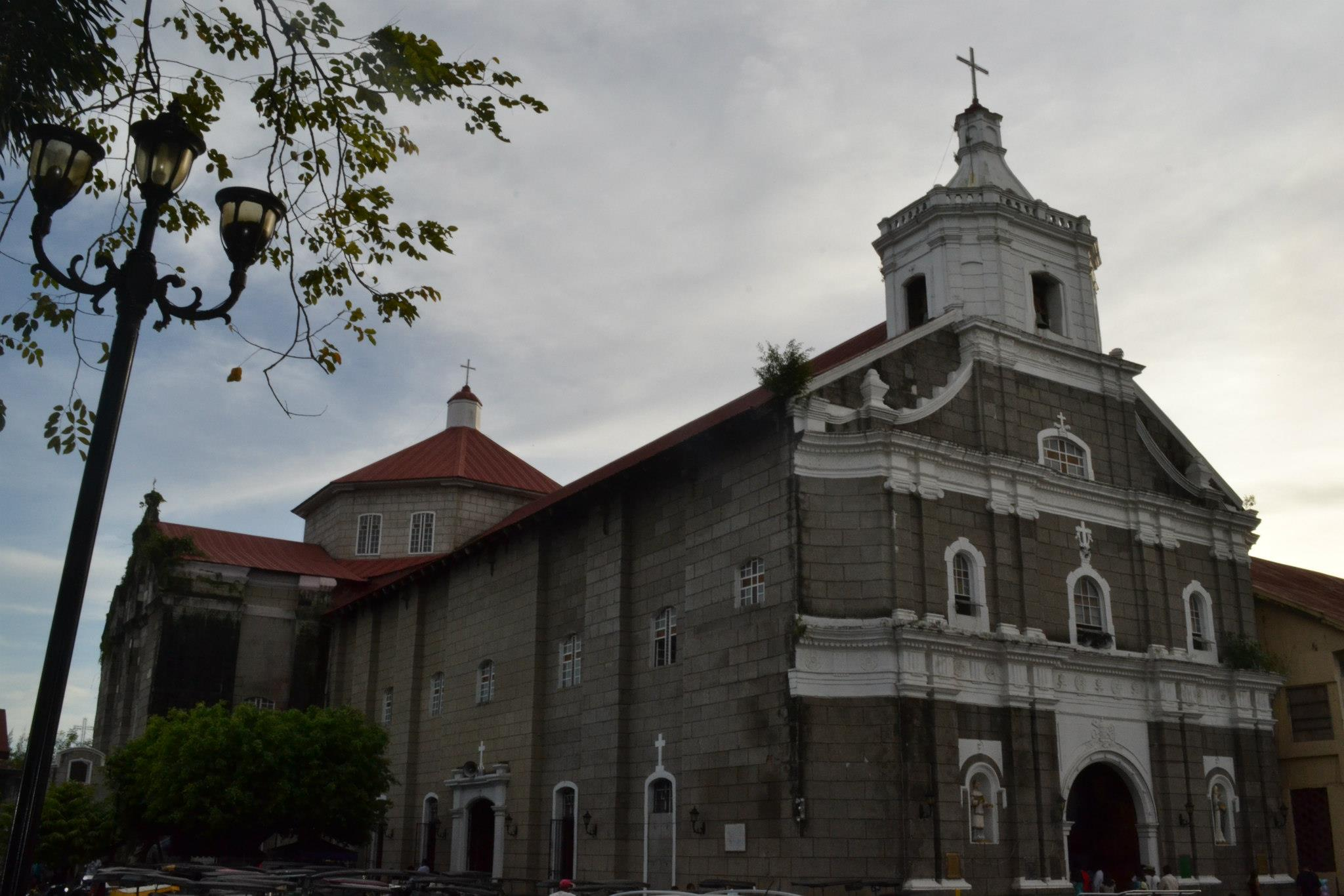
National Shrine of La Virgen Divina Pastora and Three Kings Parish in Gapan, home of the biggest pilgrimage in central Luzon

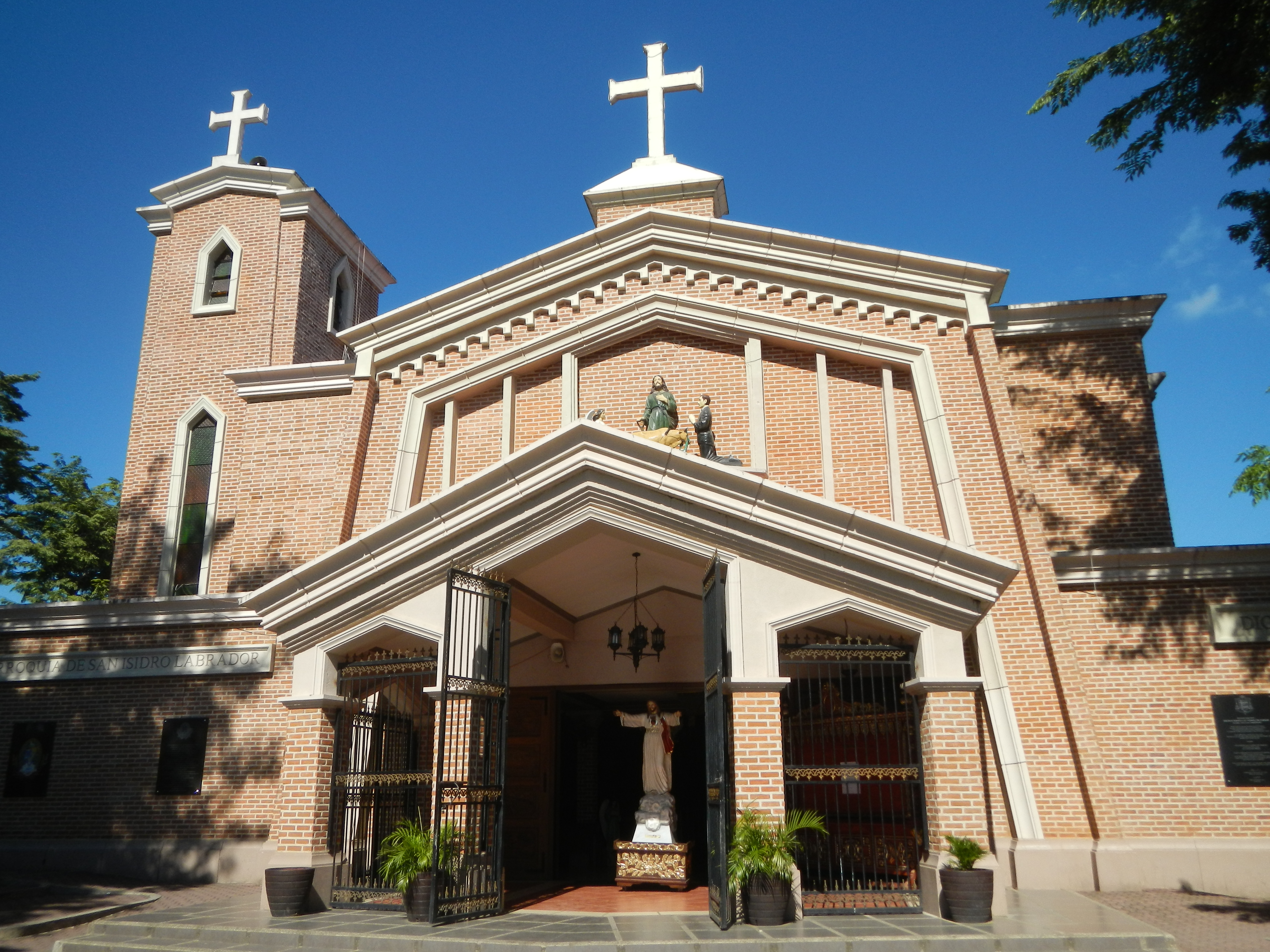
Diocesan Shrine and Parish of St. Isidore the Worker in Talavera

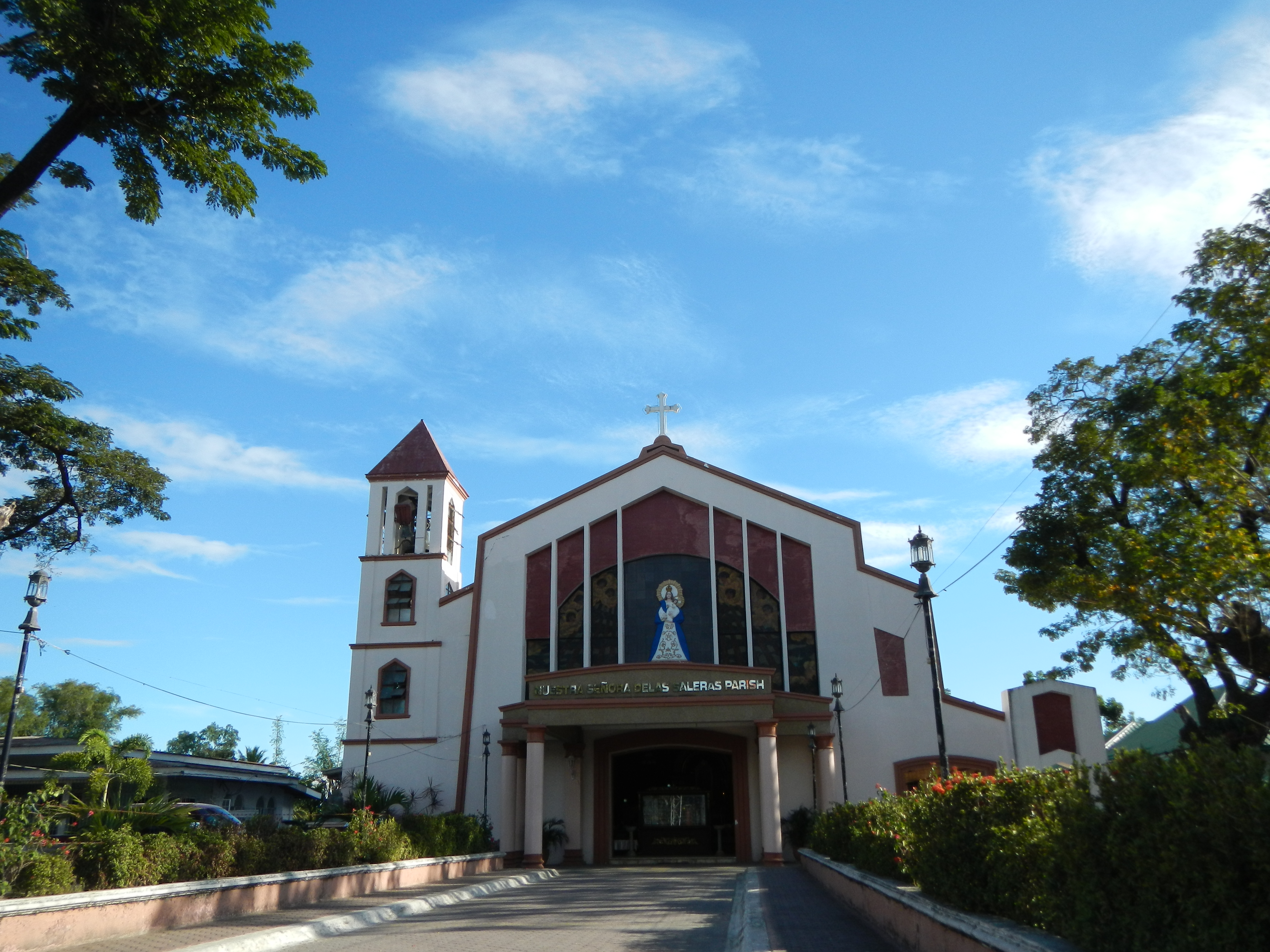
Diocesan Shrine and Parish of Nuestra Señora delas Saleras in Aliaga

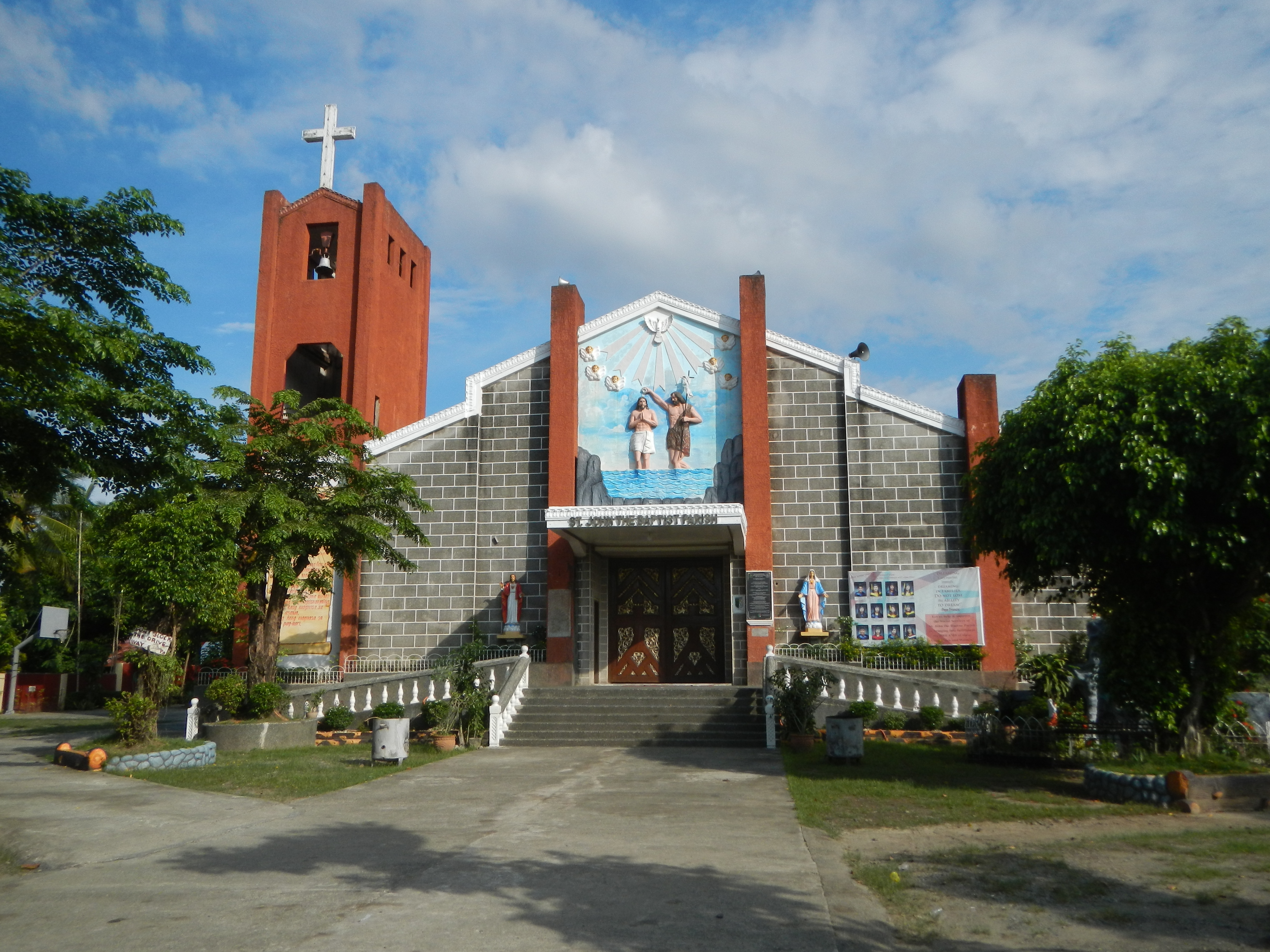
Diocesan Shrine and Parish of St. John the Baptist in Bibiclat, Aliaga, home of Taong Putik Festival

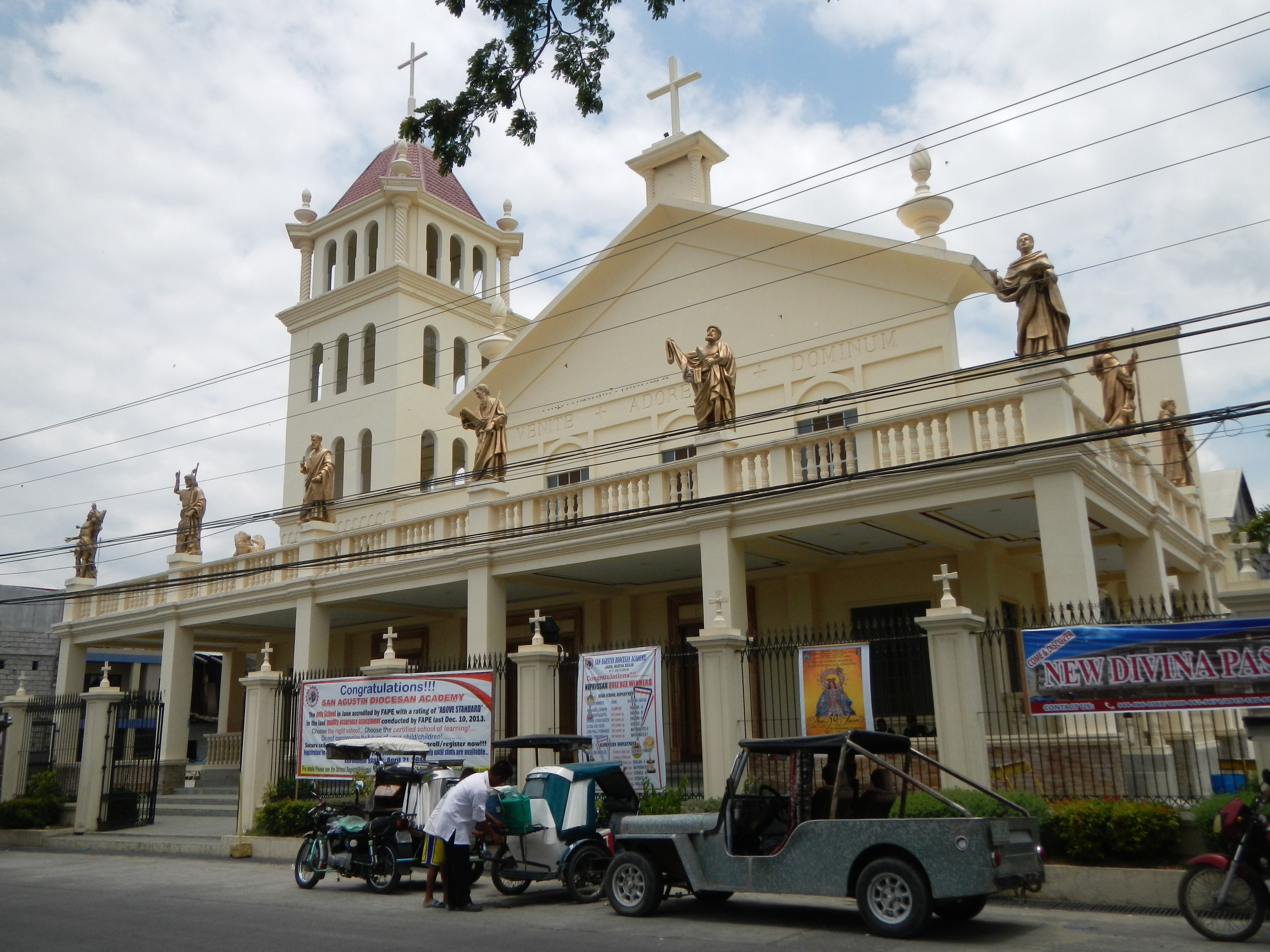
Diocesan Shrine of the Immaculate Conception and St. Augustine Parish in Jaen

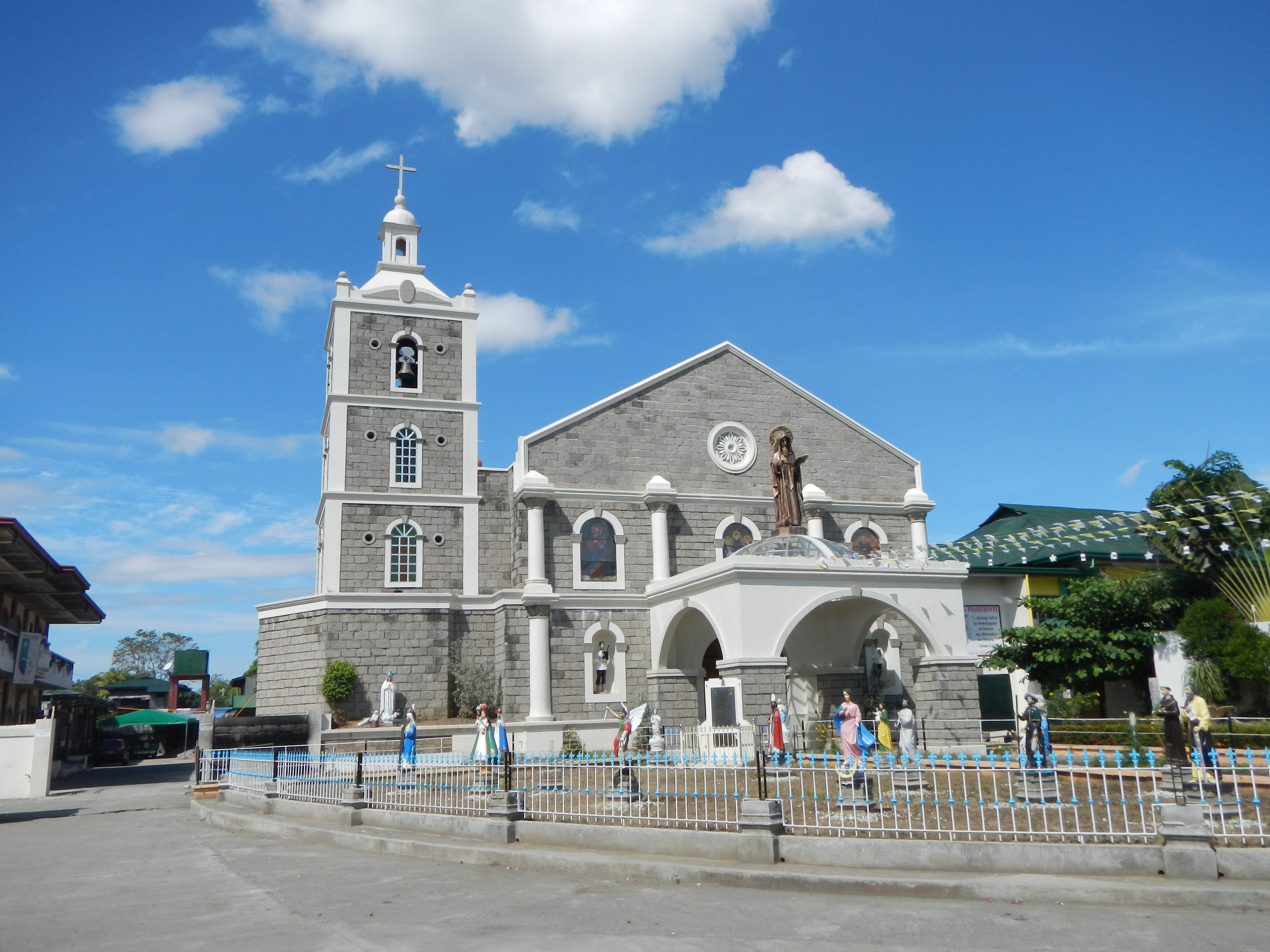
Diocesan Shrine and Parish of St. Anthony of Abbot in San Antonio

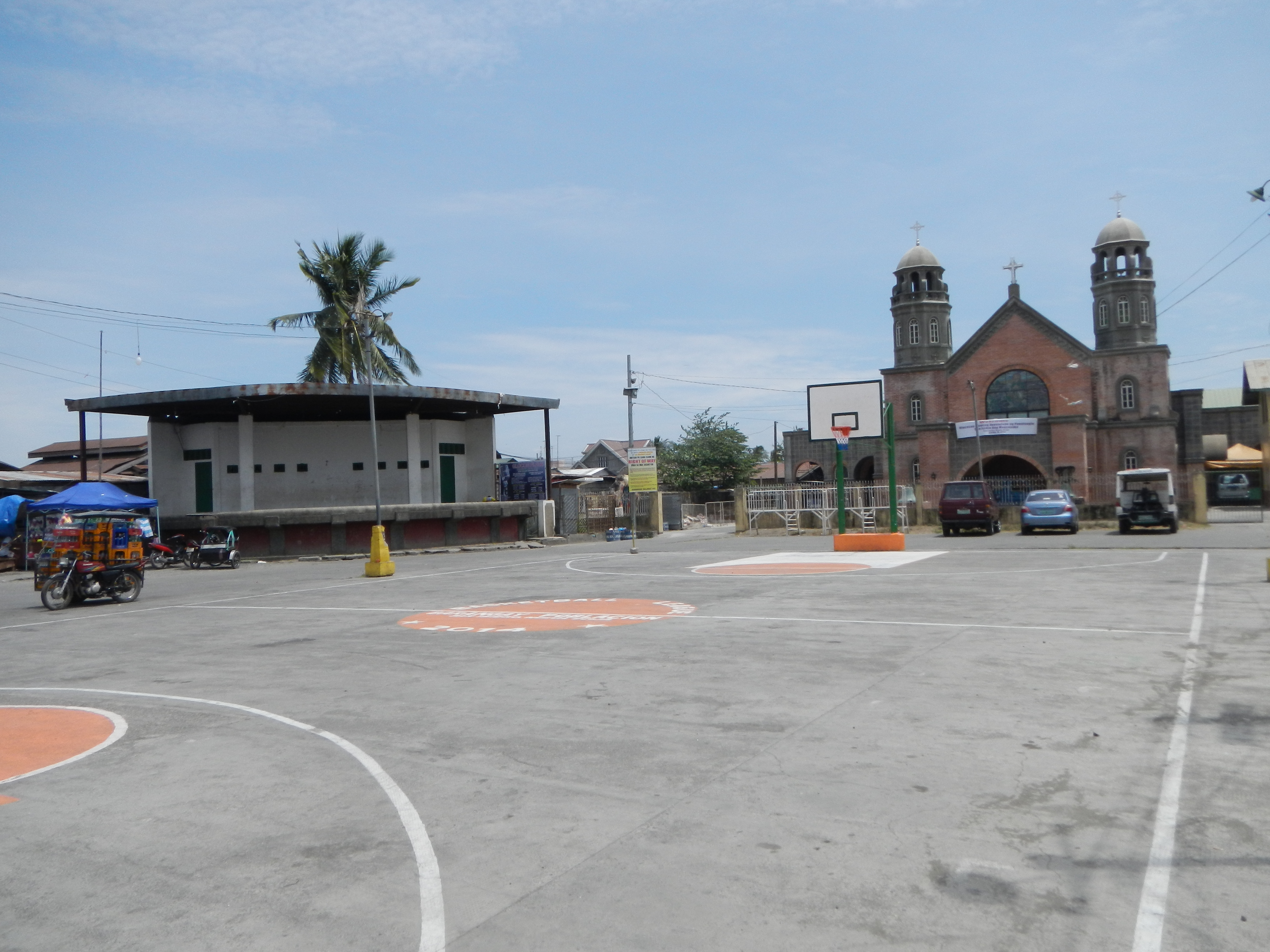
St. Isidore the Farmer Parish and Shrine of Nuestra Señora dela Soledad in San Isidro

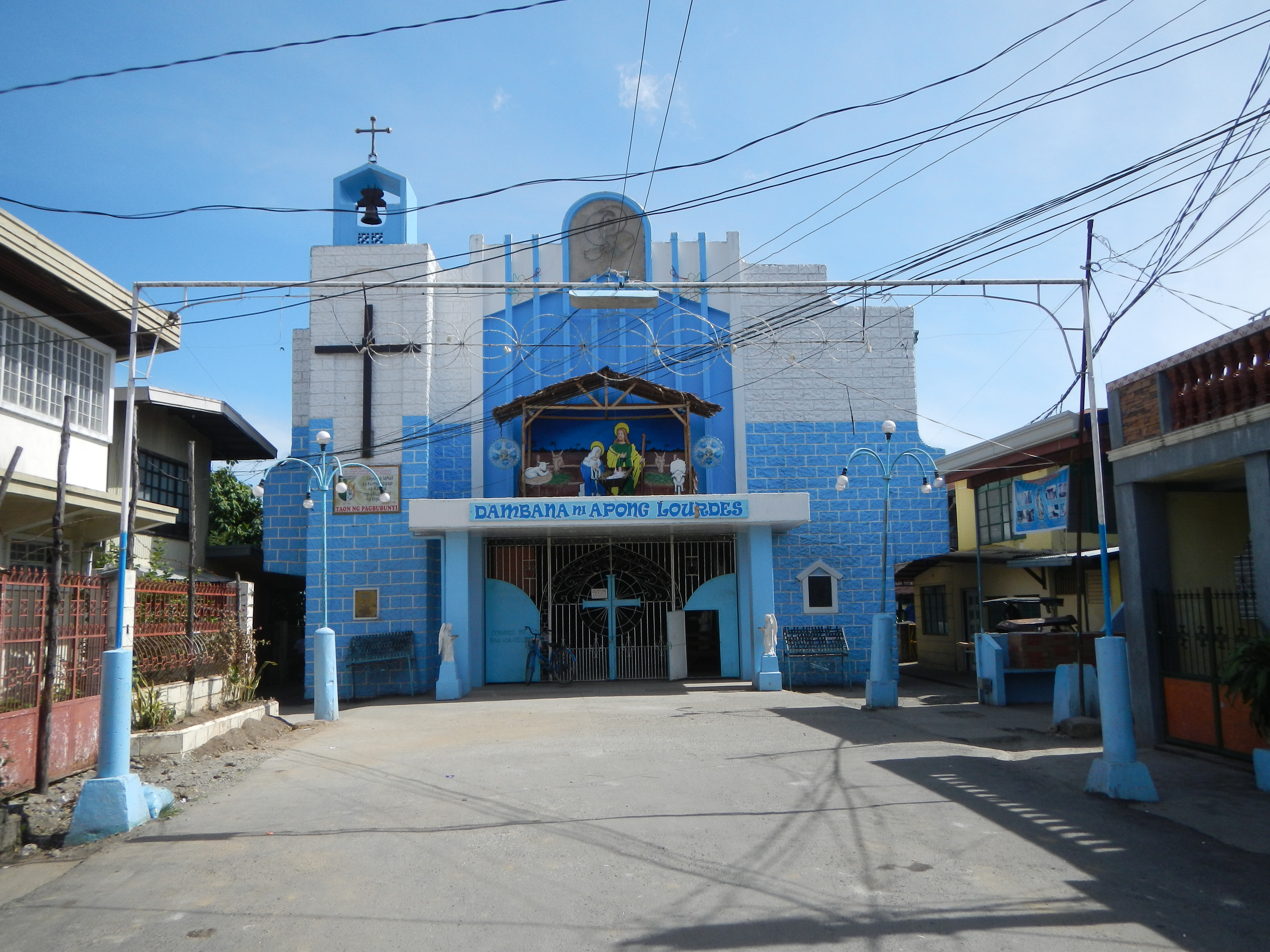
Shrine and chapel of Our Lady of Lourdes, Apong Lourdes Shrine in Maligaya, Cabiao (under the administration of St. John Nepomucene Parish, Cabiao)

== See also ==
- Catholic Church in the Philippines
- List of Catholic dioceses in the Philippines
- Roman Catholic Diocese of San Jose (Nueva Ecija)
