= Gapan Church =

Roman Catholic church in Nueva Ecija, Philippines

- Minor Basilica and National Shrine of La Virgen Divina Pastora
- Three Kings Parish
- Basilika Minore at Pambansang Dambana ng La Virgen Divina Pastora (Filipino); Basílica Menor y Santuario Nacional de la Virgen Divina Pastora (Spanish)
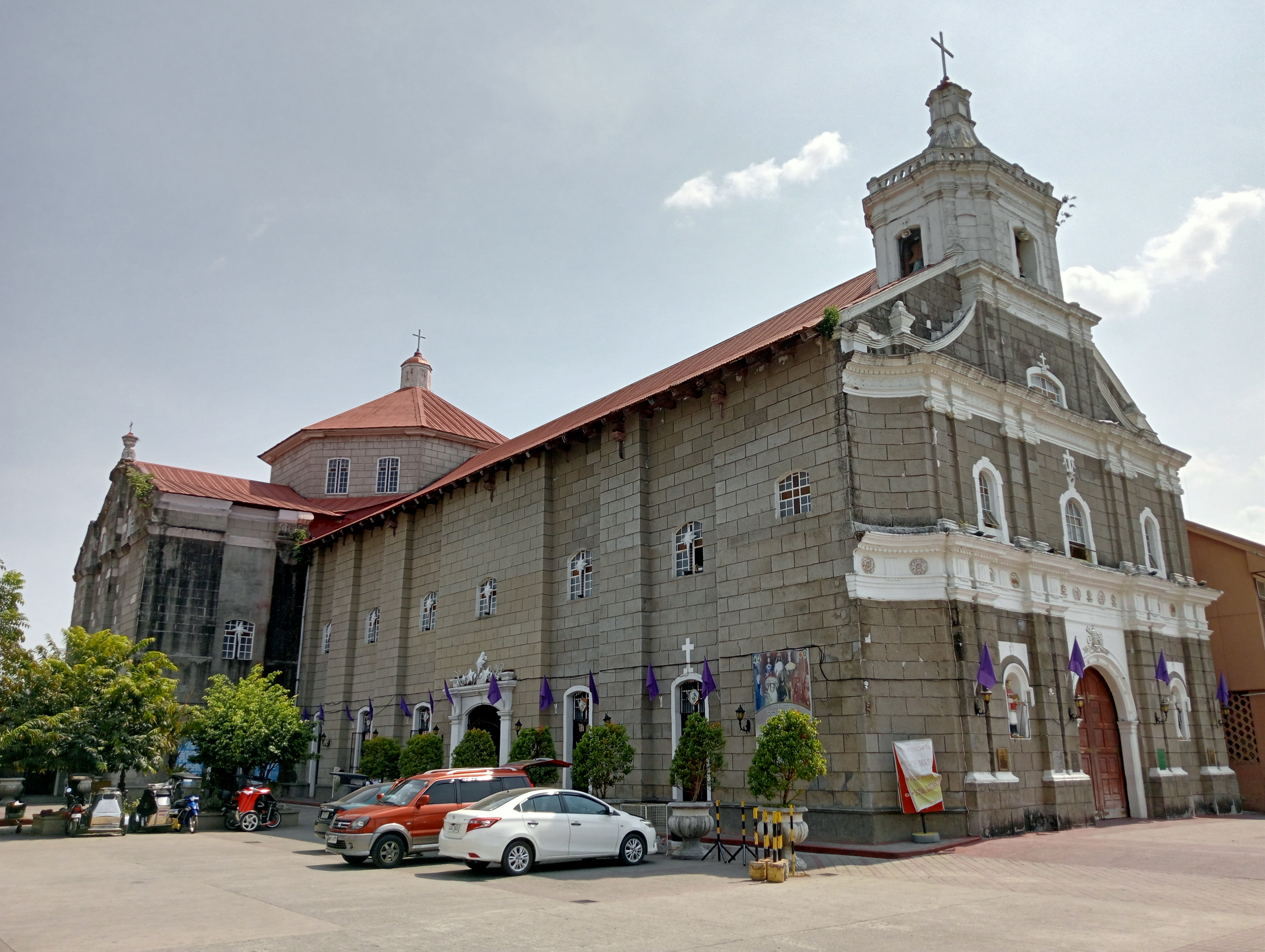
- The façade from the church patio in 2023

- Location in Nueva Ecija Location in Luzon Location in the Philippines
- 15°18′50″N 120°56′57″E
- Location: Delos Reyes Street, San Vicente, Gapan, Nueva Ecija
- Country: Philippines
- Denomination: Roman Catholic

History
- Status: Minor Basilica; National shrine
- Dedication: Three Kings

Architecture
- Functional status: Active
- Architectural type: Church building
- Style: Earthquake Baroque
- Groundbreaking: 1589
- Completed: 1678

Specifications
- Materials: Limestone, bricks

Administration
- Province: Lingayen-Dagupan
- Diocese: Cabanatuan
- Deanery: Divina Pastora
- Parish: Three Kings

Clergy
- Rector: Aldrin B. Domingo, Ph. L

The Minor Basilica and National Shrine of La Virgen Divina Pastora, known canonically as the Three Kings Parish and commonly known as Gapan Church, is a Roman Catholic minor basilica and national shrine in Gapan, Nueva Ecija in the Philippines that was founded in the 1500s. It is under the jurisdiction of the Diocese of Cabanatuan.

It is one of the oldest Roman Catholic churches in the country, and the oldest and the biggest colonial church in Nueva Ecija. The church has been a pilgrimage site for two patron saints of Gapan and also of Nueva Ecija; the Three Kings, and La Divina Pastora (Divine Shepherdess). In 1986, the Catholic Bishops Conference of the Philippines declared the church as a national shrine. In 2024, Pope Francis granted the title of Minor Basilica to the shrine.

== History ==
=== Foundation ===
The Augustinians formally accepted Gapan and established in it a community with its own minister on August 28, 1595. Situated across the Río Chico, Gapan was originally bounded by Manicling, San Miguel de Mayumo and the Cordillera mountains. Due to its rapid progress, the Provincial Council decreed on October 31, 1636, that Gapan be divided into two vicariates; the first will be composed of Gapan, Junas and San Miguel; and the second of the areas north of the river. In 1704, Governor General Domingo de Zabalburu ordered that all Chinese living in the missions of Bongabon, Santor, Carranglan and Pantabangan transfer to Gapan. These movement witnessed the steady increase of population. In 1612, Gapan merely had a population of 1,800 which soared to 3,651 in 1760 and in 1896, 15,238.

=== Construction ===
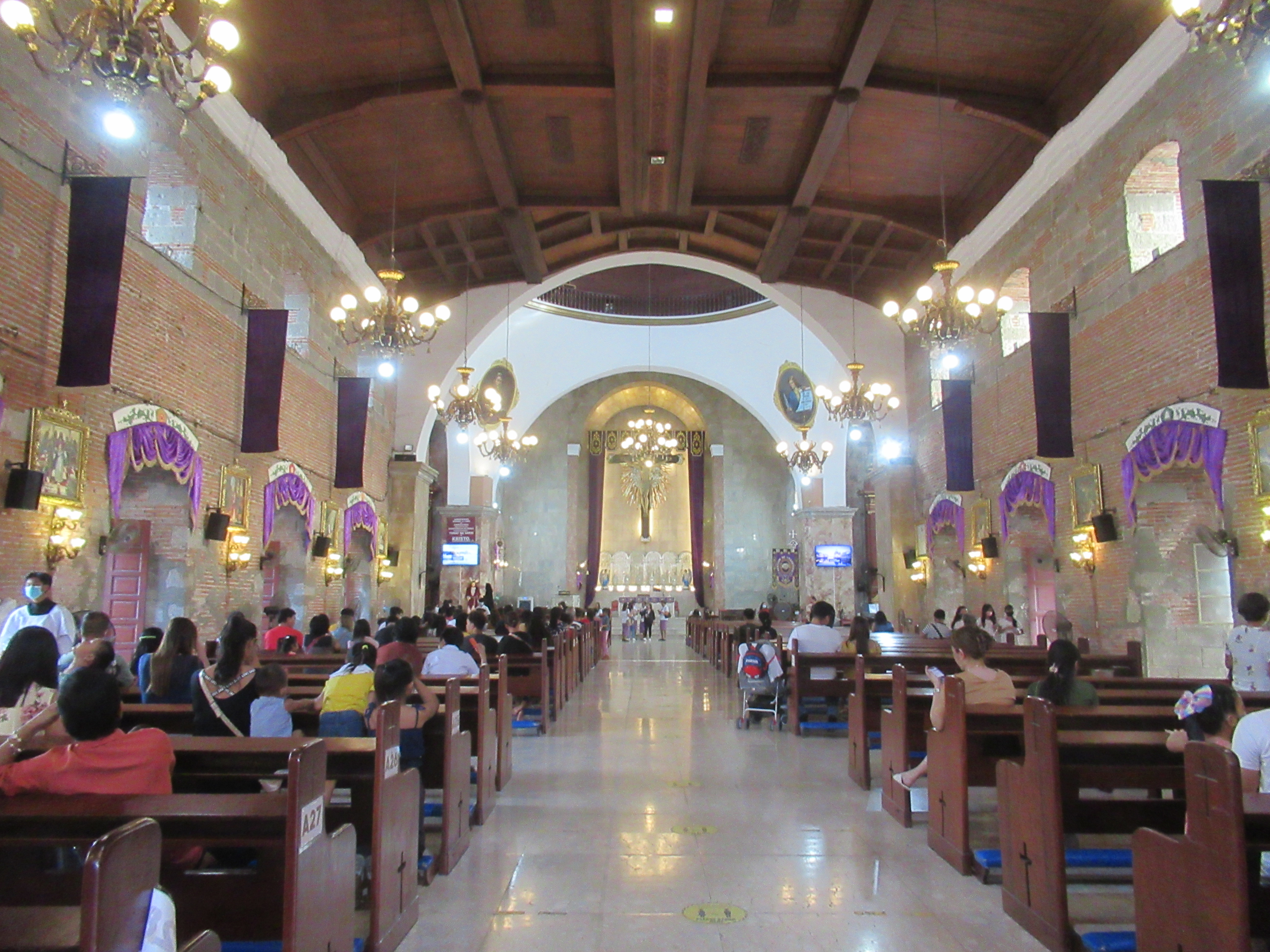
Church interior in 2023

The Order of Saint Augustine administered the parish of Gapan from its foundation in 1595. However, the secular priests took over in 1770. The present church was constructed under the direction of the friars Laredo, Cornejo and Laneza from 1856 to 1872. Fray Francisco Laredo started the construction of the church and finished the work on the walls, the dome, the presbytery and the transept. It was his successors Fray Antonio Cornejo and Fray Leonardo Laneza who worked for the completion of the church.

The church was built on the spot cleared by Augustinian friars Contreras, Tendilla, Caballo and Salazar in 1595. The church is distinctly Byzantine in style and is built from blocks of limestone and bricks. The bricks, locally known as laryo, were made in two sites. The first site is only a few blocks away from the church in San Vicente while the second site is in San Lorenzo, the two oldest settlements in Gapan.

The exterior of the church is plain while its interior formerly has a central retablo with niches dedicated to the Epiphany of the Lord and to the La Virgen Divina Pastora. This central retablo however was torn down in the 1970s due to infestation of termites. It was replaced with a modern style sanctuary dominated by a huge image of the Crucifixion, arguably the largest in the province of Nueva Ecija. Only the two side altars remain. Prominently displayed on the left retablo is the original miniature image of the Virgen Divina Pastora which was donated by the Valmonte Family in 1986. The right retablo enshrines the Adoration of the Magi.

While the palitada of the walls was stripped, the grand painting of the Holy Trinity in the church's dome has been preserved. Local artist Isidoro Samonte painted the image in the early 1900s.

=== Image of La Virgen Divina Pastora ===
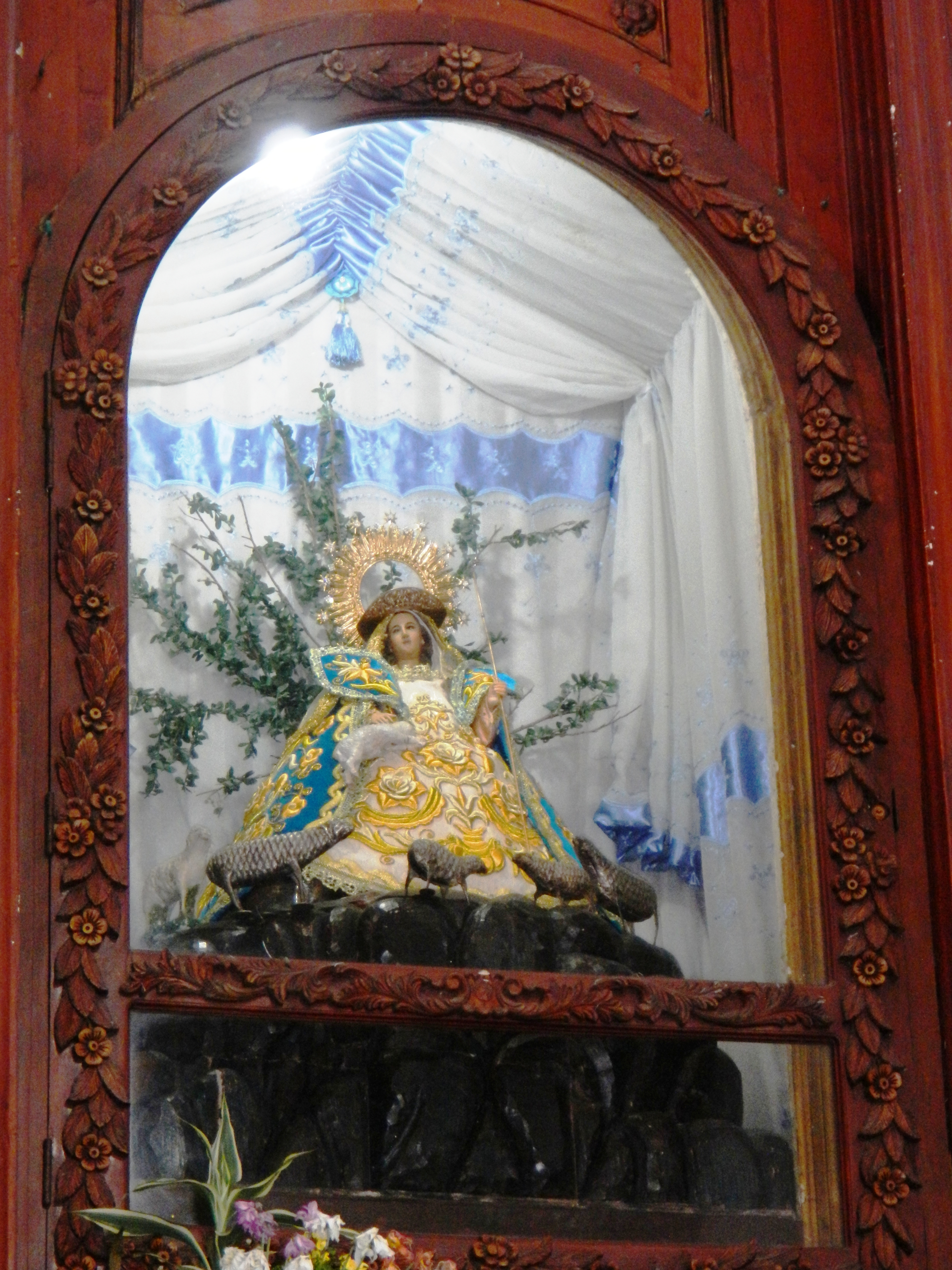
The original image of La Virgen Divina Pastora at the left retablo of the church

The image of the La Virgen Divina Pastora is the object of the largest Marian pilgrimages in Central Luzon. Although the precise origins of the image are shrouded in legend, its recorded history is traced largely to the Valmonte Family.

In the 1700s, Doña Juana Valmonte, daughter of Don Bartolomé de la Cruz Valmonte – Gapan's first gobernadorcillo in 1747 – and Doña Eulalia Fernández, had a strange dream in which the Virgin Mary wanted to be fetched from Spain. Distraught, she sought the advice of her father who told her to consult a friar friend in Manila. Doña Juana then traveled to Manila to recount her dream to the friar. Impressed by her story, the friar told of the devotion to La Divina Pastora which was gaining popularity in Spain. Doña Juana, on her part, ordered an image from Spain and to enthrone it in their family estate. The image eventually arrived in Manila via the Acapulco Galleon, and was brought to Gapan. It then became the center of devotion for the family, who started to celebrate her feast in thanksgiving for a bountiful harvest every May 1. Soon, stories of miracles spread throughout the province, and people came in throngs to celebrate the yearly fiesta.

In the 1800s, La Virgen Divina Pastora was made patroness of Gapan parish, secondary to the Three Kings. Care of the image after the death of Doña Juana was passed to her brother, Don Basílio Valmonte, then his son, General Pantaleón Valmonte, the hero of the First Cry of Nueva Ecija. General Valmonte was executed on charges of rebellion against Spain, and the image passed to his widow, Máxima Navarro-Valmonte for safekeeping. It was finally handed to Donata Valmonte-Cala, and her daughter Emma Valmote-Cala.

On December 19, 1963, Pope Paul VI approved the canonical coronation of the image of La Virgen Divina Pastora. Since the original image is privately owned, a church-owned replica was used for the coronation ceremony, which was presided by the first Bishop of the Diocese of Cabanatuan, Most Rev. Mariano Gaviola, on April 26, 1964. The original image of the La Virgen Divina Pastora was eventually donated to the Parish of the Three Kings upon the declaration of the church as a national shrine on April 26, 1986.

=== Minor basilica ===
On November 28, 2023, Pope Francis elevated the church as the twenty-second Minor Basilica in the Philippines, and the first in the province of Nueva Ecija. A Pontifical Mass was held on April 26 to solemnly declare the shrine as a basilica, presided by the Apostolic Nuncio to the Philippines, Archbishop Charles John Brown, and concelebrated by twenty bishops and a dozen Catholic priests. The mayor of Gapan, Joy Pascual, also attended, attended by 2,000 lay faithful. The solemn declaration coincided with the sixtieth anniversary of the image’s canonical coronation.

== Gallery ==
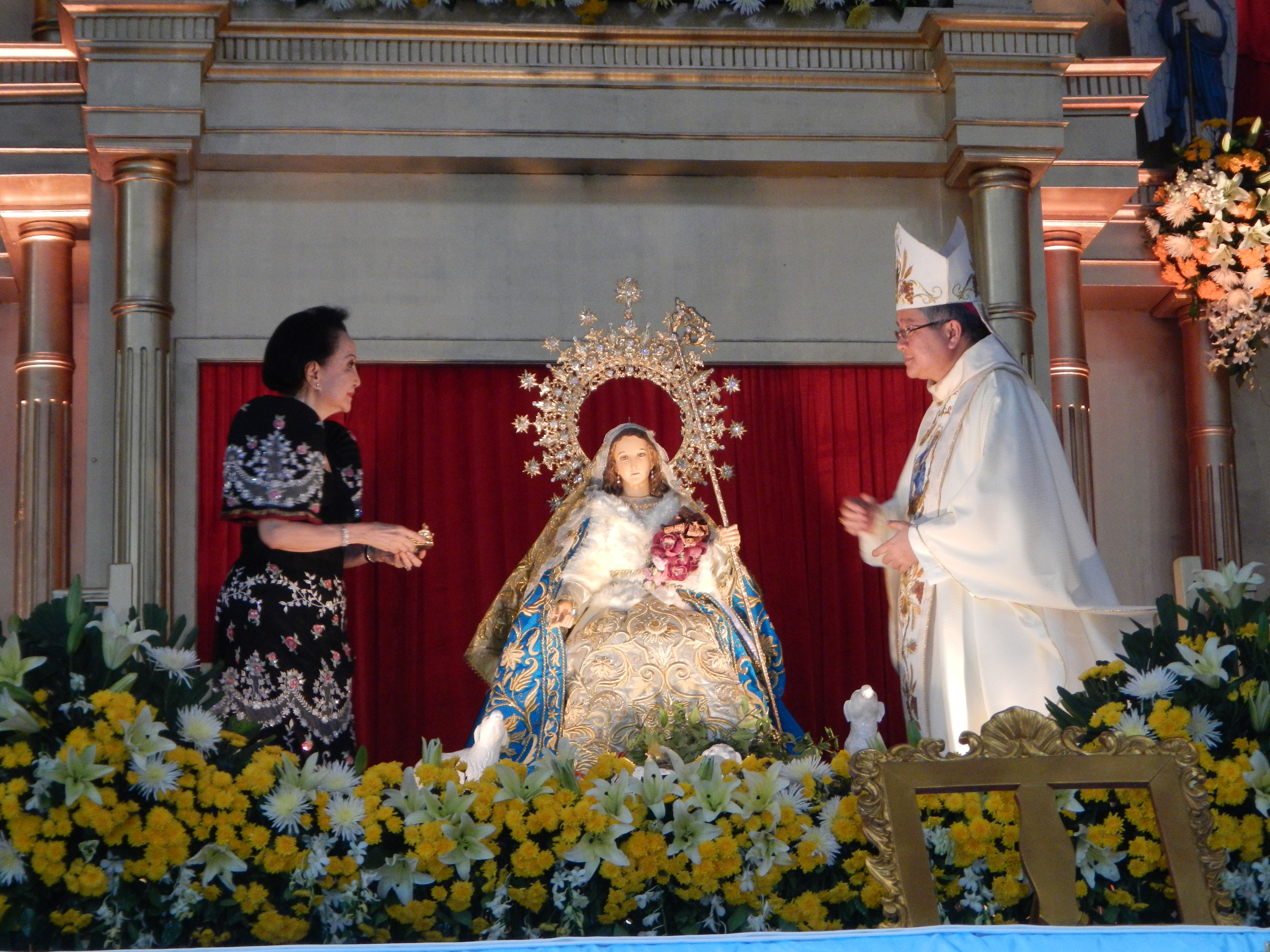
La Virgen Divina Pastora on its 50th Canonical Coronation Anniversary

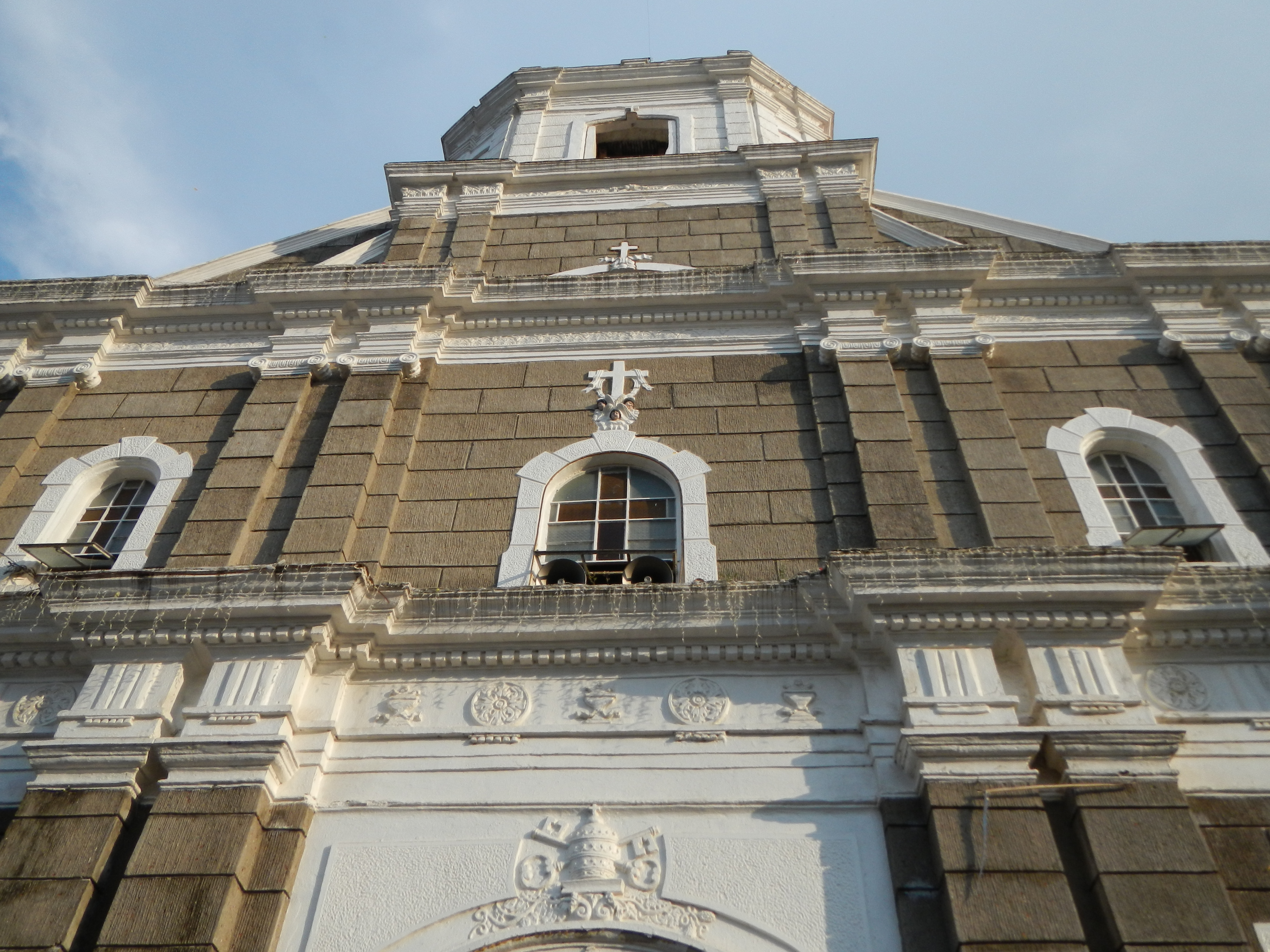
The church's façade showing its status as a basilica with the Papal Keys

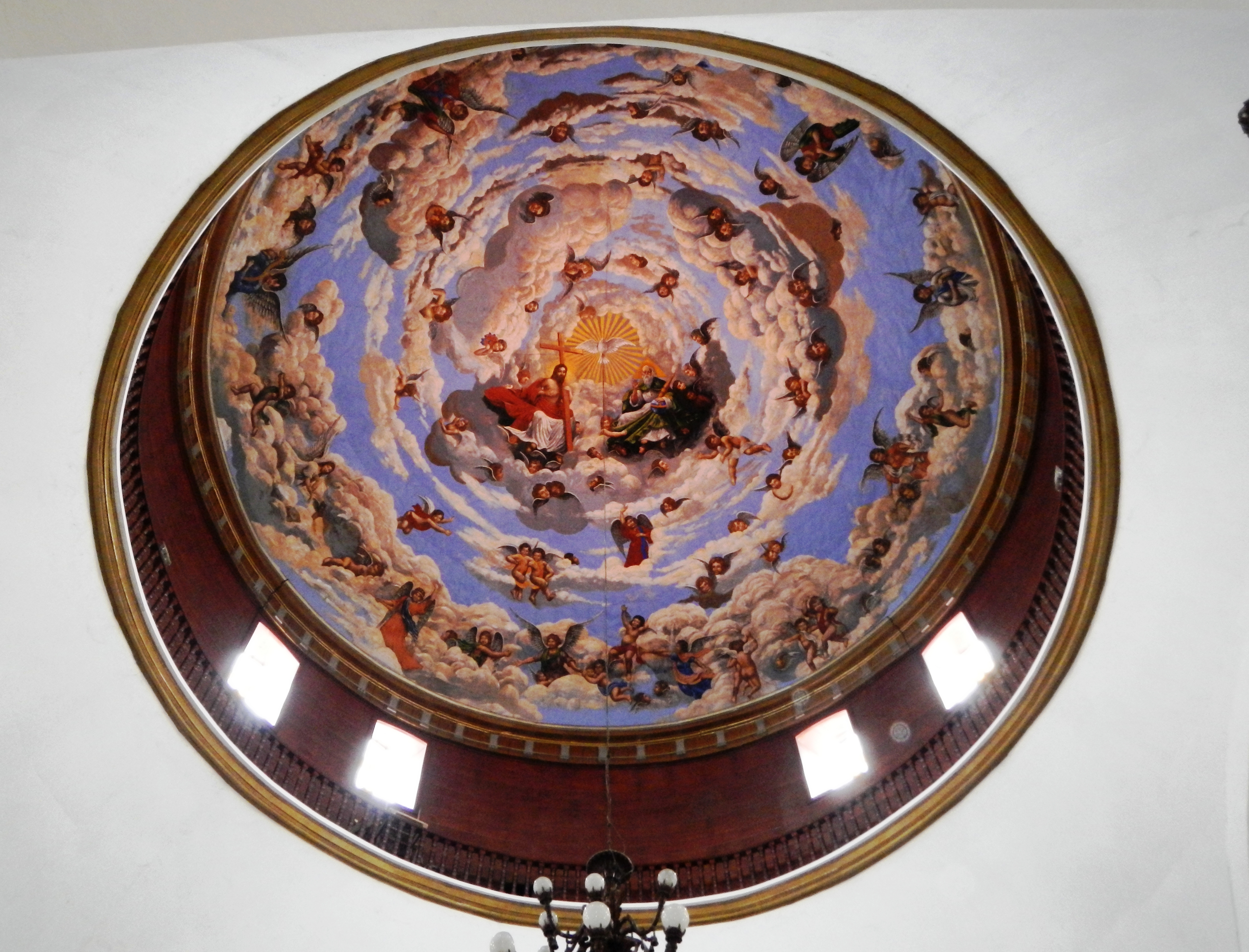
Image of the Holy Trinity in glory, painted on the interior of the basilica dome

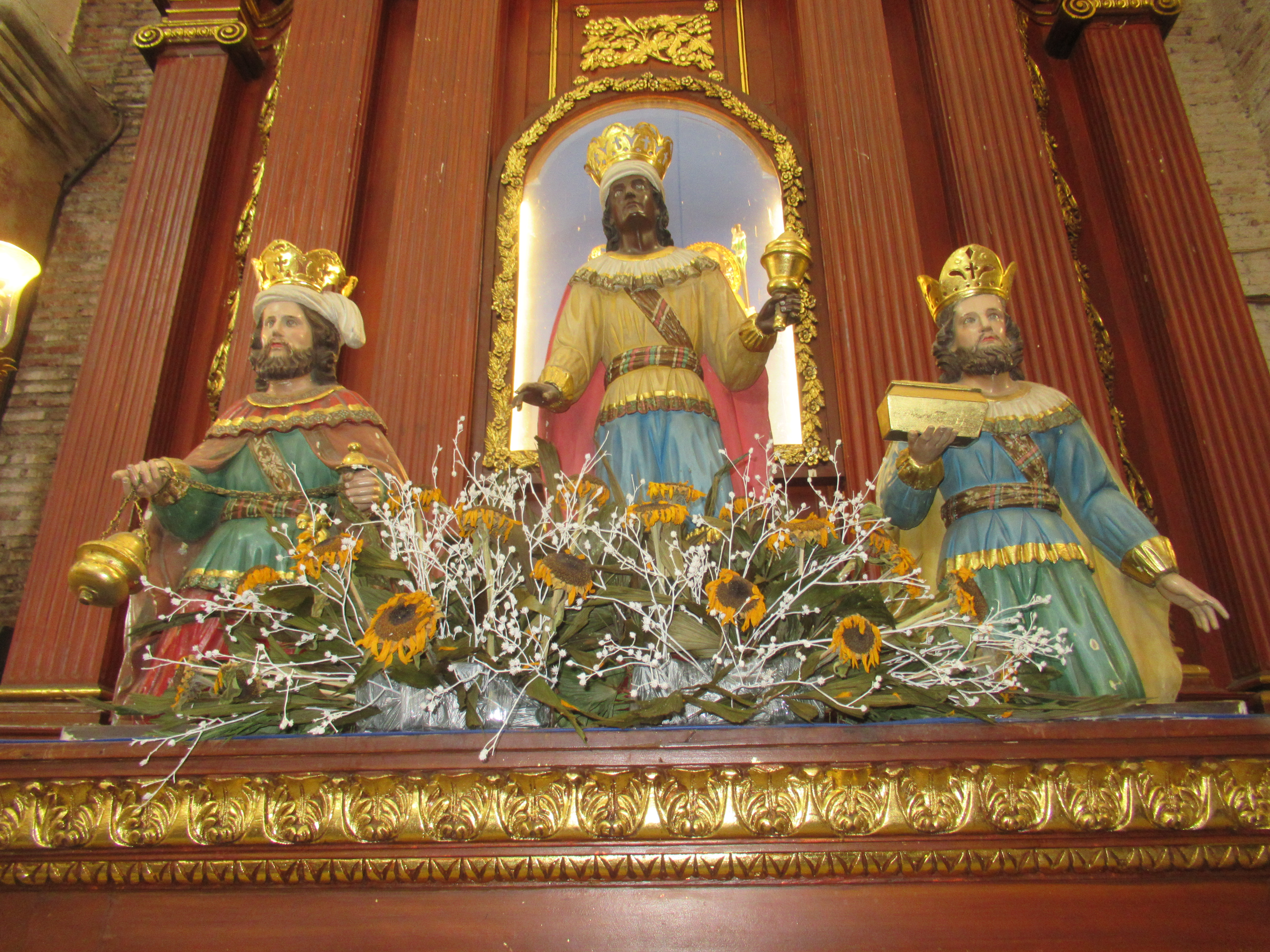
Statues of the Three Kings

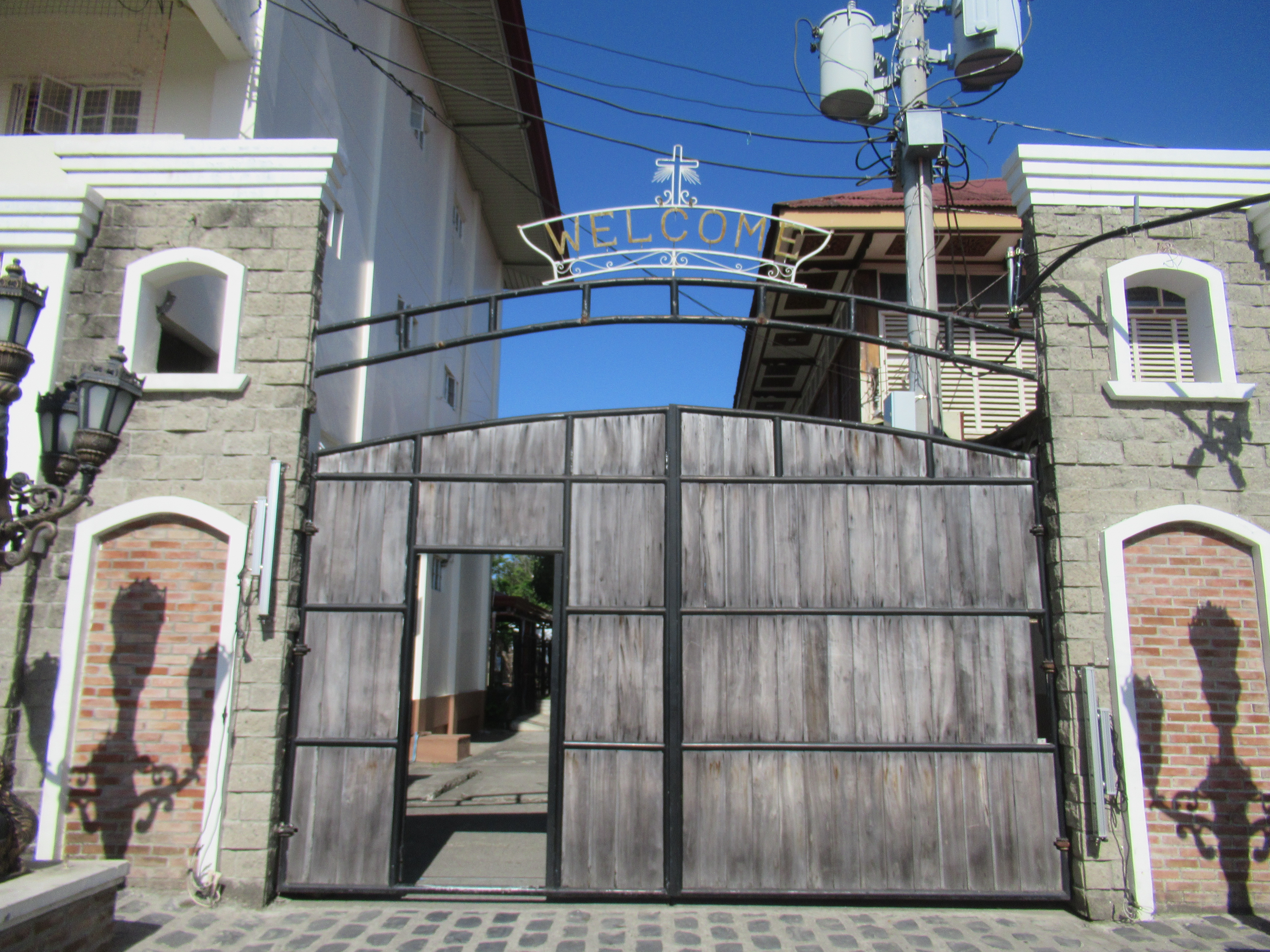
The back gate of the church

== See also ==
- Crowned Marian images in the Philippines
- List of Catholic basilicas
