= Cabanatuan Cathedral =

Roman Catholic church in Nueva Ecija, Philippines

- Saint Nicholas of Tolentine Parish Cathedral
- Parokyang Katedral ni San Nikolas ng Tolentino (Filipino); Parroquia Catedral de San Nicolás de Tolentino (Spanish); Katedral ng Cabanatuan (Filipino)
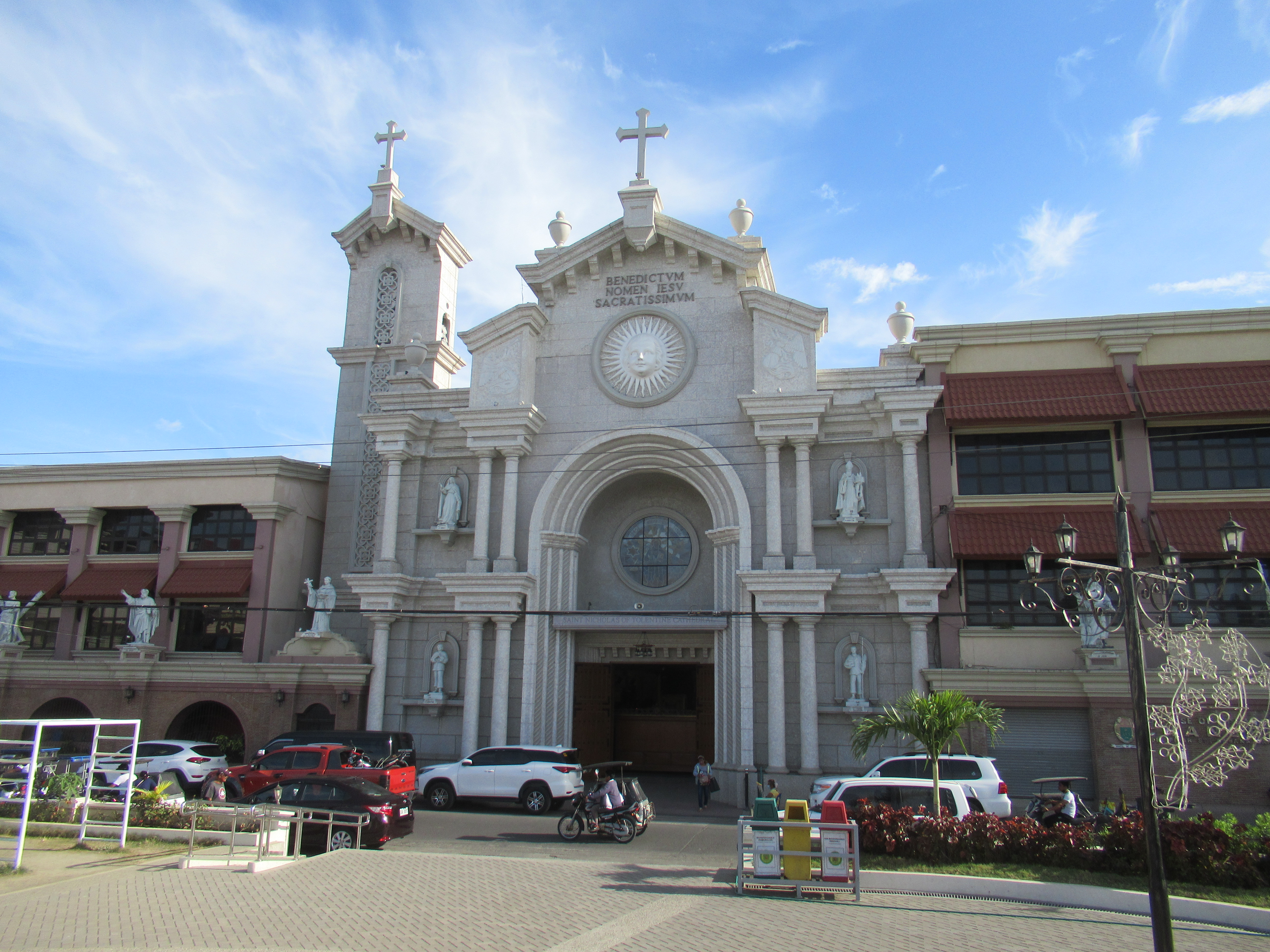
- The newly renovated cathedral facade in 2023

- Location in Nueva Ecija Location in Luzon Location in the Philippines
- 15°29′21″N 120°57′51″E
- Location: Cabanatuan, Nueva Ecija
- Country: Philippines
- Denomination: Roman Catholic
- Website: www.facebook.com/CabanatuanCathedral; youtube.com/@CABANATUANCATHEDRAL

History
- Status: Cathedral
- Founded: 1700
- Dedication: Saint Nicholas of Tolentino

Architecture
- Functional status: Active
- Architectural type: Church building
- Style: Neoclassical (2019)
- Completed: 1866, 1891, 1975
- Demolished: 1880, 1934, 1972

Administration
- Archdiocese: Lingayen-Dagupan
- Diocese: Cabanatuan

Clergy
- Bishop(s): Prudencio Padilla Andaya, Jr. CICM, DD
- Rector: Reynold H. Oliveros, J. C. D
- Vicars: Rommel P. Marcelo; Alfonso S. Saulo
- Priest: Reynold H. Oliveros, J.C.D

Saint Nicholas of Tolentine Parish Cathedral, commonly known as Cabanatuan Cathedral, is the ecclesiastical seat of the Roman Catholic Diocese of Cabanatuan in the Philippines. It is located at Del Pilar Street, Barangay General Luna, in Cabanatuan, Nueva Ecija province.

The cathedral and the Plaza Lucero at its front, is nationally and historically known as the site where Filipino general Antonio Luna was killed.

== History ==
After the parishes of Gapan in 1595 and Santor in 1636, the Augustinian priests founded the Cabanatuan church in 1700 as a visita of Gapan. By 1732, it only had 700 parishioners. The parish administration was transferred to secular priests in 1866, and in the same year, the first stone church and convent buildings were constructed under the leadership of José de la Fuente. The said buildings were destroyed by the earthquake of July 18, 1880 and were reconstructed under the helm of Mariano Rivas in 1891.

During the Philippine–American War, the cathedral's convent, shortly served as the seat of the capital of the Philippines where Antonio Luna and his aide-de-camp, Francisco Román, were killed by the members of the Kawit Battalion on June 5, 1899. In 1934, the church was razed by fire wherein only its lateral walls were spared. Nine years after the canonical foundation of the Diocese of Cabanatuan, the cathedral, and its adjacent former College of the Immaculate Conception building, was charred again on September 28, 1972. Three years later, on November 22, 1975, the church reconstruction was finished under Pacífico Araullo. It was dedicated by then Cabanatuan Bishop Vicente Reyes and then Apostolic Nuncio to the Philippines, Bruno Torpigliani.

A new cathedral, locally called crypta, is being built in Sumacab Este, Cabanatuan, since 1999 and can accommodate 3,000 people.

== Gallery ==
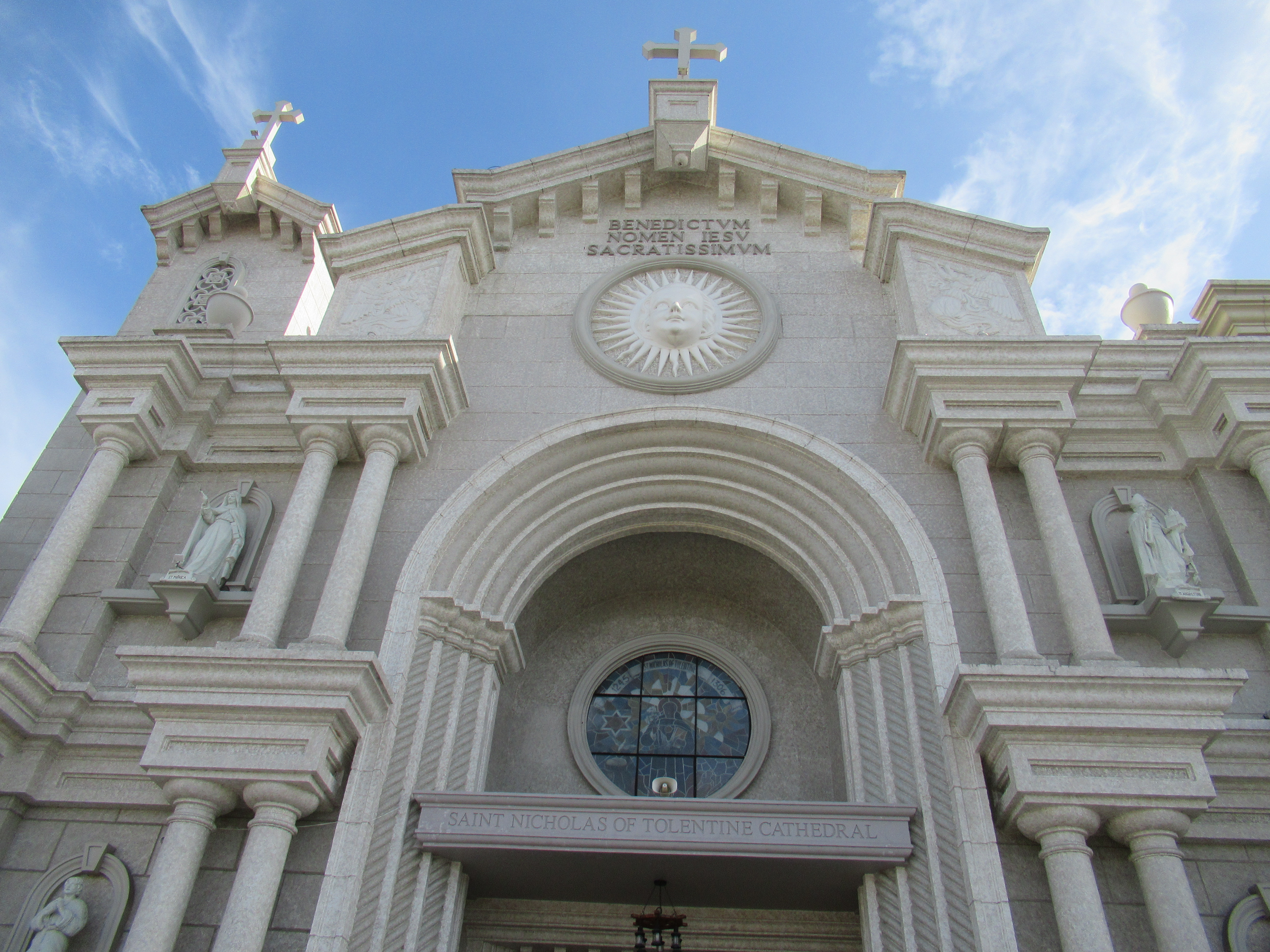
Close-up of the cathedral's facade

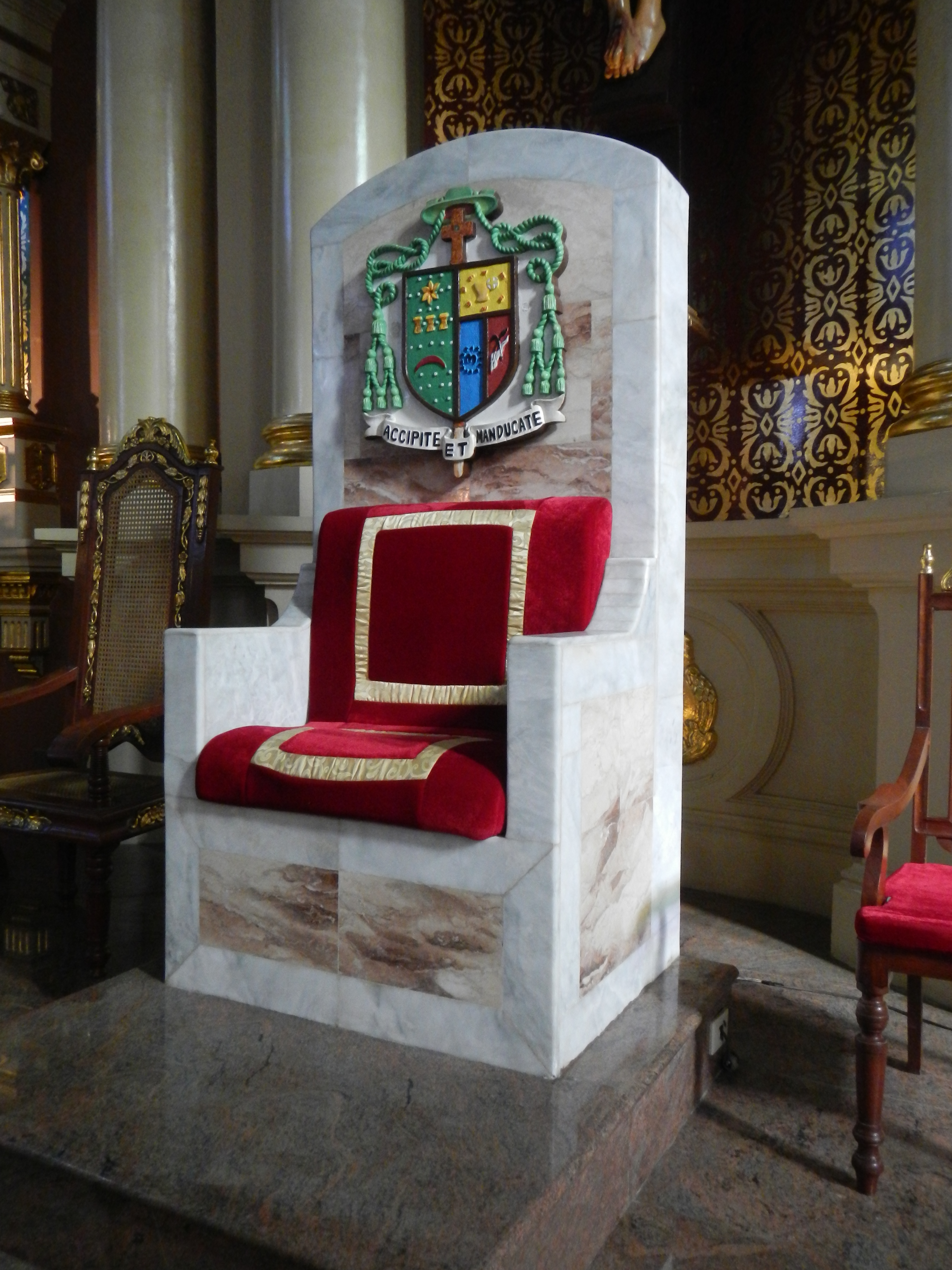
The bishop's cathedra

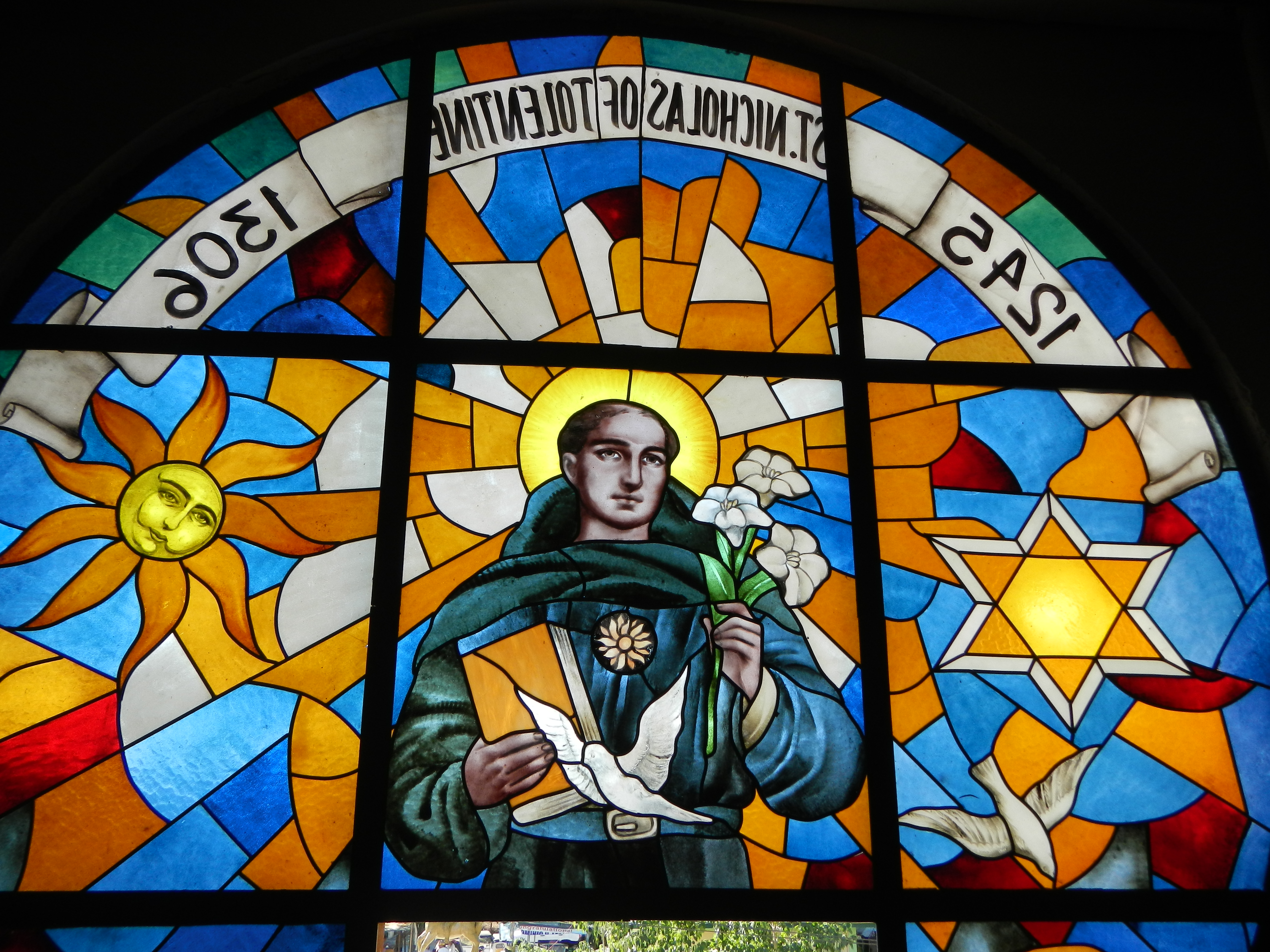
Stained glass at the cathedral facade featuring Nicholas of Tolentino

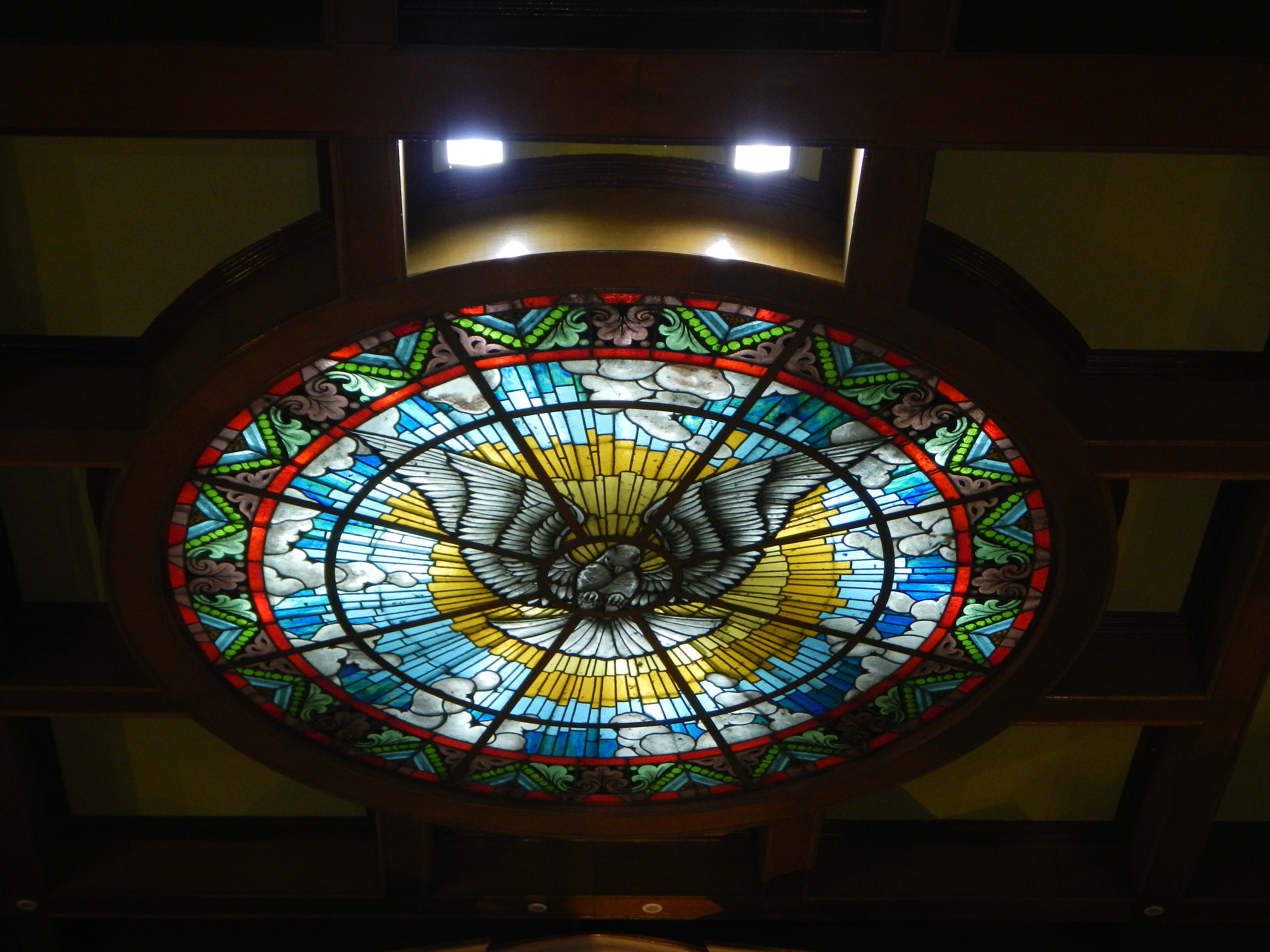
Stained glass depicting the Holy Spirit on the ceiling above the altar

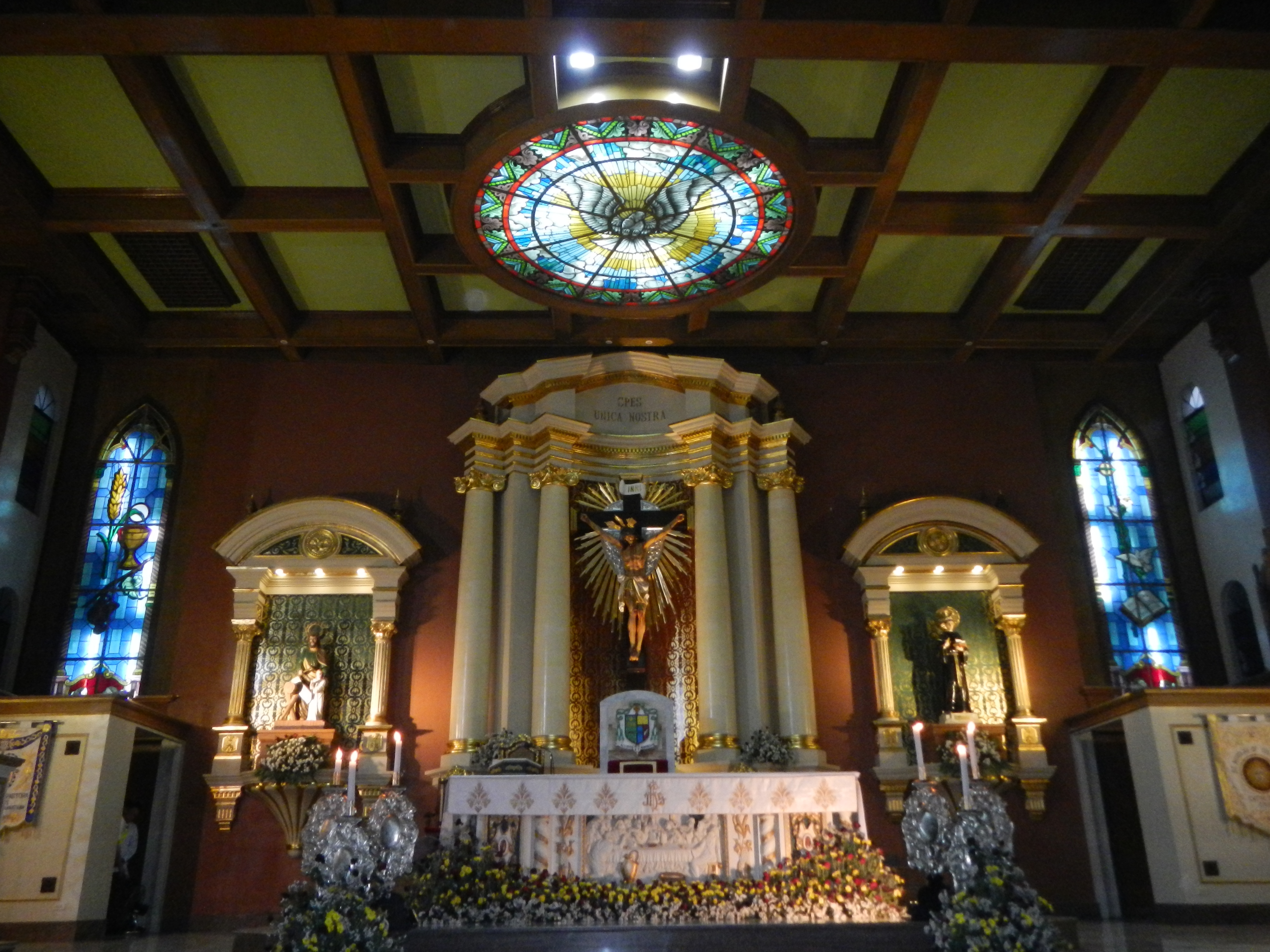
Cathedral sanctuary in 2015

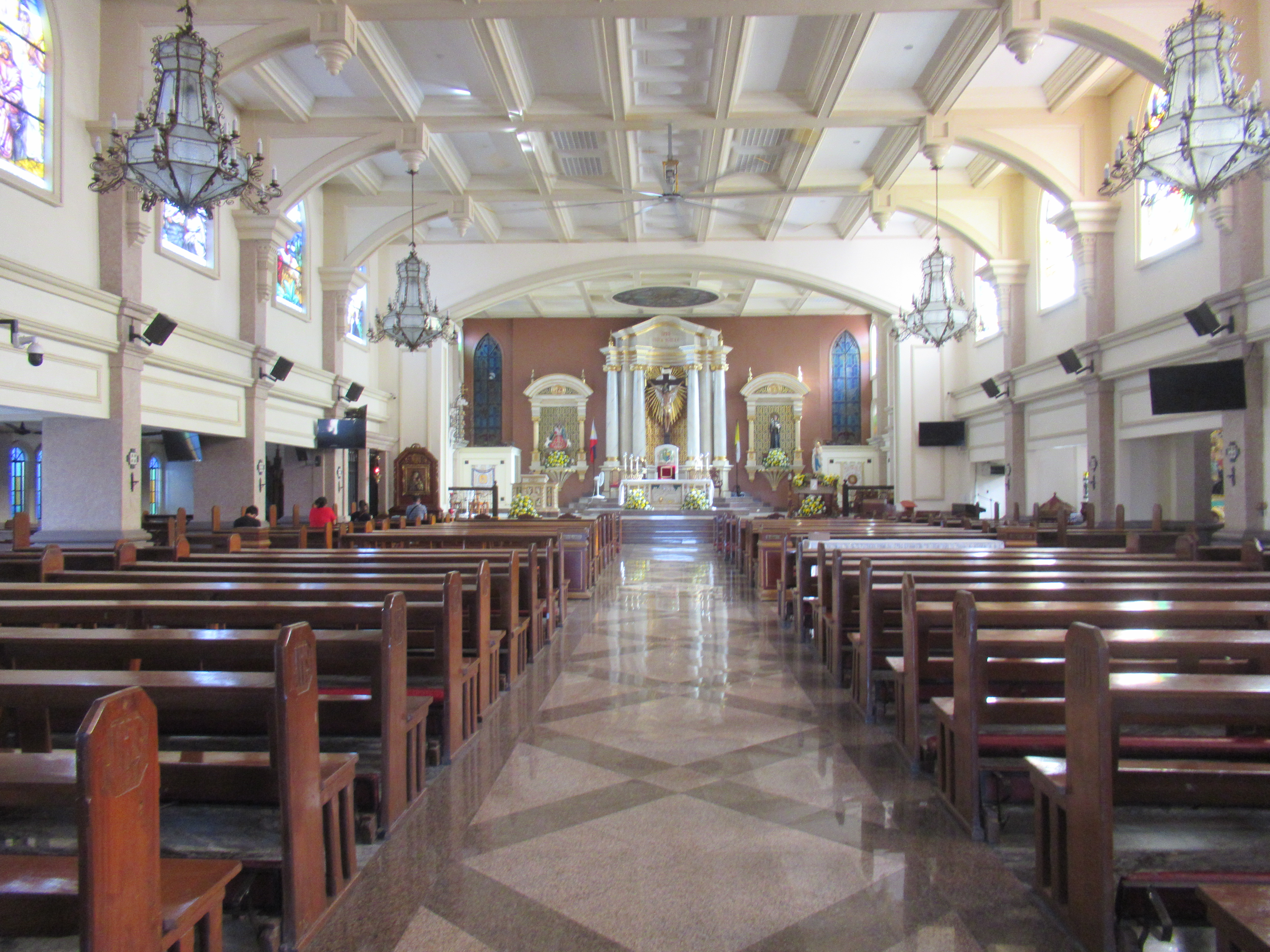
Cathedral nave in 2023

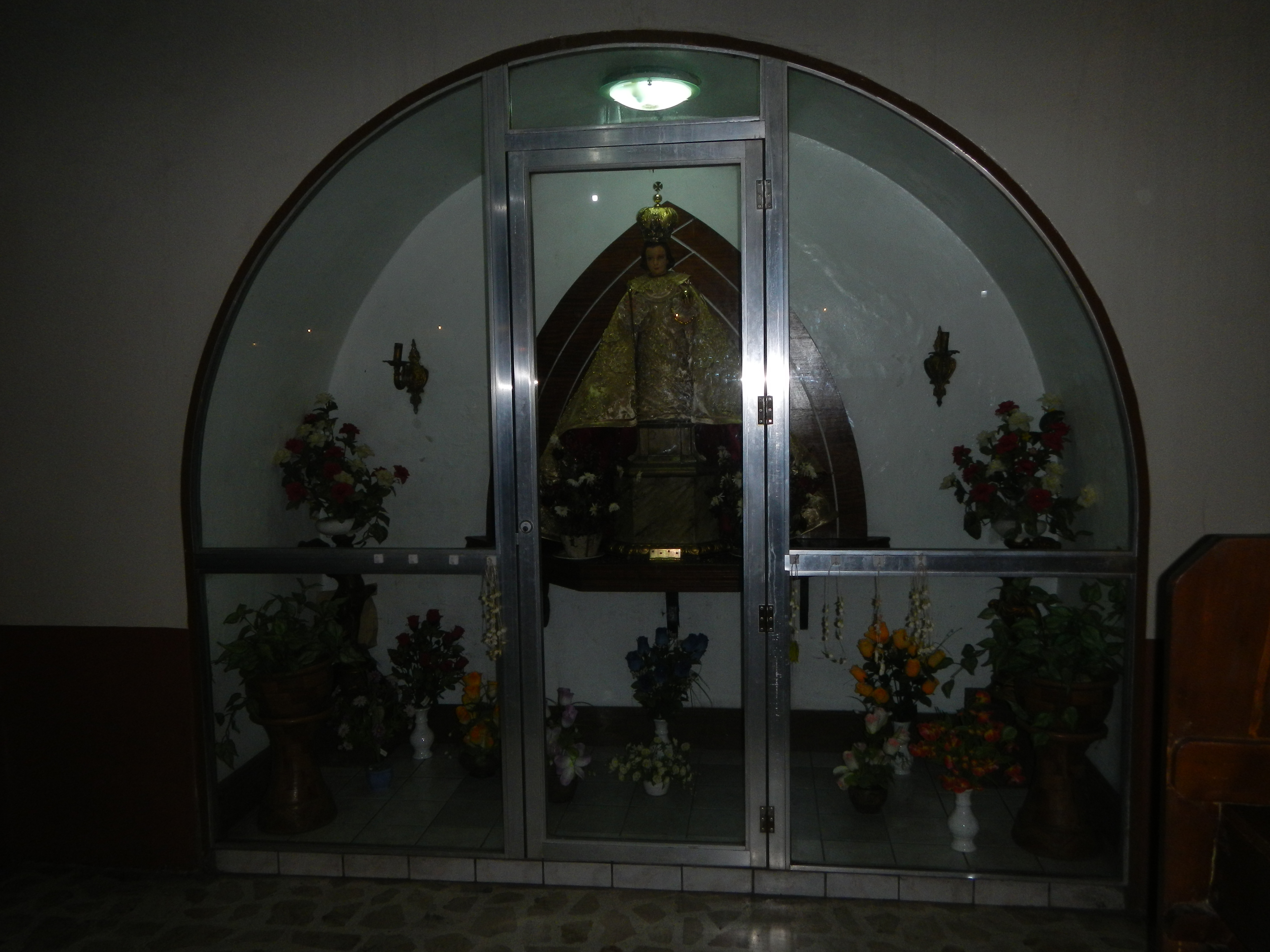
Image of the Santo Niño of Cabanatuan

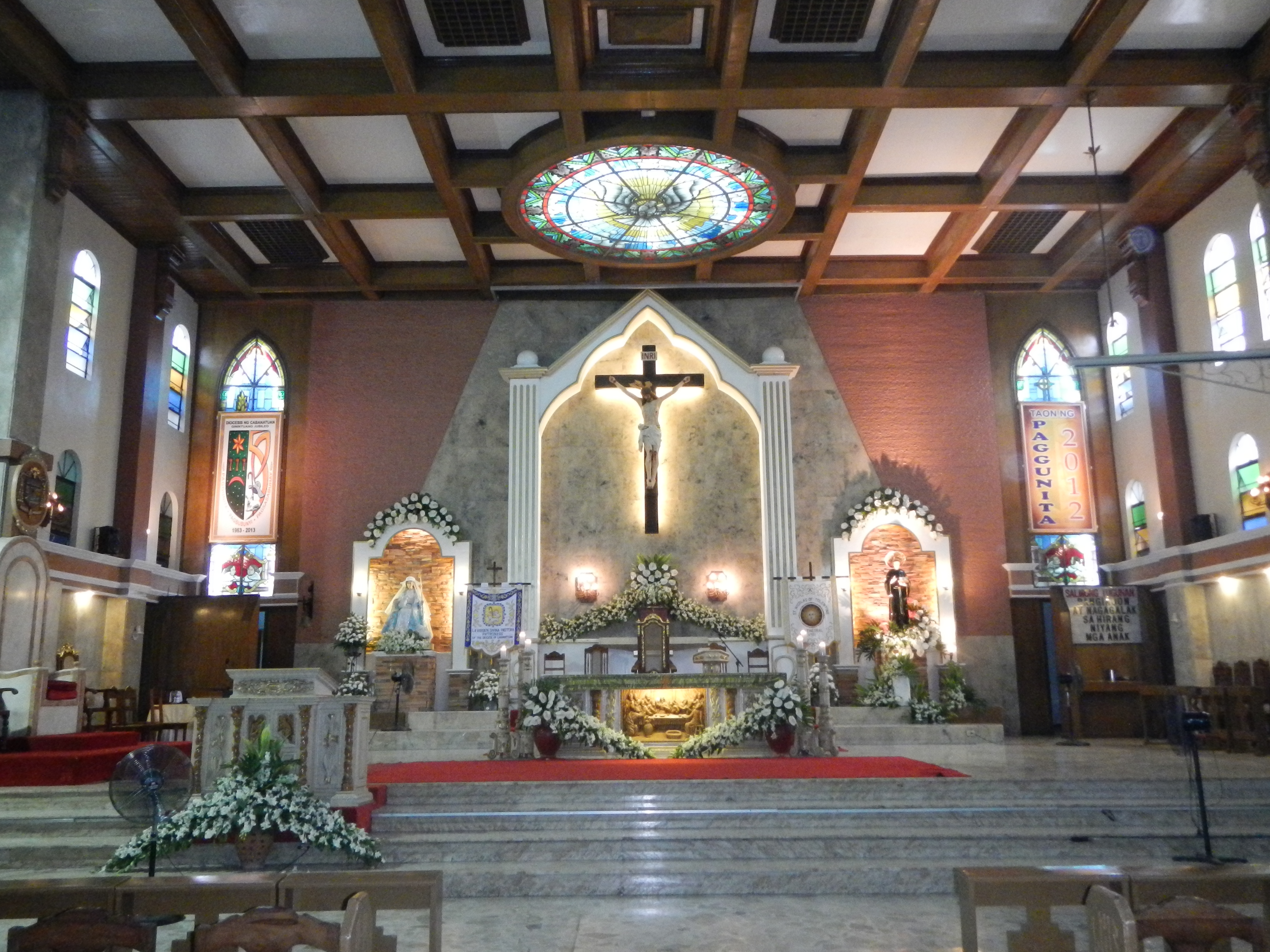
Cathedral sanctuary in 2012

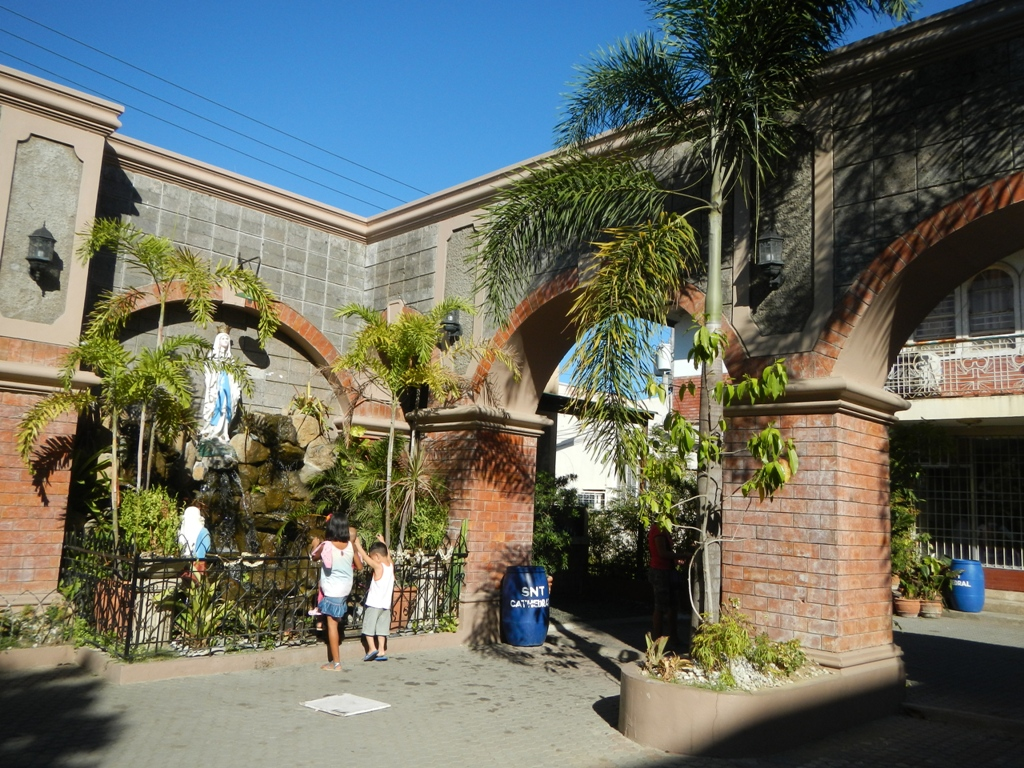
Cathedral patio

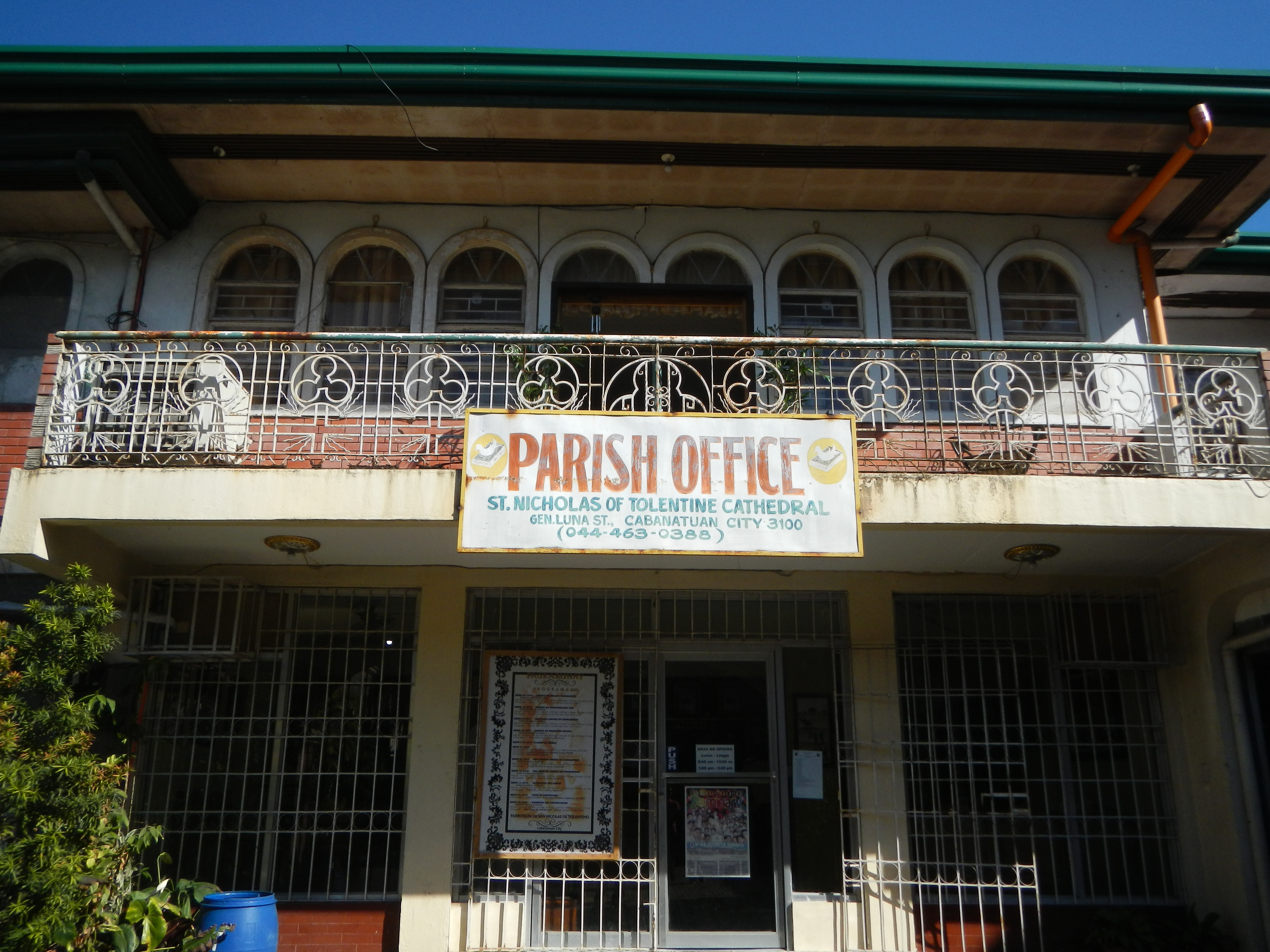
Parish office
